= List of Coelogyne species =

The following is an alphabetical list of Coelogyne species accepted by the Plants of the World Online as at October 2025.

== A ==
- Coelogyne abbreviata (Blume) M.W.Chase & Schuit.
- Coelogyne aborta (Ames) M.W.Chase & Schuit.
- Coelogyne acuifera (Carr) M.W.Chase & Schuit.
- Coelogyne aculeata M.W.Chase & Schuit.
- Coelogyne acuminata (J.J.Sm.) M.W.Chase & Schuit.
- Coelogyne acutilabium de Vogel
- Coelogyne adpressibulba (J.J.Sm.) M.W.Chase & Schuit.
- Coelogyne advena C.S.P.Parish & Rchb.f.
- Coelogyne affinis (Ames) M.W.Chase & Schuit.
- Coelogyne aidiolepis (Seidenf. & de Vogel) R.Rice
- Coelogyne alata (Ames) M.W.Chase & Schuit.
- Coelogyne alaticallosa (de Vogel) M.W.Chase & Schuit.
- Coelogyne alba (Lindl.) Rchb.f.
- Coelogyne albiflora (Ridl.) M.W.Chase & Schuit.
- Coelogyne alboaurantia Elis.George & J.-C.George
- Coelogyne albobrunnea J.J.Sm.
- Coelogyne albolutea Rolfe
- Coelogyne albomarginata Yudistira, Schuit. & J.Champ.
- Coelogyne alboviridis (J.J.Sm.) M.W.Chase & Schuit.
- Coelogyne alpina (Carr) M.W.Chase & Schuit.
- Coelogyne alvinlokii P.O'Byrne & J.J.Verm.
- Coelogyne ambangensis (H.A.Pedersen) M.W.Chase & Schuit.
- Coelogyne amesiana (H.A.Pedersen) M.W.Chase & Schuit.
- Coelogyne amplissima Ames & C.Schweinf.
- Coelogyne anceps Hook.f.
- Coelogyne anfracta (Ames) M.W.Chase & Schuit.
- Coelogyne angustichila M.W.Chase & Schuit.
- Coelogyne angustiloba (Carr) M.W.Chase & Schuit.
- Coelogyne angustipetala X.J.Xiao, O.Gruss & L.J.Chen
- Coelogyne annamensis Rolfe
- Coelogyne anomala (Carr) M.W.Chase & Schuit.
- Coelogyne apiculata (Lindl.) Rchb.f.
- Coelogyne apinnata M.W.Chase & Schuit.
- Coelogyne apoensis (T.Hashim.) M.W.Chase & Schuit.
- Coelogyne appendiculata (J.J.Sm.) M.W.Chase & Schuit.
- Coelogyne arachnites (Rchb.f.) M.W.Chase & Schuit.
- Coelogyne articulata (Lindl.) Rchb.f.
- Coelogyne aspera (L.O.Williams) M.W.Chase & Schuit.
- Coelogyne asperata Lindl.
- Coelogyne atjehensis (J.J.Sm.) M.W.Chase & Schuit.
- Coelogyne augustii M.W.Chase & Schuit.
- Coelogyne aurantiaca (Blume) M.W.Chase & Schuit.
- Coelogyne auricularis (Ames) M.W.Chase & Schuit.
- Coelogyne auriculiloba (J.J.Wood) M.W.Chase & Schuit.

== B ==
- Coelogyne bandaharaensis (J.J.Wood & J.B.Comber) M.W.Chase & Schuit.
- Coelogyne banksii (Cootes) M.W.Chase & Schuit.
- Coelogyne barbata Lindl. ex Griff.
- Coelogyne barbifrons (Kraenzl.) M.W.Chase & Schuit.
- Coelogyne basalis (J.J.Sm.) M.W.Chase & Schuit.
- Coelogyne beccarii Rchb.f.
- Coelogyne benguetensis M.W.Chase & Schuit.
- Coelogyne benkii Cavestro
- Coelogyne bicamerata J.J.Sm.
- Coelogyne bigibbosa (J.J.Sm.) M.W.Chase & Schuit.
- Coelogyne bilamellata Lindl.
- Coelogyne binuangensis (Ames) M.W.Chase & Schuit.
- Coelogyne blumea M.W.Chase & Schuit.
- Coelogyne bontocensis M.W.Chase & Schuit.
- Coelogyne borneensis Rolfe
- Coelogyne brachygyne J.J.Sm.
- Coelogyne brachyota (Rchb.f.) M.W.Chase & Schuit.
- Coelogyne brachyptera Rchb.f.
- Coelogyne bracteosa (Rchb.f.) M.W.Chase & Schuit.
- Coelogyne brevilabris (Ridl.) M.W.Chase & Schuit.
- Coelogyne brevilamellata J.J.Sm.
- Coelogyne breviscapa Lindl.
- Coelogyne breviunguiculata (Shih C.Hsu, Gravend. & de Vogel) M.W.Chase & Schuit.
- Coelogyne bruneiensis de Vogel
- Coelogyne brunnea Lindl.
- Coelogyne buennemeyeri J.J.Sm.
- Coelogyne bulleyia R.Rice

== C ==
- Coelogyne calcarata J.J.Sm.
- Coelogyne calcicola Kerr
- Coelogyne caloglossa Schltr.
- Coelogyne camelostalix (Rchb.f.) Rchb.f.
- Coelogyne candoonensis Ames
- Coelogyne cantonensis (Rolfe) R.Rice
- Coelogyne carinata Rolfe
- Coelogyne carnea (Blume) Rchb.f.
- Coelogyne carnosa (Ridl.) M.W.Chase & Schuit.
- Coelogyne carnosulilabra (J.J.Sm.) M.W.Chase & Schuit.
- Coelogyne carrii M.W.Chase & Schuit.
- Coelogyne cavaleriei (Schltr.) M.W.Chase & Schuit.
- Coelogyne chanii Gravend. & de Vogel
- Coelogyne charisae (Cabactulan, Cootes, M.Leon & R.B.Pimentel) M.W.Chase & Schuit.
- Coelogyne chen-tsii R.Rice
- Coelogyne chinensis (Lindl.) Rchb.f.
- Coelogyne chlorophaea Schltr.
- Coelogyne chloroptera Rchb.f.
- Coelogyne chrysotropis Schltr.
- Coelogyne cinnabarina (Pfitzer) M.W.Chase & Schuit.
- Coelogyne citrina (H.A.Pedersen) M.W.Chase & Schuit.
- Coelogyne clandestina M.W.Chase & Schuit.
- Coelogyne clemensii Ames & C.Schweinf.
- Coelogyne clowesiae (Cootes & G.Tiong) M.W.Chase & Schuit.
- Coelogyne cobbiana (Rchb.f.) M.W.Chase & Schuit.
- Coelogyne coccinea (H.A.Pedersen & Gravend.) M.W.Chase & Schuit.
- Coelogyne complanata M.W.Chase & Schuit.
- Coelogyne complectens (J.J.Sm.) M.W.Chase & Schuit.
- Coelogyne compressicaulis Ames & C.Schweinf.
- Coelogyne concinna Ridl.
- Coelogyne confertiflora M.W.Chase & Schuit.
- Coelogyne confusa Ames
- Coelogyne contractipetala J.J.Sm.
- Coelogyne convallariae C.S.P.Parish & Rchb.f.
- Coelogyne convallariiformis (Schauer) M.W.Chase & Schuit.
- Coelogyne cootesii (H.A.Pedersen) M.W.Chase & Schuit.
- Coelogyne copelandii (Ames) M.W.Chase & Schuit.
- Coelogyne cordata (H.A.Pedersen) M.W.Chase & Schuit.
- Coelogyne coriacea M.W.Chase & Schuit.
- Coelogyne cornuta (Blume) M.W.Chase & Schuit.
- Coelogyne corrugis M.W.Chase & Schuit.
- Coelogyne corymbosa Lindl.
- Coelogyne crassa (Ridl.) M.W.Chase & Schuit.
- Coelogyne crassilabia (J.J.Wood) M.W.Chase & Schuit.
- Coelogyne crassiloba J.J.Sm.
- Coelogyne craticulilabris Carr
- Coelogyne cristata Lindl.
- Coelogyne crocea (H.A.Pedersen) M.W.Chase & Schuit.
- Coelogyne cruciformis (J.J.Wood) (J.J.Wood)
- Coelogyne cumingii Lindl.
- Coelogyne cuprea H.Wendl. & Kraenzl.
- Coelogyne cupulata (J.J.Wood) M.W.Chase & Schuit.
- Coelogyne curranii (Ames) M.W.Chase & Schuit.
- Coelogyne cuspilabia M.W.Chase & Schuit.
- Coelogyne cyclopetala (Kraenzl.) M.W.Chase & Schuit.
- Coelogyne cycnoches C.S.P.Parish & Rchb.f.
- Coelogyne cymbidioides Rchb.f.
- Coelogyne cymbiformis (Ames) M.W.Chase & Schuit.

== D ==
- Coelogyne datensis M.W.Chase & Schuit.
- Coelogyne demissa (D.Don) M.W.Chase & Schuit.
- Coelogyne dempoensis (J.J.Sm.) M.W.Chase & Schuit.
- Coelogyne dentata M.W.Chase & Schuit.
- Coelogyne dentifera (J.J.Sm.) M.W.Chase & Schuit.
- Coelogyne dentiloba (J.J.Sm.) M.W.Chase & Schuit.
- Coelogyne derekcabactulanii (M.Leon, Cootes & R.B.Pimentel) M.W.Chase & Schuit.
- Coelogyne devogelii (J.J.Wood) M.W.Chase & Schuit.
- Coelogyne devoogdii (J.J.Sm.) M.W.Chase & Schuit.
- Coelogyne dewildeorum (J.J.Wood & J.B.Comber) M.W.Chase & Schuit.
- Coelogyne dewindtiana (W.W.Sm.) M.W.Chase & Schuit.
- Coelogyne diabloviridis (Cootes & R.Boos) M.W.Chase & Schuit.
- Coelogyne distans J.J.Sm.
- Coelogyne distelidia (I.D.Lund) M.W.Chase & Schuit.
- Coelogyne dolichobrachia (Schltr.) M.W.Chase & Schuit.
- Coelogyne dolichopoda Aver. & K.S.Nguyen
- Coelogyne dulitensis Carr
- Coelogyne duplicibrachia (J.J.Sm.) M.W.Chase & Schuit.

== E ==
- Coelogyne eberhardtii Gagnep.
- Coelogyne ecallosa (Ames) M.W.Chase & Schuit.
- Coelogyne ecarinata C.Schweinf.
- Coelogyne echinolabium de Vogel
- Coelogyne ecucullata (Naive, R.Boos, M.Leon & Cootes) M.W.Chase & Schuit.
- Coelogyne edanoi (Quisumb.) M.W.Chase & Schuit.
- Coelogyne edentula (Blume) M.W.Chase & Schuit.
- Coelogyne edii R.Rice
- Coelogyne eduardii M.W.Chase & Schuit.
- Coelogyne elegans (Schltr.) M.W.Chase & Schuit.
- Coelogyne elmeri Ames
- Coelogyne emmae M.W.Chase & Schuit.
- Coelogyne endertii J.J.Sm.
- Coelogyne entomophobia M.W.Chase & Schuit.
- Coelogyne erectilabia (H.A.Pedersen) M.W.Chase & Schuit.
- Coelogyne ewae (R.Boos, Cootes & W.Suarez) M.W.Chase & Schuit.
- Coelogyne exalata Ridl.
- Coelogyne exaltata (de Vogel) M.W.Chase & Schuit.
- Coelogyne exasperata (Ames) M.W.Chase & Schuit.
- Coelogyne exigua (Ames) M.W.Chase & Schuit.
- Coelogyne exilis (Ames) M.W.Chase & Schuit.
- Coelogyne eximia (Ames) M.W.Chase & Schuit.
- Coelogyne eymae (H.A.Pedersen) M.W.Chase & Schuit.

== F ==
- Coelogyne filiformis (Lindl.) M.W.Chase & Schuit.
- Coelogyne filipeda Gagnep.
- Coelogyne fimbriata Lindl.
- Coelogyne fimbriloba (J.J.Sm.) M.W.Chase & Schuit.
- Coelogyne flaccida Lindl.
- Coelogyne flexuosa Rolfe
- Coelogyne floresensis Elis.George & J.-C.George
- Coelogyne flos-susannae (J.J.Wood) M.W.Chase & Schuit.
- Coelogyne fluctuata M.W.Chase & Schuit.
- Coelogyne foerstermannii Rchb.f.
- Coelogyne fonstenebrarum P.O'Byrne
- Coelogyne formosa Schltr.
- Coelogyne foxworthyi (Ames) M.W.Chase & Schuit.
- Coelogyne fragrans Schltr.
- Coelogyne fruticicola (J.J.Sm.) M.W.Chase & Schuit.
- Coelogyne fuerstenbergiana Schltr.
- Coelogyne fuliginosa Paxton
- Coelogyne fusca (Lindl.) Rchb.f.
- Coelogyne fuscescens Lindl.

== G ==
- Coelogyne galbana (J.J.Wood) M.W.Chase & Schuit.
- Coelogyne galeata (H.A.Pedersen) M.W.Chase & Schuit.
- Coelogyne gardneriana Lindl.
- Coelogyne garrettii (I.D.Lund) M.W.Chase & Schuit.
- Coelogyne geesinkii (J.J.Wood) M.W.Chase & Schuit.
- Coelogyne geigeri (Cootes, Cabactulan, R.B.Pimentel & M.Leon) M.W.Chase & Schuit.
- Coelogyne genuflexa Ames & C.Schweinf.
- Coelogyne ghatakii T.K.Paul, S.K.Basu & M.C.Biswas
- Coelogyne gibbifera J.J.Sm.
- Coelogyne gibbosa (Blume) Rchb.f.
- Coelogyne gibbsiae (Rolfe) M.W.Chase & Schuit.
- Coelogyne globigera (Ridl.) M.W.Chase & Schuit.
- Coelogyne globosa (Blume) Rchb.f.
- Coelogyne glossorhyncha (Schltr.) M.W.Chase & Schuit.
- Coelogyne glumacea (Lindl.) M.W.Chase & Schuit.
- Coelogyne gongshanensis H.Li ex S.C.Chen
- Coelogyne gracilipes (Carr) M.W.Chase & Schuit.
- Coelogyne gracilis (Hook.f.) M.W.Chase & Schuit.
- Coelogyne graciliscapa (Ames) M.W.Chase & Schuit.
- Coelogyne graminea (Ridl.) M.W.Chase & Schuit.
- Coelogyne graminoides (Carr) M.W.Chase & Schuit.
- Coelogyne gravenhorstii (J.J.Sm.) M.W.Chase & Schuit.
- Coelogyne griffithii Hook.f.
- Coelogyne guamensis Ames
- Coelogyne guibertiae (Finet) R.Rice

== H ==
- Coelogyne hajrae Phukan
- Coelogyne hamata (Schltr.) M.W.Chase & Schuit.
- Coelogyne hampelii (Sulistyo, Gravend., R.Boos & Cootes) M.W.Chase & Schuit.
- Coelogyne harana J.J.Sm.
- Coelogyne haslamii (Ames) M.W.Chase & Schuit.
- Coelogyne hastata (Ames) M.W.Chase & Schuit.
- Coelogyne hastiloba (J.J.Wood) M.W.Chase & Schuit.
- Coelogyne havilandii (Pfitzer) M.W.Chase & Schuit.
- Coelogyne heptaphylla (Kraenzl.) M.W.Chase & Schuit.
- Coelogyne hirtella J.J.Sm.
- Coelogyne histrix M.W.Chase & Schuit.
- Coelogyne hitendrae S.Das & S.K.Jain
- Coelogyne holochila P.F.Hunt & Summerh.
- Coelogyne hologyne (Carr) M.W.Chase & Schuit.
- Coelogyne hosei (J.J.Wood) M.W.Chase & Schuit.
- Coelogyne huettneriana Rchb.f.
- Coelogyne hutchinsoniana (Ames) M.W.Chase & Schuit.

== I ==
- Coelogyne ignisiflora (M.N.Tamayo & R.Bustam.) M.W.Chase & Schuit.
- Coelogyne imbricans J.J.Sm.
- Coelogyne imbricata (Hook.) Rchb.f.
- Coelogyne imitator (J.J.Wood) M.W.Chase & Schuit.
- Coelogyne incrassata (Blume) Lindl.
- Coelogyne incurvibrachia (J.J.Sm.) M.W.Chase & Schuit.
- Coelogyne infernalis M.W.Chase & Schuit.
- Coelogyne ingloria J.J.Sm.
- Coelogyne insectifera (Ridl.) M.W.Chase & Schuit.
- Coelogyne integerrima Ames
- Coelogyne integra Schltr.
- Coelogyne involucrata M.W.Chase & Schuit.
- Coelogyne irawatiana M.W.Chase & Schuit.
- Coelogyne irigensis (Ames) M.W.Chase & Schuit.

== J ==
- Coelogyne javieriana (Magrath, Bulmer & I.Shafer) M.W.Chase & Schuit.
- Coelogyne jeffwoodii M.W.Chase & Schuit.
- Coelogyne jiewhoei (J.J.Wood) M.W.Chase & Schuit.
- Coelogyne joclemensii (Ames) M.W.Chase & Schuit.
- Coelogyne johannis-winkleri (J.J.Sm.) M.W.Chase & Schuit.

== K ==
- Coelogyne kabensis (J.J.Sm.) M.W.Chase & Schuit.
- Coelogyne kaliana P.J.Cribb
- Coelogyne kamborangensis (Ames) M.W.Chase & Schuit.
- Coelogyne karoensis (J.J.Wood) M.W.Chase & Schuit.
- Coelogyne katakiana (Phukan) R.Rice
- Coelogyne keithiana (W.W.Sm.) M.W.Chase & Schuit.
- Coelogyne kelabitensis (J.J.Wood) M.W.Chase & Schuit.
- Coelogyne kelamensis J.J.Sm.
- Coelogyne kemiriensis J.J.Sm.
- Coelogyne kennedyi (M.Leon, Cootes, Cabactulan & R.B.Pimentel) M.W.Chase & Schuit.
- Coelogyne kinabaluensis Ames & C.Schweinf.
- Coelogyne kopfii (Lückel) M.W.Chase & Schuit.
- Coelogyne korintjiensis (J.J.Sm.) M.W.Chase & Schuit.
- Coelogyne korthalsii M.W.Chase & Schuit.
- Coelogyne kouytcheensis (Gagnep.) M.W.Chase & Schuit.

== L ==
- Coelogyne laciniloba (J.J.Wood & A.Lamb) M.W.Chase & Schuit.
- Coelogyne lacinulosa J.J.Sm.
- Coelogyne lacteola M.W.Chase & Schuit.
- Coelogyne laetitia-reginae (de Vogel) M.W.Chase & Schuit.
- Coelogyne lagarophylla M.W.Chase & Schuit.
- Coelogyne lamellulifera (Carr) Masam.
- Coelogyne lancilabia (Seidenf.) R.Rice
- Coelogyne latens M.W.Chase & Schuit.
- Coelogyne latibrachiata (J.J.Sm.) M.W.Chase & Schuit.
- Coelogyne latifolia (Lindl.) M.W.Chase & Schuit.
- Coelogyne latiloba de Vogel
- Coelogyne latistelidia M.W.Chase & Schuit.
- Coelogyne lawrenceana Rolfe
- Coelogyne lecongkietii Vuong, Aver. & Q.T.Truong
- Coelogyne lentiginosa Lindl.
- Coelogyne lepantoensis M.W.Chase & Schuit.
- Coelogyne lepida (Ridl.) M.W.Chase & Schuit.
- Coelogyne leucantha W.W.Sm.
- Coelogyne leungiana S.Y.Hu
- Coelogyne leuserensis (J.J.Wood & J.B.Comber) M.W.Chase & Schuit.
- Coelogyne leveilleana (Schltr.) R.Rice
- Coelogyne lewisii (J.J.Wood) M.W.Chase & Schuit.
- Coelogyne linearifolia (Hook.f.) M.W.Chase & Schuit.
- Coelogyne loheri Rolfe
- Coelogyne longibulba (Holttum) R.Rice
- Coelogyne longibulbosa Ames & C.Schweinf.
- Coelogyne longicaulis (J.J.Sm.) M.W.Chase & Schuit.
- Coelogyne longifolia (Blume) Lindl.
- Coelogyne longilabellata M.W.Chase & Schuit.
- Coelogyne longilabra (de Vogel) R.Rice
- Coelogyne longipedicellata (H.A.Pedersen) M.W.Chase & Schuit.
- Coelogyne longipes Lindl.
- Coelogyne longirachis Ames
- Coelogyne longpasiaensis J.J.Wood & C.L.Chan
- Coelogyne louisiana (H.A.Pedersen) M.W.Chase & Schuit.
- Coelogyne lucbanensis (Ames) M.W.Chase & Schuit.
- Coelogyne lumakuensis (J.J.Wood) M.W.Chase & Schuit.
- Coelogyne lurida (Pfitzer) Ames & C.Schweinf.
- Coelogyne luzonensis (Ames) M.W.Chase & Schuit.
- Coelogyne lycastoides F.Muell. & Kraenzl.

== M ==
- Coelogyne macdonaldii F.Muell. & Kraenzl.
- Coelogyne macgregorii (Ames) M.W.Chase & Schuit.
- Coelogyne macroptera (Kraenzl.) M.W.Chase & Schuit.
- Coelogyne magaensis (J.J.Wood) M.W.Chase & Schuit.
- Coelogyne magna (Rchb.f.) M.W.Chase & Schuit.
- Coelogyne magnifica Y.H.Tan, S.S.Zhou & B.Yang
- Coelogyne magniflora M.W.Chase & Schuit.
- Coelogyne maleolens (Kraenzl.) M.W.Chase & Schuit.
- Coelogyne malindangensis (Ames) M.W.Chase & Schuit.
- Coelogyne malintangensis J.J.Sm.
- Coelogyne malipoensis Z.H.Tsi
- Coelogyne mandarinorum Kraenzl.
- Coelogyne mantis (J.J.Sm.) M.W.Chase & Schuit.
- Coelogyne marginata (Ames) M.W.Chase & Schuit.
- Coelogyne marknaivei (Cootes) M.W.Chase & Schuit.
- Coelogyne marmorata Rchb.f.
- Coelogyne marthae S.E.C.Sierra
- Coelogyne maximae-reginae (de Vogel, Vugt, M.Perry, E.Winkel & Hoogend.) R.Rice
- Coelogyne mayeriana Rchb.f.
- Coelogyne mearnsii (Ames) M.W.Chase & Schuit.
- Coelogyne mediocris (de Vogel) R.Rice
- Coelogyne megacallosa (R.Boos, Naive, Cootes & M.Leon) M.W.Chase & Schuit.
- Coelogyne megalantha (Schltr.) M.W.Chase & Schuit.
- Coelogyne merapiensis (Schltr.) M.W.Chase & Schuit.
- Coelogyne merrillii Ames
- Coelogyne micrantha Lindl.
- Coelogyne microchila (Schltr.) M.W.Chase & Schuit.
- Coelogyne microscopica (J.J.Sm.) M.W.Chase & Schuit.
- Coelogyne microstyla (Schltr.) M.W.Chase & Schuit.
- Coelogyne migueldavidii (Cootes & Cabactulan) M.W.Chase & Schuit.
- Coelogyne mindanaensis (Ames) M.W.Chase & Schuit.
- Coelogyne mindorensis (Ames) M.W.Chase & Schuit.
- Coelogyne miniata (Blume) Lindl.
- Coelogyne minimiflora (Carr) M.W.Chase & Schuit.
- Coelogyne mirabilis (J.J.Wood) M.W.Chase & Schuit.
- Coelogyne missionariorum (Gagnep.) R.Rice
- Coelogyne moi (M.Z.Huang, J.M.Yin & G.S.Yang) M.W.Chase & Schuit.
- Coelogyne monilirachis Carr
- Coelogyne monodii (J.J.Sm.) M.W.Chase & Schuit.
- Coelogyne monticola J.J.Sm.
- Coelogyne mooreana Rolfe
- Coelogyne mossiae Rolfe
- Coelogyne motleyi Rolfe ex J.J.Wood, D.A.Clayton & C.L.Chan
- Coelogyne moultonii J.J.Sm.
- Coelogyne mucronata (J.J.Sm.) M.W.Chase & Schuit.
- Coelogyne multiflora Schltr.
- Coelogyne muluensis J.J.Wood
- Coelogyne muriculata (J.J.Sm.) M.W.Chase & Schuit.
- Coelogyne murudensis (J.J.Wood) M.W.Chase & Schuit.

== N ==
- Coelogyne naja J.J.Sm.
- Coelogyne nervillosa Rchb.f.
- Coelogyne nervosa A.Rich.
- Coelogyne niana (Y.T.Liu, R.Li & C.L.Long) R.Rice
- Coelogyne nitida (Wall. ex D.Don) Lindl.
- Coelogyne nivea (Ames) M.W.Chase & Schuit.

== O ==
- Coelogyne oblonga M.W.Chase & Schuit.
- Coelogyne obtusifolia Carr
- Coelogyne occultata Hook.f.
- Coelogyne ochrolabia (J.J.Wood) M.W.Chase & Schuit.
- Coelogyne odoardi Schltr.
- Coelogyne odorata (Ridl.) M.W.Chase & Schuit.
- Coelogyne odoratissima Lindl.
- Coelogyne ophiopogonoides (J.J.Sm.) M.W.Chase & Schuit.
- Coelogyne oreophila (Ames) M.W.Chase & Schuit.
- Coelogyne ovalis Lindl.
- Coelogyne ovata (J.J.Sm.) M.W.Chase & Schuit.
- Coelogyne oxyglossa (Schltr.) M.W.Chase & Schuit.
- Coelogyne oxyloba (Schltr.) M.W.Chase & Schuit.

== P ==
- Coelogyne pachyglossa (Aver.) R.Rice
- Coelogyne pachyphylla (J.J.Wood & A.Lamb) M.W.Chase & Schuit.
- Coelogyne pachystachya Elis.George & J.-C.George
- Coelogyne palawanensis Ames
- Coelogyne pallens Ridl.
- Coelogyne pallida (Lindl.) Rchb.f.
- Coelogyne pallide-flavens (Blume) M.W.Chase & Schuit.
- Coelogyne panchaseensis (Subedi) M.W.Chase & Schuit.
- Coelogyne pandurata Lindl.
- Coelogyne pandurichila (J.J.Wood) M.W.Chase & Schuit.
- Coelogyne panduriformis M.W.Chase & Schuit.
- Coelogyne pangasinanensis (Ames) M.W.Chase & Schuit.
- Coelogyne pantlingii Lucksom
- Coelogyne papillilabia (J.J.Wood) M.W.Chase & Schuit.
- Coelogyne papillitepala (J.J.Wood) M.W.Chase & Schuit.
- Coelogyne papillosa Ridl.
- Coelogyne parishii Hook.f.
- Coelogyne parvipapillata (H.A.Pedersen) M.W.Chase & Schuit.
- Coelogyne parvula (Ames) M.W.Chase & Schuit.
- Coelogyne pauciflora M.W.Chase & Schuit.
- Coelogyne pectinata (Ames) R.Rice
- Coelogyne peltastes Rchb.f.
- Coelogyne pempahisheyana H.J.Chowdhery
- Coelogyne pendula Summerh. ex D.A.Clayton & J.J.Wood
- Coelogyne perplexa (Ames) M.W.Chase & Schuit.
- Coelogyne perrineae (Cabactulan, Cootes, M.Leon, R.B.Pimentel & Binayao) M.W.Chase & Schuit.
- Coelogyne perrinei (Cabactulan, Cootes, M.Leon, R.B.Pimentel & Binayao) M.W.Chase & Schuit.
- Coelogyne phaiostele Ridl.
- Coelogyne philippinensis (Ames) M.W.Chase & Schuit.
- Coelogyne phitamii Aver. & K.S.Nguyen
- Coelogyne pholidotoides J.J.Sm.
- Coelogyne phuhinrongklaensis Ngerns. & Tippayasri
- Coelogyne pianmaensis R.Li & Z.L.Dao
- Coelogyne planiscapa Carr
- Coelogyne plicatissima Ames & C.Schweinf.
- Coelogyne plocoglottoides (H.A.Pedersen) M.W.Chase & Schuit.
- Coelogyne pollucifera (J.J.Sm.) M.W.Chase & Schuit.
- Coelogyne porrecta (Lindl.) Rchb.f.
- Coelogyne prasina Ridl.
- Coelogyne prodigiosa (Ames) M.W.Chase & Schuit.
- Coelogyne prolifera Lindl.
- Coelogyne propinqua (Ames) M.W.Chase & Schuit.
- Coelogyne protracta (Hook.f.) R.Rice
- Coelogyne pseudoporrecta (Seidenf. ex Aver.) R.Rice
- Coelogyne pseudoscripta (T.J.Barkman & J.J.Wood) M.W.Chase & Schuit.
- Coelogyne pseudoviscosa Elis.George, J.-C.George & Rakthai
- Coelogyne pseudowenzelii (H.A.Pedersen) M.W.Chase & Schuit.
- Coelogyne pterogyne (Carr) M.W.Chase & Schuit.
- Coelogyne pubescens (L.O.Williams) M.W.Chase & Schuit.
- Coelogyne pulchella Rolfe
- Coelogyne pulcherrima (Ames) M.W.Chase & Schuit.
- Coelogyne pulogensis (Ames) M.W.Chase & Schuit.
- Coelogyne pulverula Teijsm. & Binn.
- Coelogyne pumila (Rchb.f.) Rchb.f.
- Coelogyne punctulata Lindl.
- Coelogyne putaoensis X.H.Jin, L.A.Ye & Schuit.
- Coelogyne pygmaea (H.J.Chowdhery & G.D.Pal) R.Rice
- Coelogyne pyrranthela (Gagnep.) M.W.Chase & Schuit.

== Q ==
- Coelogyne quadratiloba Gagnep.
- Coelogyne quadricarinata (Shih C.Hsu, Gravend. & de Vogel) M.W.Chase & Schuit.
- Coelogyne quadriloba (Ames) M.W.Chase & Schuit.
- Coelogyne quinquangularis (J.J.Sm.) M.W.Chase & Schuit.
- Coelogyne quinquecallosa (H.A.Pedersen) M.W.Chase & Schuit.
- Coelogyne quinquelamellata Ames
- Coelogyne quisumbingiana (H.A.Pedersen) M.W.Chase & Schuit.

== R ==
- Coelogyne radicosa Ridl.
- Coelogyne radioferens Ames & C.Schweinf.
- Coelogyne raizadae S.K.Jain & S.Das
- Coelogyne ramentacea (J.J.Wood) M.W.Chase & Schuit.
- Coelogyne ramosissima (Ridl.) M.W.Chase & Schuit.
- Coelogyne ravanii (Cootes) M.W.Chase & Schuit.
- Coelogyne recurva (Lindl.) Rchb.f.
- Coelogyne remediosae Ames & Quisumb.
- Coelogyne remota (J.J.Sm.) M.W.Chase & Schuit.
- Coelogyne renae Gravend. & de Vogel
- Coelogyne reniformis (Ames) M.W.Chase & Schuit.
- Coelogyne rhabdobulbon Schltr.
- Coelogyne rhodobulba (Schltr.) M.W.Chase & Schuit.
- Coelogyne rhombea (J.J.Sm.) M.W.Chase & Schuit.
- Coelogyne rhombophora Rchb.f.
- Coelogyne richardsii (Carr) Masam.
- Coelogyne rigida C.S.P.Parish & Rchb.f.
- Coelogyne rigidifolia (J.J.Sm.) M.W.Chase & Schuit.
- Coelogyne rigidiformis Ames & C.Schweinf.
- Coelogyne rigidula (J.J.Sm.) M.W.Chase & Schuit.
- Coelogyne rochussenii de Vriese
- Coelogyne roseans (Schltr.) R.Rice
- Coelogyne rotundilabia (L.O.Williams) M.W.Chase & Schuit.
- Coelogyne rubra (Lindl.) Rchb.f.
- Coelogyne rubrolanata Elis.George & J.-C.George
- Coelogyne rufa (Rolfe) M.W.Chase & Schuit.
- Coelogyne ruidianensis Ormerod
- Coelogyne rumphii Lindl.
- Coelogyne rupicola Carr

== S ==
- Coelogyne saccata (J.J.Wood) M.W.Chase & Schuit.
- Coelogyne saccolabium (Kraenzl.) M.W.Chase & Schuit.
- Coelogyne sagittata (T.C.Hsu, H.C.Hung & Luu) R.Kr.Singh & Sanjeet Kumar
- Coelogyne salmonicolor Rchb.f.
- Coelogyne salvaneraniana W.Suarez
- Coelogyne sanderae Kraenzl. ex O'Brien
- Coelogyne sanderiana Rchb.f.
- Coelogyne sarasinorum Kraenzl.
- Coelogyne schaiblei (H.A.Pedersen, P.O'Byrne & M.A.Clem.) M.W.Chase & Schuit.
- Coelogyne schilleriana Rchb.f. & K.Koch
- Coelogyne schultesii S.K.Jain & S.Das
- Coelogyne schwadtkii Danell
- Coelogyne schweinfurthiana (L.O.Williams) R.Rice
- Coelogyne scripta (Carr) M.W.Chase & Schuit.
- Coelogyne selebica (J.J.Sm.) M.W.Chase & Schuit.
- Coelogyne senagangensis (J.J.Wood) M.W.Chase & Schuit.
- Coelogyne septemcostata J.J.Sm.
- Coelogyne septemnervia (H.A.Pedersen) M.W.Chase & Schuit.
- Coelogyne serratoi (Ames) M.W.Chase & Schuit.
- Coelogyne sigmatochilus (J.J.Sm.) M.W.Chase & Schuit.
- Coelogyne similis (Blume) M.W.Chase & Schuit.
- Coelogyne simplicissima (J.J.Sm.) M.W.Chase & Schuit.
- Coelogyne simulacra (Ames) M.W.Chase & Schuit.
- Coelogyne singalangensis M.W.Chase & Schuit.
- Coelogyne sinuata M.W.Chase & Schuit.
- Coelogyne smithiana (Ames) M.W.Chase & Schuit.
- Coelogyne sondangii Vuong, Aver. & V.H.Bui
- Coelogyne sparsa Rchb.f.
- Coelogyne spathacea (Rchb.f.) M.W.Chase & Schuit.
- Coelogyne spathulata M.W.Chase & Schuit.
- Coelogyne speciosa (Blume) Lindl.
- Coelogyne sphacelata (Ames) M.W.Chase & Schuit.
- Coelogyne spinifera Yudistira, Schuit. & J.Champ.
- Coelogyne squamosa M.W.Chase & Schuit.
- Coelogyne squamulosa J.J.Sm.
- Coelogyne stachyodes (Ridl.) M.W.Chase & Schuit.
- Coelogyne steenisii J.J.Sm.
- Coelogyne stella (J.J.Wood & J.B.Comber) M.W.Chase & Schuit.
- Coelogyne stenobulbum Schltr.
- Coelogyne stenochila Hook.f.
- Coelogyne stenopetala M.W.Chase & Schuit.
- Coelogyne stipitibulbum Holttum
- Coelogyne stricta (D.Don) Schltr.
- Coelogyne strongiae M.W.Chase & Schuit.
- Coelogyne suaveolens (Lindl.) Hook.f.
- Coelogyne subcalceata (Gagnep.) M.W.Chase & Schuit.
- Coelogyne subfusca M.W.Chase & Schuit.
- Coelogyne sublobata (Carr) M.W.Chase & Schuit.
- Coelogyne subobscura M.W.Chase & Schuit.
- Coelogyne subulibrachia (J.J.Sm.) M.W.Chase & Schuit.
- Coelogyne sudora Schuit. & de Vogel
- Coelogyne sulawesiensis M.W.Chase & Schuit.
- Coelogyne sulcata Elis.George & J.-C.George
- Coelogyne sulphurea (Blume) Rchb.f.
- Coelogyne superba R.Rice
- Coelogyne suratii (J.J.Wood) M.W.Chase & Schuit.
- Coelogyne susanae P.J.Cribb & B.A.Lewis
- Coelogyne swaniana Rolfe
- Coelogyne syngei M.W.Chase & Schuit.

== T ==
- Coelogyne taeniophylla (J.J.Sm.) M.W.Chase & Schuit.
- Coelogyne talamauensis (J.J.Sm.) M.W.Chase & Schuit.
- Coelogyne talangana M.W.Chase & Schuit.
- Coelogyne taronensis Hand.-Mazz.
- Coelogyne teleensis (J.J.Wood & J.B.Comber) M.W.Chase & Schuit.
- Coelogyne tenasserimensis Seidenf.
- Coelogyne tenella (Nees & Meyen) M.W.Chase & Schuit.
- Coelogyne tenompokensis Carr
- Coelogyne tenuibulba (Ames) M.W.Chase & Schuit.
- Coelogyne tenuifolia (Ames) M.W.Chase & Schuit.
- Coelogyne tenuis Rolfe
- Coelogyne tenuissima (Kraenzl.) M.W.Chase & Schuit.
- Coelogyne tenuitepala (J.J.Wood) M.W.Chase & Schuit.
- Coelogyne testacea Lindl.
- Coelogyne tetradactylifera (H.A.Pedersen) M.W.Chase & Schuit.
- Coelogyne tiomanensis M.R.Hend.
- Coelogyne tiongiana (Cootes) M.W.Chase & Schuit.
- Coelogyne tokduanbanoyana M.W.Chase & Schuit.
- Coelogyne tomentosa Lindl.
- Coelogyne tommyi Gravend. & P.O'Byrne
- Coelogyne tortilis (H.A.Pedersen) M.W.Chase & Schuit.
- Coelogyne totilabia M.W.Chase & Schuit.
- Coelogyne transversa (Carr) M.W.Chase & Schuit.
- Coelogyne tricallosa (Rolfe) M.W.Chase & Schuit.
- Coelogyne triloba (Ridl.) M.W.Chase & Schuit.
- Coelogyne trilobulata J.J.Sm.
- Coelogyne trinervis Lindl.
- Coelogyne triplicatula Rchb.f.
- Coelogyne tripurensis Adit
- Coelogyne triuncialis P.O'Byrne & J.J.Verm.
- Coelogyne truncata (J.J.Sm.) M.W.Chase & Schuit.
- Coelogyne trusmadiensis (J.J.Wood) M.W.Chase & Schuit.
- Coelogyne tuberculata (J.J.Wood & J.B.Comber) M.W.Chase & Schuit.
- Coelogyne tumida J.J.Sm.
- Coelogyne turpis (Ames) M.W.Chase & Schuit.

== U ==
- Coelogyne uncata (Rchb.f.) M.W.Chase & Schuit.
- Coelogyne undatialata J.J.Sm.
- Coelogyne unguiculata (Carr) Masam.
- Coelogyne unicallosa (L.O.Williams) M.W.Chase & Schuit.
- Coelogyne unicornis (Ames) M.W.Chase & Schuit.
- Coelogyne uniflora Lindl.
- Coelogyne usitana Roeth & O.Gruss
- Coelogyne ustulata C.S.P.Parish & Rchb.f.

== V ==
- Coelogyne vanoverberghii Ames
- Coelogyne veitchii Rolfe
- Coelogyne velutina de Vogel
- Coelogyne ventricosa (Blume) Rchb.f.
- Coelogyne ventrinigra de Vogel, Suksathan & Boonnuang
- Coelogyne venusta Rolfe
- Coelogyne vermicularis J.J.Sm.
- Coelogyne vernicosa (L.O.Williams) M.W.Chase & Schuit.
- Coelogyne veronicae (Cootes) M.W.Chase & Schuit.
- Coelogyne verrucosa S.E.C.Sierra
- Coelogyne vestita (J.J.Sm.) M.W.Chase & Schuit.
- Coelogyne victoria-reginae Q.Liu & S.S.Zhou
- Coelogyne vinhii (Aver. & Averyanova) M.W.Chase & Schuit.
- Coelogyne viscosa Rchb.f.

== W ==
- Coelogyne warrenii (H.A.Pedersen & Gravend.) M.W.Chase & Schuit.
- Coelogyne wattii (King & Pantl.) M.W.Chase & Schuit.
- Coelogyne wenshanica (S.C.Chen & Z.H.Tsi) M.W.Chase & Schuit.
- Coelogyne wenzelii (Ames) M.W.Chase & Schuit.
- Coelogyne wichersii (Schltr.) M.W.Chase & Schuit.
- Coelogyne wilhelmii M.W.Chase & Schuit.
- Coelogyne williamsii (Ames) M.W.Chase & Schuit.
- Coelogyne wlodarczykiana Roeth
- Coelogyne woodiana (Ames) M.W.Chase & Schuit.

== X ==
- Coelogyne xanthobulbon M.W.Chase & Schuit.
- Coelogyne xyrekes Ridl.

== Y ==
- Coelogyne yiii Schuit. & de Vogel
- Coelogyne yongii (J.J.Wood) R.Rice
- Coelogyne yuccifolia (L.O.Williams) M.W.Chase & Schuit.

== Z ==
- Coelogyne zahlbrucknerae Kraenzl.
- Coelogyne zeylanica Hook.f.
- Coelogyne zollingeri (Miq.) M.W.Chase & Schuit.
- Coelogyne zurowetzii Carr
