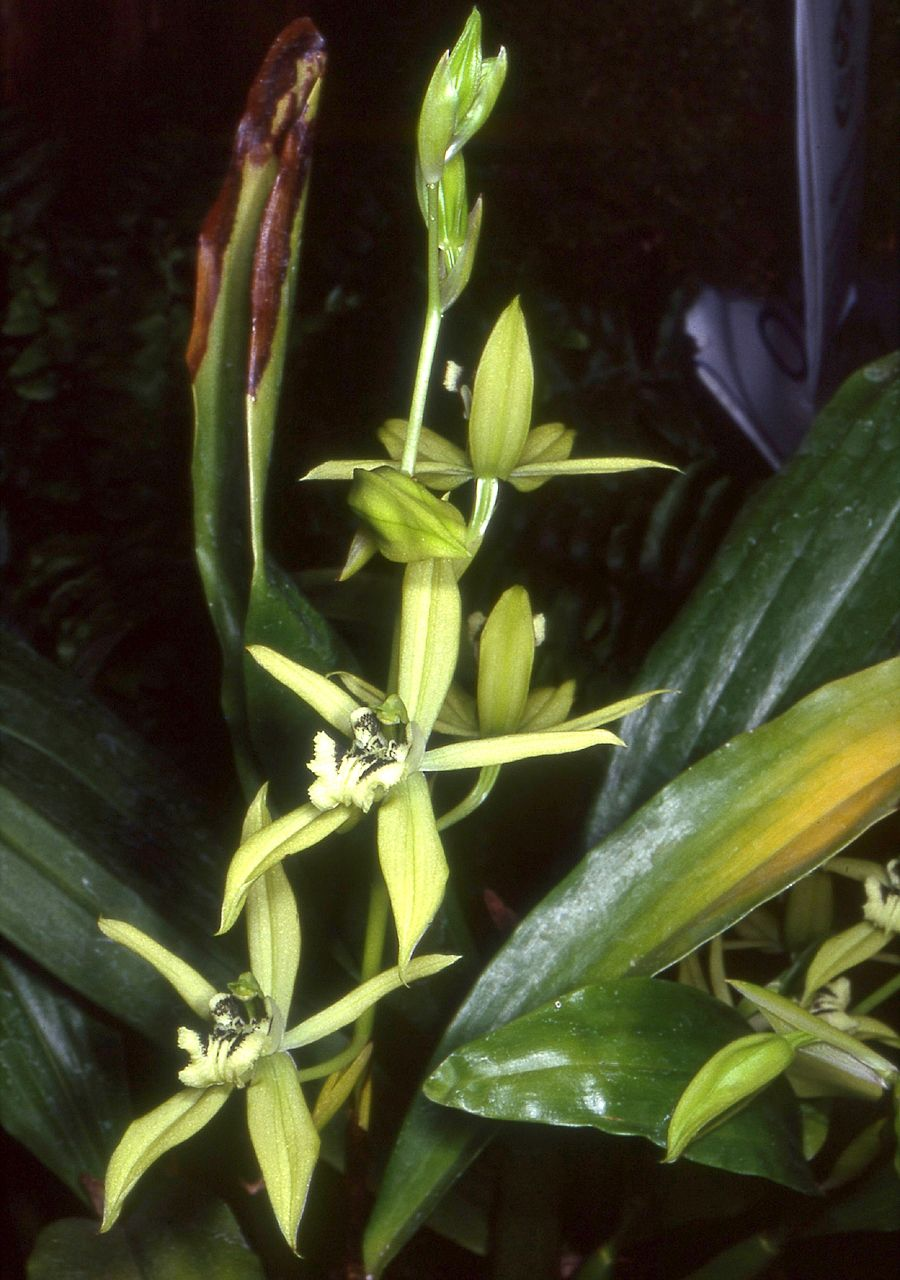

Scientific classification
- Kingdom: Plantae
- Clade: Tracheophytes
- Clade: Angiosperms
- Clade: Monocots
- Order: Asparagales
- Family: Orchidaceae
- Subfamily: Epidendroideae
- Tribe: Arethuseae
- Genus: Coelogyne
- Species: C. virescens

Binomial name
- Coelogyne virescens Rolfe (1908)

= Coelogyne virescens =

Species of orchid

Coelogyne virescens is a species of orchid.
