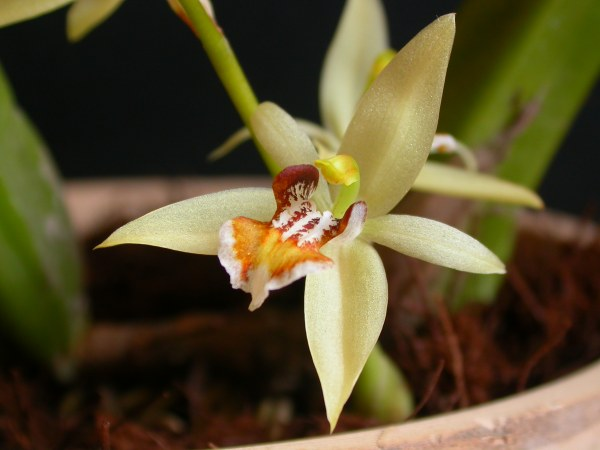

Scientific classification
- Kingdom: Plantae
- Clade: Embryophytes
- Clade: Tracheophytes
- Clade: Angiosperms
- Clade: Monocots
- Order: Asparagales
- Family: Orchidaceae
- Subfamily: Epidendroideae
- Tribe: Arethuseae
- Genus: Coelogyne
- Species: C. lentiginosa

Binomial name
- Coelogyne lentiginosa Lindl. (1854)

Synonyms
- Pleione lentiginosa (Lindl.) Kuntze (1891)

= Coelogyne lentiginosa =

Species of orchid

Coelogyne lentiginosa is a species of orchid.
