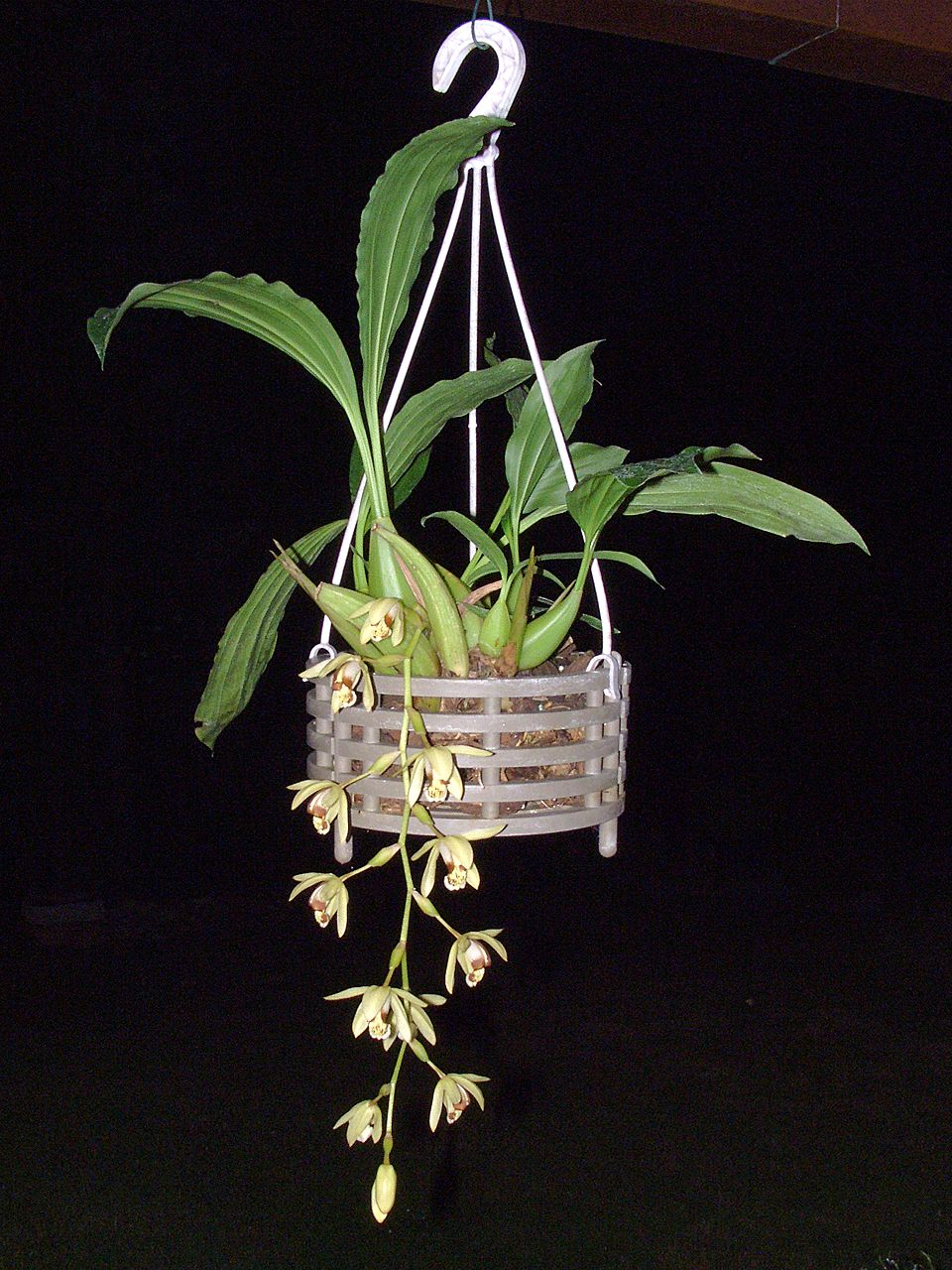

Scientific classification
- Kingdom: Plantae
- Clade: Tracheophytes
- Clade: Angiosperms
- Clade: Monocots
- Order: Asparagales
- Family: Orchidaceae
- Subfamily: Epidendroideae
- Tribe: Arethuseae
- Genus: Coelogyne
- Species: C. tomentosa

Binomial name
- Coelogyne tomentosa Lindl. (1854)

Synonyms
- Coelogyne massangeana Rchb.f. (1878); Pleione tomentosa (Lindl.) Kuntze (1891); Pleione massangeana (Rchb.f.) Kuntze (1891); Coelogyne densiflora Ridl. (1903); Coelogyne dayana var. massangeana Ridl. (1907); Coelogyne cymbidioides Ridl. (1908)

= Coelogyne tomentosa =

Necklace orchid

Species of orchid

Coelogyne tomentosa (necklace orchid) is a species of Orchid.

Media related to Coelogyne tomentosa at Wikimedia Commons
