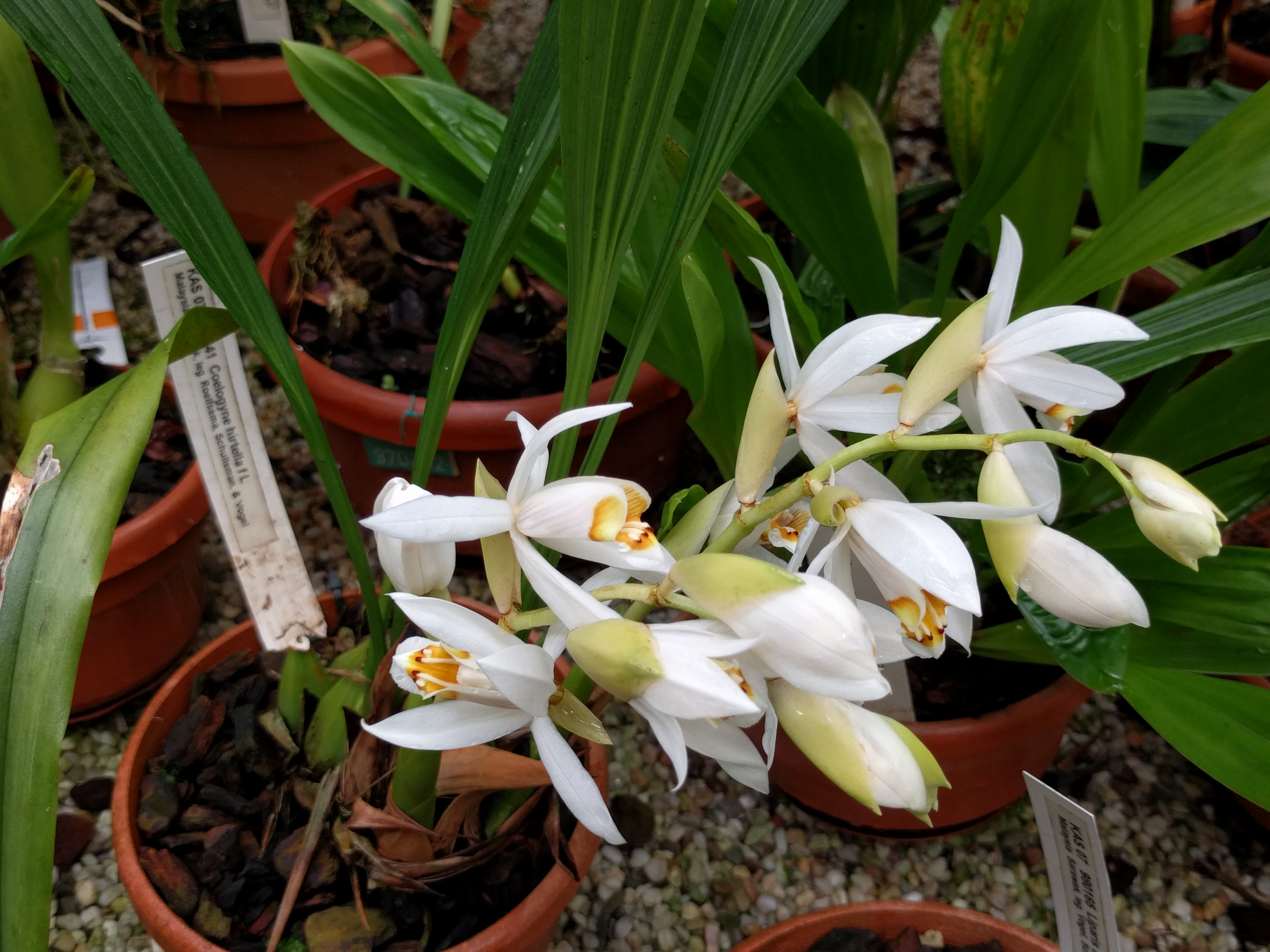

Scientific classification
- Kingdom: Plantae
- Clade: Tracheophytes
- Clade: Angiosperms
- Clade: Monocots
- Order: Asparagales
- Family: Orchidaceae
- Subfamily: Epidendroideae
- Tribe: Arethuseae
- Genus: Coelogyne
- Species: C. hirtella

Binomial name
- Coelogyne hirtella J.J. Sm. 1931

= Coelogyne hirtella =

Species of orchid

Coelogyne hirtella is an orchid endemic to Borneo.
