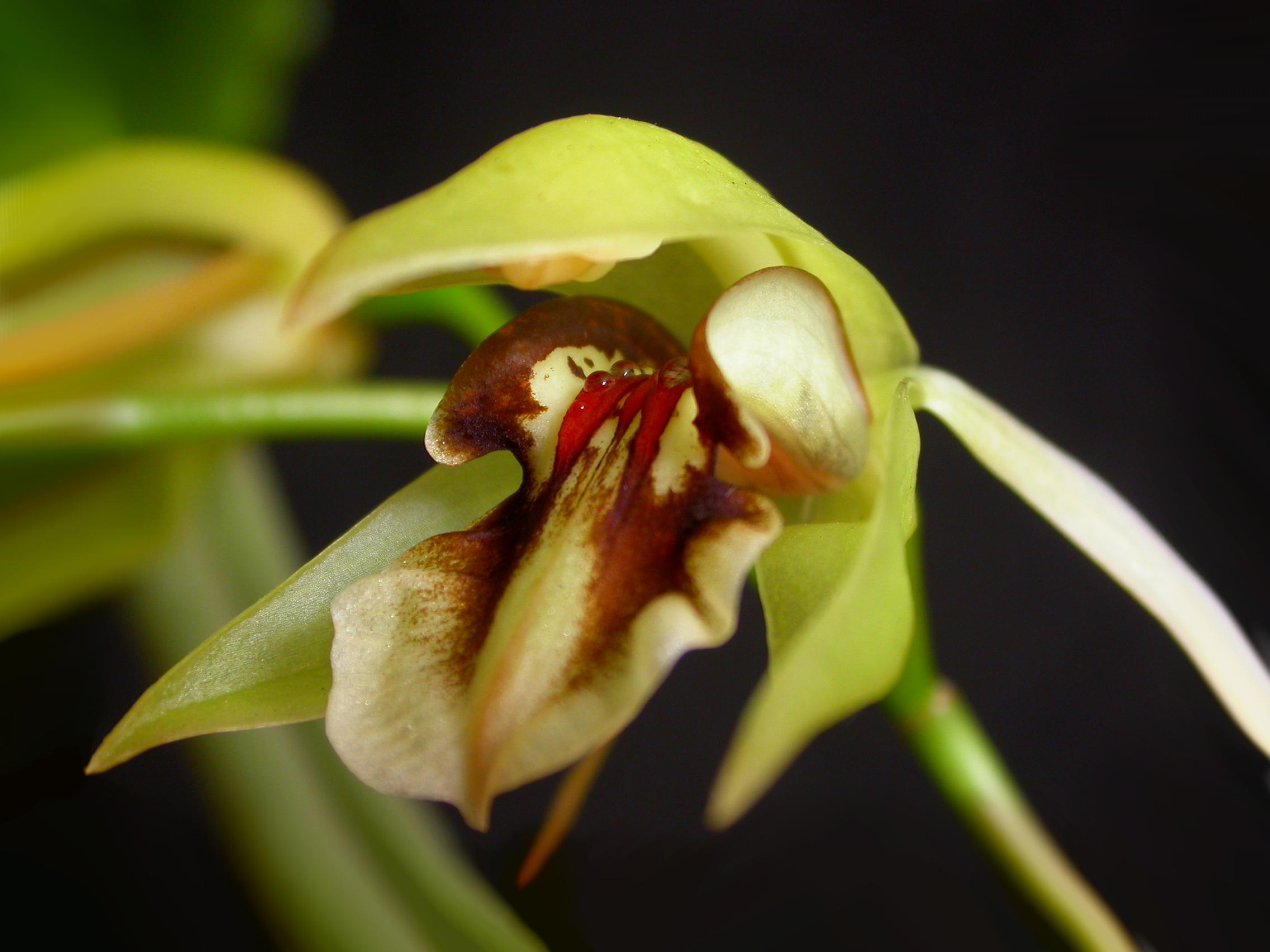

Scientific classification
- Kingdom: Plantae
- Clade: Tracheophytes
- Clade: Angiosperms
- Clade: Monocots
- Order: Asparagales
- Family: Orchidaceae
- Subfamily: Epidendroideae
- Tribe: Arethuseae
- Genus: Coelogyne
- Species: C. fuscescens

Binomial name
- Coelogyne fuscescens Lindl. (1830)

Synonyms
- Pleione fuscescens (Lindl.) Kuntze (1891)

= Coelogyne fuscescens =

Species of plant

Coelogyne fuscescens is a species of orchid. It is found in Nepal, India, Sikkim, Bhutan, lower Myanmar, China and northeastern Thailand.
