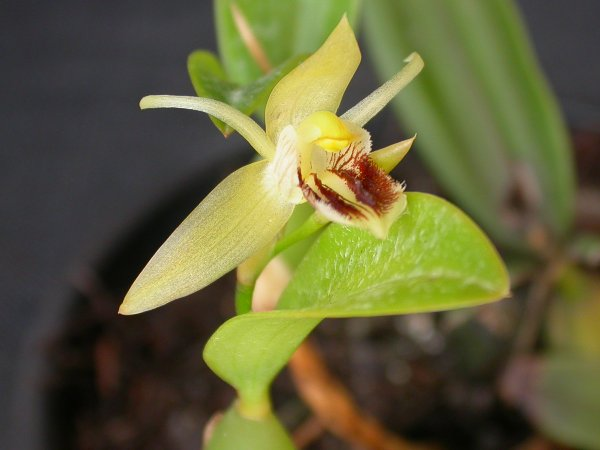

Scientific classification
- Kingdom: Plantae
- Clade: Tracheophytes
- Clade: Angiosperms
- Clade: Monocots
- Order: Asparagales
- Family: Orchidaceae
- Subfamily: Epidendroideae
- Tribe: Arethuseae
- Genus: Coelogyne
- Species: C. ovalis

Binomial name
- Coelogyne ovalis Lindl. (1838)

Synonyms
- Coelogyne decora Wall. ex Voigt (1845); Coelogyne pilosissima Planch. (1858)

= Coelogyne ovalis =

Species of orchid

Coelogyne ovalis is a species of orchid found in East Asia.
