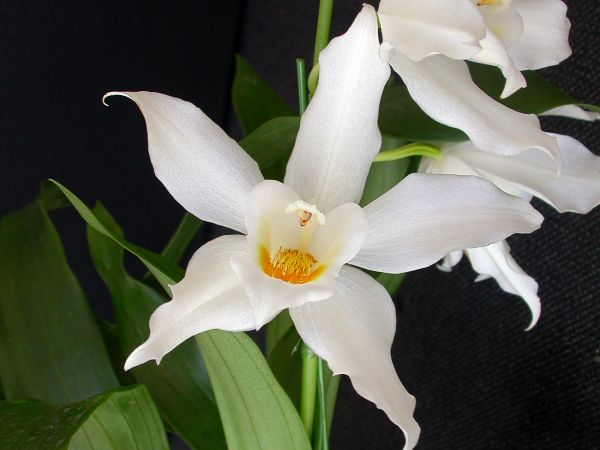

Scientific classification
- Kingdom: Plantae
- Clade: Tracheophytes
- Clade: Angiosperms
- Clade: Monocots
- Order: Asparagales
- Family: Orchidaceae
- Subfamily: Epidendroideae
- Tribe: Arethuseae
- Genus: Coelogyne
- Species: C. mooreana

Binomial name
- Coelogyne mooreana Rolfe (1907)

Synonyms
- Coelogyne psectrantha Gagnep. (1930); Coelogyne mooreana f. alba Roeth & O. Gruss (2001)

= Coelogyne mooreana =

Species of orchid

Coelogyne mooreana is a species of orchid, endemic to Vietnam.
