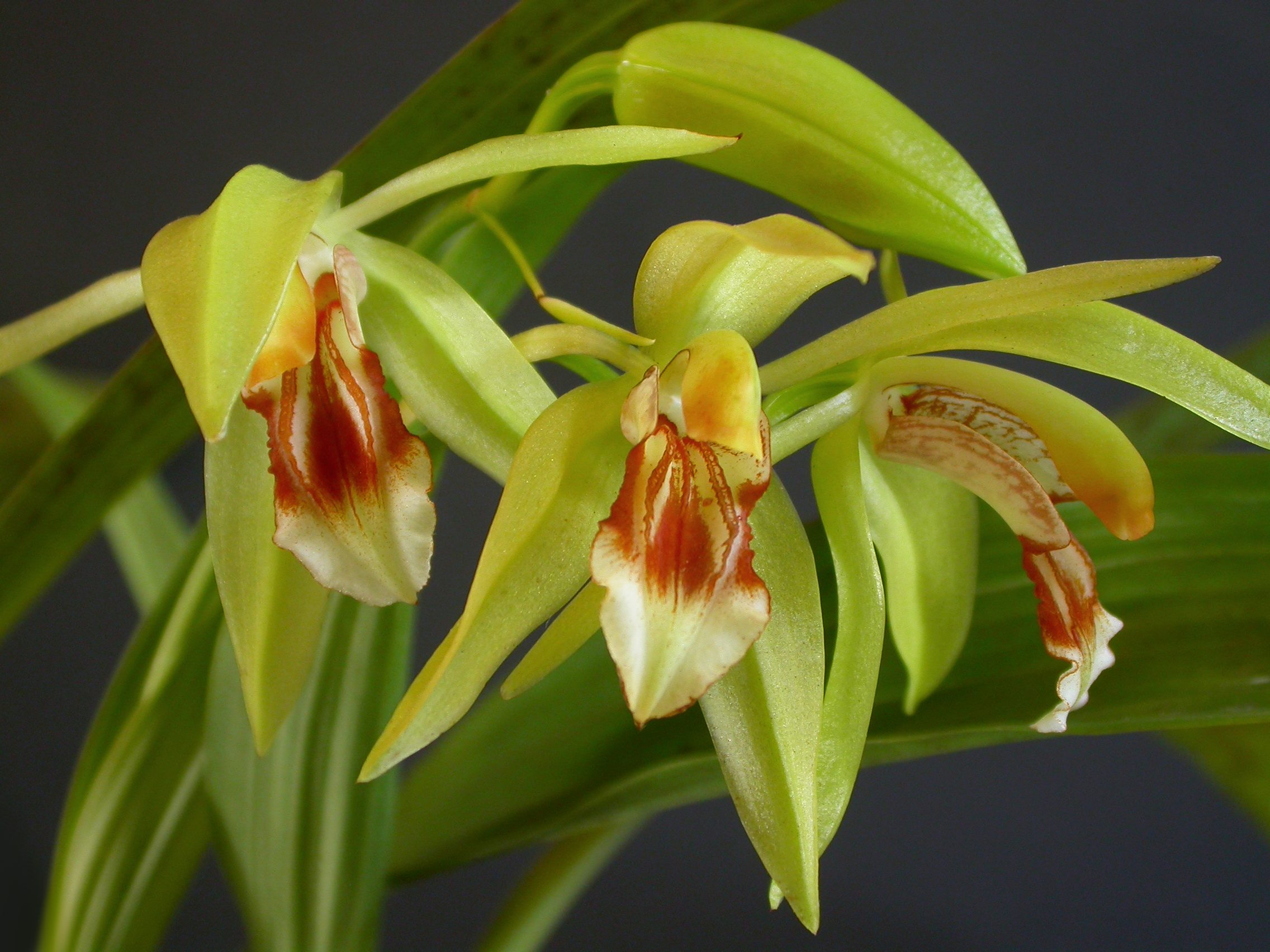

Scientific classification
- Kingdom: Plantae
- Clade: Tracheophytes
- Clade: Angiosperms
- Clade: Monocots
- Order: Asparagales
- Family: Orchidaceae
- Subfamily: Epidendroideae
- Tribe: Arethuseae
- Genus: Coelogyne
- Species: C. fuerstenbergiana

Binomial name
- Coelogyne fuerstenbergiana Schltr. (1914)

= Coelogyne fuerstenbergiana =

Species of orchid

Coelogyne fuerstenbergiana is a species of orchid.
