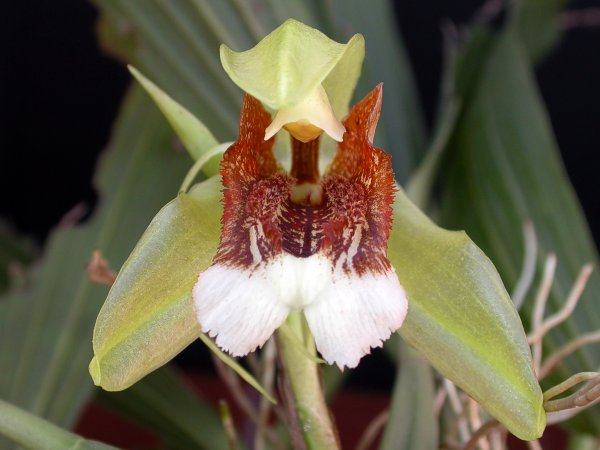

Scientific classification
- Kingdom: Plantae
- Clade: Tracheophytes
- Clade: Angiosperms
- Clade: Monocots
- Order: Asparagales
- Family: Orchidaceae
- Subfamily: Epidendroideae
- Tribe: Arethuseae
- Genus: Coelogyne
- Species: C. speciosa

Binomial name
- Coelogyne speciosa (Blume) Lindl. (1833)

Synonyms
- Chelonanthera speciosa Blume (1825) (Basionym); Pleione speciosa (Blume) Kuntze (1891)

= Coelogyne speciosa =

Species of orchid

Coelogyne speciosa is a species of orchid found in Malaysia and Indonesia (Java, Sumatra, Kalimantan). This epiphyte grows on tree trunks in forests of mountainous areas between 700 meters and 2000 meters of elevation. It likes cool temperatures and a high level of indirect light. The size of the plant ranges from 40 to 60 cm.

From spring through fall, it produces one to two flowers on short spikes growing from the base of existing pseudo-bulbs. Once the flower fades, the spike will form a leaf and a new pseudo-bulb will develop once the leaf reaches full size.
