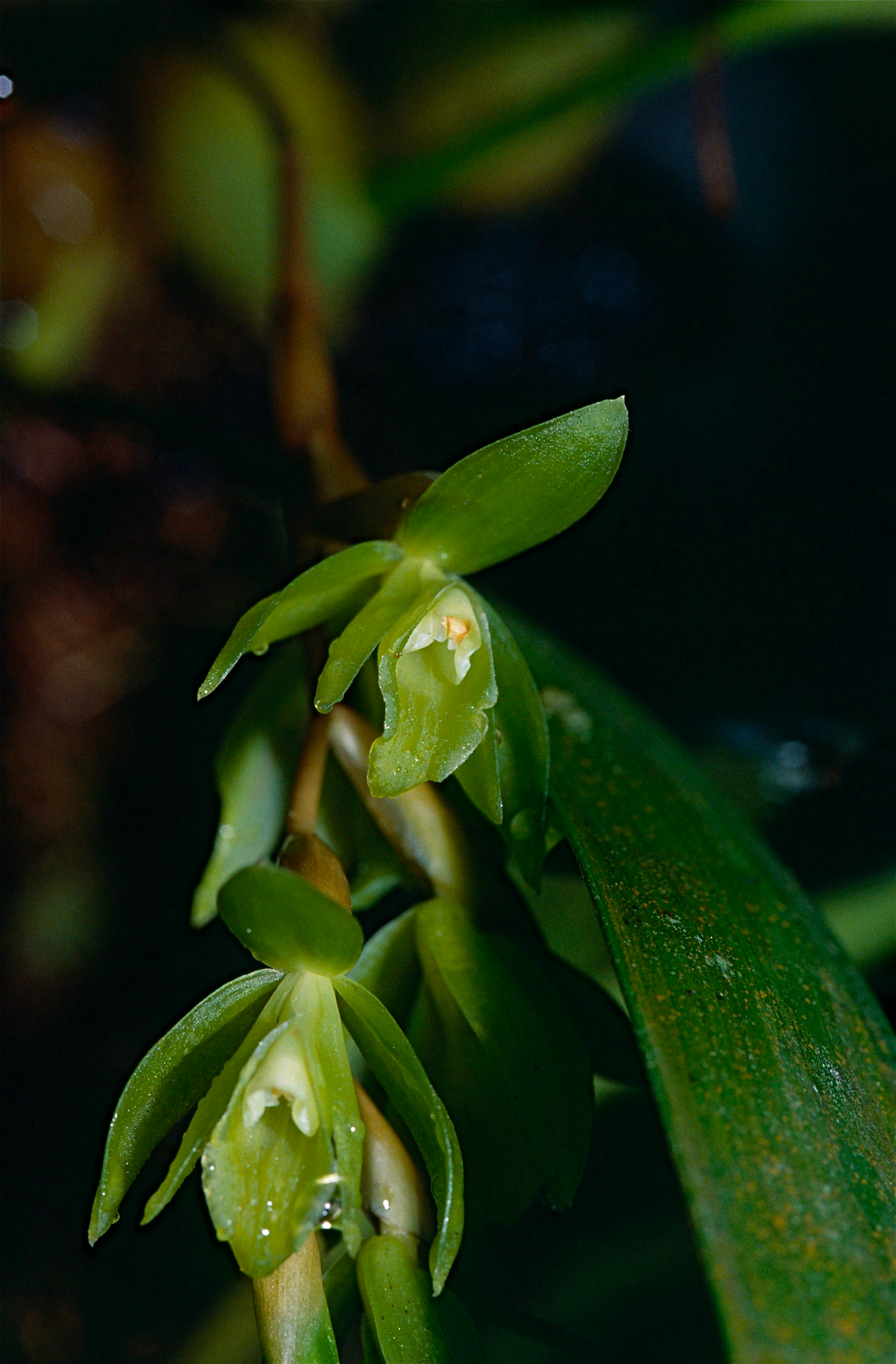

Scientific classification
- Kingdom: Plantae
- Clade: Tracheophytes
- Clade: Angiosperms
- Clade: Monocots
- Order: Asparagales
- Family: Orchidaceae
- Subfamily: Epidendroideae
- Tribe: Arethuseae
- Genus: Coelogyne
- Species: C. exalata

Binomial name
- Coelogyne exalata Ridl. 1908

= Coelogyne exalata =

Species of orchid

Coelogyne exalata is an orchid endemic to Borneo.
