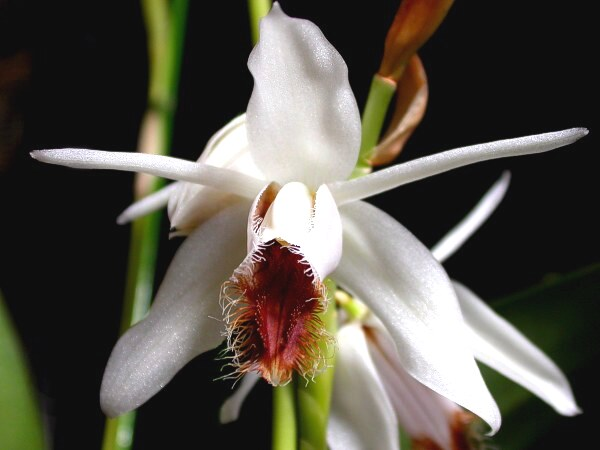

Scientific classification
- Kingdom: Plantae
- Clade: Tracheophytes
- Clade: Angiosperms
- Clade: Monocots
- Order: Asparagales
- Family: Orchidaceae
- Subfamily: Epidendroideae
- Tribe: Arethuseae
- Genus: Coelogyne
- Species: C. barbata

Binomial name
- Coelogyne barbata Lindl. ex Griff.

Synonyms
- Pleione barbata (Lindl. ex Griff.) Kuntze

= Coelogyne barbata =

Species of orchid

Coelogyne barbata is a species of flowering plant in the family Orchidaceae. It is a shade-loving orchid that blooms in the months of October–November. It occurs in the Himalayas, Nepal, India, China and Myanmar. It grows epiphytic on trees or lithophyte on rocks in lower montane forests at an altitude of 1000 to 1800 meters above sea level. It is also found in Phalee (geographical coordinates 25.143524,94.28334) but is rare. It has long, broad leaves and a bulb stem that grows from the roots. It blooms in September- November. It's a shade loving orchid.

It is also called as the Bearded Coelogyne. It is a small to medium-sized, cool growing epiphyte or lithophyte with clustered, ovoid to pear shaped, angular, longitudinally grooved, pale green, 2.5 to 8.5 cm in length and 1.5 to 4.5 cm in width pseudobulbs enveloped completely by imbricate, persistent, papery sheaths and carrying 2, oblong-lanceolate, acuminate, coriaceous, plicate, 9-nerved, undulate, 25–30 cm long and 6 cm wide leaves.
