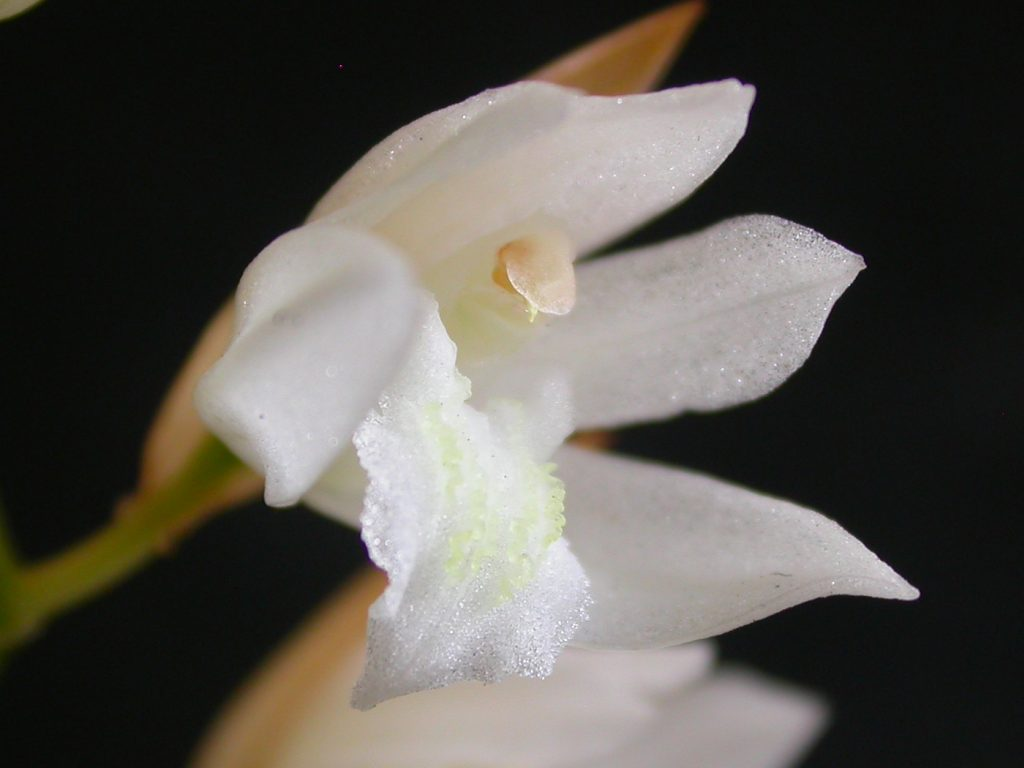

Scientific classification
- Kingdom: Plantae
- Clade: Embryophytes
- Clade: Tracheophytes
- Clade: Angiosperms
- Clade: Monocots
- Order: Asparagales
- Family: Orchidaceae
- Subfamily: Epidendroideae
- Tribe: Arethuseae
- Genus: Coelogyne
- Species: C. suaveolens

Binomial name
- Coelogyne suaveolens (Lindl.) Hook.f. (1890)

Synonyms
- Pholidota suaveolens Lindl. (1856) (Basionym); Pleione suaveolens (Lindl.) Kuntze (1891)

= Coelogyne suaveolens =

Species of orchid

Coelogyne suaveolens is a species of orchid native to central China, Assam, the eastern Himalayas and Thailand.

== Taxonomy ==
The species was first described in 1856 by John Lindley as Pholidota suaveolens, in the Gardeners' Chronicle. It was transferred to the genus Coelogyne by Joseph Hooker in 1890, in his Flora of British India, giving rise to the currently accepted name Coelogyne suaveolens (Lindl.) Hook.f. An earlier combination, Pleione suaveolens (Lindl.) Kuntze, published by Otto Kuntze in 1891, is treated as a synonym. The specific epithet suaveolens is Latin for "sweet-smelling", referring to the fragrance of the flowers. Within the traditional sectional classification of Coelogyne, the species is placed in section Lentiginosae.

== Description ==
Coelogyne suaveolens is a small to medium-sized, warm- to cool-growing epiphyte with ovoid, obtuse pseudobulbs spaced 3–6 cm apart along the rhizome and enclosed basally by a few sheaths when young. Each pseudobulb bears a pair of apical, elliptic-lanceolate, plicate, nine-nerved leaves with undulate margins, narrowing gradually below into a grooved, petiolate base. The inflorescence, produced from a newly emerging pseudobulb in spring, is a fractiflex (zig-zagged) rachis around 15 cm long bearing many fragrant flowers with deciduous floral bracts; the flowers open in succession rather than simultaneously, with two or three open at any one time.

== Distribution and habitat ==
The species occurs in central China, Assam, the eastern Himalayas and Thailand. It grows as an epiphyte in lower montane, evergreen broad-leaved forest at elevations of about 900 to 1,500 metres.

== Phytochemistry and pharmacology ==
A 2024 study by Eva, Mamurat, Rahat and Hossen investigated the phytochemistry and pharmacological activity of Coelogyne suaveolens bulb and root extracts. Gas chromatography–mass spectrometry (GC–MS) analysis of the ethyl acetate fraction of an acetonic extract identified 16 compounds from the bulb and a further 16 from the root, each associated with a range of known phytochemical activities.

In dose-dependent in vivo testing on Swiss albino mice, root and bulb extracts showed significant analgesic activity in the acetic-acid-induced writhing, hot-plate and tail-immersion tests, alongside anxiolytic and sedative effects. Molecular docking analysis of the identified compounds pointed to potential activity against cyclooxygenase enzymes as a plausible mechanism for the observed analgesic effect, leading the authors to suggest the species as a candidate for further investigation as a source of pain, anxiety and sleep-disorder therapeutics.

A related 2024 study by mostly the same research group, focused specifically on antimicrobial activity, identified bioactive compounds in the ethyl acetate fraction by GC–MS and tested antibacterial effects by the disc diffusion method. Significant antibacterial activity was found against Pseudomonas aeruginosa, Staphylococcus aureus, Escherichia coli and Klebsiella pneumoniae; molecular docking was used to propose possible bioactive compounds and mechanisms underlying this activity.
