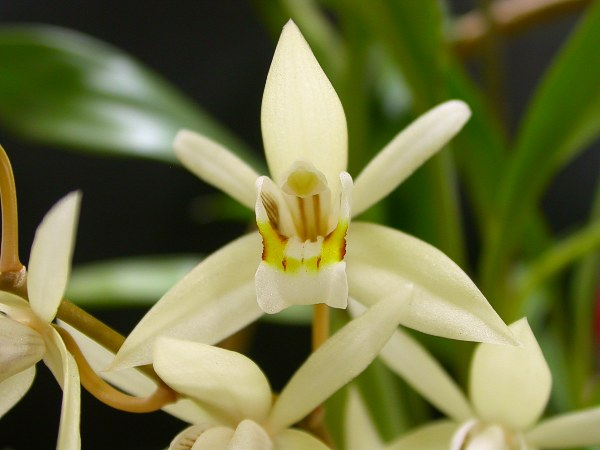

Scientific classification
- Kingdom: Plantae
- Clade: Embryophytes
- Clade: Tracheophytes
- Clade: Spermatophytes
- Clade: Angiosperms
- Clade: Monocots
- Order: Asparagales
- Family: Orchidaceae
- Subfamily: Epidendroideae
- Tribe: Arethuseae
- Genus: Coelogyne
- Species: C. flaccida

Binomial name
- Coelogyne flaccida Lindl. (1830)

Synonyms
- Pleione flaccida (Lindl.) Kuntze (1891); Coelogyne esquirolii Schltr. (1919); Coelogyne flaccida var. longiracemosa Roeth (2006)

= Coelogyne flaccida =

Species of orchid

Coelogyne flaccida is a species of orchid that is native to southeast Asia and northeastern South Asia. Cultivated as an ornamental plant, it is also known as the bearded coelogyne and the loose coelogyne.

== Description ==
A shade loving orchid, it is a small to medium-sized, cool growing epiphyte or lithophyte reaching 42 cm in height with conical, ovoid to pear shaped, angular, longitudinally grooved, 2.5 to 8.5 cm in length and 1.5 to 4.5 cm in width pseudobulbs that are enveloped completely by imbricate, persistent, papery sheaths and carrying 2, oblong-lanceolate, acuminate, coriaceous, plicate, 9-nerved, undulate, 25–30 cm long and 6 cm wide leaves.

=== Inflorescence ===
Flowering occurs in summer by means of a racemose inflorescence, protruding from the base of a mature pseudobulb, slender, on average 25 centimeters long, covered with floral bracts and carrying from few to many (5 to 12) flowers. These are on average 4 or 5 centimeters large, open at the same time, have no long life, are very fragrant (not too pleasantly), have a waxy consistency and are cream colored. The sepals are lanceolate, larger than the petals which are of the same shape, while the labellum is trilobed with raised lateral lobes and has yellow and dark red spots.

== Distribution and habitat ==
It occurs in the Himalayas, Nepal, North India, Bhutan, China (Yunnan to Western Guangxi) and Myanmar. It grows epiphytic on trees or lithophyte on rocks in lower montane forests at an altitude of 1000 to 1800 meters above sea level.

== Cultivation ==
They are best grown in pots as hanging plants and require a shady location, fearing full sunlight and cold temperatures. In the growing season they need to be watered. These plants should be grown in medium consistency and well drained soil, such as fir bark.
