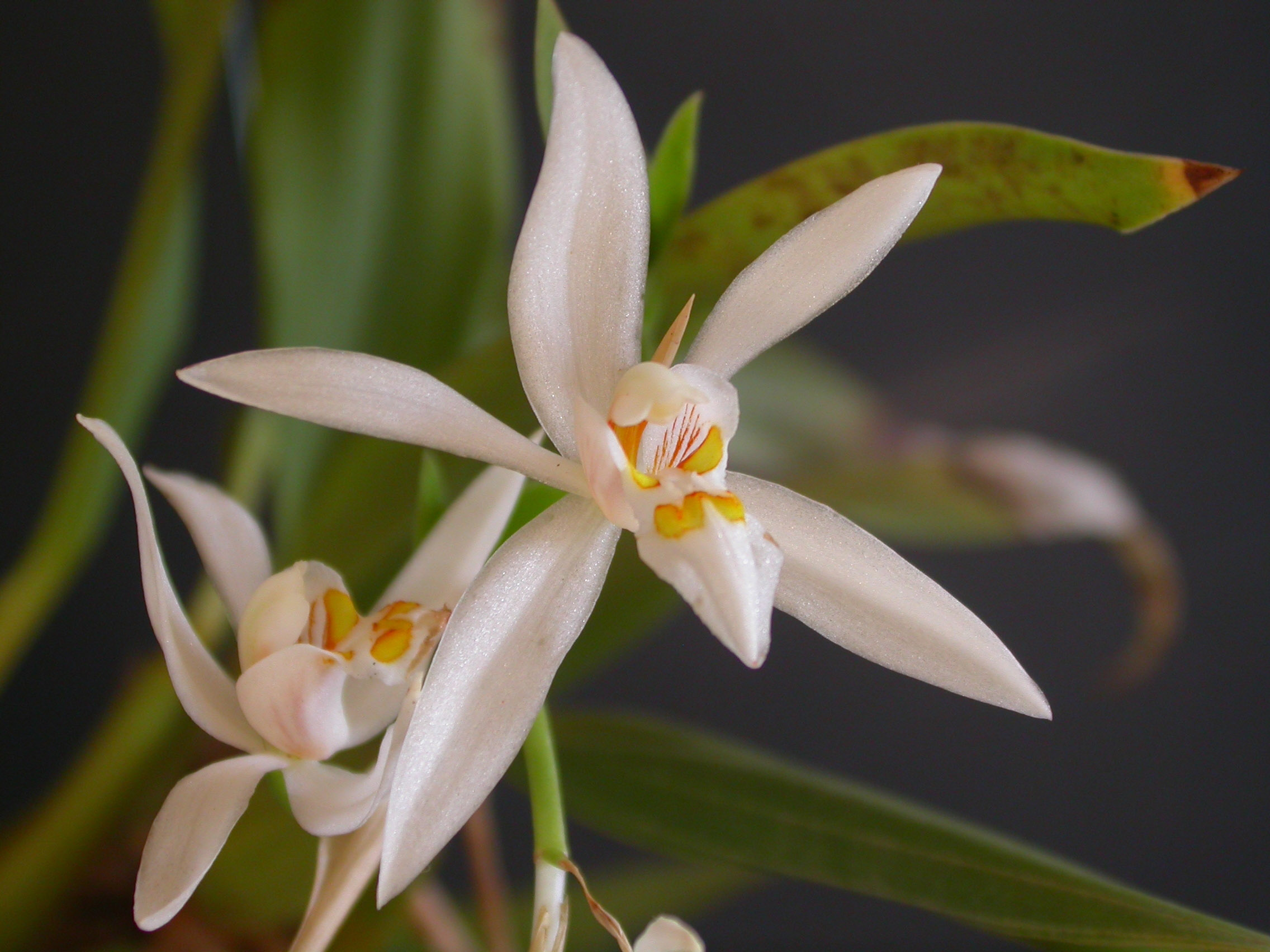

Scientific classification
- Kingdom: Plantae
- Clade: Tracheophytes
- Clade: Angiosperms
- Clade: Monocots
- Order: Asparagales
- Family: Orchidaceae
- Subfamily: Epidendroideae
- Tribe: Arethuseae
- Genus: Coelogyne
- Species: C. corymbosa

Binomial name
- Coelogyne corymbosa Lindl. (1854)

Synonyms
- Pleione corymbosa (Lindl.) Kuntze (1891); Coelogyne taronensis Hand.-Mazz. (1922)

= Coelogyne corymbosa =

Species of orchid

Coelogyne corymbosa is a species of orchid.

Media related to Coelogyne corymbosa at Wikimedia Commons
