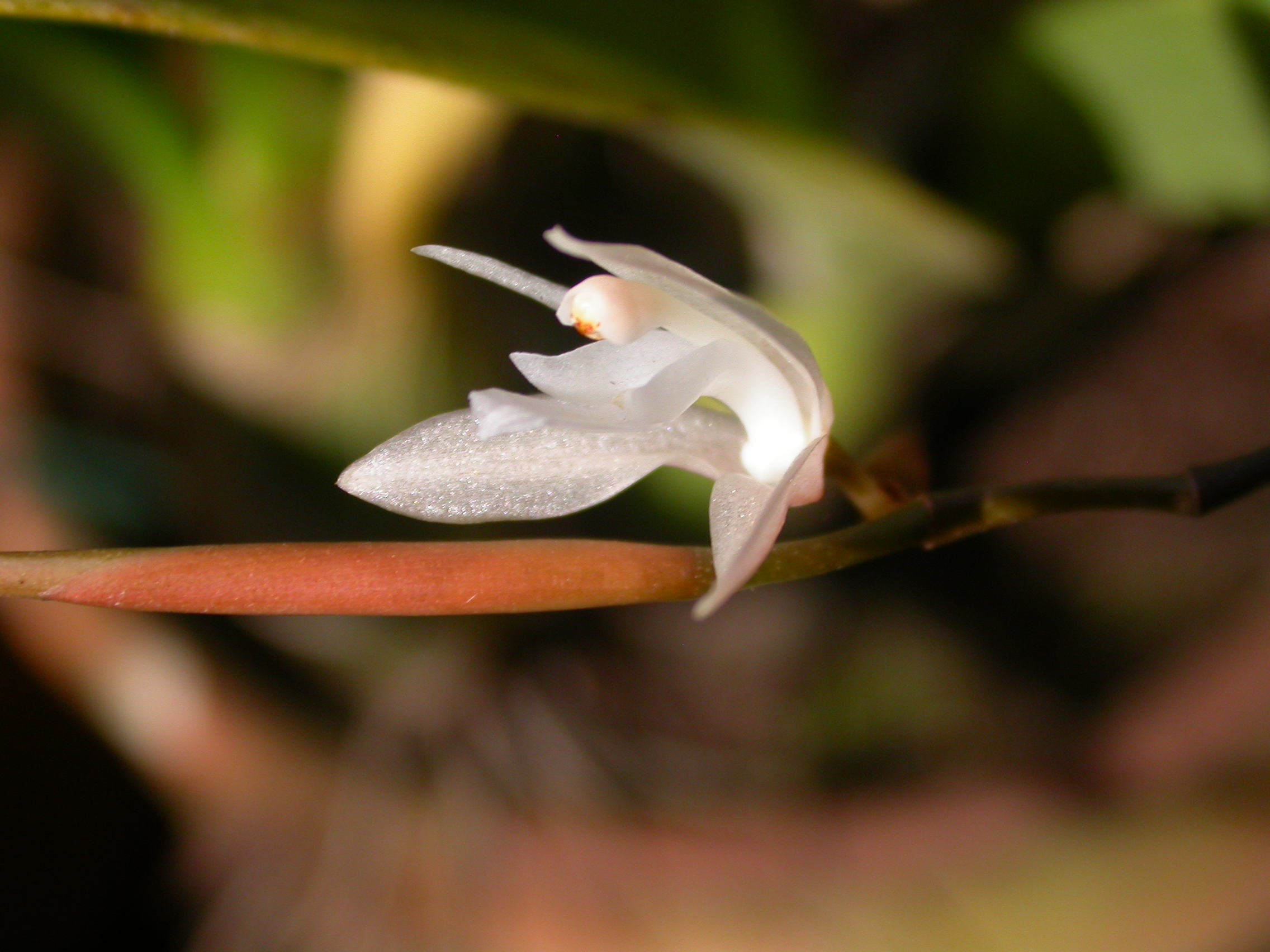

Scientific classification
- Kingdom: Plantae
- Clade: Tracheophytes
- Clade: Angiosperms
- Clade: Monocots
- Order: Asparagales
- Family: Orchidaceae
- Subfamily: Epidendroideae
- Tribe: Arethuseae
- Genus: Coelogyne
- Species: C. tiomanensis

Binomial name
- Coelogyne tiomanensis M.R.Hend.

= Coelogyne tiomanensis =

Species of orchid

Coelogyne tiomanensis is an epiphytic orchid in the family Orchidaceae. It is endemic to Peninsular Malaysia.
