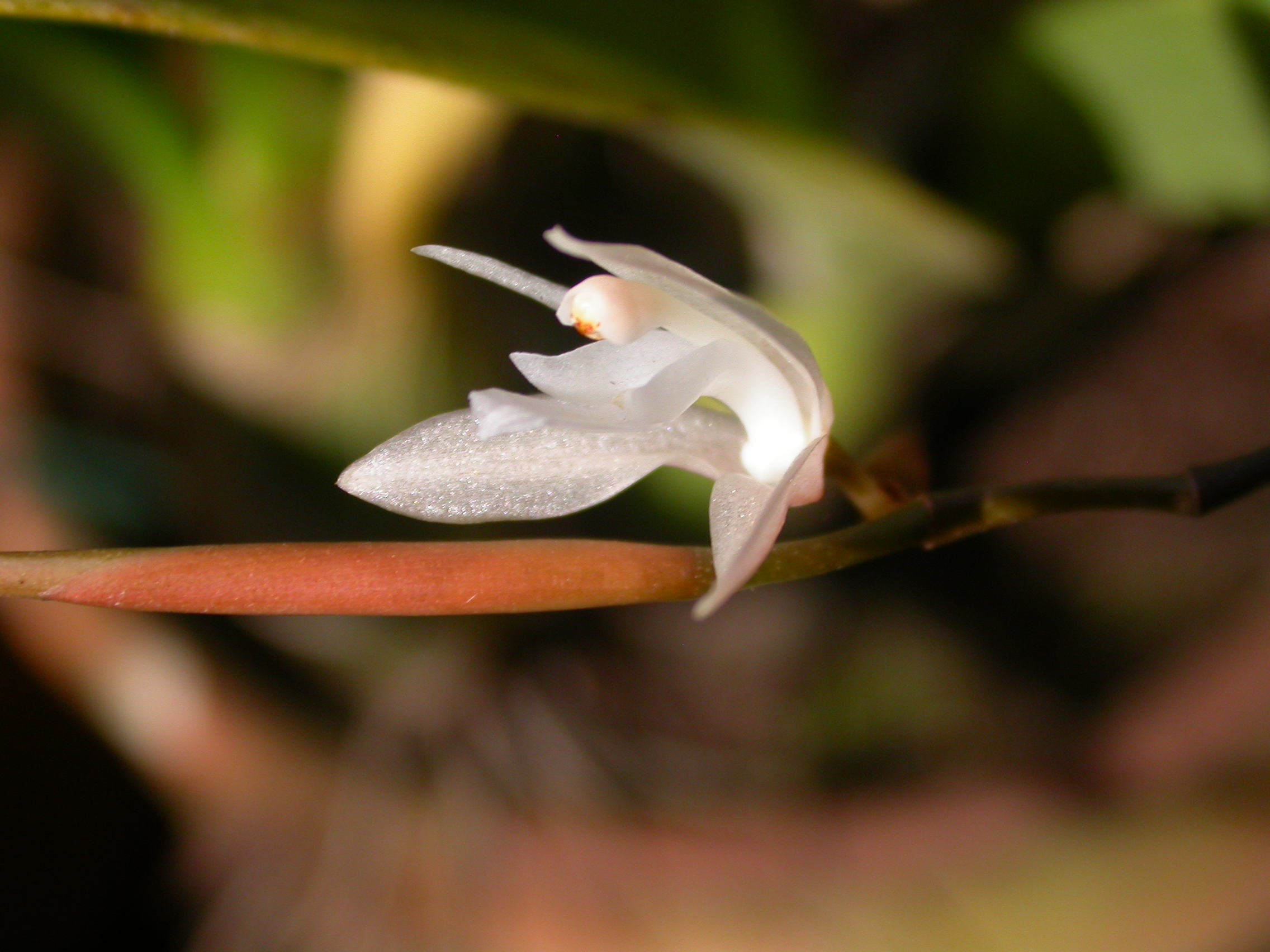

Scientific classification
- Kingdom: Plantae
- Clade: Tracheophytes
- Clade: Angiosperms
- Clade: Monocots
- Order: Asparagales
- Family: Orchidaceae
- Subfamily: Epidendroideae
- Tribe: Arethuseae
- Genus: Coelogyne
- Species: C. bilamellata

Binomial name
- Coelogyne bilamellata Lindl. (1854)

Synonyms
- Panisea bilamellata (Lindl.) Rchb.f. (1861); Pleione bilamellata (Lindl.) Kuntze (1891)

= Coelogyne bilamellata =

Species of orchid

Coelogyne bilamellata is a species of orchid.
