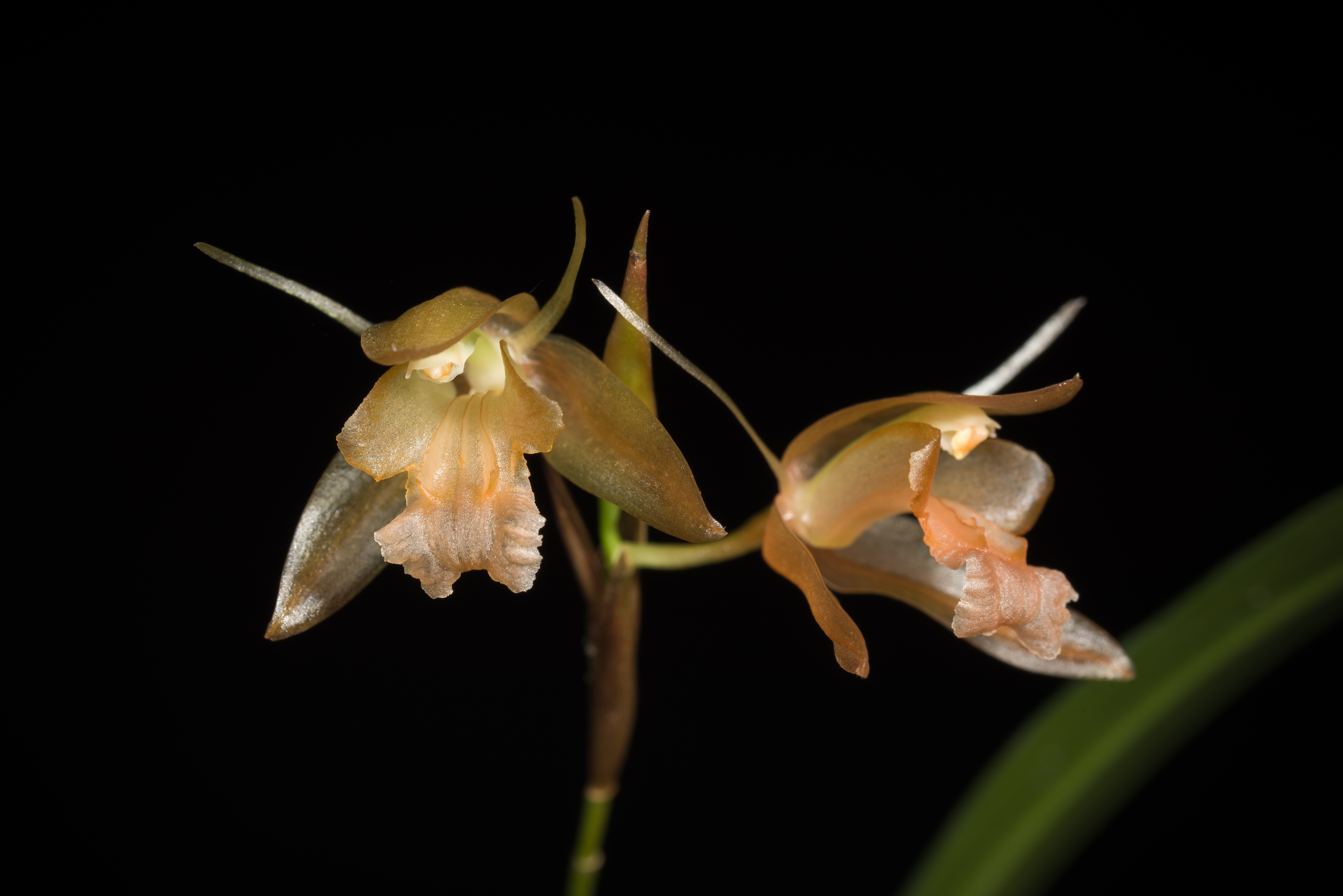

Scientific classification
- Kingdom: Plantae
- Clade: Tracheophytes
- Clade: Angiosperms
- Clade: Monocots
- Order: Asparagales
- Family: Orchidaceae
- Subfamily: Epidendroideae
- Tribe: Arethuseae
- Genus: Coelogyne
- Species: C. planiscapa

Binomial name
- Coelogyne planiscapa Carr 1935

= Coelogyne planiscapa =

Species of orchid

Coelogyne planiscapa is an orchid endemic to Borneo.
