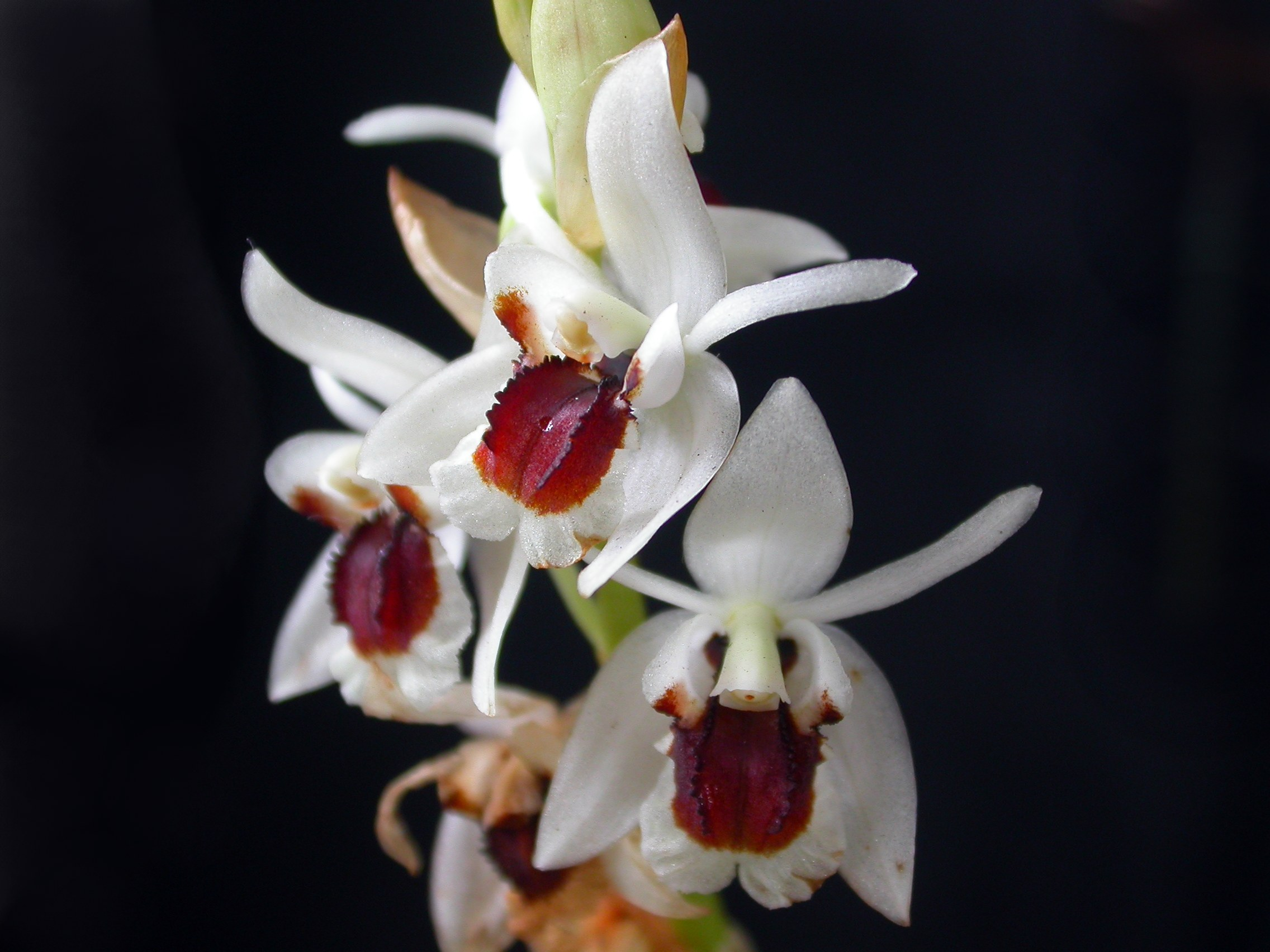

Scientific classification
- Kingdom: Plantae
- Clade: Tracheophytes
- Clade: Angiosperms
- Clade: Monocots
- Order: Asparagales
- Family: Orchidaceae
- Subfamily: Epidendroideae
- Tribe: Arethuseae
- Genus: Coelogyne
- Species: C. pulchella

Binomial name
- Coelogyne pulchella Rolfe (1898)

= Coelogyne pulchella =

Species of orchid

Coelogyne pulchella is a species of orchid.
