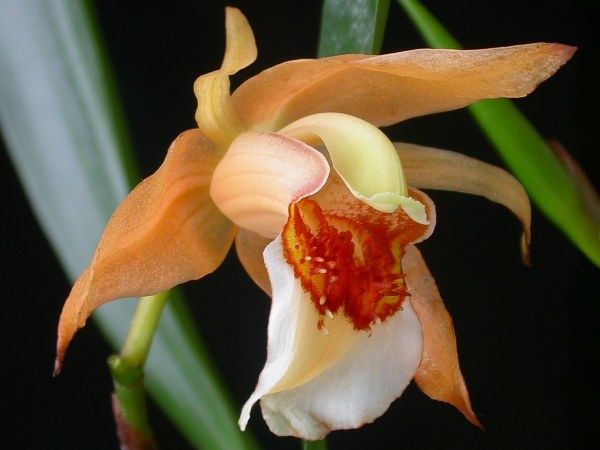

Scientific classification
- Kingdom: Plantae
- Clade: Embryophytes
- Clade: Tracheophytes
- Clade: Spermatophytes
- Clade: Angiosperms
- Clade: Monocots
- Order: Asparagales
- Family: Orchidaceae
- Subfamily: Epidendroideae
- Tribe: Arethuseae
- Genus: Coelogyne
- Species: C. lawrenceana

Binomial name
- Coelogyne lawrenceana Rolfe (1905)

Synonyms
- Coelogyne fleuryi Gagnep. (1930)

= Coelogyne lawrenceana =

Species of orchid

Coelogyne lawrenceana is a species of orchid. It is endemic to Vietnam.
