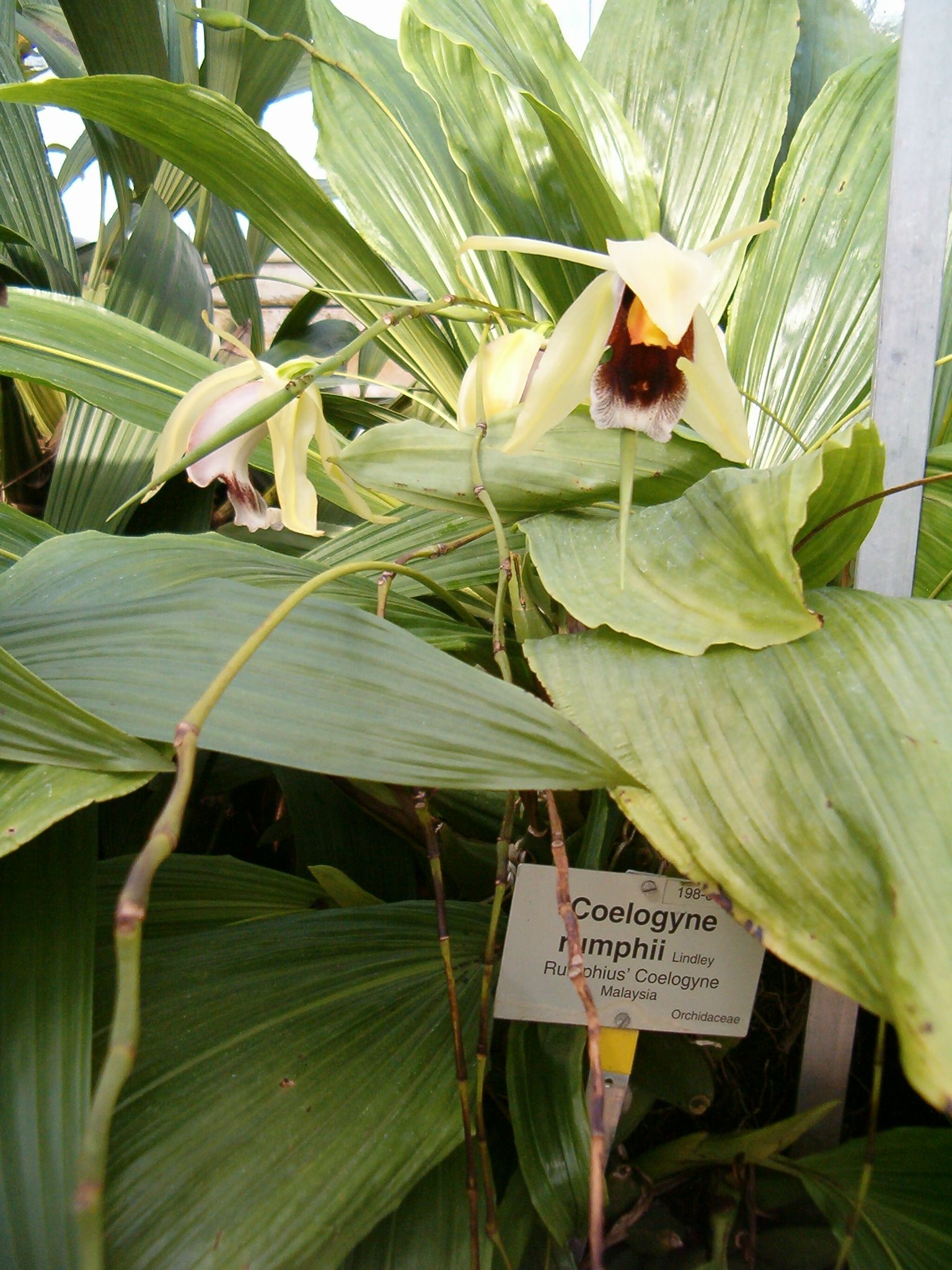

Scientific classification
- Kingdom: Plantae
- Clade: Tracheophytes
- Clade: Angiosperms
- Clade: Monocots
- Order: Asparagales
- Family: Orchidaceae
- Subfamily: Epidendroideae
- Tribe: Arethuseae
- Genus: Coelogyne
- Species: C. rumphii

Binomial name
- Coelogyne rumphii Lindl. (1854)

Synonyms
- Pleione rumphii (Lindl.) Kuntze (1891); Coelogyne psittacina Rchb.f. (1868); Coelogyne psittacina var. huttonii Rchb.f. (1870); Pleione psittacina (Rchb.f.) Kuntze (1891)

= Coelogyne rumphii =

Species of orchid

Coelogyne rumphii is a species of orchid.
