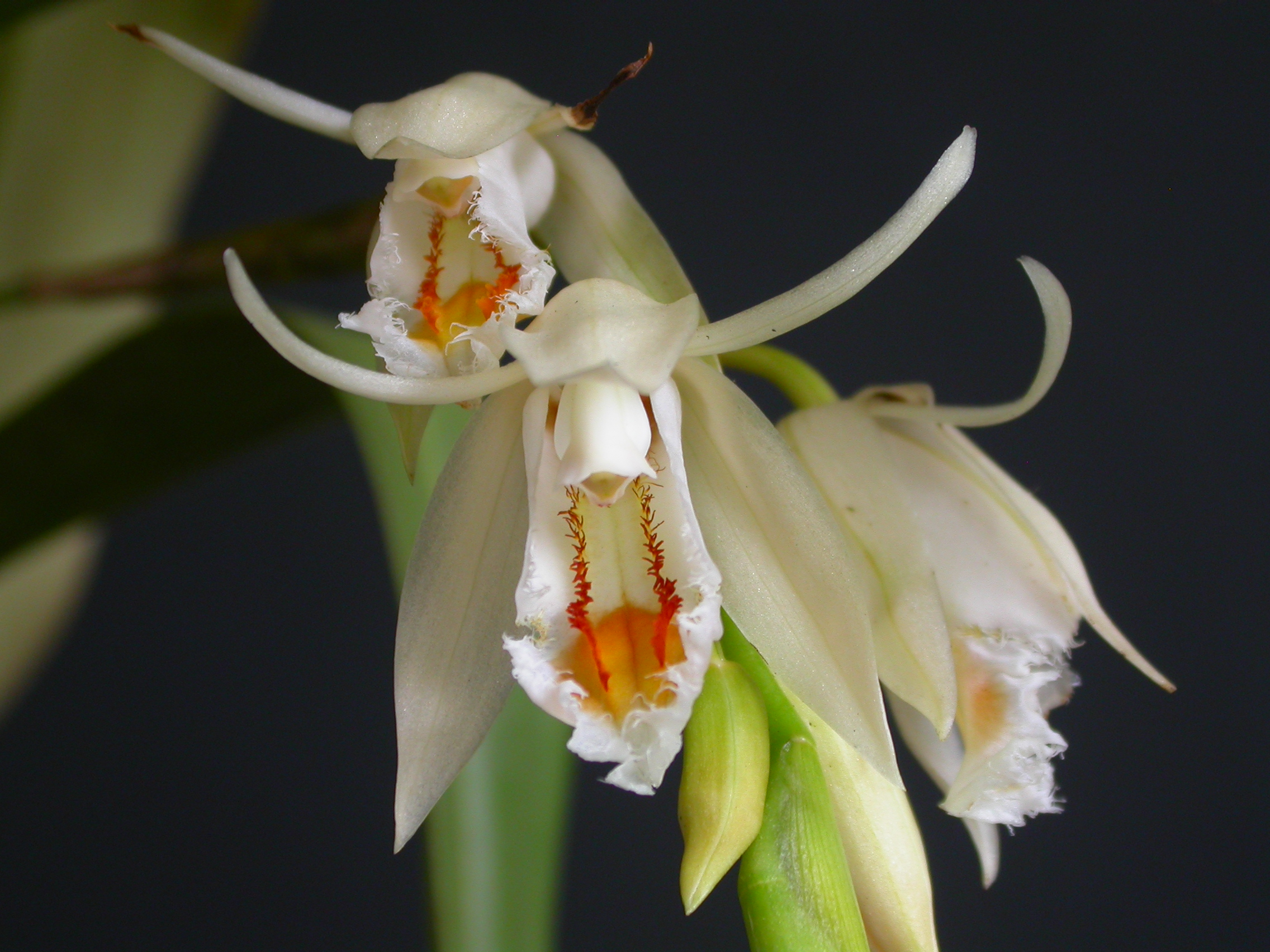

Scientific classification
- Kingdom: Plantae
- Clade: Embryophytes
- Clade: Tracheophytes
- Clade: Angiosperms
- Clade: Monocots
- Order: Asparagales
- Family: Orchidaceae
- Subfamily: Epidendroideae
- Tribe: Arethuseae
- Genus: Coelogyne
- Species: C. calcicola

Binomial name
- Coelogyne calcicola Kerr (1933)

= Coelogyne calcicola =

Species of orchid

Coelogyne calcicola is a species of orchid.
