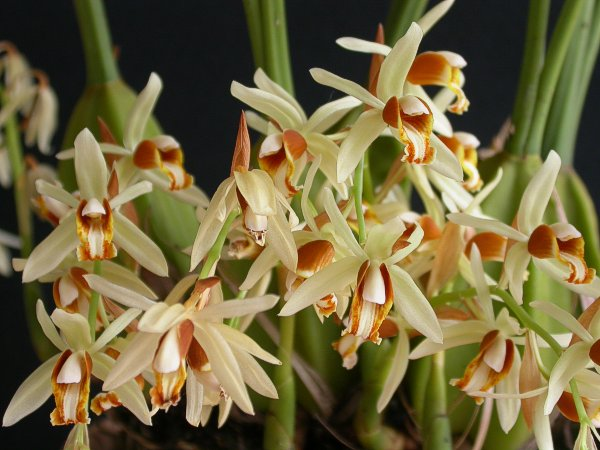

Scientific classification
- Kingdom: Plantae
- Clade: Tracheophytes
- Clade: Angiosperms
- Clade: Monocots
- Order: Asparagales
- Family: Orchidaceae
- Subfamily: Epidendroideae
- Tribe: Arethuseae
- Genus: Coelogyne
- Species: C. trinervis

Binomial name
- Coelogyne trinervis Lindl. (1830)

Synonyms
- Pleione trinervis (Lindl.) Kuntze (1891); Coelogyne cinnamomea Lindl. (1858); Coelogyne rhodeana Rchb.f. (1867); Coelogyne rossiana Rchb.f. (1884); Pleione rossiana (Rchb.f.) Kuntze (1891); Coelogyne angustifolia Ridl. (1897); Coelogyne pachybulbon Ridl. (1897); Coelogyne wettsteiniana Schltr. (1920); Coelogyne stenophylla Ridl. (1924)

= Coelogyne trinervis =

Species of orchid

Coelogyne trinervis is a species of orchid. It is native from Indo-China to west and central Malesia.

== Images ==
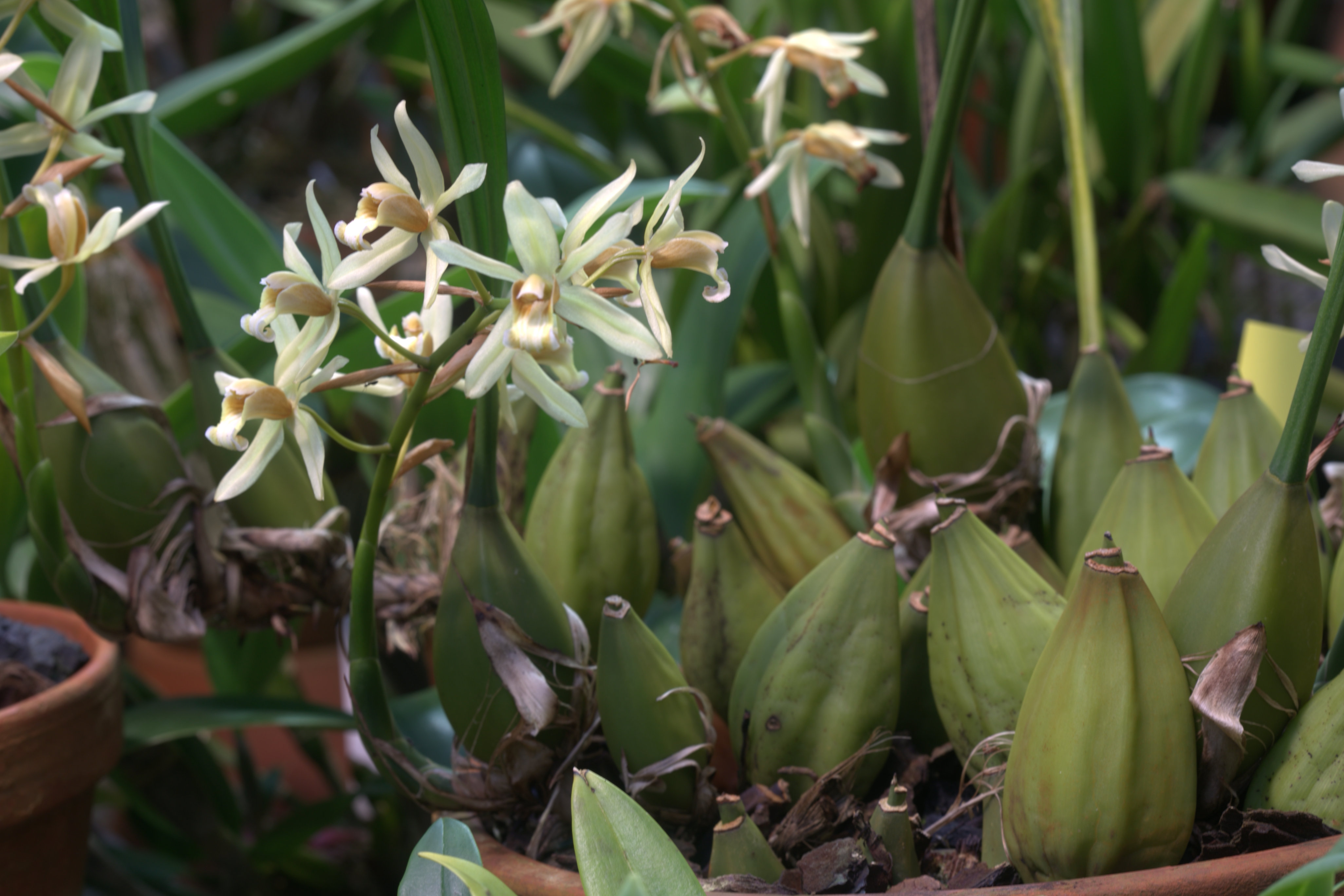

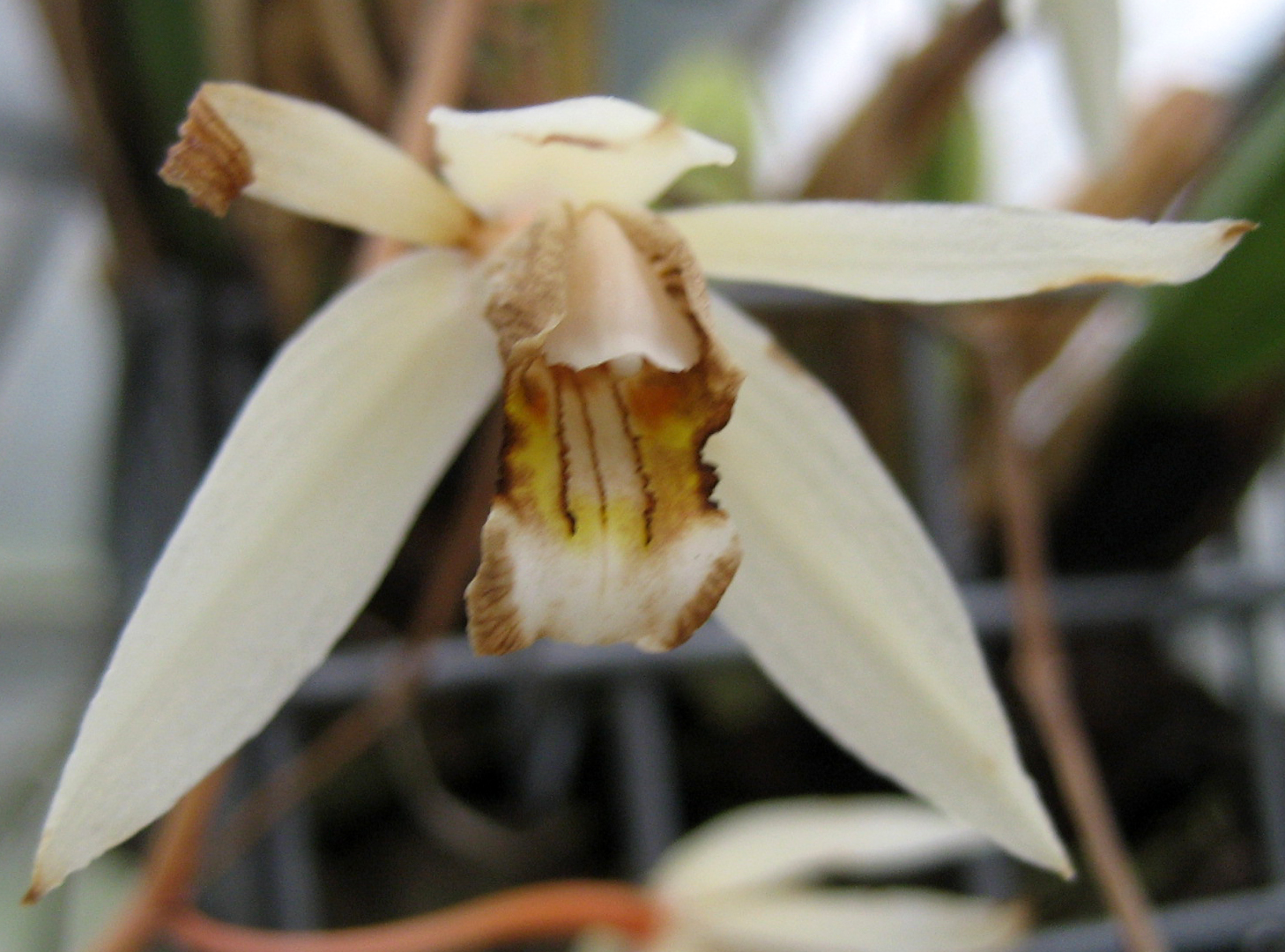
