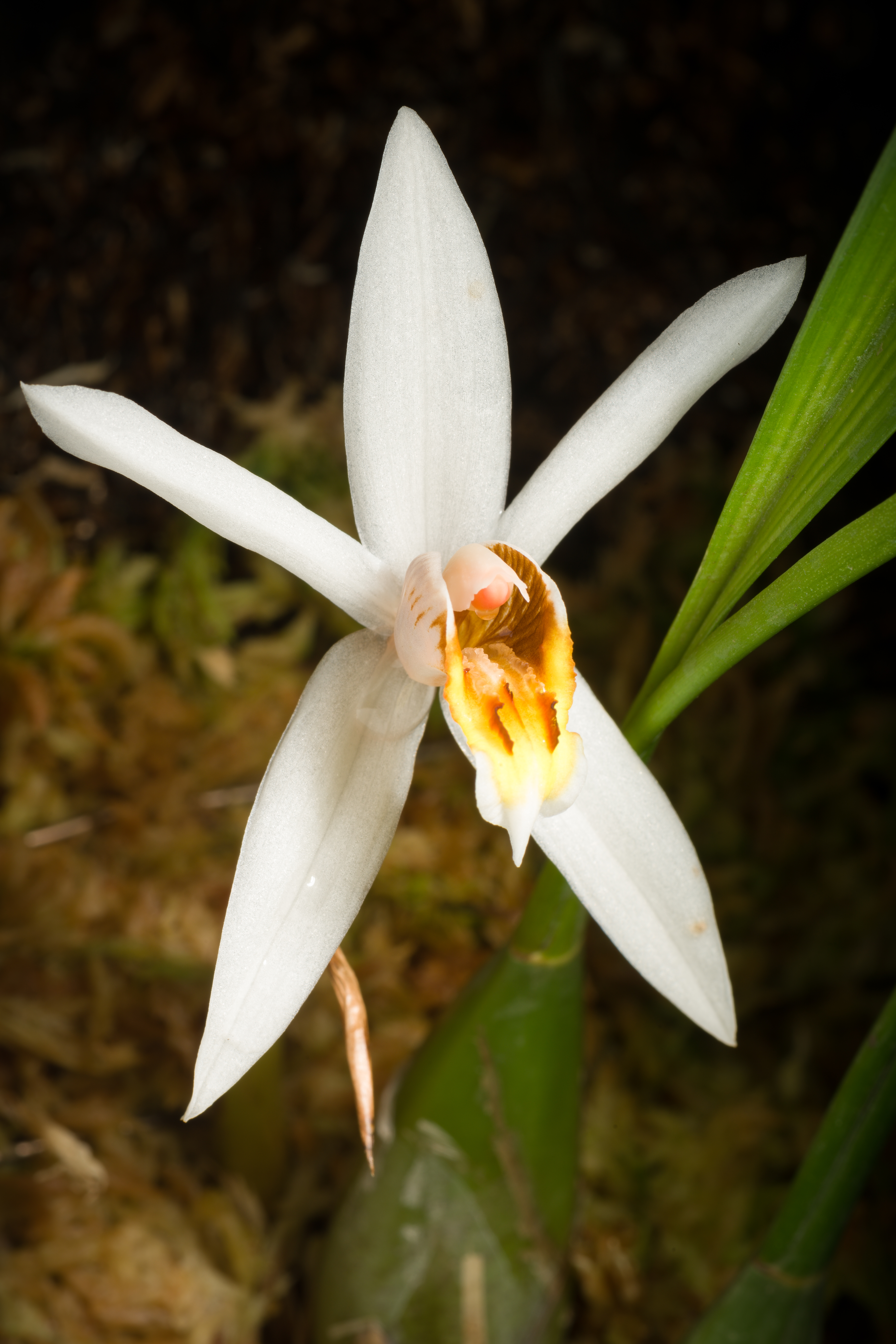

Scientific classification
- Kingdom: Plantae
- Clade: Tracheophytes
- Clade: Angiosperms
- Clade: Monocots
- Order: Asparagales
- Family: Orchidaceae
- Subfamily: Epidendroideae
- Tribe: Arethuseae
- Genus: Coelogyne
- Species: C. viscosa

Binomial name
- Coelogyne viscosa Rchb.f. (1856)

Synonyms
- Coelogyne graminifolia C.S.P. Parish & Rchb.f. (1874); Pleione viscosa (Rchb.f.) Kuntze (1891); Pleione graminifolia (C.S.P. Parish & Rchb.f.) Kuntze (1891)

= Coelogyne viscosa =

Species of orchid

Coelogyne viscosa is a species of orchid.

Media related to Coelogyne viscosa at Wikimedia Commons
