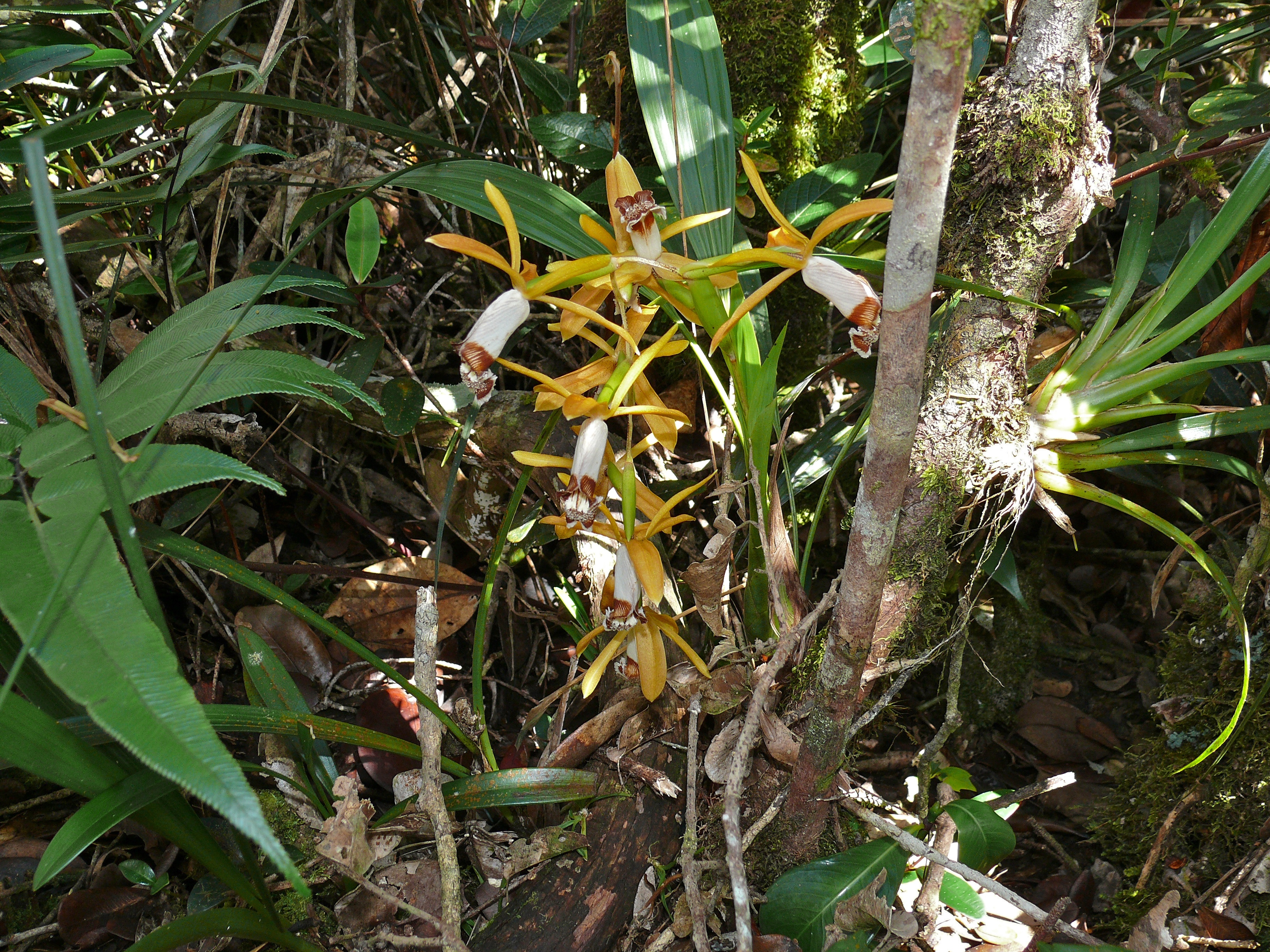

Scientific classification
- Kingdom: Plantae
- Clade: Tracheophytes
- Clade: Angiosperms
- Clade: Monocots
- Order: Asparagales
- Family: Orchidaceae
- Subfamily: Epidendroideae
- Tribe: Arethuseae
- Genus: Coelogyne
- Species: C. radioferens

Binomial name
- Coelogyne radioferens Ames & C.Schweinf. 1920

= Coelogyne radioferens =

Species of orchid

Coelogyne radioferens is an orchid endemic to Borneo. Among its genus, it stands out for its cinnamon-colored flowers.
