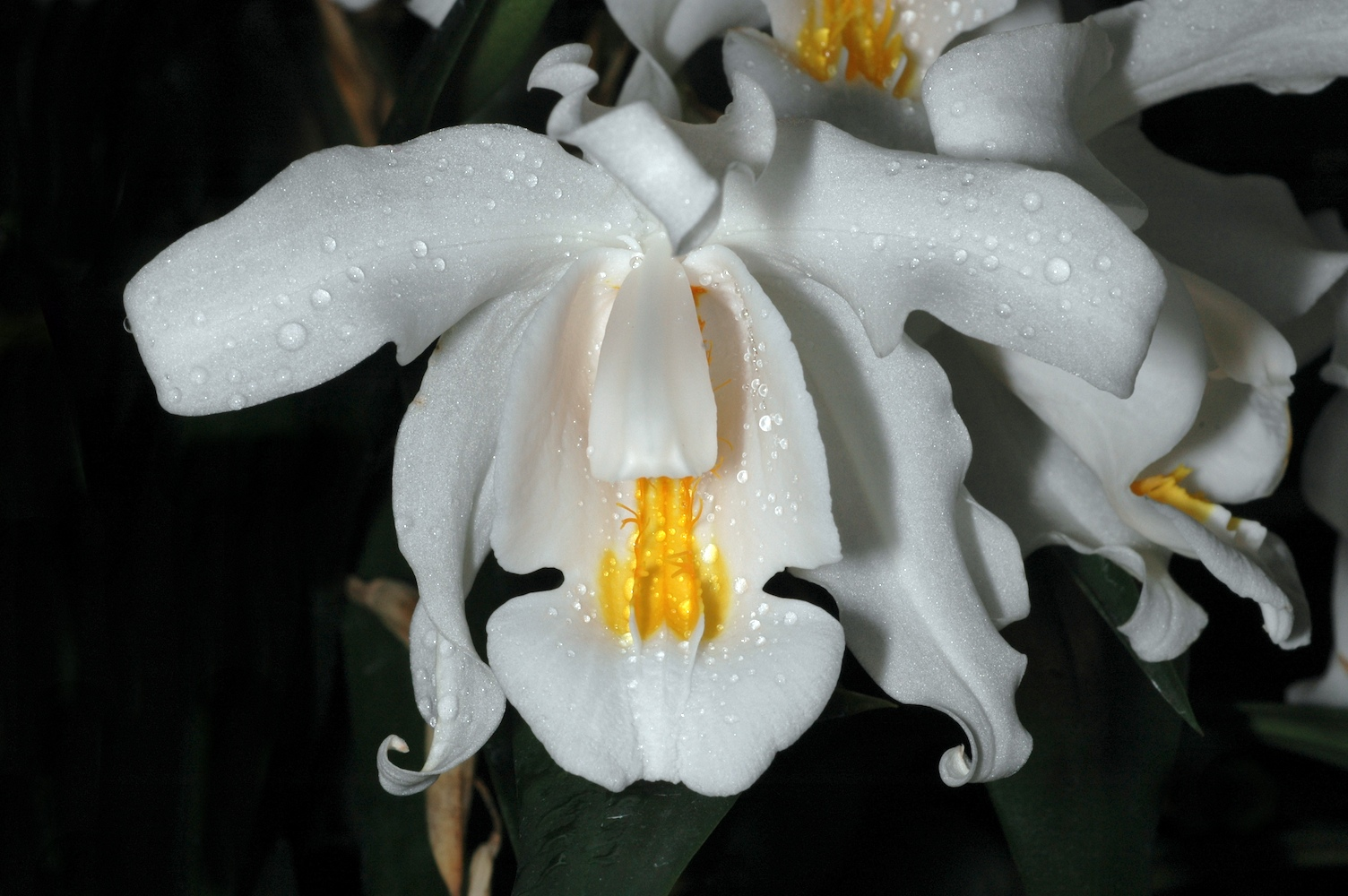
- Coelogyne cristata

Scientific classification
- Kingdom: Plantae
- Clade: Tracheophytes
- Clade: Angiosperms
- Clade: Monocots
- Order: Asparagales
- Family: Orchidaceae
- Subfamily: Epidendroideae
- Tribe: Arethuseae
- Subtribe: Coelogyninae
- Genus: Coelogyne; Lindl.

Type species
- Coelogyne cristata Lindl.

Species
- See List of Coelogyne species

Synonyms
- List: Acanthoglossum Blume; Acoridium Nees & Meyen; Androgyne Griff.; Basigyne J.J.Sm.; Bracisepalum J.J.Sm.; Broughtonia Wall. ex Lindl.; Bulleyia Schltr.; Camelostalix Pfitzer; Chelonanthera Blume; Chelonistele Pfitzer; Crinonia Blume; Dendrochilum Blume; Dickasonia L.O.Williams; Entomophobia de Vogel; Geesinkorchis de Vogel; Gynoglottis J.J.Sm.; Hologyne Pfitzer; Ischnogyne Schltr.; Kalimpongia Pradhan; Nabaluia Ames; Neogyna Rchb.f.; Otochilus Lindl.; Panisea (Lindl.) Lindl.; Pholidota Lindl.; Platyclinis Benth.; Pseudacoridium Ames; Ptilocnema D.Don; Ptychogyne Pfitzer; Sigmatochilus Rolfe; Sigmatogyne Pfitzer; Tetrapeltis Wall. ex Lindl.; Zetagyne Ridl.

= Coelogyne =

Genus of orchids

Coelogyne is a genus of about 600 species, of sympodial epiphytes from the family Orchidaceae, distributed across India, China, Indonesia and the Fiji islands, with the main centers in Borneo, Sumatra and the Himalayas. They can be found from tropical lowland forests to montane rainforests. A few species grow as terrestrials or even as lithophytes in open, humid habitats.

== Description ==
=== Vegetative characteristics ===
Coelogyne are mostly epithytic, sympodial, pseudobulbous, rhizomatous herbs with pendulous or creeping rhizomes and thin roots. The cylindrical to conical pseudobulbs bear stalked or sessile leaves at the apex.

=== Generative characteristics ===
This genus lacks the saccate base of the labellum, a typical characteristic which is present in the other genera in the subtribe Coelogyninae. The free lip has high lateral lobes along the basal part of the labellum (hypochile) and smooth, toothed or warty keels.

Inflorescences often show a small to very large number of showy, medium-sized to large flowers. They may arise either from the apex of the newly completed pseudobulb at the end of the growing season (as in Coelogyne fimbriata), or may precede the new growth in early spring (as in Coelogyne cristata). The typical colour range of this genus is white, through tawny brown to green, and occasionally peachy tones. All species have four pollinia.

They have often a sweet scent, attracting different kinds of pollinators, such as bees, wasps and beetles.

== Taxonomy ==
It was first published as Caelogyne Lindl. by Lindl. in 1821, but it was later changed to Coelogyne Lindl. in 1825. The lectotype species is Coelogyne cristata Lindl. It is the type genus of the subtribe Coelogyninae Benth.. The traditional taxonomy of the genus Coelogyne is still disputed. Coelogyne has been subdivided in 23 sections or subgenera by De Vogel (1994) and Clayton. Molecular data show that Coelogyne is paraphyletic and should be reorganised. It should include the genera Neogyna and Pholidota, and several sections should be removed, including Cyathogyne, Tomentosae, Rigidiformes, Veitchiae and Verrucosae. This new genus Coelogyne should then contain about 160 species.

=== Species ===
See List of Coelogyne species

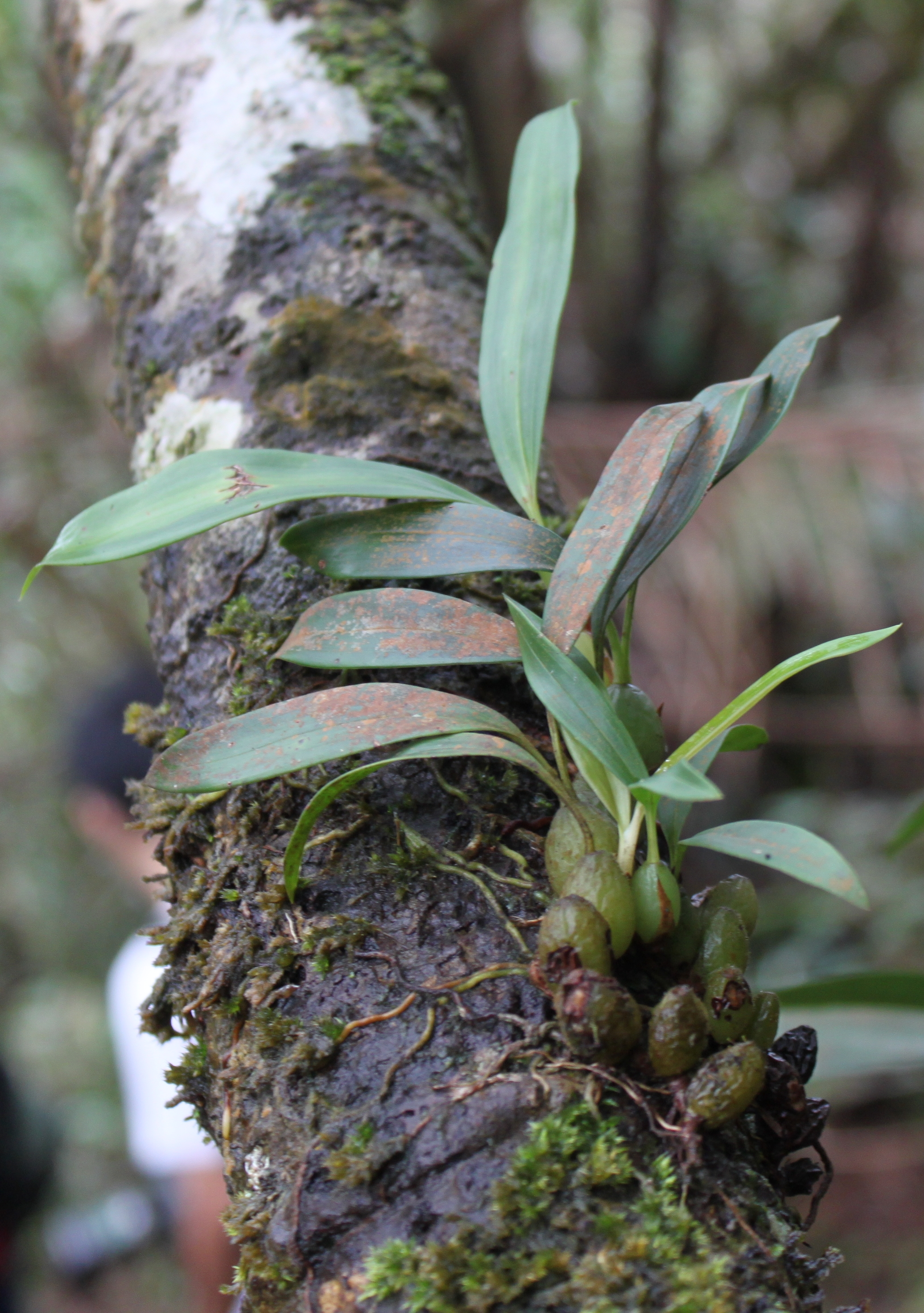
Coelogyne odoardoi

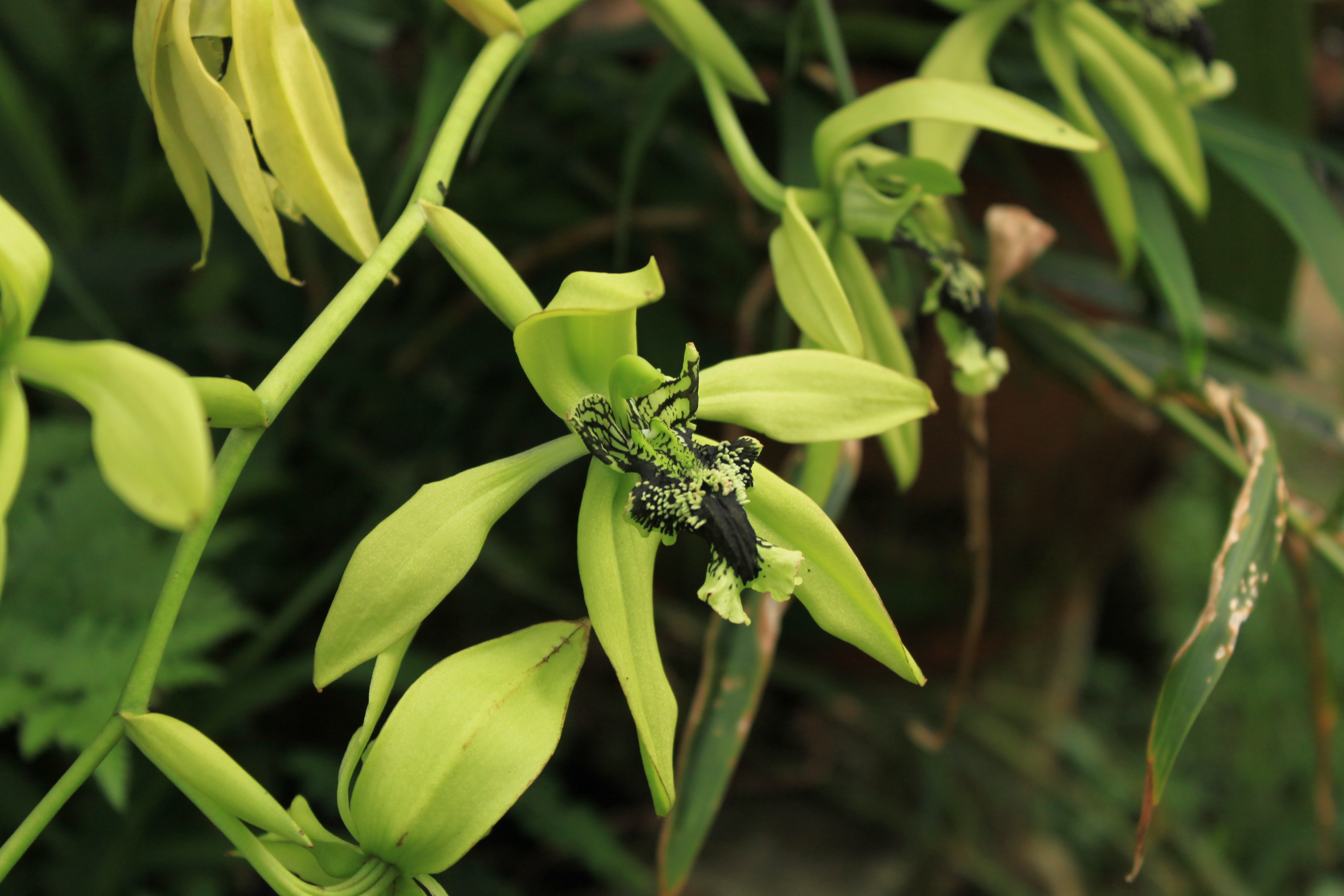
Coelogyne pandurata

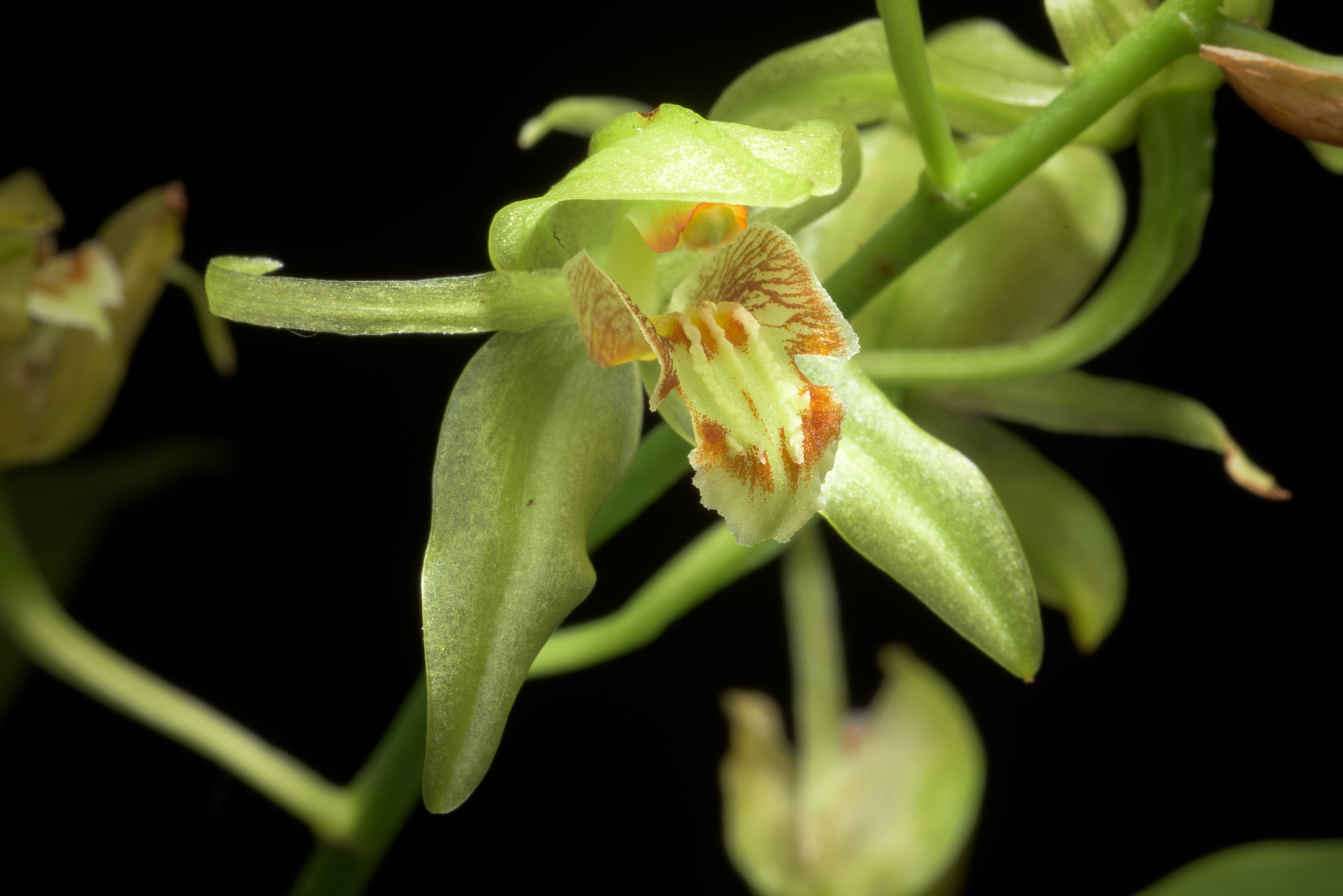
Coelogyne chlorophaea

== Etymology ==
The generic name Coelogyne is derived from the Greek koilos meaning hollow, and gyne, meaning pistil or woman. It refers to the concave stigma.

== Ecology ==
=== Habitat ===
Coelogyne grow as epiphytic, or rarely lithophytic or terrestrial plants in tropical rainforests at elevations of 0–3000 m above sea level.

=== Pollinations ===
The flowers are pollinated by beetles, wasps and bees.
