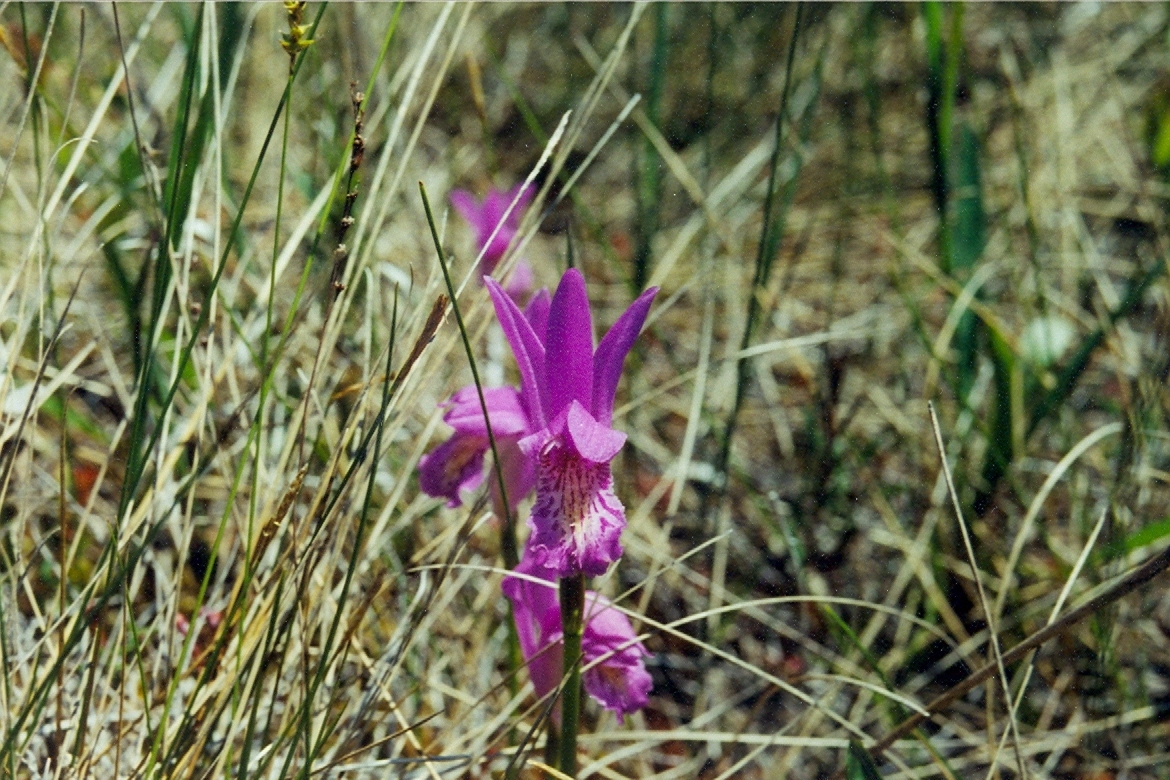
- Arethusa bulbosa

Scientific classification
- Kingdom: Plantae
- Clade: Tracheophytes
- Clade: Angiosperms
- Clade: Monocots
- Order: Asparagales
- Family: Orchidaceae
- Subfamily: Epidendroideae
- Tribe: Arethuseae
- Subtribe: Arethusinae; Benth. & Hook.f., Genera Plantarum 3: 463, 484. (1883)

Type genus
- Arethusa

Genera
- Anthogonium; Arethusa; Arundina; Calopogon; Eleorchis; Mengzia

= Arethusinae =

Subtribe of orchids

Arethusinae is an orchid subtribe in the tribe Arethuseae.

== Taxonomy ==
Phylogenetic relationships of Arethusinae genera
- Arethusinae
  - - - - - - Arethusa L.
            - Eleorchis F.Maek.
          - Calopogon R.Br.
        - Mengzia W.C.Huang, Z.J.Liu & C.Hu
      - - Anthogonium Wall. ex Lindl.
  - - Arundina Blume

=== Genera ===
Image	Genus	Species
	Anthogonium Wall. ex Lindl.	Anthogonium gracile Wall. ex Lindl. (1836)
	Arethusa L.	Arethusa bulbosa L.
	Arundina Blume	Arundina graminifolia (D.Don) Hochr.
	Calopogon R.Br.	Calopogon barbatus (Walter) Ames – from Louisiana to North Carolina; Calopogon multiflorus Lindl. – from Louisiana to North Carolina; Calopogon oklahomensis D.H.Goldman – Mississippi Valley, west to Texas and Oklahoma, east to Georgia; Calopogon pallidus Chapm. – from Louisiana to Virginia; Calopogon tuberosus (L.) Britton; Calopogon tuberosus var. simpsonii (Small) Magrath – southern Florida; Calopogon tuberosus var. tuberosus – from Texas to Florida, north to Manitoba and Nova Scotia, also Cuba and Bahamas
	Eleorchis F.Maek.	Eleorchis japonica (A.Gray) Maek.
	Mengzia W.C.Huang, Z.J.Liu & C.Hu	Mengzia foliosa (King & Pantl.) W.C.Huang, Z.J.Liu & C.Hu

== See also ==
- Taxonomy of the Orchidaceae
