= × Elearethusa =

Scientific classification
- Kingdom: Plantae
- Clade: Tracheophytes
- Clade: Angiosperms
- Clade: Monocots
- Order: Asparagales
- Family: Orchidaceae
- Subfamily: Epidendroideae
- Tribe: Arethuseae
- Subtribe: Arethusinae
- Genus: × Elearethusa hort.

Species of orchid

× Elearethusa is an intergeneric hybrid of orchids (family Orchidaceae). Its parents' genera are Arethusa and Eleorchis. It is abbreviated Elsa in trade journals.
