= ELP =

ELP or Elp may refer to:

== Music ==
- Emerson, Lake & Palmer, UK rock group
  - Emerson, Lake & Powell, UK rock group, successor of the above
- El-P (born 1975), US hip-hop artist

== Transport ==
- El Paso International Airport, in Texas
- Ellesmere Port railway station, in England
- London Buses route ELP
- Union Depot (El Paso), in Texas

== Science ==
- Elp culture, of the Bronze Age Netherlands
- Elastin-like polypeptides
- Elpaputih language
- × Elepogon, an intergeneric hybrid of orchids
- Ephemeride Lunaire Parisienne, a lunar theory

== Other uses ==
- Elp, a town in the Netherlands
- ELP Communications, an American television production company later merged into Columbia TriStar Television
- ELP Japan, an audio turntable manufacturer
- Endangered Languages Project
- Environmental Literacy Plan
- El Phantasmo
- Sahrawi People's Liberation Army

== See also ==
- ELPT
- Elpe (disambiguation)
