= × Elepogon =

Scientific classification
- Kingdom: Plantae
- Clade: Embryophytes
- Clade: Tracheophytes
- Clade: Spermatophytes
- Clade: Angiosperms
- Clade: Monocots
- Order: Asparagales
- Family: Orchidaceae
- Subfamily: Epidendroideae
- Tribe: Arethuseae
- Subtribe: Arethusinae
- Genus: × Elepogon hort.

Genus of orchids

× Elepogon, abbreviated Elp, is an intergeneric hybrid of orchids (family Orchidaceae) between the genera Calopogon and Eleorchis The hybrid genus × Elepogon was first registered and established by an orchid breeder named R. Yannetti in 1993.
