= Elpe (disambiguation) =

Elpe is a river in Germany.

Elpe or ELPE may also refer to:

- Elpe (Olsberg), a village in Olsberg, Germany
- ELPE, the stock symbol of the Greek company Hellenic Petroleum

== See also ==
- Elp, a village in Drenthe, Netherlands
- ELP (disambiguation)
