= Grass pink =

Grass pink is a common name for several flowering plant taxa:

- Calopogon, a genus of the Orchidaceae
- A species of pink, Dianthus plumarius, of the Caryophyllaceae
