= Louisiana Native Plant Nurseries =

Nursery growing native plants of Louisiana

Native plants of Louisiana and greenhouse

A Louisiana native plant nursery is a plant nursery that only grows native plants indigenous to Louisiana. Native plant nurseries primarily produce and propagate native plants with the intention to restore and replenish the diversity of native flora. In Louisiana, these nurseries are a source of plants used for wetland and coastal restoration projects. Nurseries provide a controlled environment that is ideal for plant research for ecosystem restoration. The resulting information from plant research can be used to develop better strains of specific species. Cloning these strains of plants insures the quota for a restoration project is successfully met.

== Background ==
Generally, a plant nursery is a facility that produces and propagates a variety of plants for various purposes. Commonly, plant nurseries grow non-native plants and native plants for urban landscapes.

Louisiana native plant nurseries not only provide plants for restoration projects but also provide plants for the home garden. A garden that consists of native plants is much easier to maintain. Native plants in their native environment require little to no additional nutrients, water, or pesticides. Native plants have evolved over time with their environment (e.g., soil) using the resources that are naturally available. Louisiana may not be able to provide the necessary amount of water or nutrients for a non-native plant, which in turn will need additional resources, maintenance, and attention in order to properly grow.

Unfortunately, native plants, a vital part of the natural web of life, are being lost at an alarming rate. There are real and practical pay-offs to encouraging a more biologically diverse yard. Healthy, balanced ecosystems clean our water and our air. Native plant nurseries encourage gardeners to use native plants to promote local biodiversity. The Louisiana Native Plant Society is a good source to find a retail nursery nearest to you or for more general information about native plants of Louisiana.

== Conservation concerns ==
Louisiana's 3 million acres of wetlands are lost at the rate about 75 square kilometers annually, but reducing these losses is proving to be difficult and costly. In an attempt to slow the rate of loss and perhaps halt the overall trend, resource managers in Louisiana apply various techniques to restore damaged or degraded habitats to functioning wetland systems. Greenhouse studies at native plant nurseries that address effective restoration strategies for coastal wetlands have identified differences in growth that naturally exist in native Louisiana wetland plant species and genetic varieties (i.e., clones) within species. These studies will provide information that will assist resource managers in selecting plant species and clones of species that can be matched to environmental conditions at potential restoration sites.

== Natural Resource Conservation Service: Plant Materials Program ==
=== Plant Materials Program ===
The program aims to develop and deliver plant science technology to meet the nation's natural resource conservation needs. The mission of the Plant Materials Program has been to find plant solutions to solve conservation problems. Plant Materials Centers (PMCs) around the nation have developed over 600 conservation plant releases of grasses, legumes, forbs, shrubs, and trees. Finding these uniquely evolved plants to meet specific conservation needs has been, and continues to be, the focus of the Plant Materials Program. These plants literally provide protection for millions of acres cross our nation.

=== Golden Meadows Plant Materials Center ===
LAPMC service area and aerial view of facility

The Golden Meadows Plant Materials Center in Galliano, Louisiana (LAPMC) was established in 1989 by the Natural Resource Conservation Service(NRCS). LAPMC develops plants and procedures to reverse the loss of coastal wetlands. The facility services coastal wetlands of Louisiana, Mississippi, and Texas. The eight species of plants that were developed by the center are used for coastal wetland remediation, restoration, and enhancement. These plants have proven effective in converting open water to new marsh. The eight species of plants are: ‘Pelican germplasm’ black mangrove ( Avicennia germinans), ‘Caminada germplasm’ sea oats (Uniola paniculata), ‘Vermillion’ smooth cordgrass (Spartina alterniflora), ‘Gulf coast’ marshhay cordgrass (Spartina patens), ‘Brazoria germplasm’ seashore paspalum (Paspalum vaginatum), ‘Boyou Lafourche germplasm’ California bulrush (Schoenoplectus californicus), ‘Timbalier germplasm’ gulf bluestem (Schizachyrium maritimum), ‘Fourchon germplasm’ bitter panicum (Panicum amarum). LAPMC works continuously to reach its three goals. First, identify and evaluate species for coastal erosion control, marsh restoration and dune stabilization. Second, provide plants and technology to assist commercial growers in addressing coastal resource concerns. Third, provide educational opportunities and access to all segments of the community to the Golden Meadow Plant Materials Center Program.
