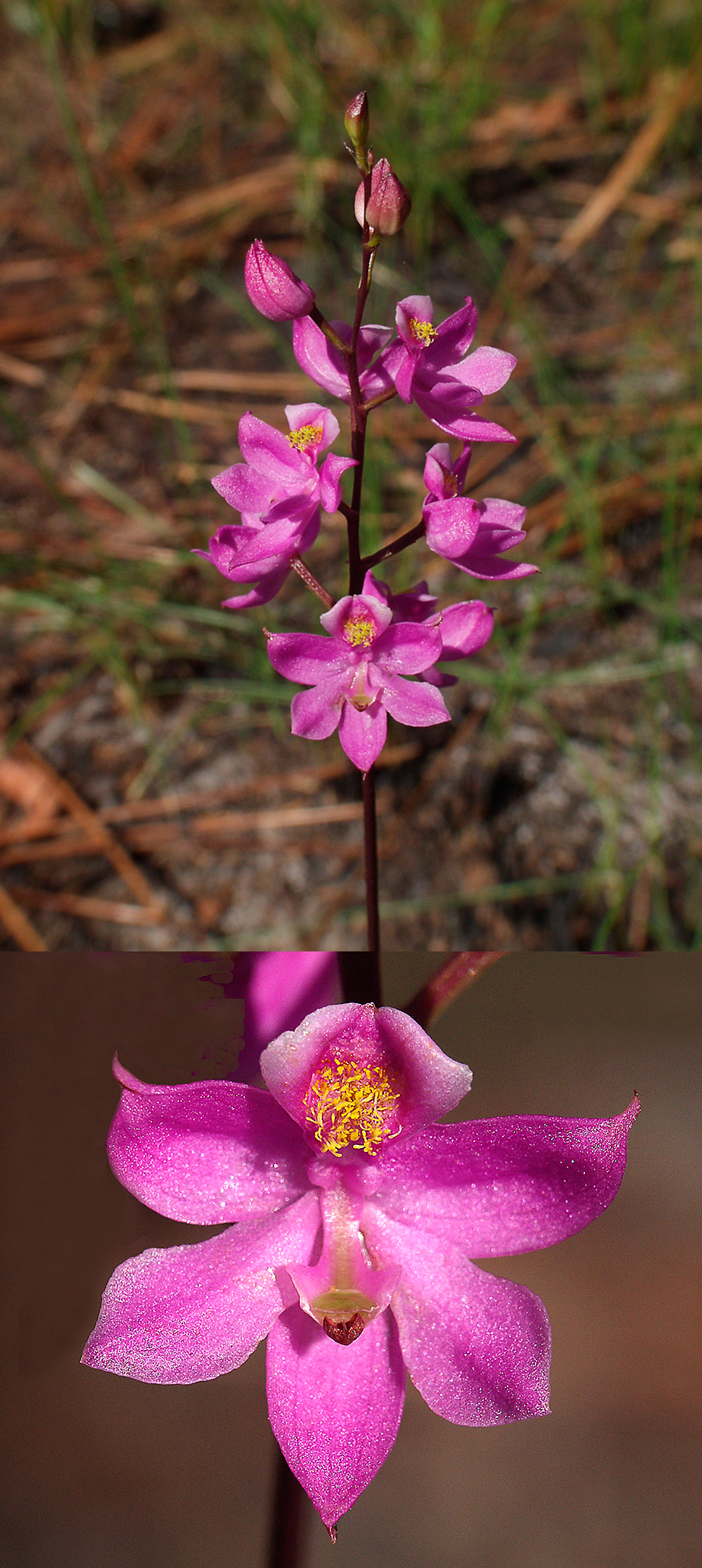
- Calopogon multiflorus flowers

Conservation status
- Least Concern (IUCN 3.1)

- Imperiled (NatureServe)

Scientific classification
- Kingdom: Plantae
- Clade: Tracheophytes
- Clade: Angiosperms
- Clade: Monocots
- Order: Asparagales
- Family: Orchidaceae
- Subfamily: Epidendroideae
- Tribe: Arethuseae
- Genus: Calopogon
- Species: C. multiflorus

Binomial name
- Calopogon multiflorus Lindl.
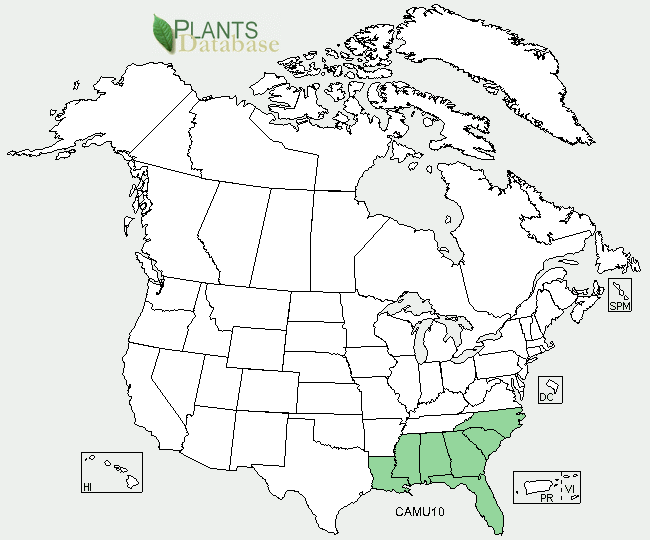

Synonyms
- Helleborine multiflora (Lindl.) Kuntze; Limodorum multiflorum (Lindl.) Mohr; Limodorum pinetorum Small; Calopogon barbatus var. multiflorus (Lindl.) Correll; Calopogon multiflorus f. albiflorus P.M.Br.

= Calopogon multiflorus =

Species of orchid

Calopogon multiflorus, the many-flowered grass-pink, is a species of orchid. It is a perennial forb that requires recurring ground fires to maintain its habitat. It falls under the genus Calopogon, meaning "beautiful beard" in Greek, referring to the stamen-like bristles or beard on the lip.

== Distribution ==
Calopogon multiflorus is distributed throughout southeastern United States. It can be found mainly in Florida and also Alabama, Georgia, Mississippi, Louisiana, North Carolina, and South Carolina. This species has become imperiled or critically imperiled throughout its range and is possibly extirpated from Georgia according to NatureServe.

== Habitat and ecology ==
Calopogon multiflorus can be found in dry to moist flatwoods with wiregrass, longleaf pine, and saw palmetto. Its habitat also includes mesic pine savannahs on flat or gently-sloping terrain. These longleaf pine savannas were once widespread in southeastern North America, and they burned naturally at least once a decade (see map in fire ecology). Large areas of suitable habitat have since been lost from logging and fire suppression.

The soil it grows in is usually sandy to loamy and acidic. Other species that are found growing nearby in the same habitat are blackjack oak (Quercus marilandica), little gallberry/ink berry (Ilex glabra), slender bluestem (Schizachyrium tenerum), little bluestem (S. scoparium), and savannah meadow beauty (Rhexia alifanus). Over a wide range, this species typically does not occur on wet savannahs and bogs with pitcher plants, although one location in Louisiana does have some plants coexisting with pitcher plants.

C. multiflorus requires prescribed annual winter fires for its appearance. In this way it is typical of many of the understory plants in pine savannas. It is known to bloom six to eight weeks after a burn, likely benefiting from the lack of competition with other plants, and the nutrients released during a fire.

== Morphology ==
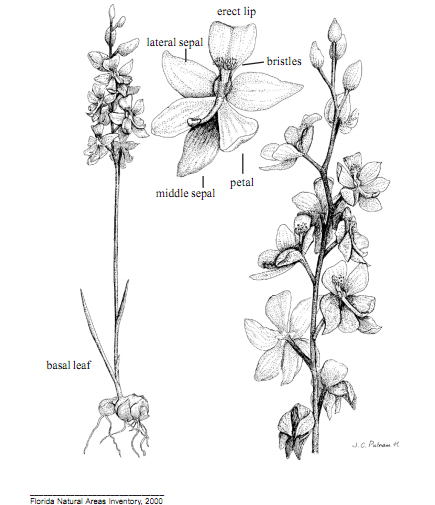
Morphology of Calopogon multiflorus

Characteristics of C. multiflorus are a dark purple rachis, a forked corm; pandurate lateral petals; elongated, acuminate floral bracts measuring (0.3–0.8)×(0.3–0.5) cm; and a pungent floral fragrance at peak anthesis.

After sprouting in early spring, a single leaf, or sometimes two, appear clasping the bloom stem. The number of flowers can range from fifteen to just one flower on a stem. When the flower buds mature, they open in quick succession. Sometimes, it takes only two days for all of the flowers to open. They remain open for a couple days before withering and dropping to the ground. The flowering season for C. multiflorus ranges from March to May. The average flowering season in Louisiana is mid-April. This species requires full sun to light shade to grow ideally.

== Pollination ==
This species falsely lures bees with the promise of pollen, but it is not fulfilled. The beard of the flower is deceptive in that once the insect lands on it, the lip of the beard swings down, hinge-like, placing the insect's head and back on the column thereby picking up pollinium load, or placing the pollinium on the stigma if the insect already carries a load on its back.

== Conservation ==
Although this orchid is known historically in Florida and other managed areas, it is now rare due to fire suppression and conversion of habitat to pine plantations. One way to protect this species is to burn flatwoods every two to three years during the growing season. These flatwoods can also be protected from bedding, draining, clearcutting, roller-chopping and other soil and hydrology disturbances.
