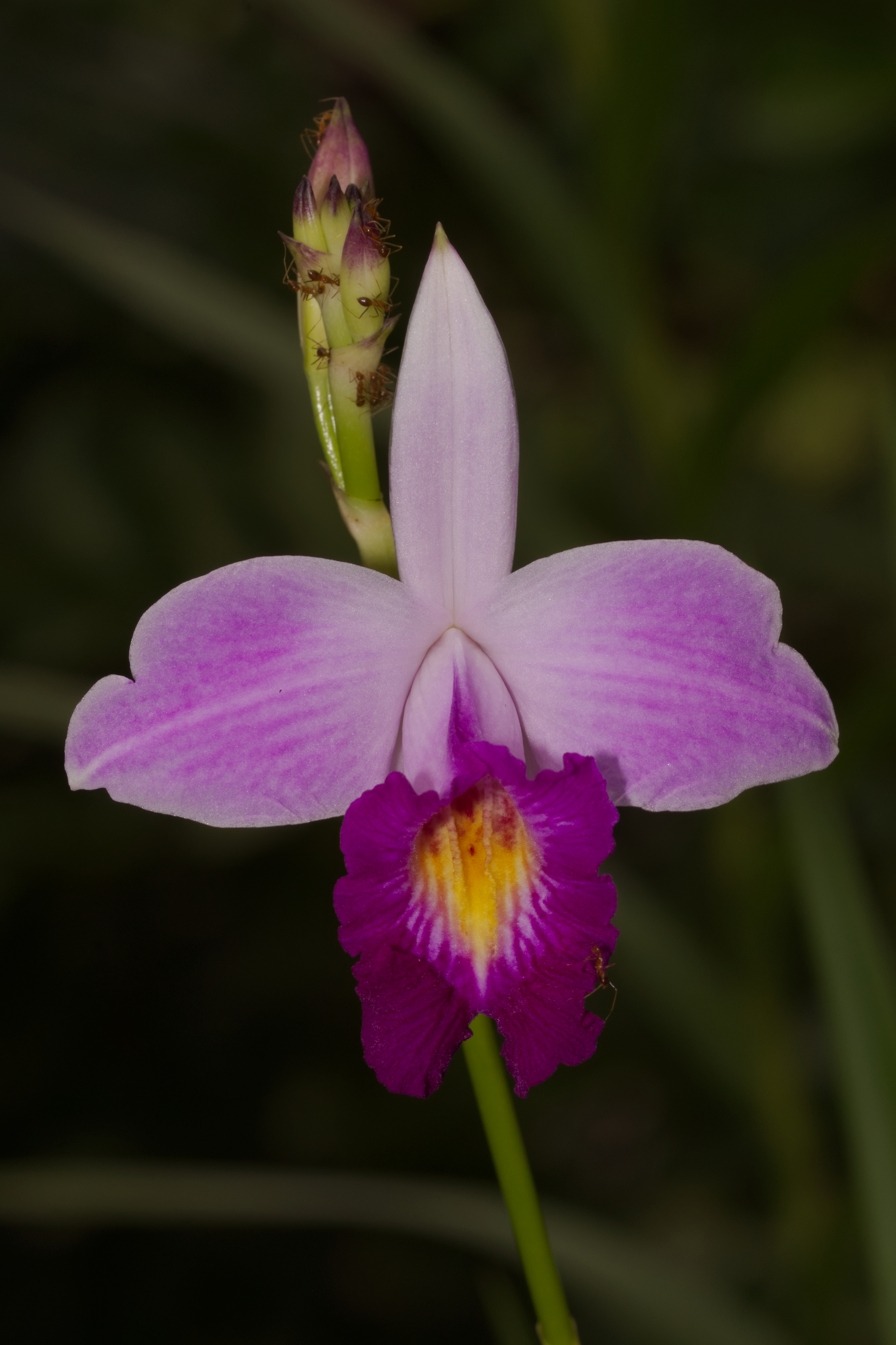
- Arundina graminifolia in Kerala

Scientific classification
- Kingdom: Plantae
- Clade: Tracheophytes
- Clade: Angiosperms
- Clade: Monocots
- Order: Asparagales
- Family: Orchidaceae
- Subfamily: Epidendroideae
- Tribe: Arethuseae
- Subtribe: Arethusinae
- Genus: Arundina; Rich.
- Species: A. graminifolia

Binomial name
- Arundina graminifolia (D.Don) Hochr.

Synonyms
- Bletia graminifolia D.Don; Arundina bambusifolia Lindl.; Cymbidium bambusifolium Roxb.; Arundina chinensis Blume; Arundina speciosa Blume (type species); Arundina densa Lindl.; Cymbidium meyenii Schauer; Arundina meyenii (Schauer) Rchb.f.; Arundina philippii Rchb.f.; Arundina pulchella Teijsm. & Binn.; Cymbidium speciosum Reinw. ex Lindl.; Arundina pulchra Miq.; Arundina densiflora Hook.f.; Limodorum graminifolium Buch.-Ham. ex Hook.f.; Arundina sanderiana Kraenzl.; Arundina speciosa var. sarasinorum Schltr.; Arundina maculata J.J.Sm.; Arundina chinensis var. major S.Y.Hu; Arundina graminifolia var. chinensis (Blume) S.S.Ying

= Arundina =

Genus of orchids

Arundina graminifolia, also called bamboo orchid, is a species of orchid and the first sole accepted species of the genus Arundina, followed by A. caespitosa discovered in 2007. This tropical Asiatic genus extends from Myanmar, India, Sri Lanka, Nepal, Thailand, Vietnam, the Ryukyu Islands, Malaysia, Singapore, China to Indonesia, the Philippines and New Guinea. It has become naturalized in Réunion, Fiji, French Polynesia, Micronesia, the West Indies, Costa Rica, Panama, Belize, and Hawaii. There are medicinal benefits to utilizing components of Arundina graminifolia, including soothing, anti-inflammatory, anti-bacterial and anti-pain properties; frequently used in Chinese medicine.

== Description ==
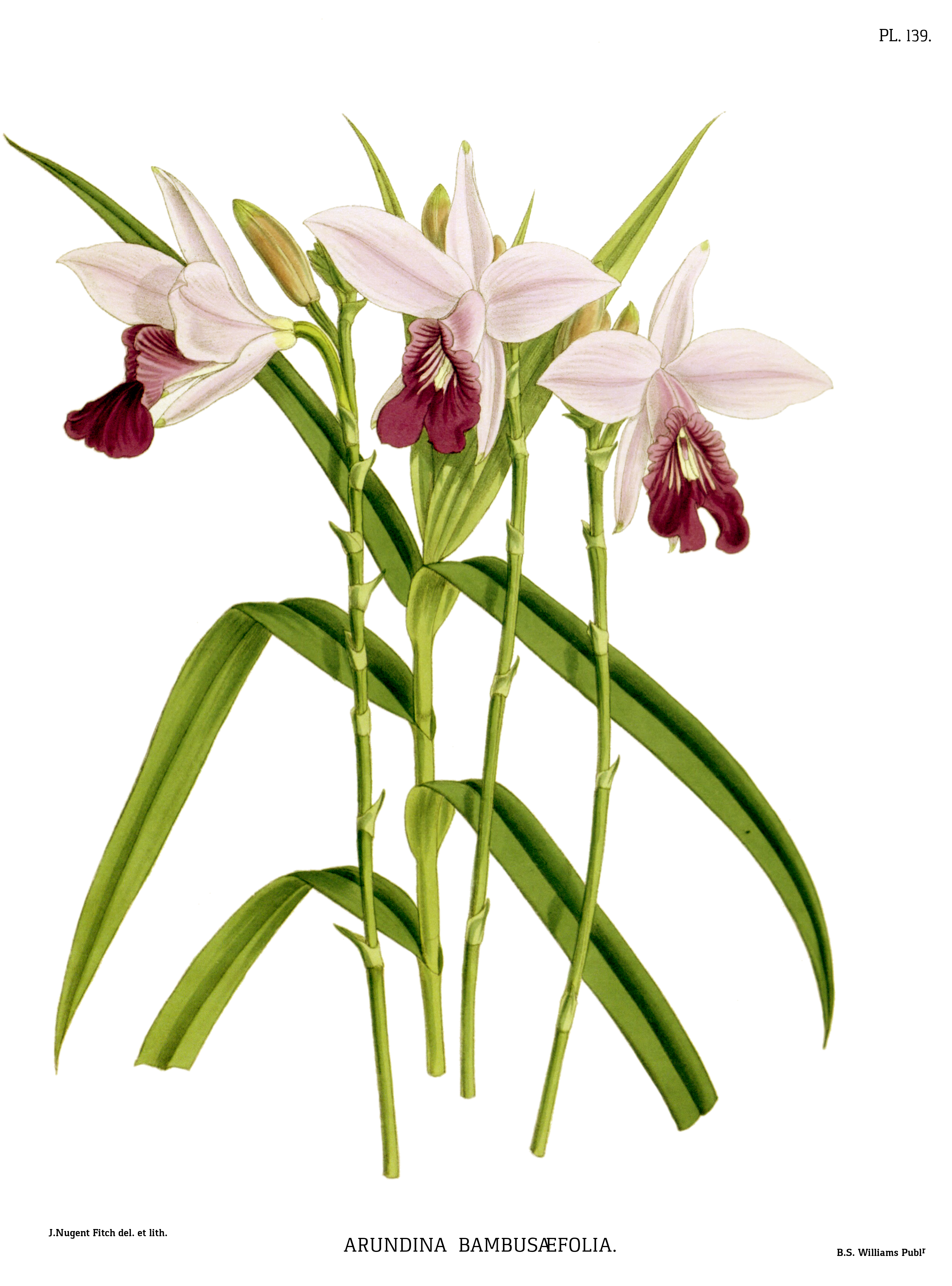
botanical illustration from 1883

Arundina graminifolia is a terrestrial, perennial orchid with reedy stems, forming into large clumps growing to a height between 70 cm and 2 m.

The plaited linear leaves are oblong lanceolate, with a length of 9 to 19 cm and a width of 0.8 to 1.5 cm. The apex is acuminate. There are amplexicaul (clasping the stem) sheathing stipules.

This orchid blooms in summer and autumn, showing rather open clusters of showy terminal flowers, ten at the most. They bloom in succession on the terminal racemes. These flowers, 5 to 7 cm in diameter, are a rosy lilac and white disc with a purple lip. The bracts are broadly triangular and surround the main stalk of the flower cluster. The occasional fertilized seed pods contain minute powdery seeds, and small plants often develop near the cane ends after flowering, which likely aid in propagation if allowed to reach the soil. A. graminifolia is pollinator dependent, and requires pollination to produce capsules.

At one point in time, only 200 of the plants were recorded growing naturally in Singapore, rendering the species close to extinction. This was due to the destruction of its natural habitat, namely the rainforests and mangrove forests. However, through replanting efforts by NParks, the species is now listed as a "common" cultivated plant. In Malaysia A. graminifolia is commonly called tapah and can be found in secondary forests or at forest fringes. It is very common in road cuts and other disturbed areas in full sun in Sarawak, where it is often the most common flowering plant seen along the roadsides.

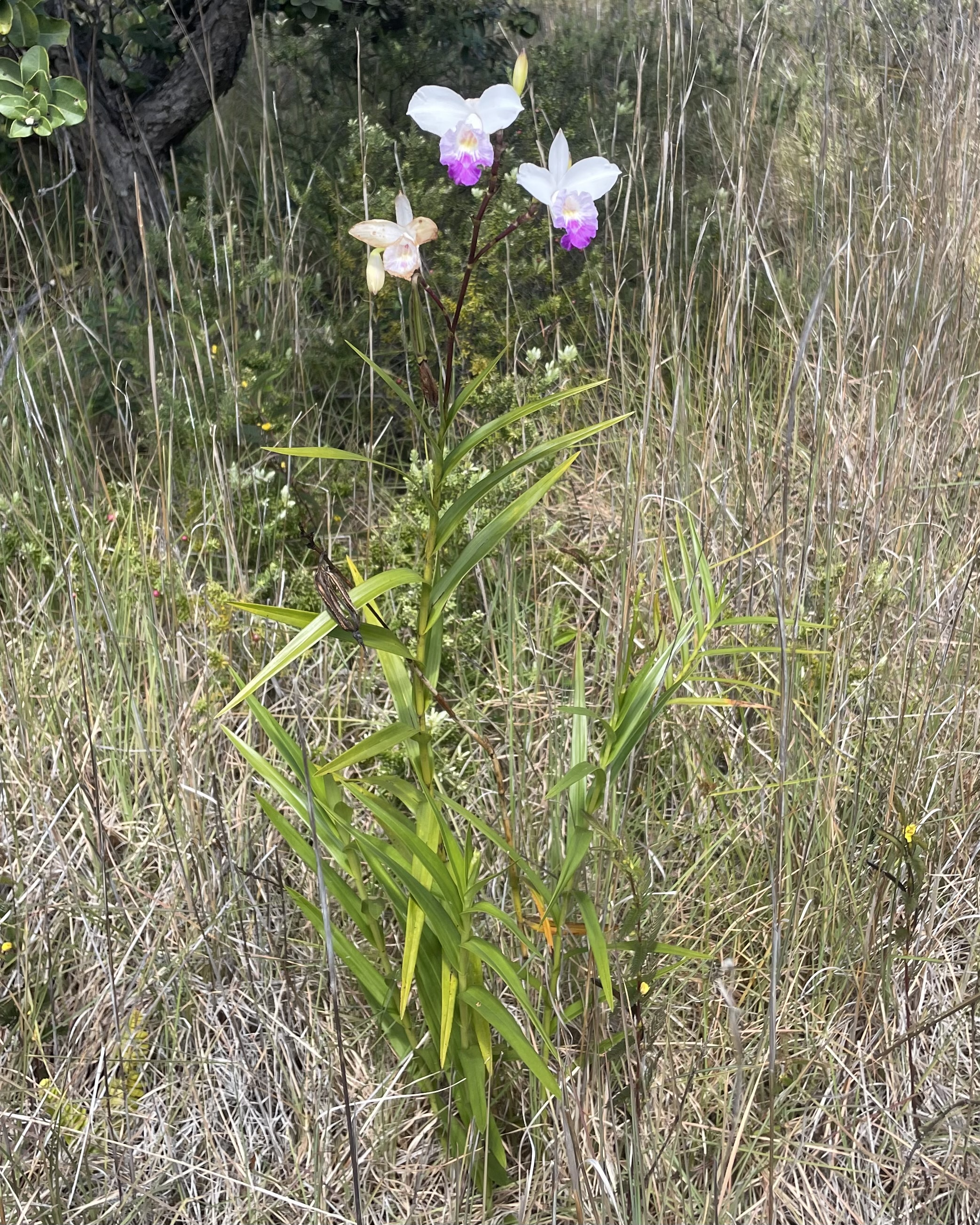
Arundina gramnifolia in Hawai'i

A. graminifolia follows patterns of invasive activity in tropical areas in Hawaii, Mauritiues, and Puerto Rico.

== Varieties ==
Two varieties are currently recognized (May 2014):

- Arundina graminifolia var. graminifolia
- Arundina graminifolia var. revoluta (Hook.f.) A.L.Lamb in C.L.Chan. & al. – from Assam and Sri Lanka east to Vietnam and south to Java
