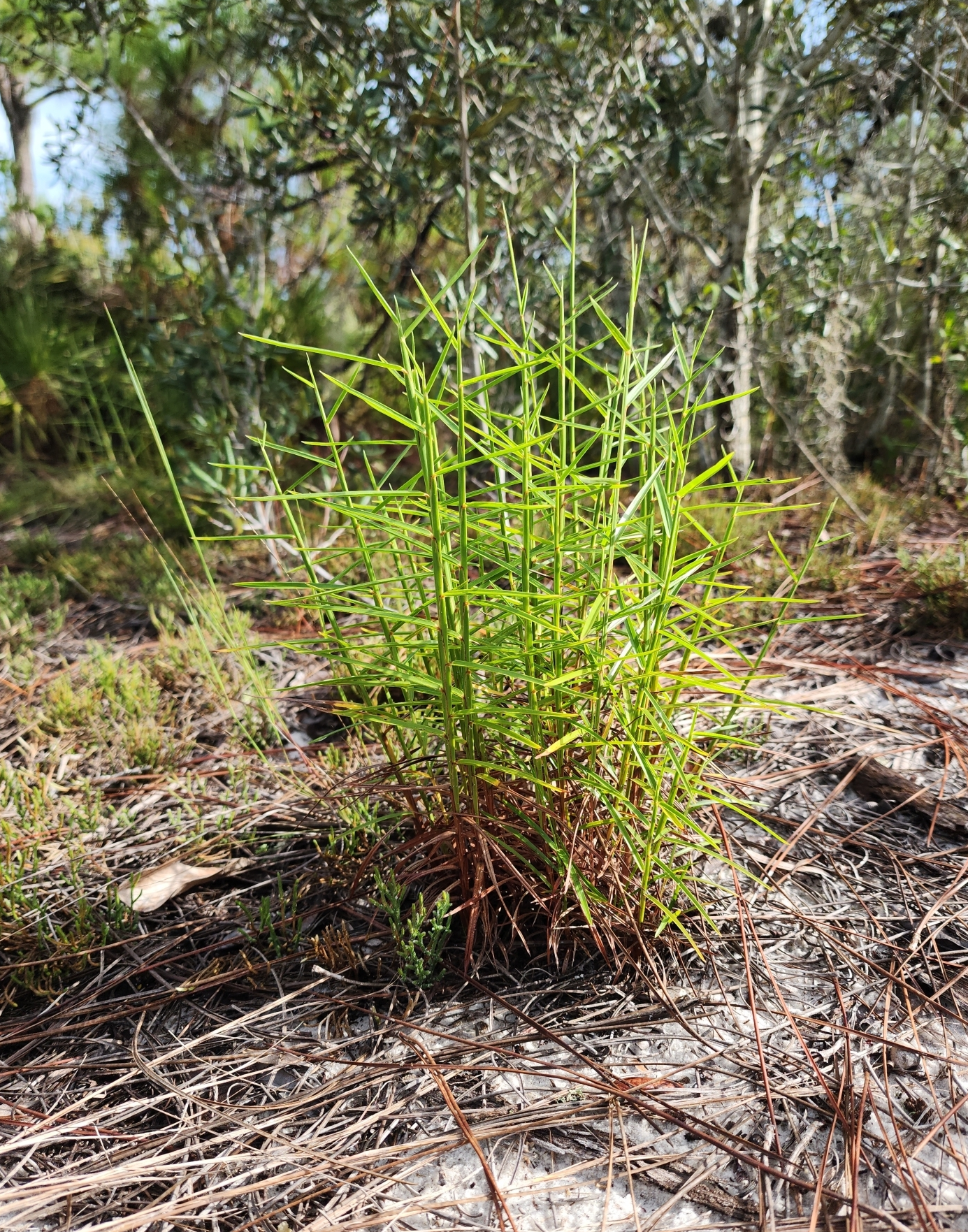
- White sand growth form

Conservation status
- Critically Imperiled (NatureServe)

Scientific classification
- Kingdom: Plantae
- Clade: Tracheophytes
- Clade: Angiosperms
- Clade: Monocots
- Clade: Commelinids
- Order: Poales
- Family: Poaceae
- Subfamily: Panicoideae
- Genus: Schizachyrium
- Species: S. niveum

Binomial name
- Schizachyrium niveum (Swallen) Gould

= Schizachyrium niveum =

Species of grass

Schizachyrium niveum, commonly referred to as pinescrub bluestem, is a rare species of grass endemic to peninsular Florida.

== Habitat ==
It only occurs in sunny openings in the sandy, fire-dependent habitats of scrub and scrubby sandhill. It is primarily found on the Lake Wales Ridge, especially in Polk and Highlands counties, but may also be found in Hillsborough, Hernando, Orange, Osceola, and Indian River counties.

== Conservation ==
It is known from likely less than 55 sites, many of which seem to have low populations. It faces threats from habitat loss and fragmentation due to development for real estate and agriculture. Additional threats include fire suppression, so prescribed fire or mulching are necessary parts of managing for the recovery of this species.

== Gallery ==
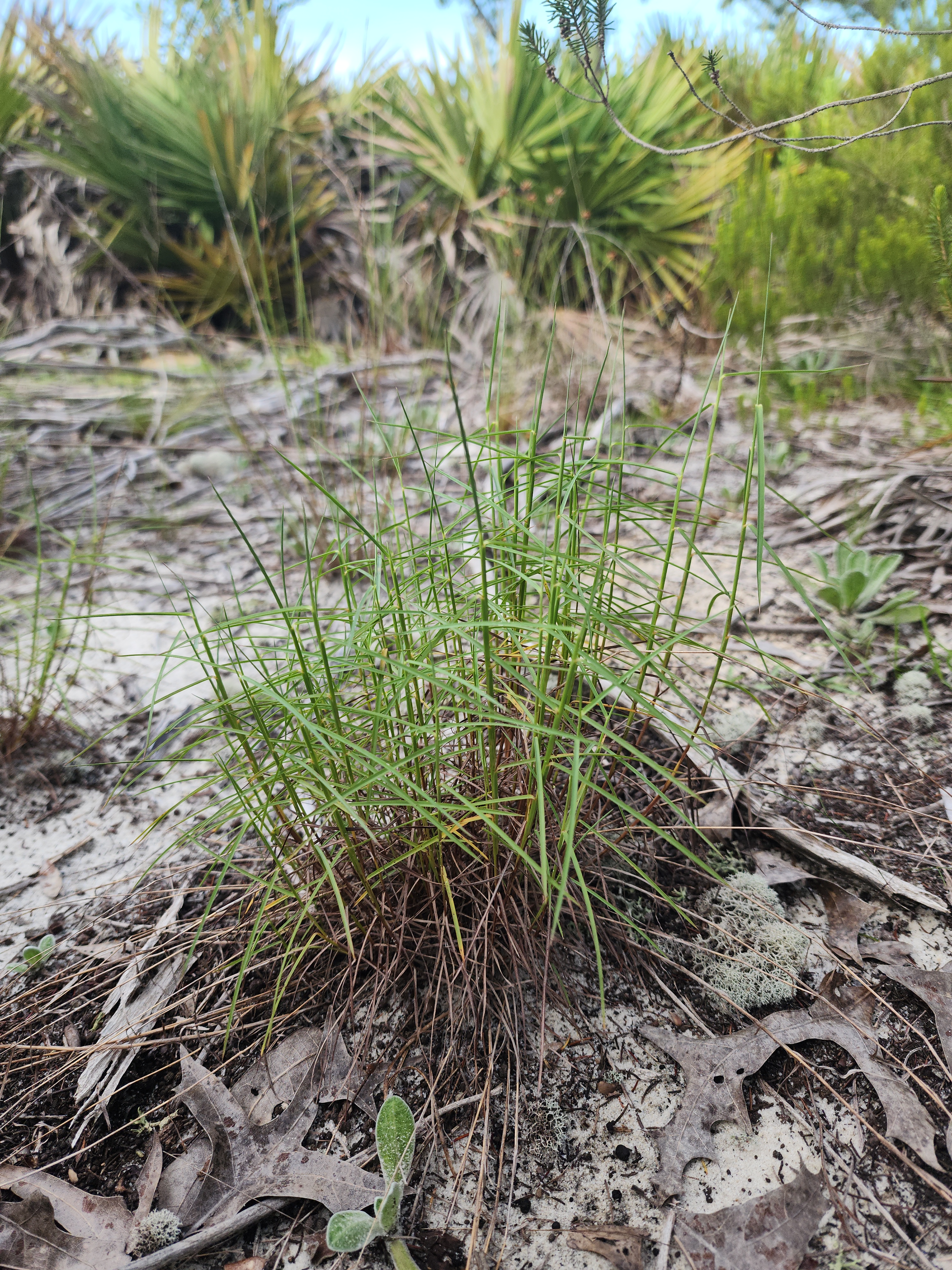
Yellow sand growth form (Leesburg, FL)

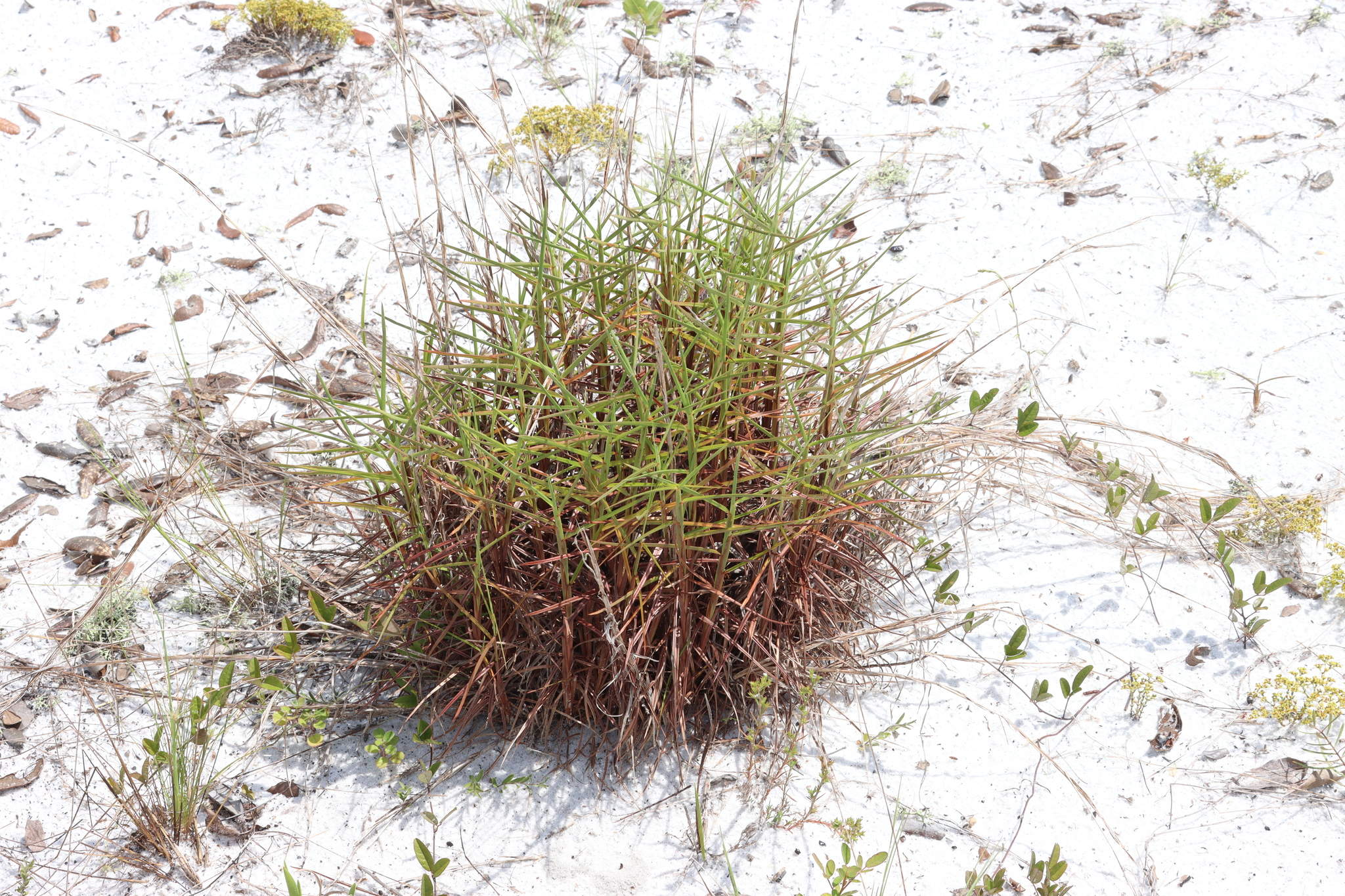
White sand growth form (Arbuckle State Forest, FL)

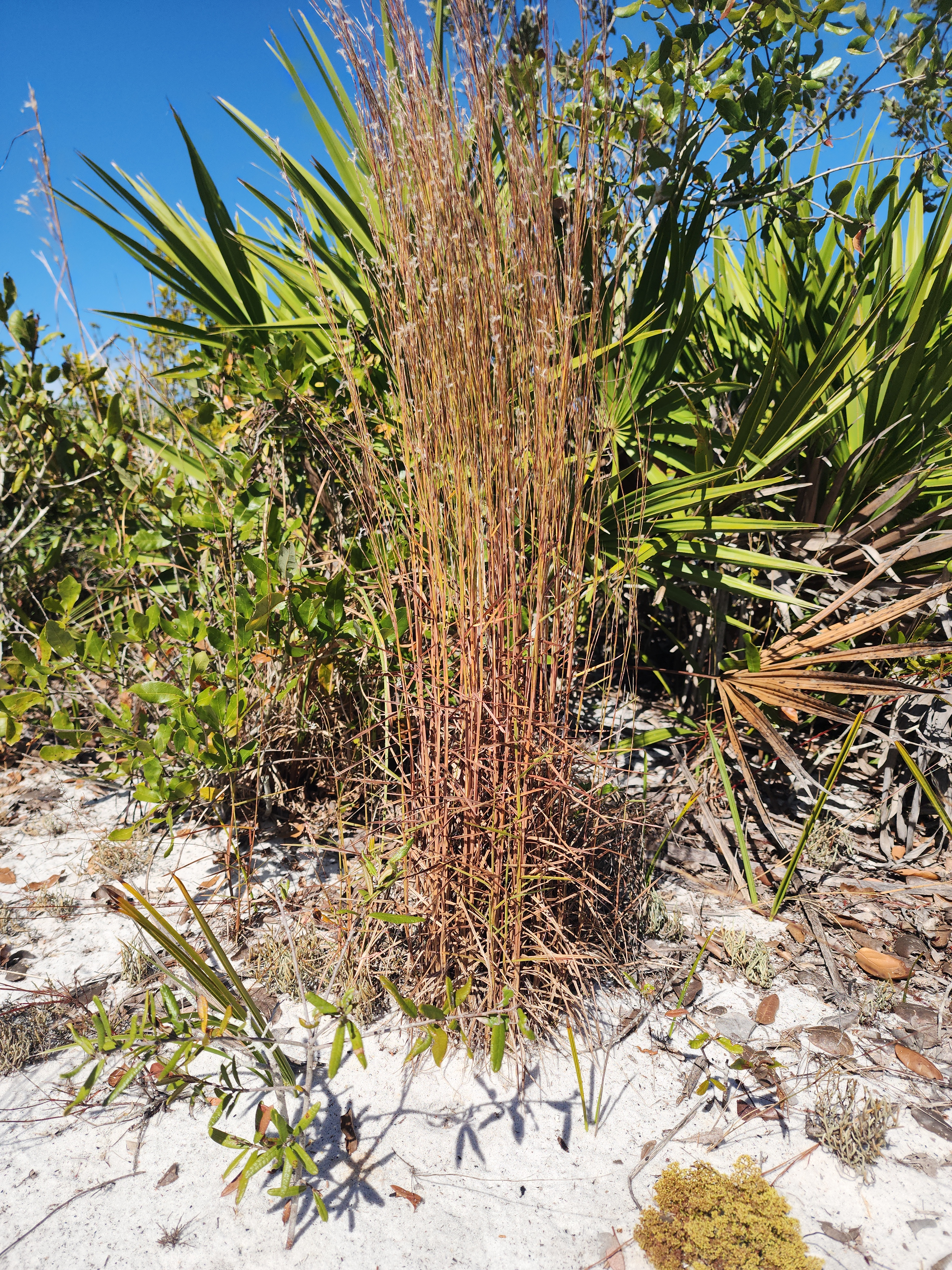
Gone to seed in white sand scrub (Archbold Biological Station, FL)
