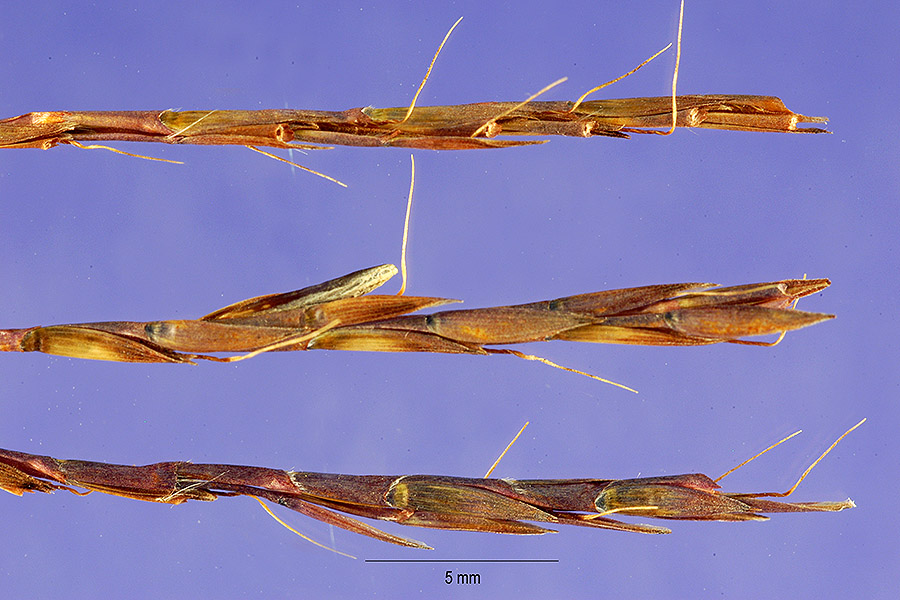
- Schizachyrium tenerum

Scientific classification
- Kingdom: Plantae
- Clade: Tracheophytes
- Clade: Angiosperms
- Clade: Monocots
- Clade: Commelinids
- Order: Poales
- Family: Poaceae
- Subfamily: Panicoideae
- Supertribe: Andropogonodae
- Tribe: Andropogoneae
- Subtribe: Andropogoninae
- Genus: Schizachyrium; Nees

Type species
- Schizachyrium brevifolium (Sw.) Nees ex Buse.

Synonyms
- Andropogon sect. Schizachyrium (Nees) Benth.; Andropogon subgen. Schizachyrium (Nees) Hack.; Schizopogon Rchb. ex Spreng.; Apogonia E.Fourn.; Ystia Compère

= Schizachyrium =

Bluestems

Genus of grasses

Schizachyrium is a widespread genus of plants in the grass family. The name is derived from the Ancient Greek words σχίζειν (schizein), meaning "to split," and ἄχυρον (achyron), meaning "chaff." It refers to either the glume or the toothed lemmas.

In the United States, members of the genus are commonly known as bluestems.

== Species ==
Species in the genus include:

- Schizachyrium beckii Killeen - Bolivia
- Schizachyrium bemarivense A.Camus - Madagascar
- Schizachyrium brevifolium (Sw.) Nees ex Buse – Serillo dulce - widespread in tropics
- Schizachyrium cirratum (Hack.) Wooton & Standl. - USA (AZ NM TX), Mexico, Venezuela, Colombia, Ecuador
- Schizachyrium claudopus (Chiov.) Chiov - Tanzania, Zaïre, Zambia
- Schizachyrium condensatum (Kunth) Nees – Colombian bluestem - West Indies, Latin America from central Mexico to Uruguay
- Schizachyrium crinizonatum S.T.Blake - Australia
- Schizachyrium cubense (Hack.) Nash - Cuba
- Schizachyrium delavayi (Hack.) Bor - China, Himalayas
- Schizachyrium delicatum Stapf - tropical Africa
- Schizachyrium djalonicum Jacq.-Fél. - Guinea to Sierra Leone
- Schizachyrium dolosum S.T.Blake - Northern Territory, Queensland
- Schizachyrium exile (Hochst.) Pilg. - tropical + southern Africa; Indian Subcontinent, Myanmar
- Schizachyrium fragile (R.Br.) A.Camus - southern China, Vietnam, Java, New Guinea, New Caledonia, Micronesia
- Schizachyrium gaumeri Nash - Yucatán Peninsula, Chiapas
- Schizachyrium gracile (Spreng.) Nash - West Indies, Guatemala, Chiapas, Florida
- Schizachyrium gracilipes (Hack.) A.Camus - southern Brazil, Paraguay, Uruguay, northeastern Argentina
- Schizachyrium gresicola Jacq.-Fél - Ghana, Guinea, Mali, Nigeria
- Schizachyrium hatschbachii Peichoto - Brazil, northern Argentina
- Schizachyrium impressum (Hack.) A.Camus - Jammu & Kashmir
- Schizachyrium jeffreysii (Hack.) Stapf - Angola, Zambia, Zimbabwe, Malawi, Mozambique, Botswana, Namibia, Limpopo, Mpumalanga
- Schizachyrium kwiluense Vanderyst ex Robyns - Zaïre, Congo Republic
- Schizachyrium lomaense A.Camus - Sierra Leone, Liberia, Ivory Coast
- Schizachyrium lopollense (Rendle) Sales- Angola, Zambia, Mozambique
- Schizachyrium maclaudii (Jacq.-Fél.) S.T.Blake - West Africa
- Schizachyrium malacostachyum (J.Presl) Nash - Mesoamerica, Colombia, West Indies
- Schizachyrium maritimum (Chapm.) Nash – Gulf bluestem - USA (LA MS AL FL)
- Schizachyrium mexicanum (Hitchc.) A.Camus - Mexico
- Schizachyrium mitchellianum B.K.Simon - Western Australia
- Schizachyrium muelleri Nash - Veracruz
- Schizachyrium mukuluense Vanderyst - Zaïre
- Schizachyrium multinervosum Nash - Cuba
- Schizachyrium niveum (Swallen) Gould – Pinescrub bluestem - Florida, Georgia
- Schizachyrium nodulosum (Hack.) Stapf - western + central Africa
- Schizachyrium occultum S.T.Blake - Northern Territory, Queensland
- Schizachyrium pachyarthron C.A.Gardner - Australia
- Schizachyrium parvifolium (Hitchc.) Borhidi & Catasús - Cuba
- Schizachyrium penicillatum Jacq.-Fél - Burkina Faso, Guinea, Sierra Leone
- Schizachyrium perplexum S.T.Blake - Northern Territory, Queensland
- Schizachyrium platyphyllum (Franch.) Stapf - Africa, Madagascar
- Schizachyrium pseudeulalia (Hosok.) S.T.Blake - Flores, Maluku, Sulawesi, Philippines, New Guinea, northern Australia, Caroline Is
- Schizachyrium pulchellum (D.Don ex Benth.) Stapf - tropical Africa
- Schizachyrium radicosum Jacq.-Fél - Guinea
- Schizachyrium reedii (Hitchc. & Ekman) Borhidi & Catasús - Cuba
- Schizachyrium rhizomatum (Swallen) Gould – Florida little bluestem - Florida
- Schizachyrium ruderale Clayton - western Africa
- Schizachyrium rupestre (K.Schum.) Stapf - tropical Africa, KwaZulu-Natal
- Schizachyrium salzmannii (Trin. ex Steud.) Nash - Mexico, Honduras, Lesser Antilles, South America
- Schizachyrium sanguineum (Retz.) Alston – Crimson bluestem - tropical Africa, tropical Asia, New Guinea, Latin America, West Indies, USA (AZ NM TX FL GA AL)
- Schizachyrium scabriflorum (Rupr. ex Hack.) A.Camus - Bolivia, Paraguay, northern Argentina, southern Brazil
- Schizachyrium schweinfurthii (Hack.) Stapf - tropical Africa
- Schizachyrium scintillans Stapf - tropical Africa
- Schizachyrium scoparium (Michx.) Nash – Little bluestem - widespread in Canada + USA + Mexico
- Schizachyrium semitectum (Swallen) Reeder - Mexico, Guatemala
- Schizachyrium spicatum (Spreng.) Herter - Uruguay, Paraguay, northern Argentina, southern Brazil
- Schizachyrium stoloniferum Nash - USA (MS AL GA FL NC SC)
- Schizachyrium sulcatum (Ekman) S.T.Blake - Colombia, Bolivia, western Brazil
- Schizachyrium tenerum Nees – Slender bluestem - USA (OK TX LA MS AL FL GA NC)
- Schizachyrium thollonii (Franch.) Stapf - tropical Africa
- Schizachyrium urceolatum (Hack.) Stapf - tropical Africa
- Schizachyrium yangambiense Germ. - Zaïre

Some species formerly included in Schizachyrum are now considered better suited to other genera: Andropogon, Dichanthium, Rottboellia, Sehima, Sphaerocaryum.
