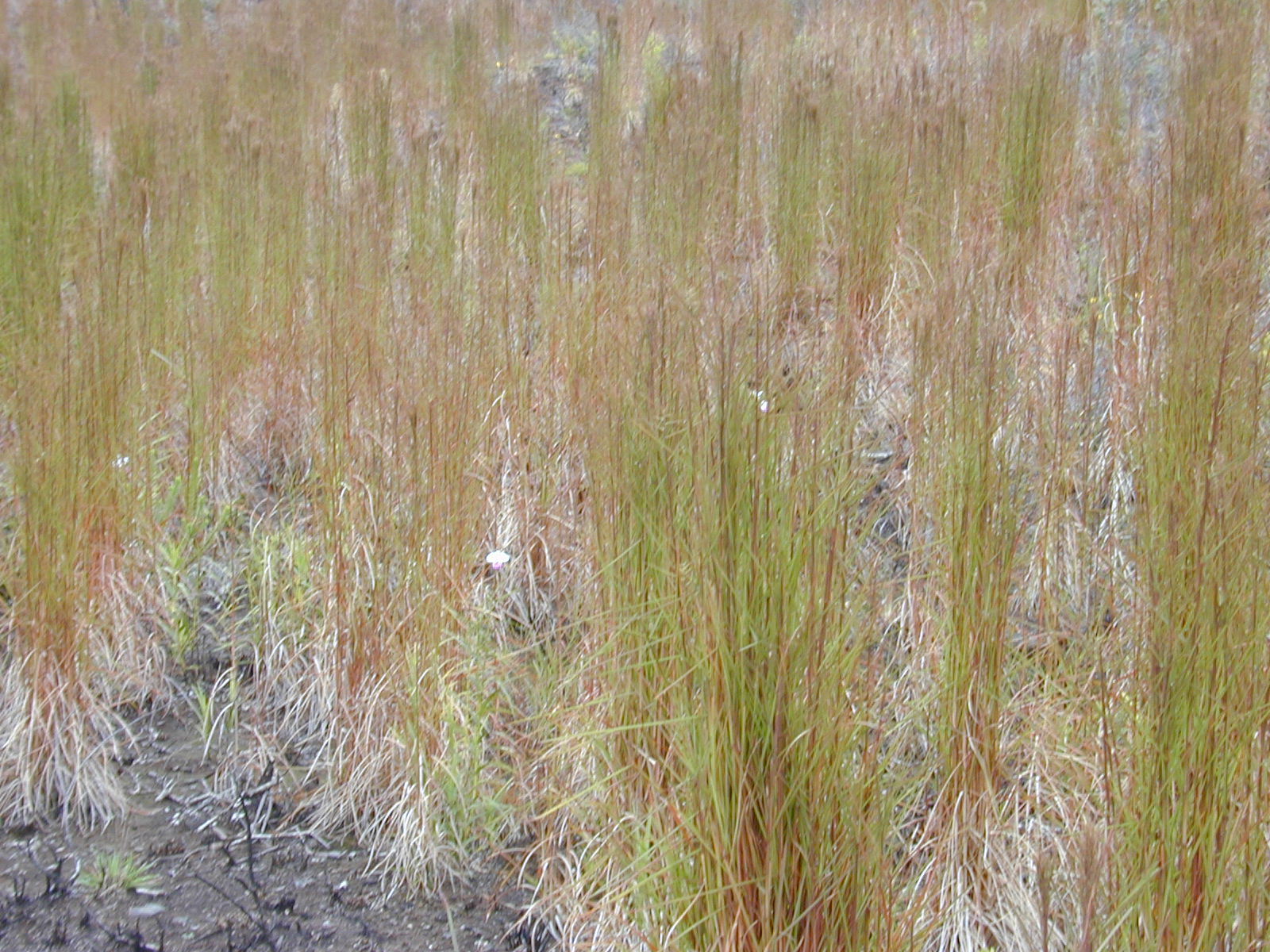

Scientific classification
- Kingdom: Plantae
- Clade: Tracheophytes
- Clade: Angiosperms
- Clade: Monocots
- Clade: Commelinids
- Order: Poales
- Family: Poaceae
- Subfamily: Panicoideae
- Genus: Schizachyrium
- Species: S. condensatum

Binomial name
- Schizachyrium condensatum (Kunth) Nees

= Schizachyrium condensatum =

Species of grass

Schizachyrium condensatum is a species of grass known by the English common names Colombian bluestem, bush beardgrass, and little bluestem, and the Spanish common names aguará ruguay and yerba barbuda. It is native to South America, and it is well known in other places as an introduced species and noxious weed, particularly in Hawaii.

This is a perennial grass growing up to 1.5 meters tall. It branches near the top of the stem, producing a wide, loose inflorescence up to 40 centimeters long.

This grass is very common in the dry woodlands of Hawaii. It competes with native vegetation, displacing it and forming thick monotypic stands. These stands become very flammable and increase the frequency of fire. After fire occurs, it is easier for a similarly invasive grass, Melinis minutiflora, to move in, which increases the total nonnative grass cover. S. condensatum then dies back.
