= Schizachyrium sanguineum =

Scientific classification
- Kingdom: Plantae
- Clade: Tracheophytes
- Clade: Angiosperms
- Clade: Monocots
- Clade: Commelinids
- Order: Poales
- Family: Poaceae
- Subfamily: Panicoideae
- Genus: Schizachyrium
- Species: S. sanguineum

Binomial name
- Schizachyrium sanguineum (Retz.) Alston (1931)

Synonyms
- Andropogon sanguineus Rottboellia sanguinea Thelepogon sanguineus

Species of grass

Schizachyrium sanguineum, also known as crimson bluestem, is a species of perennial graminoid found in the United States, as well as in Central and South America. Within the United States, this species occurs in two disconnected regions, one encompassing the states of Georgia, Alabama, and Florida, and the other encompassing Texas, New Mexico, and Arizona.

S. sanguineum can be found in habitats such as in disturbed sandy sites, sandhill systems, and in pine flatwoods.

Reaching a height of up to 4 ft (1.2 m), S. sanguineum is a type of grass that produces white to brown panicles from June through October.
