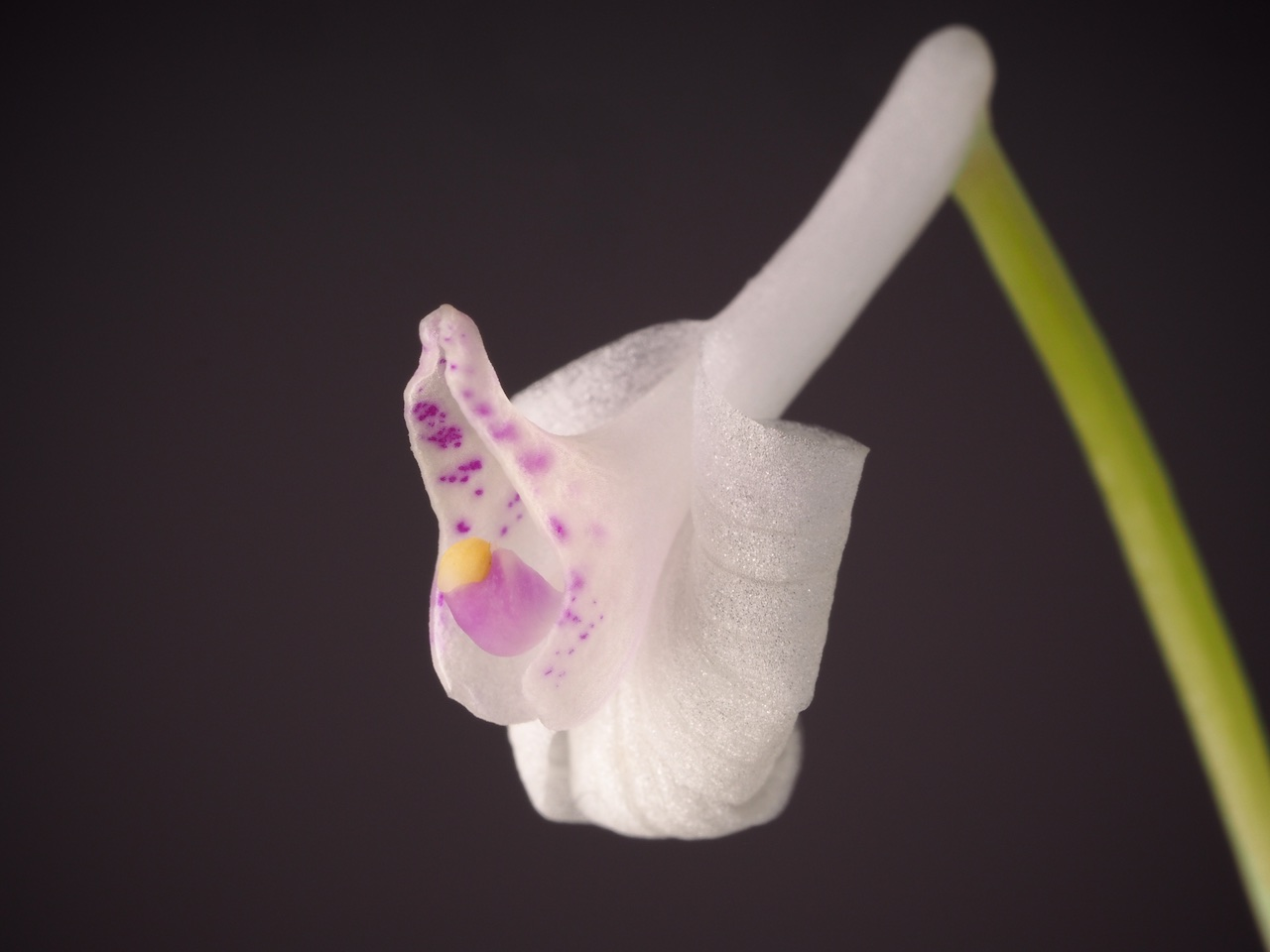

Conservation status
- CITES Appendix II

Scientific classification
- Kingdom: Plantae
- Clade: Tracheophytes
- Clade: Angiosperms
- Clade: Monocots
- Order: Asparagales
- Family: Orchidaceae
- Subfamily: Epidendroideae
- Tribe: Arethuseae
- Subtribe: Arethusinae
- Genus: Anthogonium; Wall. ex Lindl.
- Species: A. gracile

Binomial name
- Anthogonium gracile Wall. ex Lindl.

Synonyms
- Anthogonium griffithii Rchb.f.; Anthogonium corydaloides Schltr.

= Anthogonium =

Genus of orchids

Anthogonium is a monotypic genus of orchids. Its sole species, Anthogonium gracile, is found in India, Assam, Bangladesh, Nepal, Bhutan, Myanmar, Laos, Cambodia, Vietnam, Thailand, Malaysia, Guangxi, Guizhou, Tibet, and Yunnan.
