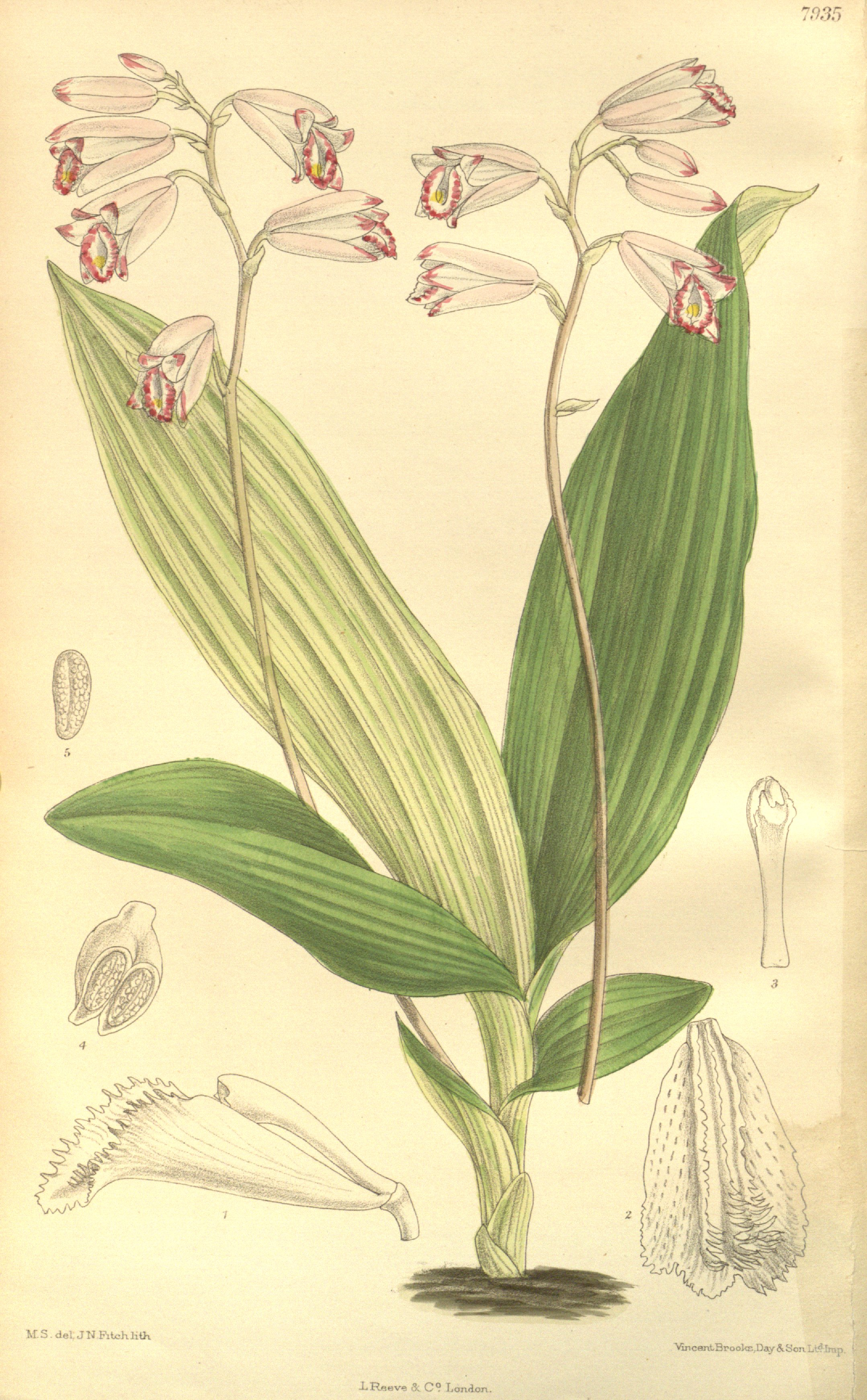

Scientific classification
- Kingdom: Plantae
- Clade: Tracheophytes
- Clade: Angiosperms
- Clade: Monocots
- Order: Asparagales
- Family: Orchidaceae
- Subfamily: Epidendroideae
- Tribe: Arethuseae
- Subtribe: Arethusinae
- Genus: Mengzia; W.C.Huang, Z.J.Liu & C.Hu
- Species: M. foliosa

Binomial name
- Mengzia foliosa (King & Pantl.) W.C.Huang, Z.J.Liu & C.Hu

Synonyms
- Arethusa sinensis Rolfe; Bletilla chinensis Schltr.; Bletilla foliosa (King & Pantl.) Tang & F.T.Wang; Bletilla sinensis (Rolfe) Schltr.; Jimensia sinensis (Rolfe) Garay & R.E.Schult.; Pogonia foliosa King & Pantl. (1897) (basionym)

= Mengzia =

Genus of orchids

Mengzia is a genus of orchids. It includes a single species, Mengzia foliosa, a rhizomatous geophyte native to Myanmar, Thailand, and southern Yunnan province in south-central China.
