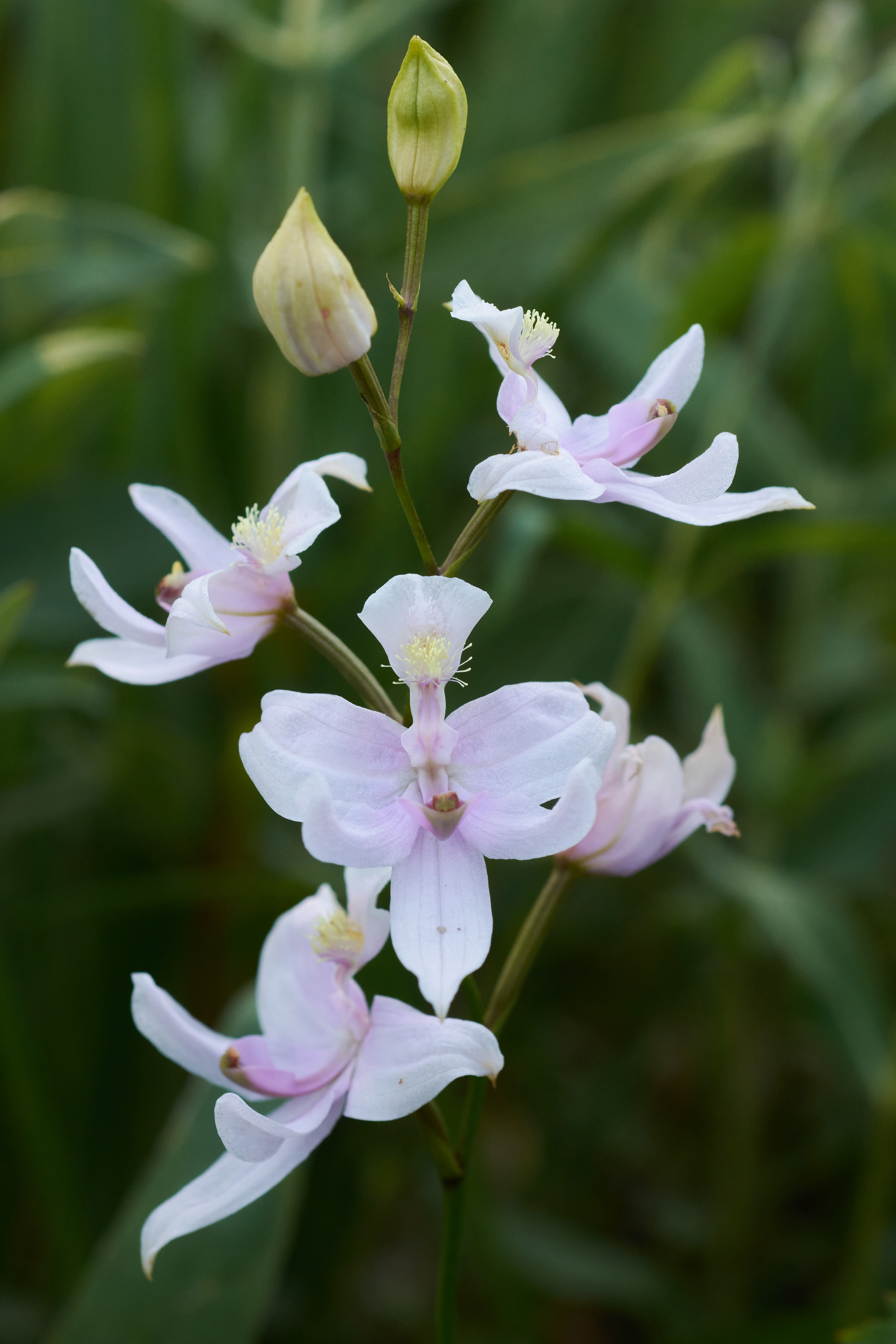

Conservation status
- Imperiled (NatureServe)

Scientific classification
- Kingdom: Plantae
- Clade: Tracheophytes
- Clade: Angiosperms
- Clade: Monocots
- Order: Asparagales
- Family: Orchidaceae
- Subfamily: Epidendroideae
- Tribe: Arethuseae
- Genus: Calopogon
- Species: C. oklahomensis

Binomial name
- Calopogon oklahomensis D.H.Goldman

= Calopogon oklahomensis =

Oklahoma grass pink

Species of orchid

Calopogon oklahomensis, commonly known as the Oklahoma grass pink or prairie grass pink, is a terrestrial species of orchid native to the United States. It is restricted to the states of Alabama, Arkansas, Georgia, Illinois, Indiana, Iowa, Kansas, Louisiana, Minnesota, Mississippi, Missouri, Oklahoma, South Carolina, Tennessee, Texas, and Wisconsin. It is extirpated (locally extinct) throughout most of its range. Calopogon oklahomensis is a perennial herb with flowers that are white, pink or purple, with a labellum with an apical region of yellow hairs. Flowers bloom March to July. Its habitats include coastal prairies, savannas, edges of bogs, and oak woodlands. It was described by Douglas H. Goldman in 1995.
