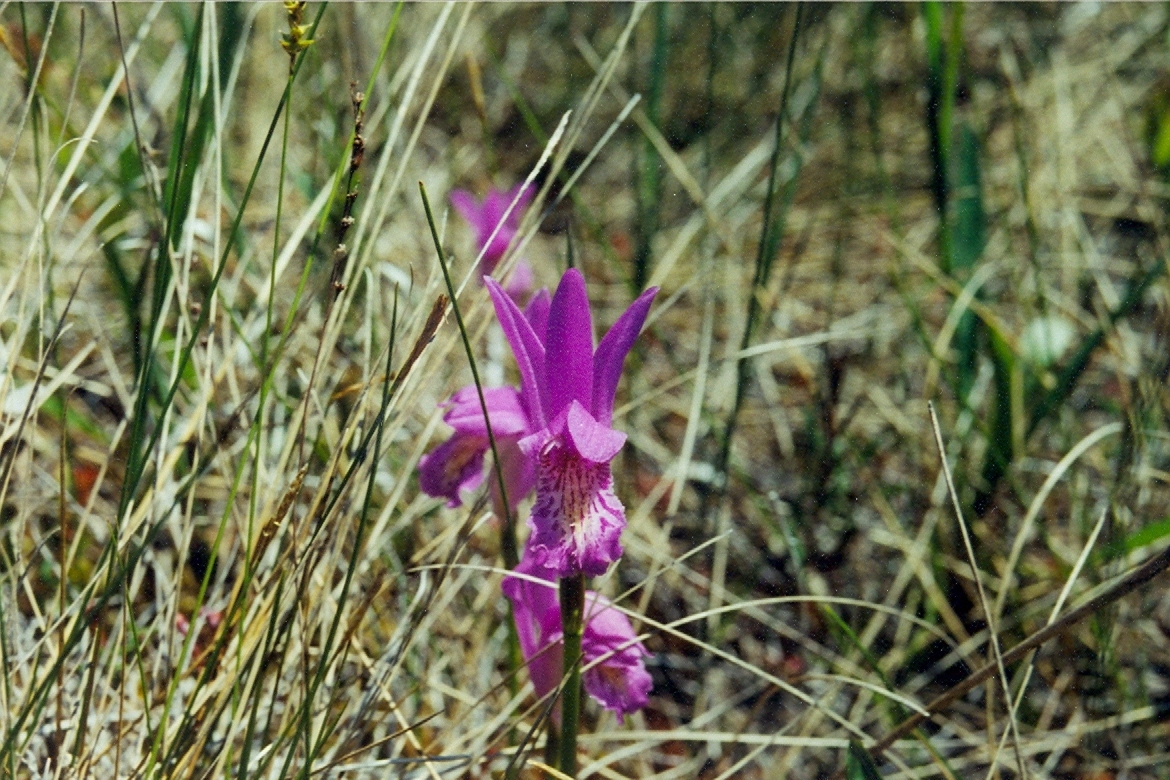
- Taken Pancake Bay, Ontario

Conservation status
- Least Concern (IUCN 3.1)

- Secure (NatureServe)

Scientific classification
- Kingdom: Plantae
- Clade: Tracheophytes
- Clade: Angiosperms
- Clade: Monocots
- Order: Asparagales
- Family: Orchidaceae
- Subfamily: Epidendroideae
- Tribe: Arethuseae
- Subtribe: Arethusinae
- Genus: Arethusa; L.
- Species: A. bulbosa

Binomial name
- Arethusa bulbosa L.

Synonyms
- Arethusa bulbosa f. albiflora E.L.Rand & Redfield; Arethusa bulbosa f. subcaerulea E.L.Rand & Redfield

= Dragon's mouth =

Dragon's mouth orchid

Species of orchid

Arethusa bulbosa, commonly called dragon's mouth orchid, is the only species in the orchid genus Arethusa. The genus is named after a naiad of Greek mythology. This monotypic genus is abbreviated Aret in trade journals.

This terrestrial and rare orchid occurs in Eastern North America from Manitoba east to Newfoundland and Saint Pierre and Miquelon south to Virginia, with isolated populations in northern Saskatchewan and in the Carolinas. It occurs in bogs, swamps and other wet lowlands. It grows to a height of 15 cm. It forms a large, single, pink terminal flower, with a showy lip and white and yellow fringed crests.

== Gallery ==
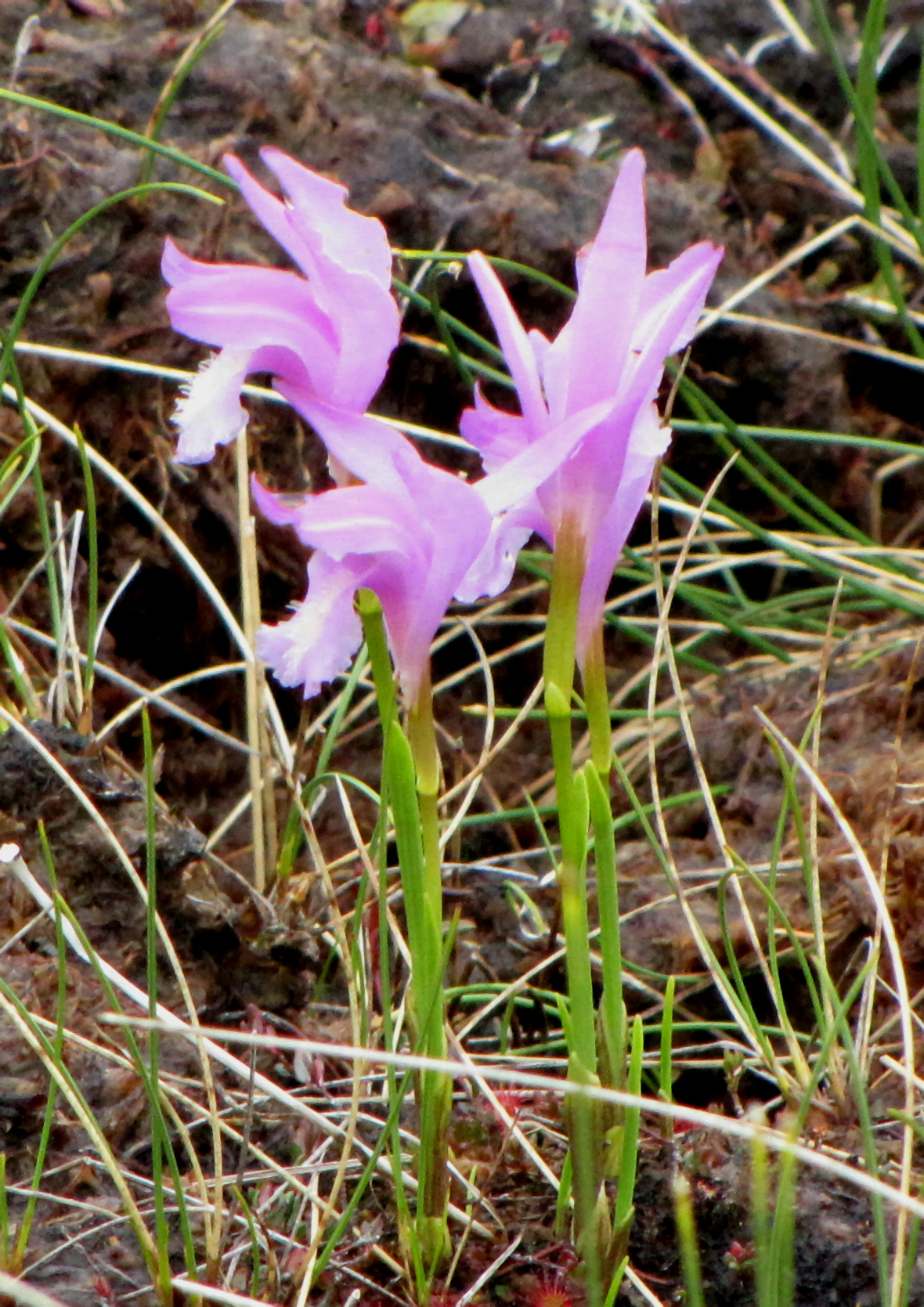
Western Brook Pond Trail, Gros Morne National Park, Newfoundland and Labrador

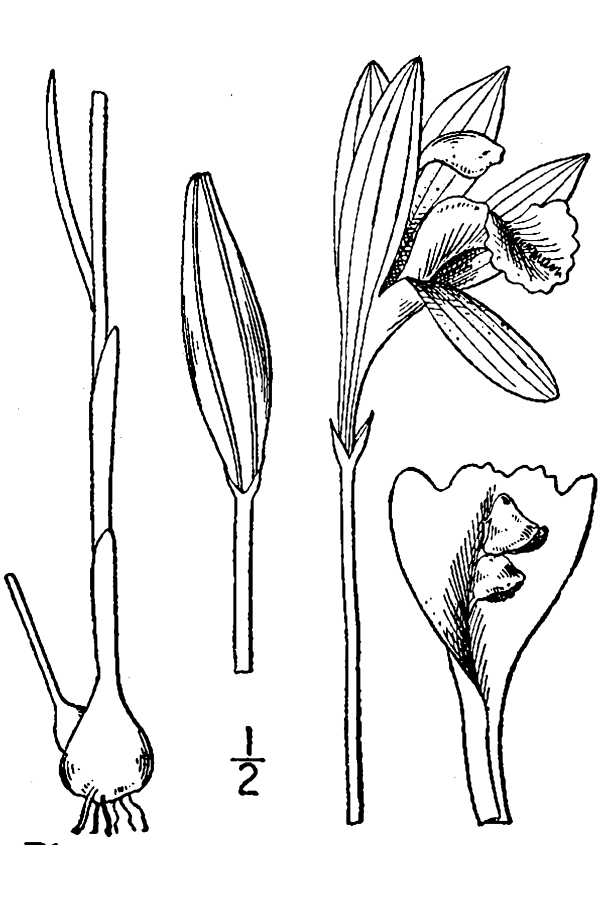
Drawing from Britton, N.L., and A. Brown. (1913). Illustrated flora of the northern states and Canada.

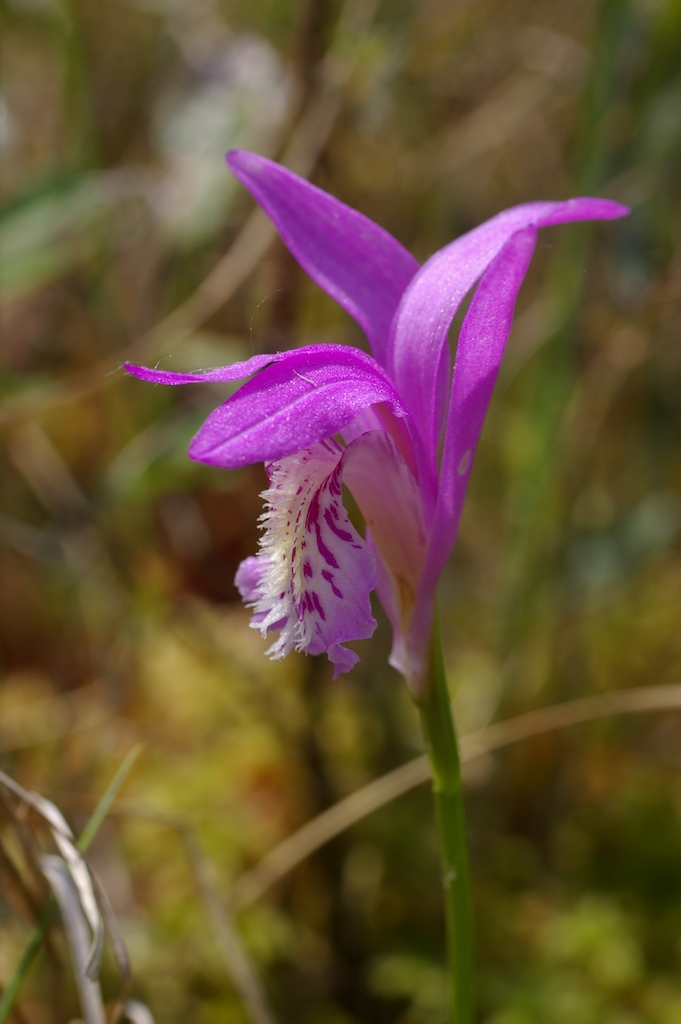
Waterloo State Recreation Area, Michigan
