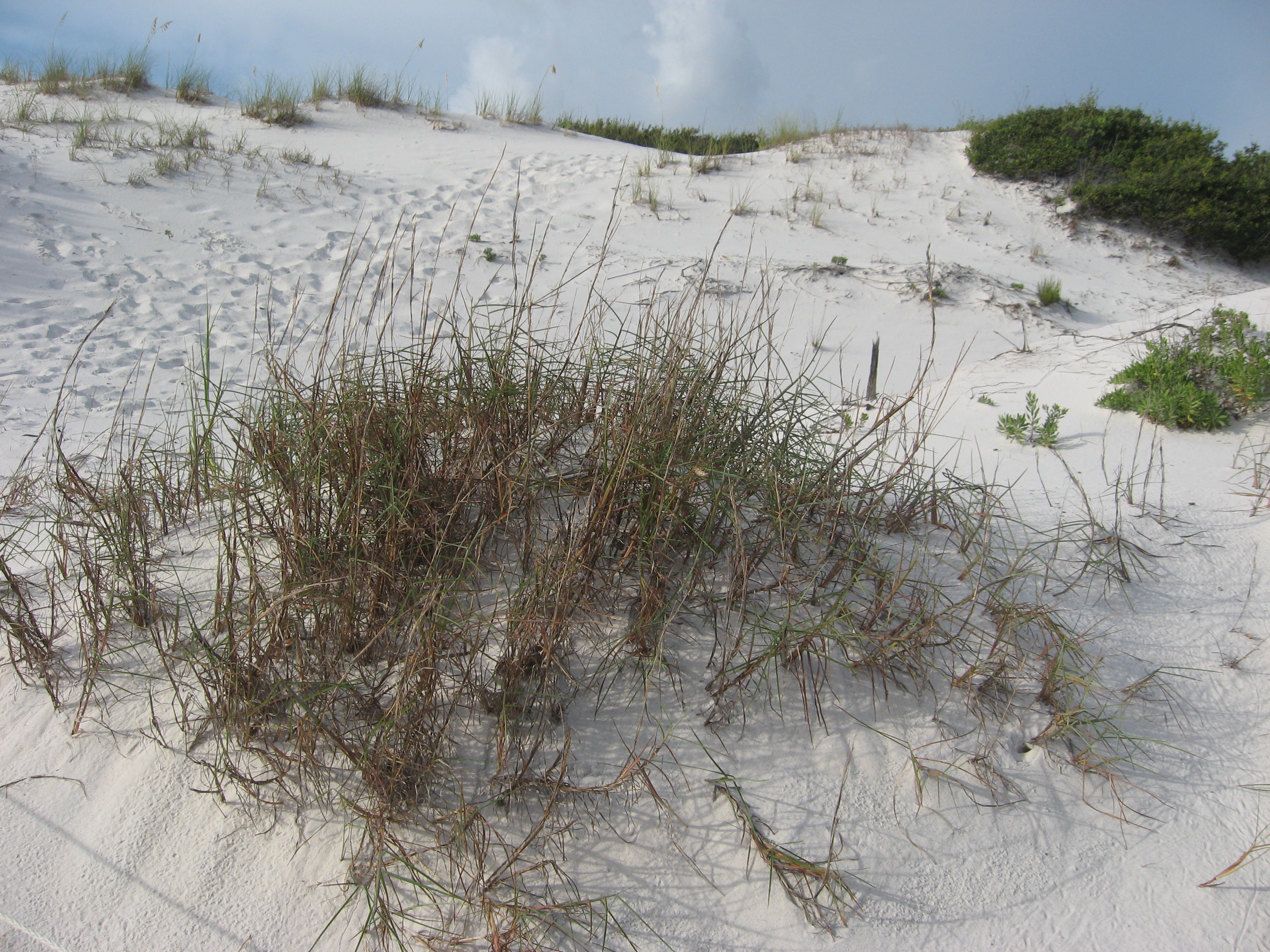

Conservation status
- Vulnerable (NatureServe)

Scientific classification
- Kingdom: Plantae
- Clade: Tracheophytes
- Clade: Angiosperms
- Clade: Monocots
- Clade: Commelinids
- Order: Poales
- Family: Poaceae
- Subfamily: Panicoideae
- Genus: Schizachyrium
- Species: S. maritimum

Binomial name
- Schizachyrium maritimum (Chapm.) Nash

= Schizachyrium maritimum =

Species of grass

Schizachyrium maritimum is a species of grass known by the common name Gulf bluestem. It is native to the Gulf Coast of the United States, where its distribution extends from Louisiana to the Florida Panhandle.

This species produces single stems that lie decumbent, often rooting at nodes that come in contact with the sandy substrate, making them look like rhizomes. The stems are waxy and reddish in color. The leaf blades are 11 centimeters to well over one meter long.

This plant grows at the coastal waterline. It is sometimes submerged in water. It binds the soil. It is considered "the most important species of bluestem grass on the Gulf of Mexico." It is commonly used in coastal revegetation projects on the Gulf. It provides habitat for several types of animals.
