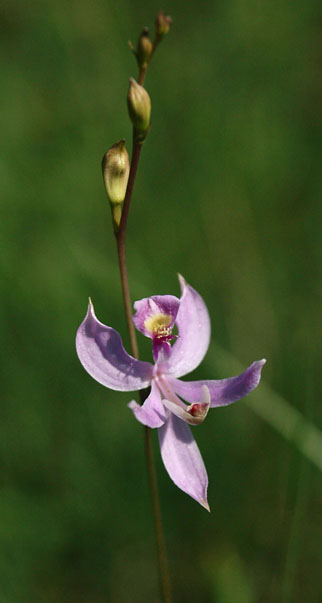

Conservation status
- Apparently Secure (NatureServe)

Scientific classification
- Kingdom: Plantae
- Clade: Tracheophytes
- Clade: Angiosperms
- Clade: Monocots
- Order: Asparagales
- Family: Orchidaceae
- Subfamily: Epidendroideae
- Tribe: Arethuseae
- Genus: Calopogon
- Species: C. pallidus

Binomial name
- Calopogon pallidus Chapm.

Synonyms
- Helleborine pallida (Chapm.) Kuntze; Limodorum pallidum (Chapm.) Mohr; Calopogon pallidus f. albiflorus P.M.Br.

= Calopogon pallidus =

Pale grass-pink

Species of orchid

Calopogon pallidus, the pale grass-pink, is a species of orchid native to the southeastern United States, from Louisiana to Virginia.
