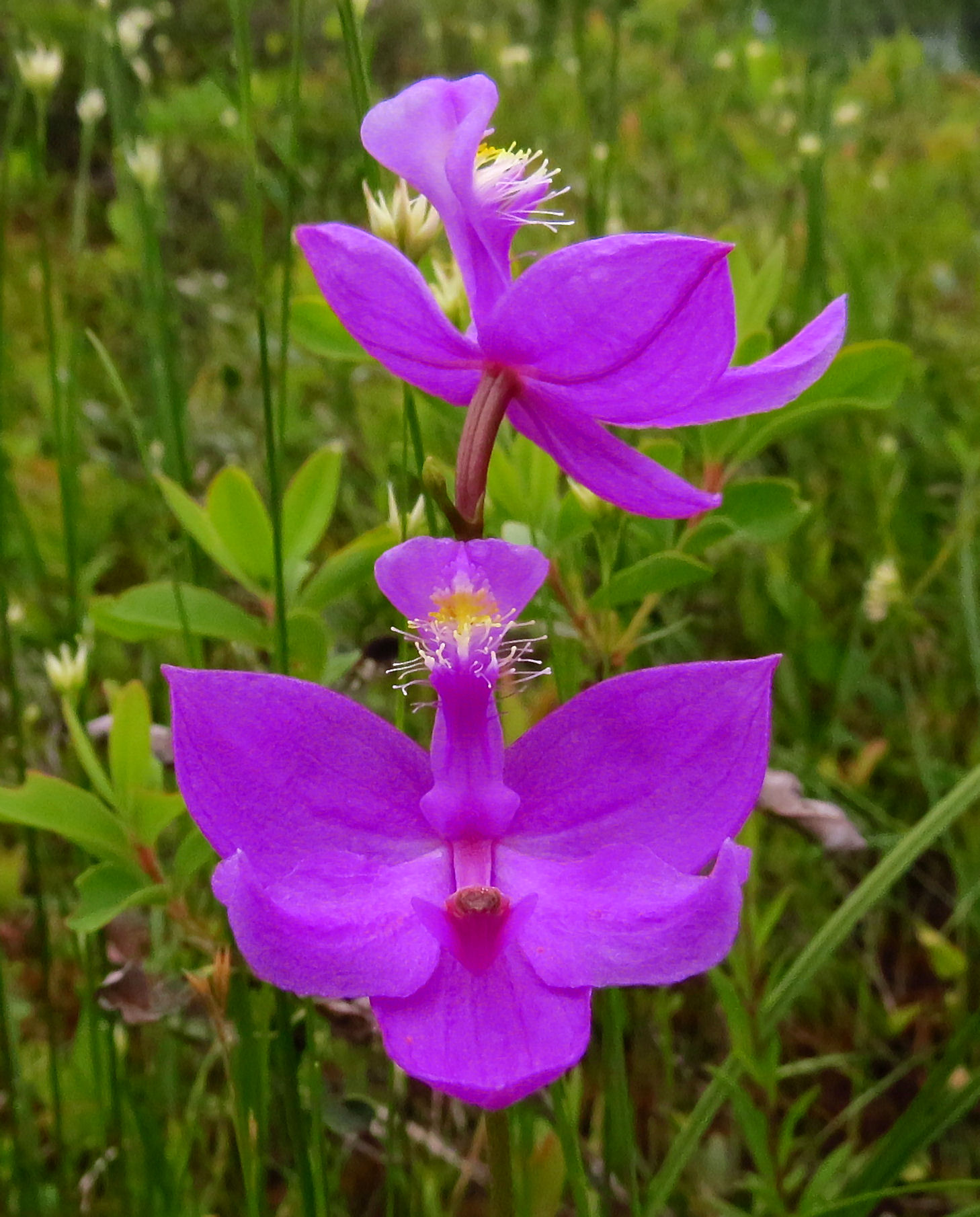
- Ottawa, Ontario

Conservation status
- Least Concern (IUCN 3.1)

- Secure (NatureServe)

Scientific classification
- Kingdom: Plantae
- Clade: Tracheophytes
- Clade: Angiosperms
- Clade: Monocots
- Order: Asparagales
- Family: Orchidaceae
- Subfamily: Epidendroideae
- Tribe: Arethuseae
- Genus: Calopogon
- Species: C. tuberosus

Binomial name
- Calopogon tuberosus L., Britton, Sterns & Poggenb.

Synonyms
- List: Bletia tuberosa (L.) Ames; Calopogon pulchellus Fernald; Calopogon pulchellus (Salisb.) R.Br.; Calopogon pulchellus f. albiflorus (Britton) Fernald; Calopogon pulchellus f. latifolius H.St.John; Calopogon pulchellus var. latifolius (H.St.John) Fernald; Calopogon pulchellus var. simpsonii (Small) Ames ex Correll; Calopogon tuberosus f. albiflorus Britton; Calopogon tuberosus var. latifolius (H.St.John) B.Boivin; Calopogon tuberosus f. niveus P.M.Br.; Cathea pulchella (Salisb.) Salisb.; Cathea pulchella f. albiflora (Britton) House; Cathea pulchella f. latifolia (Britton) House; Cathea pulchella f. linearifolia House; Cathea tuberosa (L.) Morong; Cymbidium pulchellum (Salisb.) Sw.; Helleborine tuberosa (L.) Kuntze; Limodorum pulchellum Salisb.; Limodorum simpsonii Small; Limodorum tuberosum L.; Limodorum tuberosum f. albiflorum House; Limodorum tuberosum f. latifolium (H.St.John) House; Limodorum tuberosum f. linariifolium House; Limodorum tuberosum var. nanum Nieuwl.

= Calopogon tuberosus =

Tuberous grass pink

Species of orchid

Calopogon tuberosus, the tuberous grass pink, is an orchid native to eastern North America. It is a perennial forb.

== Description ==
The main identifying features of C. tuberosus are the species' prominent hairs positioned on the lip of a petal (sometimes referred to as "the Beard") and the smell produced by the flower.

Individuals have one (occasionally two) linear basal leaves. Flowers are magenta, pink, or rarely white in color, and the middle petal is distinctively oblong-elliptic in shape. The flowers of C. tuberosus have a labellum which faces upwards, a trait fairly uncommon among orchids called non-resupination. The average maximum root depth has been found to be 7 centimeters (approximately 2.75 inches).

== Distribution and habitat ==
In the United States, it occurs from as far southwest as Texas and Oklahoma and southeast to the Florida Everglades to as far northeast as Maine and as far northwest as Minnesota. In Canada, it is found in all provinces from Newfoundland to Manitoba. It also is found in Saint Pierre and Miquelon, Cuba and the Bahamas.

From April to September, C. tuberosus may be found in habitats such as sandhill seeps, floating peat mats, and savannas. It may also be found in habitats such as fens, bogs, pine flatwoods, and marl prairies.

== Ecology ==
C. tuberosus is pollinated by bumblebees despite a lack of nectar incentive. Bumblebees, while looking for nonexistent nectar, weigh down the hinged lip causing the bee to be moved into contact with the pollinarium. The pollinarium is sticky and then can be flown by the bee to pollinate another orchid.

== Subspecies ==
- Calopogon tuberosus var. simpsonii (Small) Magrath
- Calopogon tuberosus var. tuberosus

== Conservation status ==
It is listed as "G5 - Secure" under the NatureServe conservation status system. However it is listed as an endangered species by the states of Illinois, Kentucky, and Maryland, and as exploitably vulnerable by New York.

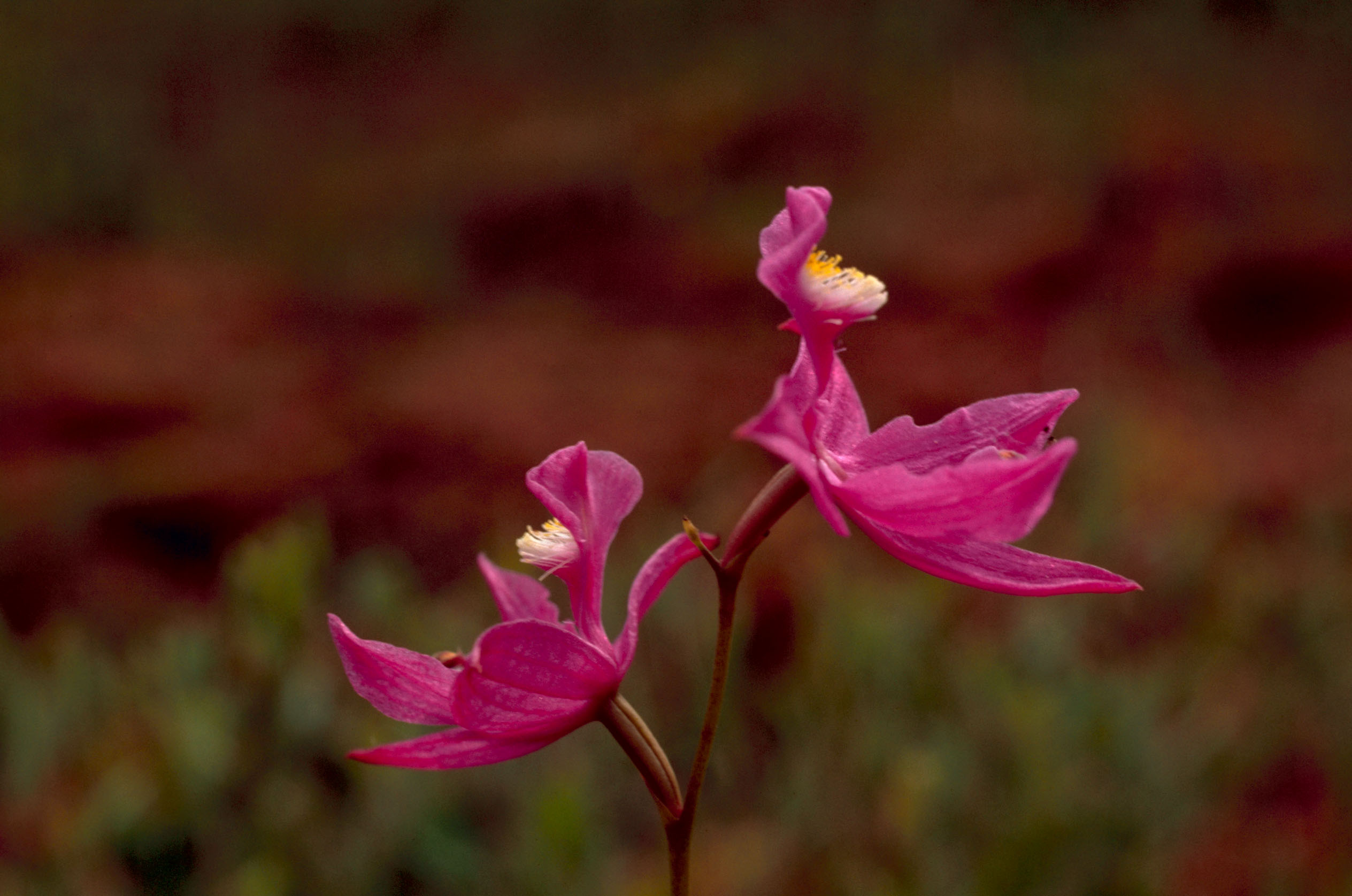
Wild pink orchid

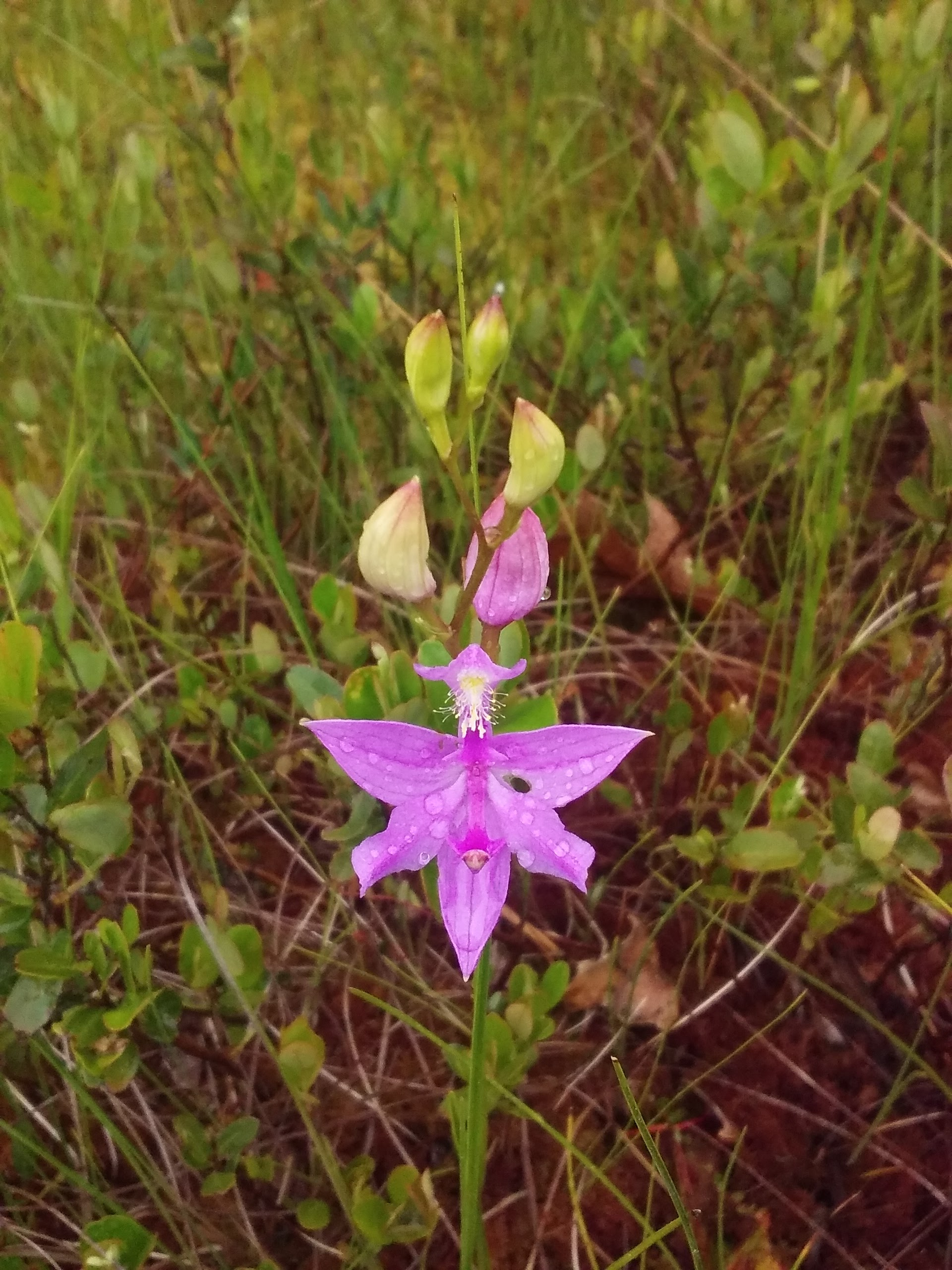
Flower and buds in Saco Heath, Maine
