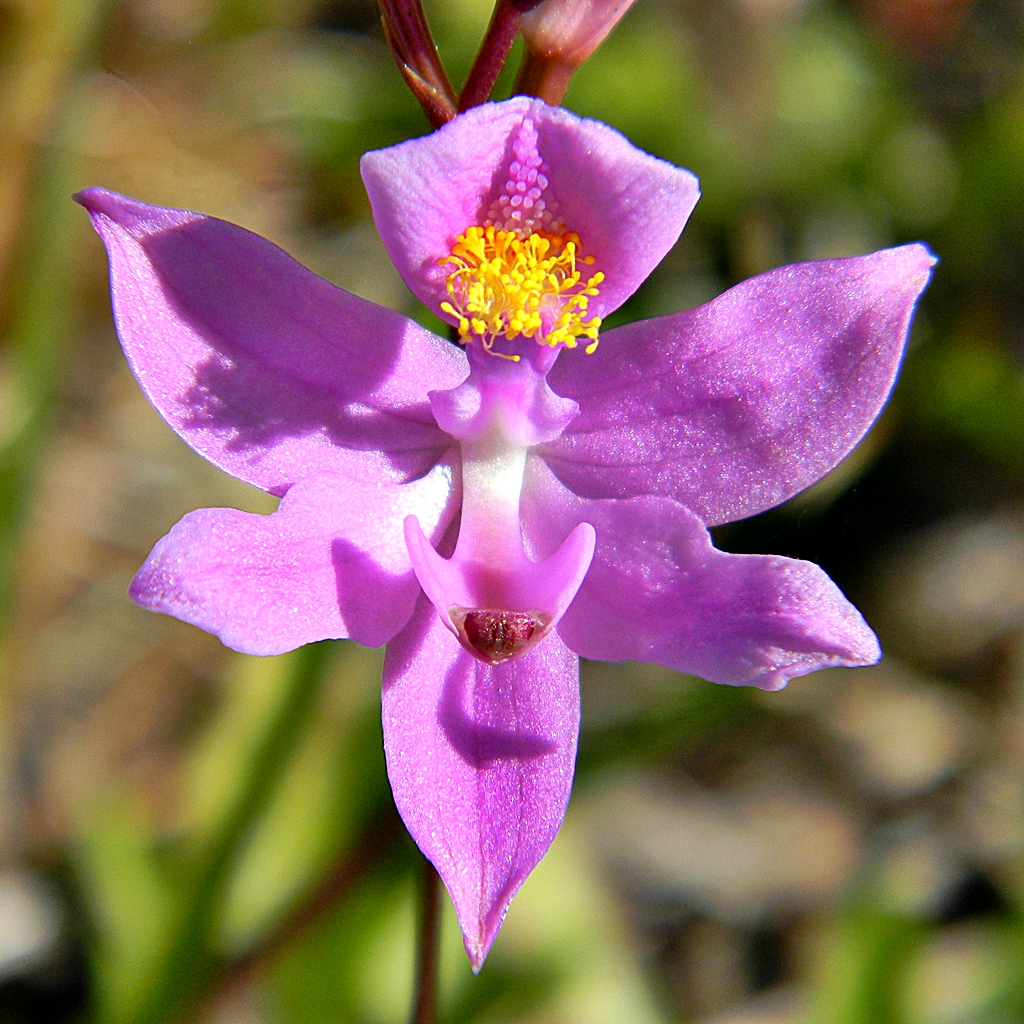

Conservation status
- Apparently Secure (NatureServe)

Scientific classification
- Kingdom: Plantae
- Clade: Tracheophytes
- Clade: Angiosperms
- Clade: Monocots
- Order: Asparagales
- Family: Orchidaceae
- Subfamily: Epidendroideae
- Tribe: Arethuseae
- Genus: Calopogon
- Species: C. barbatus

Binomial name
- Calopogon barbatus (Walter) Ames

Synonyms
- Ophrys barbata Walter; Limodorum barbatum (Walter) Lam.; Calopogon pulchellus var. graminifolius Elliott; Calopogon parviflorus Raf. 1832; Calopogon parviflorus Lindl. 1840, not Raf. 1832; Helleborine graminifolia (Elliott) Kuntze; Limodorum parviflorum Nash; Calopogon barbatus f. albiflorus P.M.Br.; Calopogon barbatus f. lilacinus P.M.Br.

= Calopogon barbatus =

Bearded grass-pink

Species of orchid

Calopogon barbatus, the bearded grass-pink, is a species of orchid native to the southeastern United States, from Louisiana to North Carolina.

== Distribution ==
Calopogon barbatus grow in wet, acidic, sandy grasslands and pine savannas across Alabama, Florida, Georgia, Louisiana, Mississippi, North Carolina, and South Carolina, USA, at elevations from sea level to 100 metres (330 ft).
