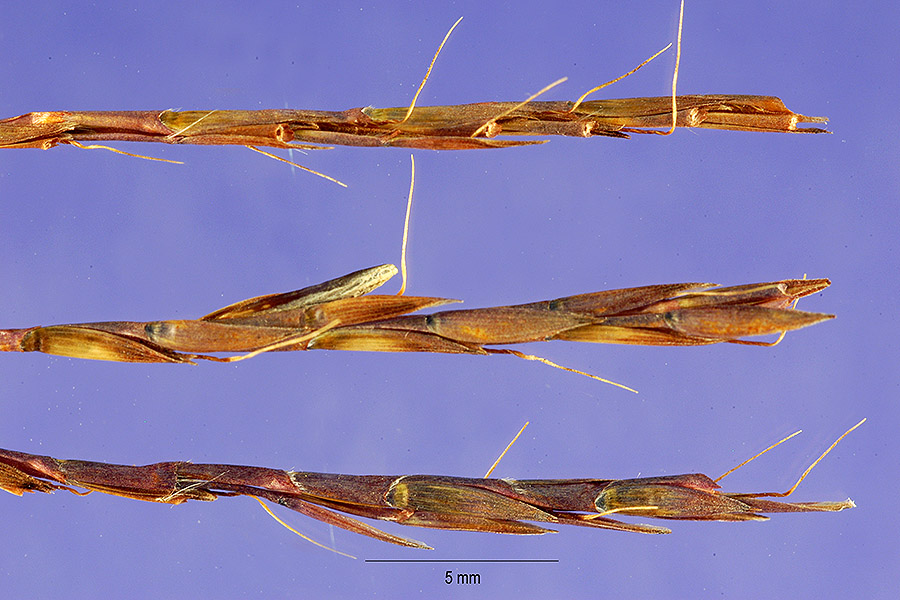

Conservation status
- Secure (NatureServe)

Scientific classification
- Kingdom: Plantae
- Clade: Tracheophytes
- Clade: Angiosperms
- Clade: Monocots
- Clade: Commelinids
- Order: Poales
- Family: Poaceae
- Subfamily: Panicoideae
- Genus: Schizachyrium
- Species: S. tenerum

Binomial name
- Schizachyrium tenerum Nees

Synonyms
- Andropogon tener

= Schizachyrium tenerum =

Species of plant

Schizachyrium tenerum is a species of grass known by the common name slender little bluestem, or slender bluestem. It is native to the Americas, where it occurs in North, Central, and South America. In North America it can be found in the southeastern United States and much of Mexico.

This plant produces bunches of erect or leaning stems up to a meter long. The wiry leaves are up to 15 or 20 centimeters in length. The inflorescence is a raceme of paired spikelets. The fertile spikelet has an awn up to a centimeter long; the sterile spikelet lacks an awn.

In the United States this grass grows in pine forests and on the coastal plain. It and the pinehill bluestem (S. scoparium var. divergens) may codominate habitat in the understory of longleaf pine (Pinus palustris). It grows in pine savanna, seeps, pitcher plant bogs, dry prairies, sandhills, and floodplains.
