= Elp =

- Village
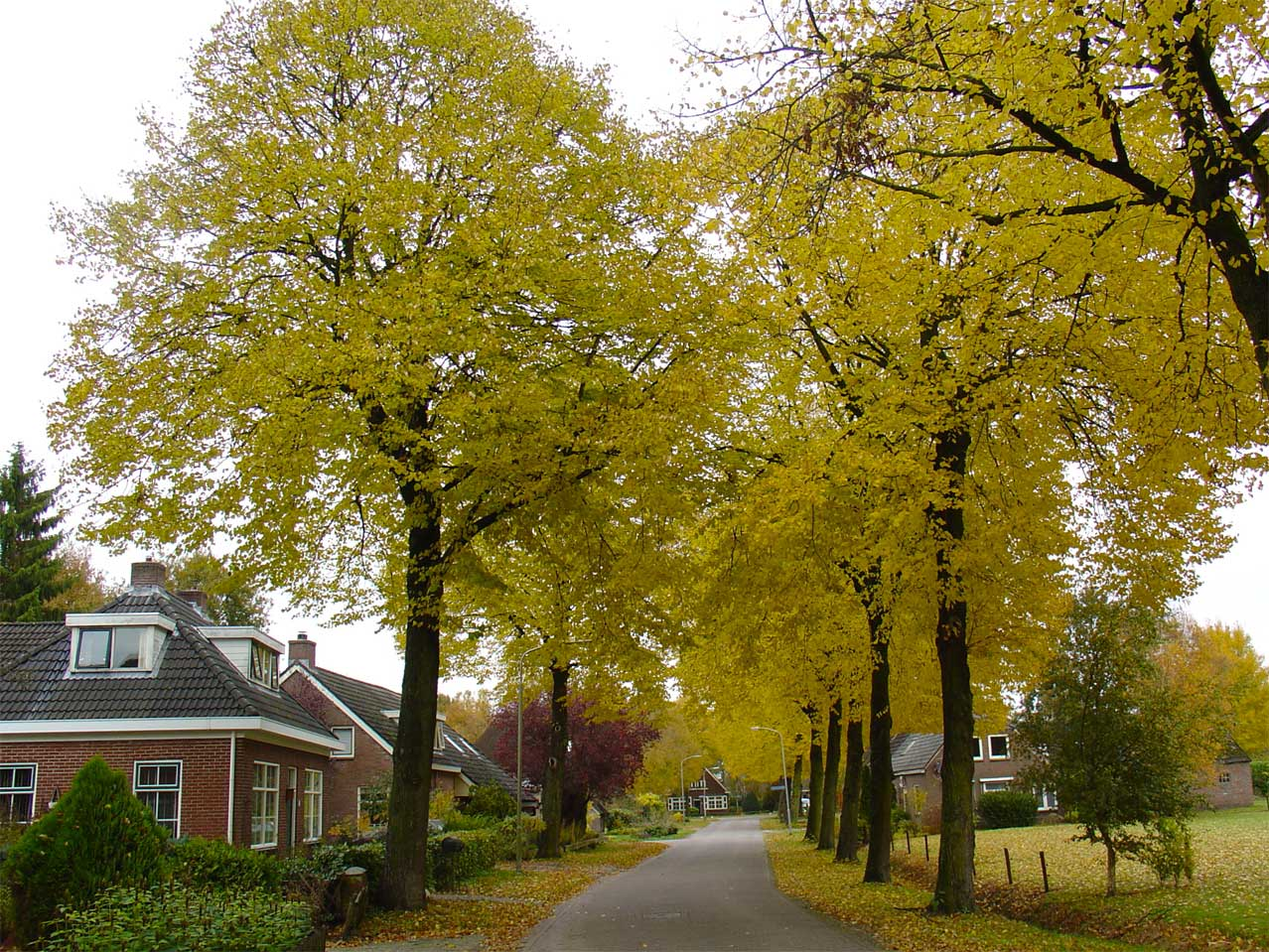
- The main street of Elp

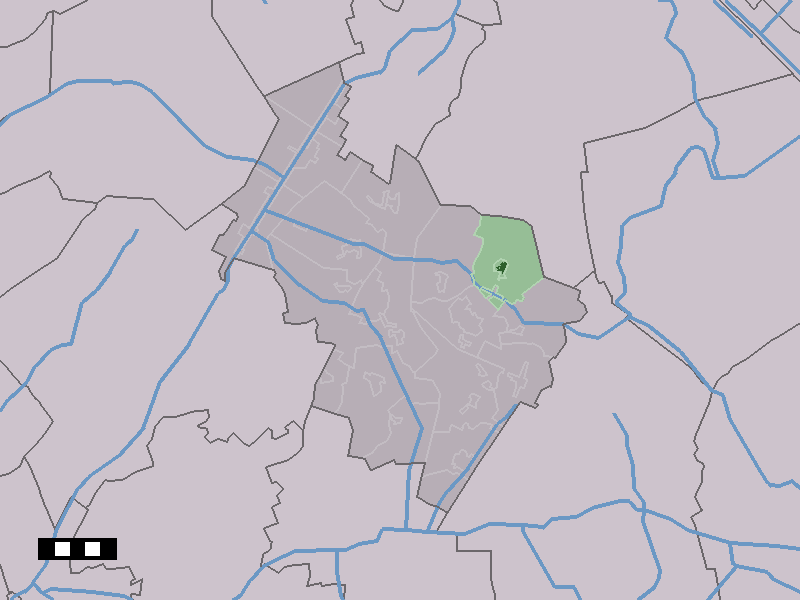
- The village centre (dark green) and the statistical district (light green) of Elp in the municipality of Midden-Drenthe.

- Location in the Netherlands Elp (Netherlands)
- Coordinates: 52°53′1″N 6°38′52″E
- Country: Netherlands
- Province: Drenthe
- Municipality: Midden-Drenthe

Area
  - Total: 20.49 km^{2} (7.91 sq mi)
- Elevation: 18 m (59 ft)

Population (2021)
  - Total: 375
  - Density: 18.3/km^{2} (47.4/sq mi)
- Time zone: UTC+1 (CET)
  - Summer (DST): UTC+2 (CEST)
- Postal code: 9442
- Dialing code: 0593

Elp is a small village in the Dutch province of Drenthe. It is a part of the municipality of Midden-Drenthe, and lies about 15 km south of Assen.

The village was first mentioned in 1362 as "in Elpe". The etymology is unclear.

Elp was home to 243 people in 1840.

The Elp culture was named after the village.

== See also ==
- Elp culture
