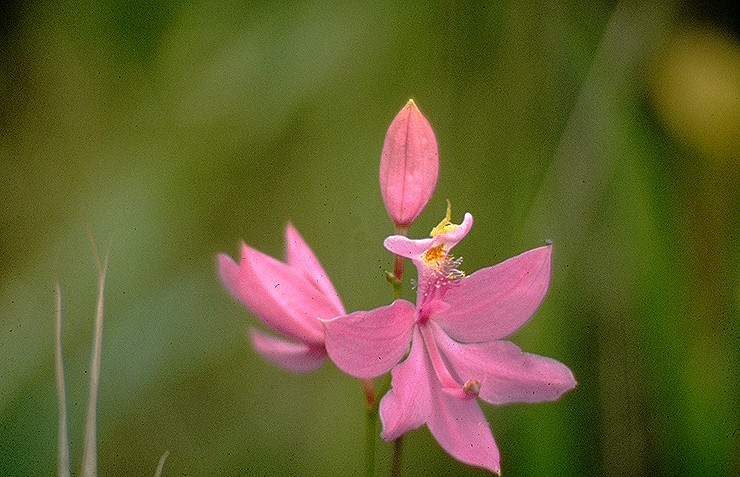
- Calopogon tuberosus var. tuberosus

Scientific classification
- Kingdom: Plantae
- Clade: Tracheophytes
- Clade: Angiosperms
- Clade: Monocots
- Order: Asparagales
- Family: Orchidaceae
- Subfamily: Epidendroideae
- Tribe: Arethuseae
- Subtribe: Arethusinae
- Genus: Calopogon; R.Br.

Type species
- Calopogon tuberosus

Synonyms
- Cathea Salisb.; Helleborine Kuntze

= Calopogon =

Grass pink

Genus of orchids

Calopogon, grass pink, is a genus of terrestrial orchids (family Orchidaceae). The generic name is from Greek and means "beautiful beard", referring to the cluster of hairs adorning the labellum. The five species are native to the eastern United States, eastern Canada, Cuba and the Bahamas. The genus Calopogon is abbreviated Cpg in trade journals.

Calopogon, like many other orchids, is an indicator species for good remnant hydrology. This means that their presence is an indication of high-quality ground and surface water. Most species of Calopogon frequent wet, sunny swales, bogs, and the edges of marshy areas, and associate with ferns, sedges, grasses and forbs. Calopogon oklahomensis has been observed in drier areas than Calopogon tuberosus would prefer.

One distinguishing feature of the grass pinks is that, unlike most orchids, they are non-resupinate. The lip of calopogon is on the top of the flower, not the bottom, as is common with most other genera. The brushy, yellow protuberances on the lip are also designed to attract pollinators, but they only tempt without providing a reward. To add injury to insult, the flower then snaps closed when a potential pollinator lands on it, and the insect has to crawl out of the tight quarters between the lip and the reproductive parts below in order to escape, hopefully pollinating the flower in the process.

The other deception they use is their frequent association with nectar-bearing flowers of the same color; Calopogon is often an associate of the magenta marsh phlox, in the northern United States, the phlox bearing nectar to reward curious insects while the deceptive but showy Calopogon does not.

== Species ==
Five species are currently accepted as of May 2014:

Image	Name	Distribution
	Calopogon barbatus (Walter) Ames	from Louisiana to North Carolina
	Calopogon multiflorus Lindl.	from Louisiana to North Carolina
	Calopogon oklahomensis D.H.Goldman	Mississippi Valley, west to Texas and Oklahoma, east to Georgia
	Calopogon pallidus Chapm.	from Louisiana to Virginia
	Calopogon tuberosus (L.) Britton	from Texas to Florida, north to Manitoba and Nova Scotia, also Cuba and Bahamas
