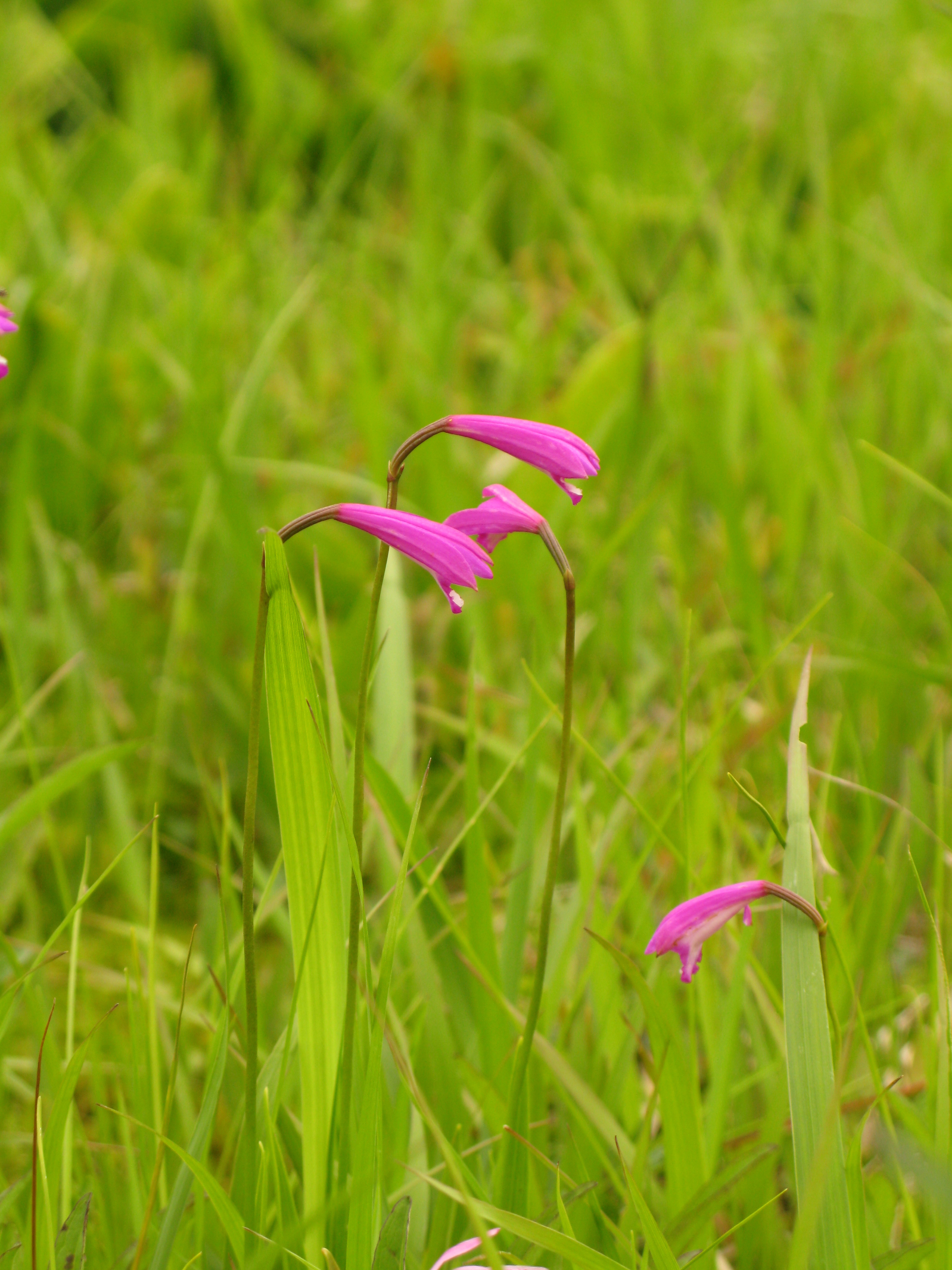

Scientific classification
- Kingdom: Plantae
- Clade: Tracheophytes
- Clade: Angiosperms
- Clade: Monocots
- Order: Asparagales
- Family: Orchidaceae
- Subfamily: Epidendroideae
- Tribe: Arethuseae
- Subtribe: Arethusinae
- Genus: Eleorchis; F.Maek.
- Species: E. japonica

Binomial name
- Eleorchis japonica (A.Gray) Maek.

Synonyms
- Arethusa japonica A.Gray; Bletilla japonica (A.Gray) Schltr.; Eleorchis conformis Maek.

= Eleorchis =

Genus of orchids

Eleorchis (Elo in trade journals) is a genus of terrestrial orchids (family Orchidaceae). As of June 2014, it contains only one recognized species, Eleorchis japonica, native to Japan and to the Kuril Islands.
