= Thu =

Thu and variations may refer to:

== Education ==
- Tsinghua University, China
- Tunghai University, Taiwan

== People and characters ==
- Thu (surname), romanisation of Su, and people so named
- Thû (or Sauron), antagonist of J.R.R. Tolkien's legendarium
- Thư, Vietnamese romanization of Shu (surname) (舒)
- Thu, a fictional dog in The Claidi Journals by Tanith Lee

== Places ==
- Thu, Palpa, a village in Nepal
- Pituffik Space Base (IATA:THU)

== Other uses ==
- Thursday (Thu or THU), a day of the week
- Thu (pronoun) (also spelt Þu), in Old English
- Thu., abbreviation for the orchid genus Thunia
