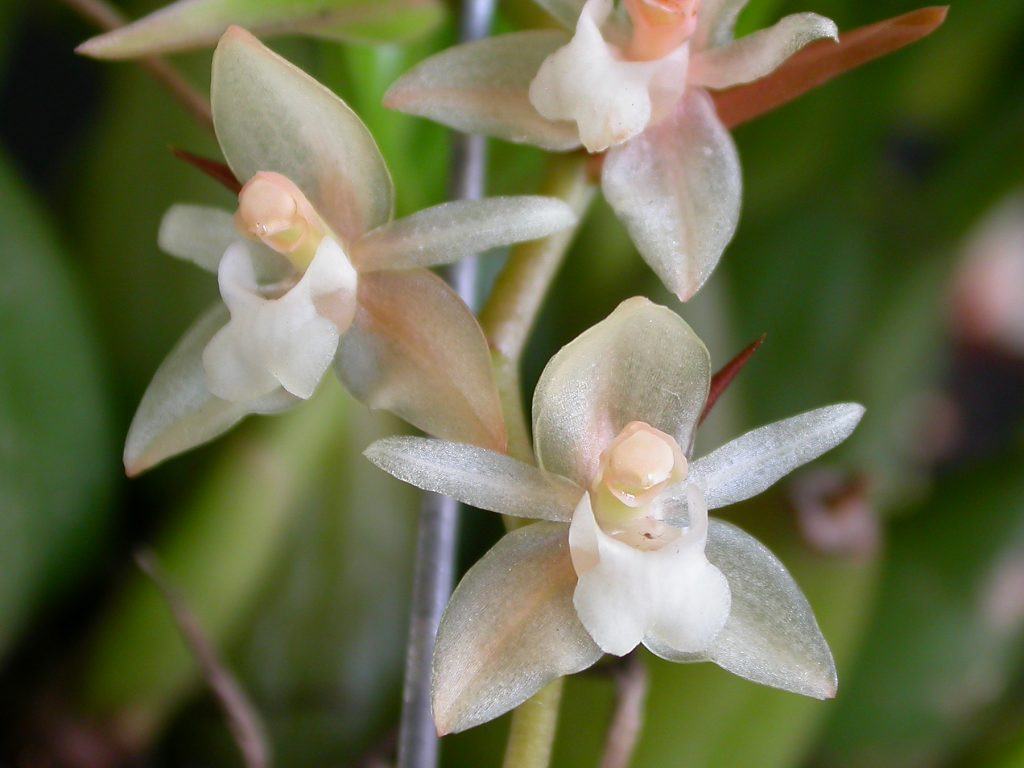
- Pholidota chinensis

Scientific classification
- Kingdom: Plantae
- Clade: Tracheophytes
- Clade: Angiosperms
- Clade: Monocots
- Order: Asparagales
- Family: Orchidaceae
- Subfamily: Epidendroideae
- Tribe: Arethuseae
- Subtribe: Coelogyninae
- Genus: Pholidota; Lindl.

Synonyms
- Ptilocnema D.Don

= Pholidota (plant) =

Genus of orchids

Pholidota, commonly known as rattlesnake orchids, is a genus of flowering plants from the orchid family, Orchidaceae. Plants in this genus are clump-forming epiphytes or lithophytes with pseudobulbs, each with a single large leaf and a large number of small, whitish flowers arranged in two ranks along a thin, wiry flowering stem that emerges from the top of the pseudobulb. There are about thirty five species native to areas from tropical and subtropical Asia to the southwestern Pacific.

== Description ==
Orchids in the genus Pholidota are sympodial epiphytic, lithophytic or, rarely, terrestrial herbs with pseudobulbs, each with one or two large, stalked leathery leaves. A large number of small flowers are arranged in two ranks along a thin, wiry flowering stem that emerges from the top of the pseudobulb. There is a large, papery bract at the base of each flower. The flowers are white, cream-coloured, yellowish or pinkish with a concave dorsal sepal and smaller petals. The labellum is rigidly fixed to the base of the column and there is a deep sac-like structure at its base.

== Distribution ==
Orchids in the genus Pholidota are found in China, Taiwan, the Indian subcontinent, Cambodia, Laos, Myanmar, the Nicobar Islands, Thailand, Vietnam, Borneo, Java, the Lesser Sunda Islands, Peninsular Malaysia, the Maluku Islands, the Philippines, Sulawesi, Sumatra, the Bismarck Archipelago, New Guinea, the Solomon Islands, Queensland (Australia), Fiji, New Caledonia, the Santa Cruz Islands and Vanuatu.

== Taxonomy and naming ==
The genus Pholidota was first formally described in 1825 by John Lindley who published the description in Hooker's Exotic Flora, Containing Figures and Descriptions of New, Rare or Otherwise Interesting Exotic Plants. The name Pholidota is derived from the Ancient Greek word pholidotos meaning "clad in scales", referring to the large bracts at the base of the flower in some species.

=== Species list ===
The following is a list of Pholidota species accepted by the World Checklist of Selected Plant Families as at January 2019:

- Pholidota advena (C.S.P.Parish & Rchb.f.) Hook.f. - Myanmar
- Pholidota aidiolepis Seidenf. & de Vogel - Thailand
- Pholidota articulata Lindl. - Guizhou, Sichuan, Tibet, Yunnan, Assam, Bhutan, Cambodia, India, Indonesia, Laos, Malaysia, Myanmar, Nepal, Thailand, Vietnam
- Pholidota camelostalix Rchb.f. - Sumatra, Java, Bali, Lombok, Timor, Flores
  - Pholidota camelostalix var. camelostalix
  - Pholidota camelostalix var. vaginata (Carr) de Vogel
- Pholidota cantonensis Rolfe - Fujian, Guangdong, Guangxi, Hunan, Jiangxi, Taiwan, Zhejiang.
- Pholidota carnea (Blume) Lindl. - Thailand, Malaysia, Indonesia, Philippines, New Guinea, Bismarcks
  - Pholidota carnea var. carnea
  - Pholidota carnea var. parviflora (Hook.f.) de Vogel
  - Pholidota carnea var. pumila (Ridl.) de Vogel
- Pholidota chinensis Lindl. - Fujian, Guangdong, Guangxi, Guizhou, Hainan, Tibet, Yunnan, Zhejiang, Myanmar, Vietnam
- Pholidota clemensii Ames - Borneo
- Pholidota convallariae (C.S.P.Parish & Rchb.f.) Hook.f. - Yunnan, Assam, Bhutan, Myanmar, Thailand, Vietnam, Java, Sumatra
- Pholidota corniculata Pfitzer & Kraenzl. in H.G.A.Engler - Assam
- Pholidota cyclopetala Kraenzl. in H.G.A.Engler - Sumatra
- Pholidota gibbosa (Blume) Lindl. ex de Vriese - Solomons and much of Indonesia
- Pholidota globosa (Blume) Lindl. - Sumatra, Java, Bali
- Pholidota guibertiae Finet - Vietnam
- Pholidota imbricata Lindl. in W.J.Hooker - widespread from Tibet to Queensland and New Caledonia
- Pholidota katakiana Phukan - Arunachal Pradesh
- Pholidota leveilleana Schltr. - Vietnam, Guangxi, Guizhou, Yunnan
- Pholidota longibulba Holttum - Peninsular Malaysia
- Pholidota longilabra de Vogel - Sumatra
- Pholidota longipes S.C.Chen & Z.H.Tsi - Yunnan
- Pholidota mediocris de Vogel - Borneo
- Pholidota missionariorum Gagnep. - Bhutan, eastern India, Myanmar, Vietnam
- Pholidota nervosa (Blume) Rchb.f. - Sumatra, Java
- Pholidota niana Y.T.Liu, R.Li & C.L.Long - Yunnan
- Pholidota pachyglossa Aver. - Vietnam
- Pholidota pallida Lindl. - Yunnan, Bhutan, Assam, India, Laos, Myanmar, Nepal, Thailand, Vietnam, Cambodia
- Pholidota pectinata Ames - Borneo
- Pholidota pholas Rchb.f. in W.G.Walpers - southeastern China
- Pholidota protracta Hook.f. - Yunnan, Nepal, Assam, Bhutan, Myanmar
- Pholidota pygmaea H.J.Chowdhery & G.D.Pal - Arunachal Pradesh
- Pholidota pyrranthela Gagnep. - Vietnam
- Pholidota recurva Lindl. - Yunnan, Bhutan, Assam, India, Myanmar, Nepal, Thailand, Vietnam
- Pholidota roseans Schltr. - Guizhou, Vietnam
- Pholidota rubra Lindl. - Sikkim, Bhutan, Assam, Vietnam
- Pholidota schweinfurthiana L.O.Williams - Borneo
- Pholidota sigmatochilus J.J.Sm. - Sabah
- Pholidota sulcata J.J.Sm. - Borneo
- Pholidota ventricosa (Blume) Rchb.f. - Vietnam, Malaysia, Indonesia, Philippines, New Guinea
- Pholidota wattii King & Pantl. - Assam
- Pholidota yongii J.J.Wood
- Pholidota yunnanensis Rolfe - Vietnam, Guangxi, Guizhou, Hubei, Hunan, Sichuan, Yunnan
