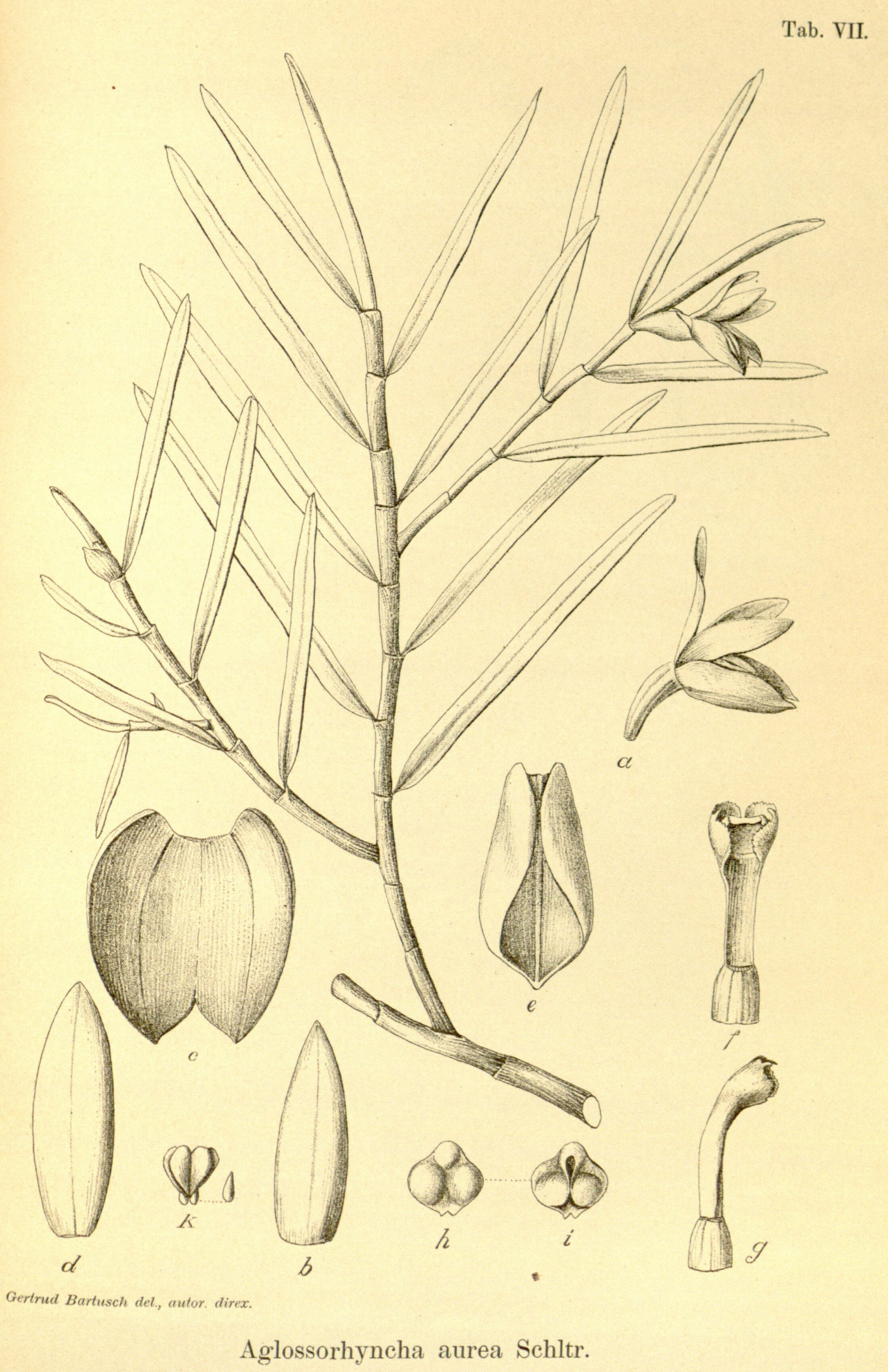
- Illustration of Aglossorrhyncha aurea

Scientific classification
- Kingdom: Plantae
- Clade: Tracheophytes
- Clade: Angiosperms
- Clade: Monocots
- Order: Asparagales
- Family: Orchidaceae
- Subfamily: Epidendroideae
- Tribe: Arethuseae
- Subtribe: Coelogyninae
- Genus: Aglossorrhyncha; Schltr. in K.M.Schumann & C.A.G.Lauterbach

Type species
- Aglossorrhyncha aurea Schltr.

Species
- See text

= Aglossorrhyncha =

Genus of orchids

Aglossorrhyncha is a genus of flowering plants from the orchid family Orchidaceae. It contains 13 currently recognized species, native to eastern Indonesia, New Guinea, and various islands in the Pacific Ocean.

- Aglossorrhyncha aurea Schltr. in K.M.Schumann & C.A.G.Lauterbach - New Guinea, Bismarcks, Solomons
- Aglossorrhyncha biflora J.J.Sm. - Maluku, New Guinea, Solomons, Fiji, Vanuatu
- Aglossorrhyncha bilobula Kores - Fiji
- Aglossorrhyncha fruticicola J.J.Sm. - New Guinea
- Aglossorrhyncha galanthiflora J.J.Sm. - New Guinea
- Aglossorrhyncha jabiensis J.J.Sm. - New Guinea
- Aglossorrhyncha lucida Schltr. - New Guinea
  - Aglossorrhyncha lucida var. dischorensis Schltr.
  - Aglossorrhyncha lucida var. lucida
  - Aglossorrhyncha lucida var. wariana Schltr.
- Aglossorrhyncha micronesiaca Schltr. - Palau
- Aglossorrhyncha peculiaris J.J.Sm. - New Guinea
- Aglossorrhyncha serrulata Schltr. - New Guinea
- Aglossorrhyncha stenophylla Schltr. - New Guinea
- Aglossorrhyncha torricellensis Schltr. - New Guinea
- Aglossorrhyncha viridis Schltr. - New Guinea

== See also ==
- List of Orchidaceae genera
