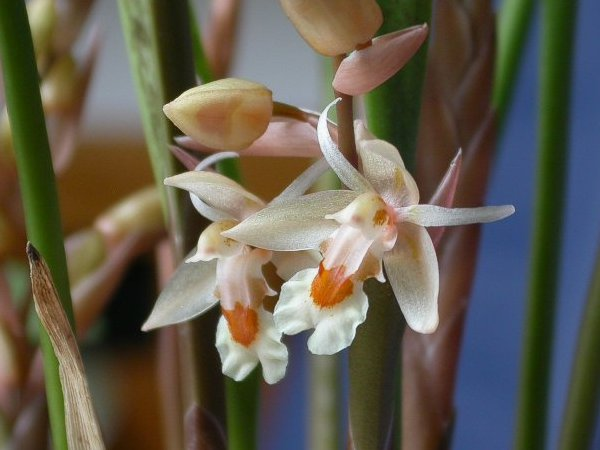

Scientific classification
- Kingdom: Plantae
- Clade: Tracheophytes
- Clade: Angiosperms
- Clade: Monocots
- Order: Asparagales
- Family: Orchidaceae
- Subfamily: Epidendroideae
- Tribe: Arethuseae
- Genus: Chelonistele
- Species: C. sulphurea

Binomial name
- Chelonistele sulphurea (Blume) Pfitzer in H.G.A.Engler (ed.)

Synonyms
- Chelonanthera sulphurea Blume; Coelogyne sulphurea (Blume) Rchb.f.; Pleione sulfurea (Blume) Kuntze; Coelogyne croockewitii Teijsm. & Binn; Pleione croockewitii (Teijsm. & Binn.) Kuntze; Coelogyne pusilla Ridl.; Coelogyne decipiens Sander; Pholidota pusilla (Ridl.) Kraenzl. in H.G.A.Engler (ed.); Coelogyne perakensis Rolfe; Coelogyne beyrodtiana Schltr.; Coelogyne ramosii Ames; Chelonistele perakensis (Rolfe) Ridl.; Chelonistele pusilla (Ridl.) Ridl.; Coelogyne cuneata J.J.Sm.; Coelogyne kutaiensis J.J.Sm.; Coelogyne pinniloba J.J.Sm.; Chelonistele cuneata (J.J.Sm.) Carr; Chelonistele kutaiensis (J.J.Sm.) Carr; Chelonistele pinniloba (J.J.Sm.) Carr

= Chelonistele sulphurea =

Species of orchid

Chelonistele sulphurea is a species of orchid that grows along the Malay Peninsula, Borneo, Sumatra, Java, and Philippines. The plant blooms small, fragrant flowers.

== Varieties ==
Two varieties are recognized:

- Chelonistele sulphurea var. crassifolia (Carr) de Vogel - Sabah
- Chelonistele sulphurea var. sulphurea - Borneo, Java, Malaysia, Sumatra, Philippines
