= Coelogyne bulleyia =

Conservation status
- Endangered (IUCN 3.1)

Scientific classification
- Kingdom: Plantae
- Clade: Tracheophytes
- Clade: Angiosperms
- Clade: Monocots
- Order: Asparagales
- Family: Orchidaceae
- Subfamily: Epidendroideae
- Tribe: Arethuseae
- Subtribe: Coelogyninae
- Genus: Coelogyne
- Species: C. bulleyia

Binomial name
- Coelogyne bulleyia R.Rice

Synonyms
- Bulleyia yunnanensis Schltr.

Genus of orchids

Coelogyne bulleyia is a species of flowering plant in the family Orchidaceae. It is a pseudobulbous epiphyte or lithophyte, growing on tree branches or on rocks on steep hillsides. It is native to the eastern Himalayas of Bhutan, eastern India (Darjeeling, Sikkim, Arunachal Pradesh, and Assam), northwestern and southeastern Yunnan, northern Myanmar, and northern Vietnam.

The species was first described as Bulleyia yunnanensis by Rudolf Schlechter in 1912, who placed it in the monotypic genus Bulleyia. In 2019 the Rod Rice placed the species in genus Coelogyne as Coelogyne bulleyia.
