= Dilochia deleoniae =

Scientific classification
- Kingdom: Plantae
- Clade: Tracheophytes
- Clade: Angiosperms
- Clade: Monocots
- Order: Asparagales
- Family: Orchidaceae
- Subfamily: Epidendroideae
- Tribe: Arethuseae
- Genus: Dilochia
- Species: D. deleoniae

Binomial name
- Dilochia deleoniae D.Tandang & J.Galindon

Species of orchid

Dilochia deleoniae is a species of orchid endemic on Mindanao island in the Philippines. It is the third species of Dilochia known from the Philippines.

Dilochia deleoniae was discovered in 2016 by Danilo Tandang, and it was described in 2020 with the help from researchers from the National Museum of the Philippines, the Botanical Research Institute of Texas (BRIT) and the Philippine Taxonomic Initiative (PTI).
