= Nabaluia clemensii =

Scientific classification
- Kingdom: Plantae
- Clade: Tracheophytes
- Clade: Angiosperms
- Clade: Monocots
- Order: Asparagales
- Family: Orchidaceae
- Subfamily: Epidendroideae
- Tribe: Arethuseae
- Genus: Nabaluia
- Species: N. clemensii

Binomial name
- Nabaluia clemensii Ames 1920

Species of orchid

Nabaluia clemensii is an orchid endemic to Borneo.
