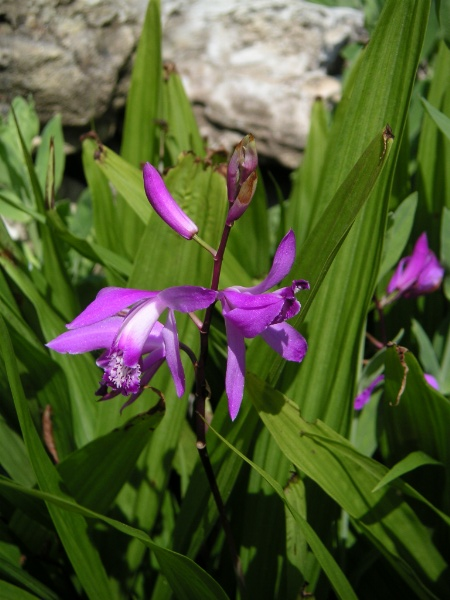
- Bletilla striata

Scientific classification
- Kingdom: Plantae
- Clade: Tracheophytes
- Clade: Angiosperms
- Clade: Monocots
- Order: Asparagales
- Family: Orchidaceae
- Subfamily: Epidendroideae
- Tribe: Arethuseae
- Subtribe: Coelogyninae
- Genus: Bletilla; Rchb.f.

Type species
- Bletilla striata Rchb.

Synonyms
- Jimensia Raf.; Polytoma Lour. ex B.A.Gomes

= Bletilla =

Urn orchid

Genus of orchids

Bletilla, commonly named the urn orchid, is a temperate, terrestrial genus of orchids. The genus currently contains five recognized species distributed through China, Japan, Taiwan, south to Vietnam, Thailand and Myanmar. The name is actually a diminutive of Bletia because of the resemblance between the two genera even though Bletia is a New World genus. The genera Jimensia Raf. and Polytoma Lour. ex Gomes are generally included into Bletilla. This genus is abbreviated Ble in trade journals.

The pseudobulbs resemble spreading corms which usually sit at ground level. Each pseudobulb generally bears several pleated leaves around 40 cm (16 in) long. The racemes of flowers emerge from the center of the years new growth before it is mature, during spring and early summer. The flowers vary in color from white to purple, and all species have four pollinia. The tubers resemble a horn or claw. They are grayish-white or yellowish-white in appearance, with concentric rings and brown rootlets. They have a hard texture and do not break easily.

== Species ==
As of August 2025, five species were accepted:

- Bletilla chartacea (King & Pantl.) Tang & F.T.Wang – Myanmar (Burma)
- Bletilla formosana (Hayata) Schltr. – Gansu, Guangxi, Guizhou, Jiangxi, Shaanxi, Sichuan, Taiwan, Tibet, Yunnan, Nansei-shoto (Ryukyu Islands)
- Bletilla guizhouensis Jie Huang & G.Z.Chen – Guizhou
- Bletilla ochracea Schltr. – Vietnam, Gansu, Guangxi, Guizhou, Henan, Hubei, Hunan, Shaanxi, Sichuan, Yunnan
- Bletilla striata (Thunb.) Rchb.f. – Japan, Korea, Nansei-shoto (Ryukyu Islands), Myanmar (Burma), Anhui, Fujian, Gansu, Guangdong, Guangxi, Guizhou, Hubei, Hunan, Jiangsu, Jiangxi, Shaanxi, Sichuan, Zhejiang

=== Formerly placed here ===
- Mengzia foliosa (King & Pantl.) W.C.Huang, Z.J.Liu & C.Hu (as Bletilla foliosa (King & Pantl.) Tang & F.T.Wang)
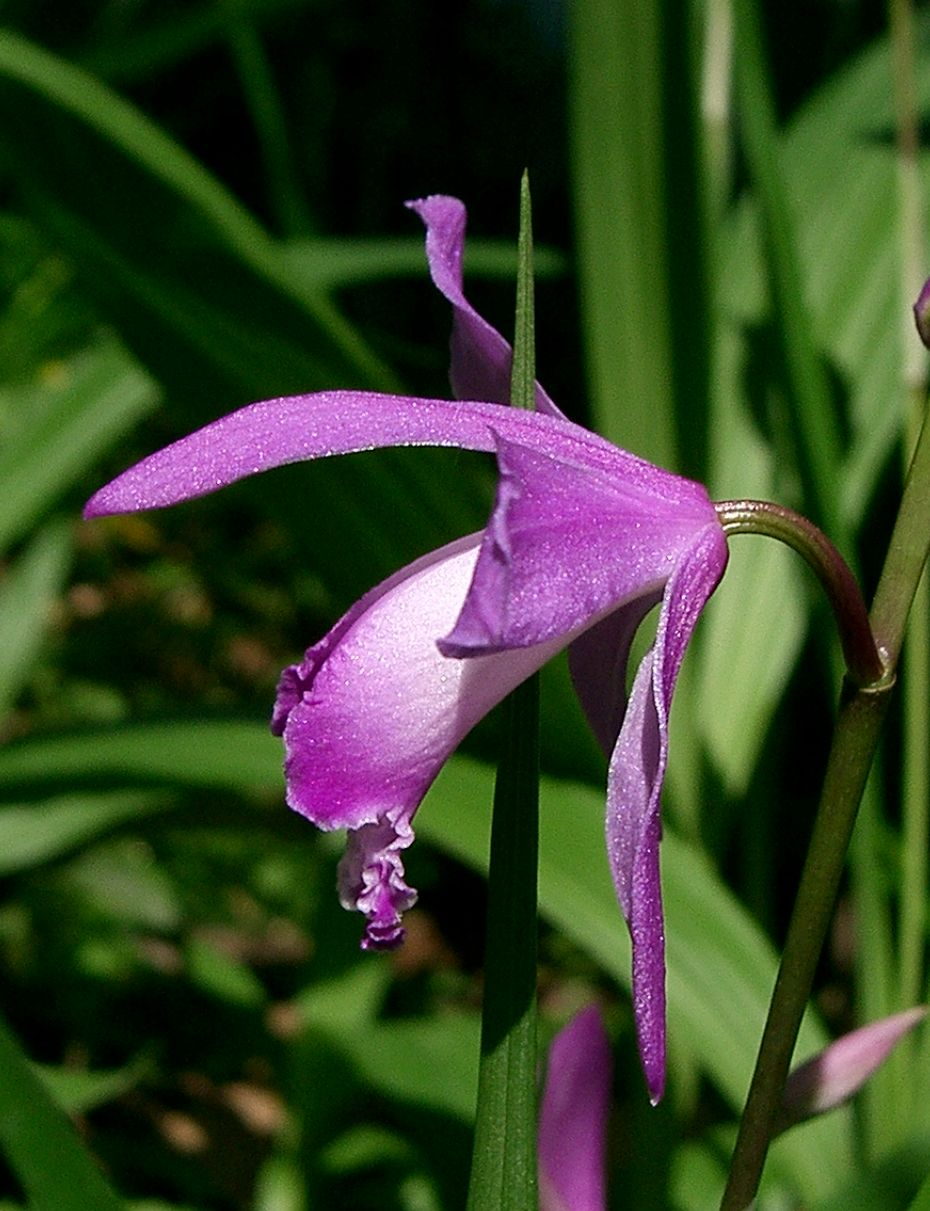
Flower of Bletilla striata

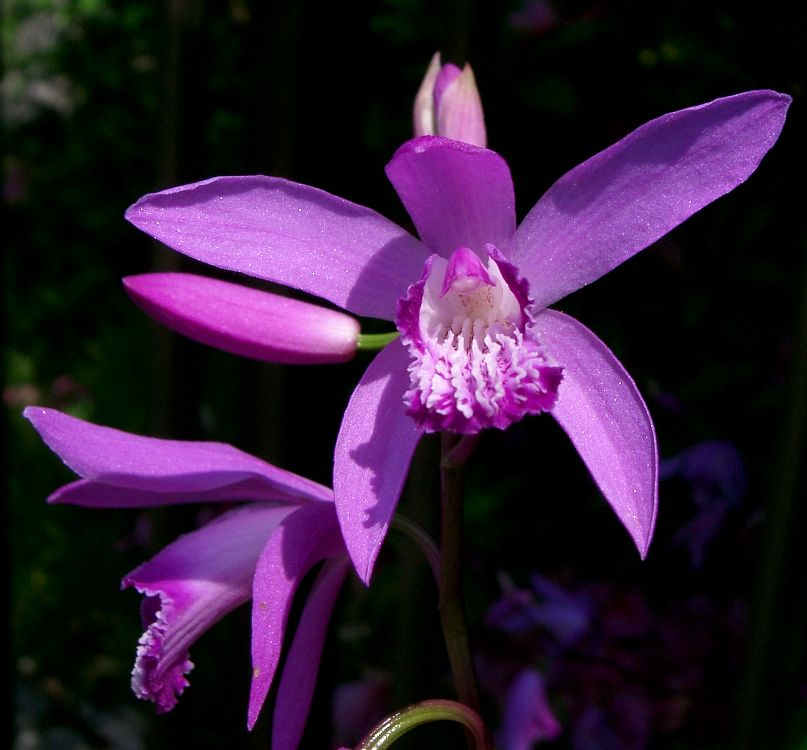
B. striata flower

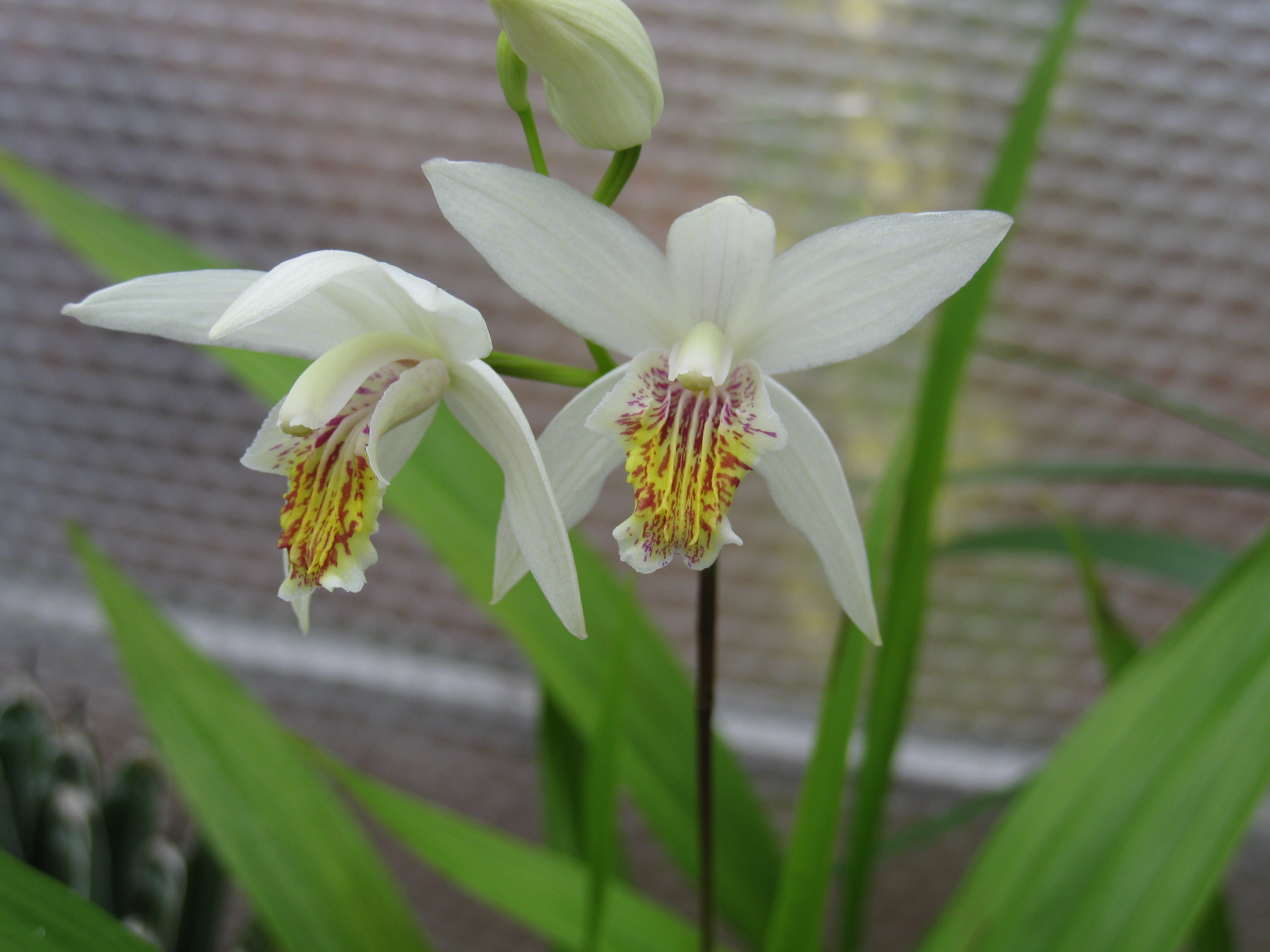
B. striata var. alba

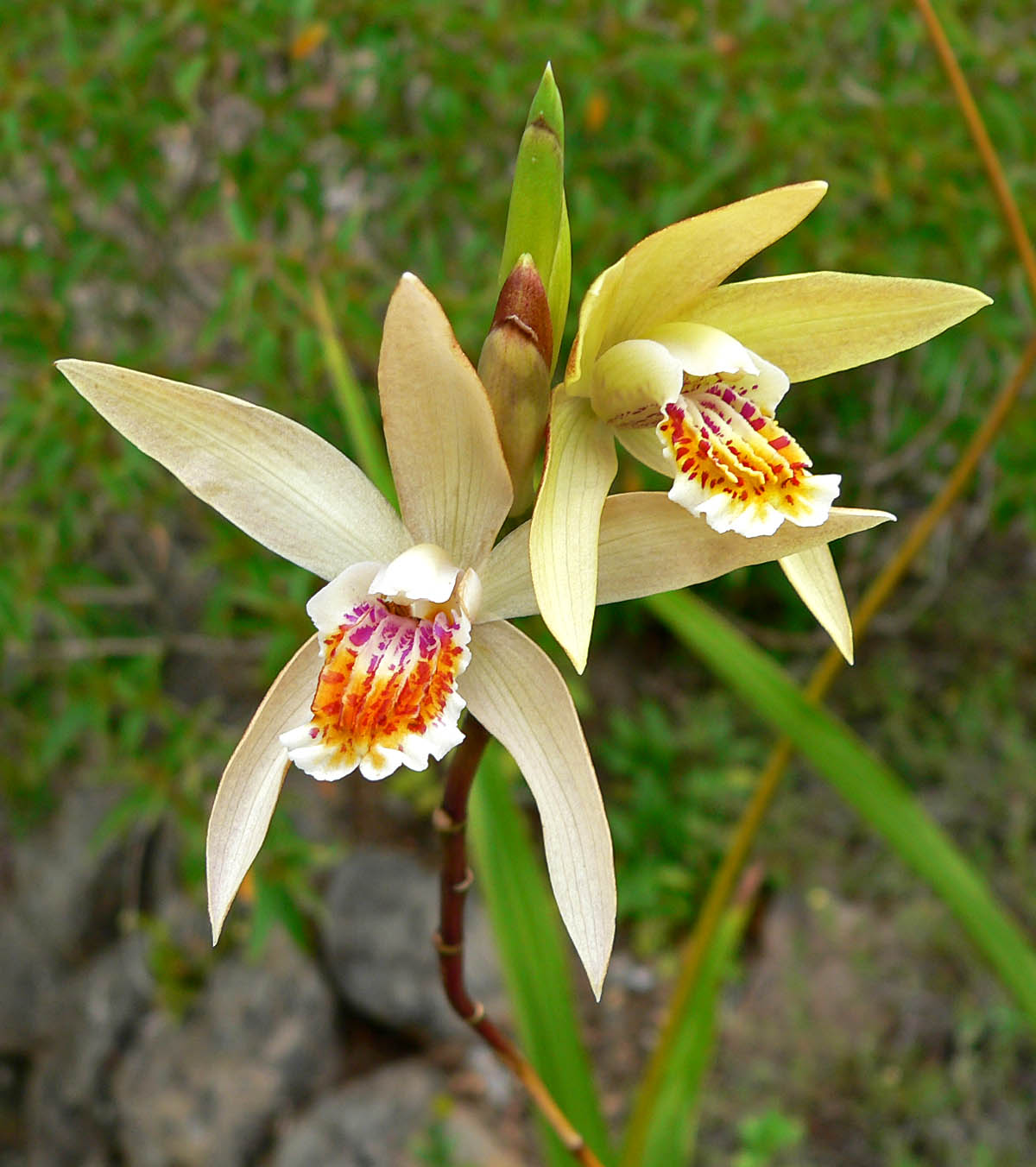
Bletilla ochracea flower

== Cultivation ==
Bletilla species are generally hardy, though some need protection from severely cold frost. It is better to keep them in pots of well-drained media so that water does not sit around the roots during winter when the plants are not actively growing. They should also be watered sparingly at the start of the growing season as the new shoots emerge, as new roots often do not follow for around four weeks afterwards.

Bletilla striata is the most common form found in the nursery trade and is often labeled simply as 'Hardy Orchid' or 'Chinese Ground Orchid' and is quite inexpensive. This beautiful and hardy deciduous orchid has the distinction of being one of the first orchids in cultivation in England dating from around 1794. The very flat knob-like tuberous root system is typically sympodial, expansive and each shoot is of annual duration only. On established plants, almost every new growth shoot has a flower spike before leaves fully develop. Each shoot can have up to fourteen beautiful rose-mauve flowers with a ruffled lip about 30 mm (1.2 in) diameter, scentless and looking something like a miniature Cattleya orchid flower. An established clump can have literally dozens of flower spikes flowering in the late Spring and the clumps only increase in beauty with time. They rarely exceed two feet in height.

The flowers and leaves are at the mercy of late frosts, which are to be avoided if at all possible with coverings of a sheet or newspapers. Resist the temptation to remove the mulch layer even if the new growths are raising up the mulch due to an early Spring, unless no more frosts are likely. Unlike most tropical orchids, B. striata has attractive foliage even when not flowering. The pleated, tapered foliage looks very similar to the juvenile leaves of many palm species. A well established clump of these in flower is quite beautiful and they are surprisingly hardy even into USDA Zone 5 with a heavy mulch. They easily succeed in USDA Zone 6 with only a moderate mulch of straw or leaves. These hardiness ratings only apply to plants in the ground with the idea of preventing the actual root system from being frozen. If potted, they should be placed in a frost-free location if winter temperatures go below freezing. The plant is generally considered hardy without a mulch if minimum winter temperatures do not go below 25 °F.

They have a great reputation of being the absolute easiest orchid for a beginner to grow. Unlike most tropical epiphytic orchids, this plant comes from somewhat temperate zones and grows in soil rather than on trees and require no extraordinary care to grow successfully. They prefer well draining evenly moist soils that are high in organic material and that never dry out nor remain sodden. They are sympodial growers and will form handsome clumps in only a few years. Other species and hybrids are occasionally available, the most common being B. striata var. alba, a white variation of the rose-mauve B. striata. Bletilla ochracea, a somewhat rare species from China has unusual flowers with yellow sepals and petals with a red-marked white lip and is becoming more available to collectors. Bletilla Penway Dragon (formosana × szetschuaunica) appears to be one of the exciting new hybrid grex if it becomes more available.

== Notes ==
- Bown D. Encyclopaedia of Herbs and Their Uses. London: Dorling Kindersley, 1995.
- Feng G, Kramann B, Zheng C, et al. Comparative study on the long-term effect of permanent embolization of hepatic artery with bletilla striata in patients with primary liver cancer. J Tongji Med Univ 1996;16:111-116.
- Yeung, HC. Handbook of Chinese Herbs and Formulas. Los Angeles: Institute of Chinese Medicine, 1985.
- Zheng C, Feng G, Liang H. Bletilla striata as a vascular embolizing agent in interventional treatment of primary hepatic carcinoma. Chin Med J 1998;111:1060-1063.
- Zheng C, Feng G, Zhou R. New use of bletilla striata as embolizing agent in the intervention treatment of hepatic carcinoma. Zhonghua Zhong Liu Za Zhi 1996
