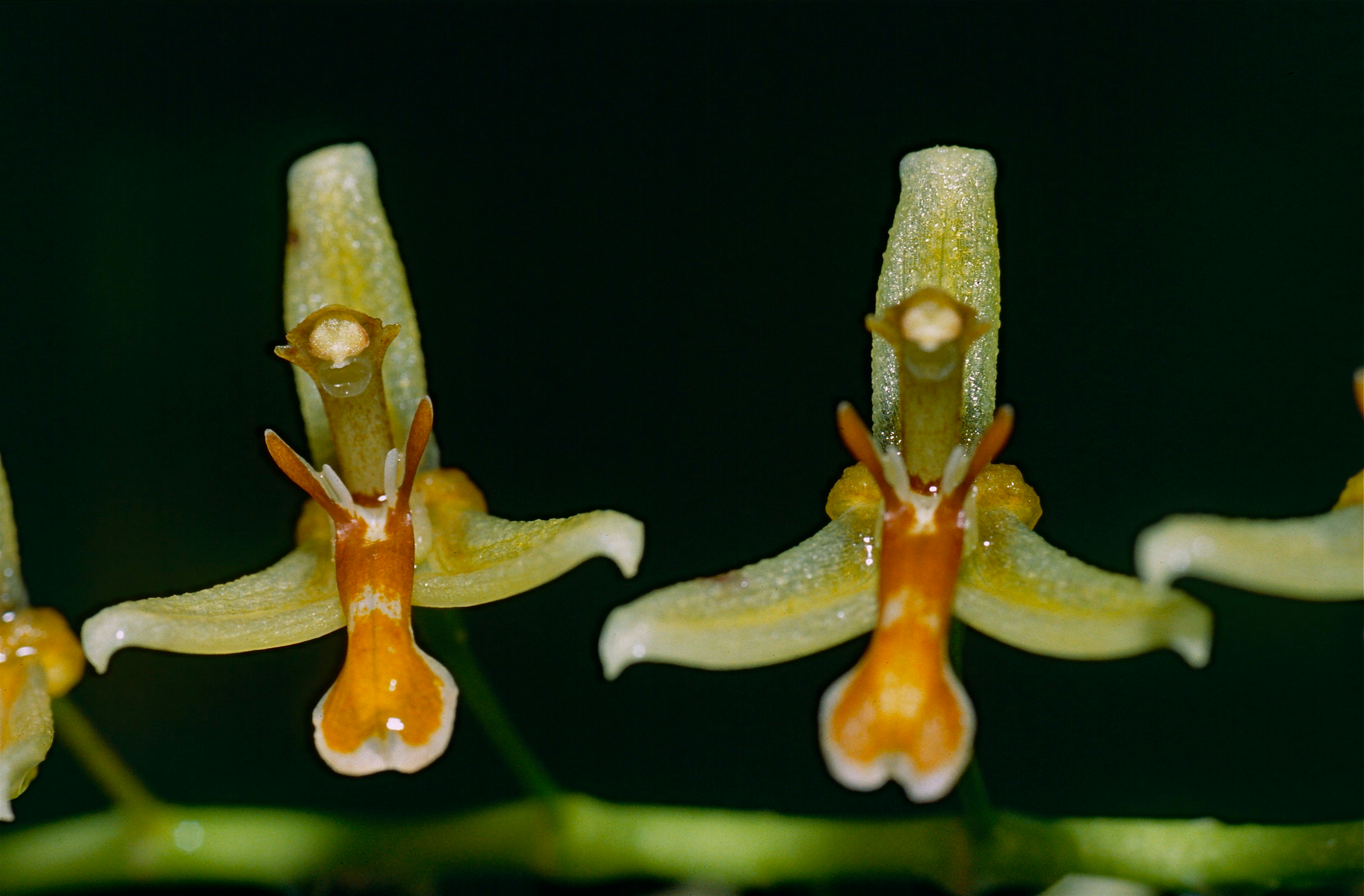
- Nabaluia angustifolia

Scientific classification
- Kingdom: Plantae
- Clade: Tracheophytes
- Clade: Angiosperms
- Clade: Monocots
- Order: Asparagales
- Family: Orchidaceae
- Subfamily: Epidendroideae
- Tribe: Arethuseae
- Subtribe: Coelogyninae
- Genus: Nabaluia; Ames

Type species
- Nabaluia clemensii Ames

= Nabaluia =

Genus of orchids

Nabaluia is a genus of flowering plants from the orchid family, Orchidaceae. It contains 3 known species, all endemic to Borneo.

- Nabaluia angustifolia de Vogel, Blumea 30: 202 (1984) - Sabah, Sarawak
- Nabaluia clemensii Ames, Orchidaceae 6: 71 (1920) - Sabah
- Nabaluia exaltata de Vogel, Blumea 30: 202 (1984) - Sabah, Sarawak

== See also ==
- List of Orchidaceae genera
