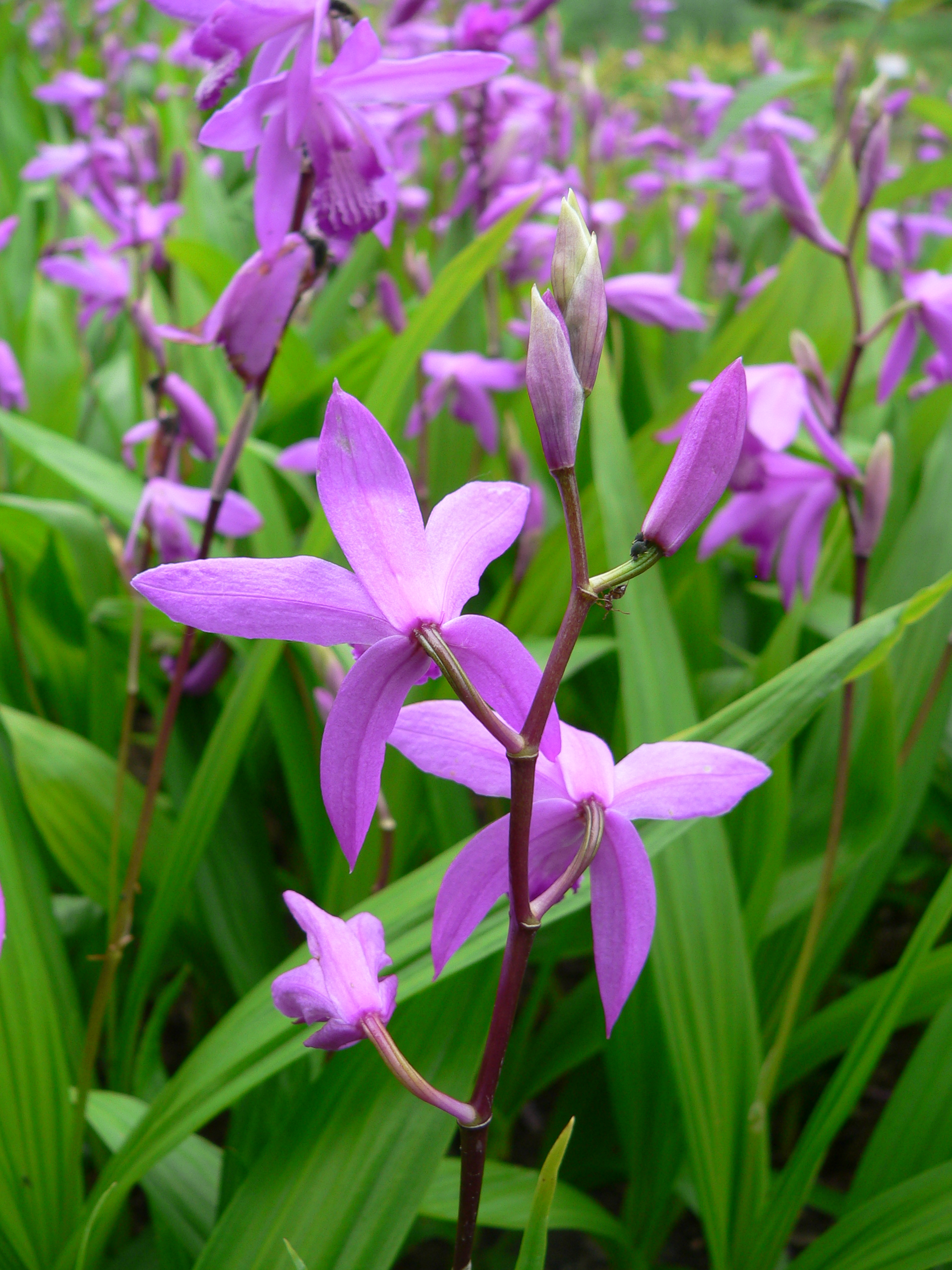

Scientific classification
- Kingdom: Plantae
- Clade: Tracheophytes
- Clade: Angiosperms
- Clade: Monocots
- Order: Asparagales
- Family: Orchidaceae
- Subfamily: Epidendroideae
- Tribe: Arethuseae
- Genus: Bletilla
- Species: B. striata

Binomial name
- Bletilla striata (Thunb.) Rchb.f. (1878)

Synonyms
- Synonyms list: Bletia gebina Lindl. (1847); Bletia hyacinthina (Sm.) Aiton (1813); Bletia hyacinthina var. gebina (Lindl.) Blume (1858); Bletia striata (Thunb.) Druce (1917); Bletilla elegantula (Kraenzl.) Garay & G.A. Romero (1998); Bletilla gebina (Lindl.) Rchb.f. (1853); Bletilla striata f. gebina (Lindl.) Ohwi (1953); Bletilla striata var. albomarginata Makino (1929); Bletilla striata var. gebina (Lindl.) Rchb.f. (1852); Calanthe gebina (Lindl.) Lindl. (1855); Coelogyne elegantula Kraenzl. (1921); Cymbidium hyacinthinum Sm. (1805); Cymbidium striatum (Thunb.) Sw. (1799); Epidendrum striatum (Thunb.) Thunb. (1794); Gyas humilis Salisb. (1812); Jimensia nervosa Raf. (1838); Jimensia striata (Thunb.) Garay & R.E. Schult. (1958); Limodorum hyacinthinum (Sm.) Donn (1807); Limodorum striatum Thunb. (1784) (Basionym); Polytoma inodora Lour. ex Gomes Mach. (1868); Sobralia bletioides Brongn. ex Decne. (1847)

= Bletilla striata =

Species of orchid

Bletilla striata, known as hyacinth orchid or the Chinese ground orchid, is a species of flowering plant in the orchid family Orchidaceae, native to Japan, Korea, Myanmar (Burma), and China (Anhui, Fujian, Gansu, Guangdong, Guangxi, Guizhou, Hubei, Hunan, Jiangsu, Jiangxi, Shaanxi, Sichuan, Zhejiang). It is most commonly found growing in clumps alongside grassy slopes with sandy soil.

The Latin specific epithet striata means "striped", in reference to the ribbed leaves.

== Description ==
Bletilla striata is a terrestrial orchid with pleated, spear-shaped leaves. It breaks dormancy in early spring, with each tuber of the previous year potentially sending out multiple shoots. These growths mature over the course of a couple months and eventually bear 3-7 magenta-pink flowers.

== Cultivation ==
In cultivation in the UK it is hardy in sheltered locations down to −10 °C (14 °F). It has gained the Royal Horticultural Society's Award of Garden Merit.

In the U.S. it may be grown in USDA hardiness zones 5–9, although a winter mulching for plants grown in zone 5 is recommended.

Like most terrestrial orchids, it drops its leaves as it enters winter dormancy; however, it tolerates moisture during this period much better than most others. Nevertheless, it is encouraged to grow Bletilla striata in a well-draining, humus-rich mix.

== Uses ==
Bletilla striata is used in Asian traditional medicine for problems with the lining of the alimentary canal, such as ulcers.

It is also used as a natural glue for making silk strings for traditional Chinese instruments such as the guqin.
