= Panisea yunnanensis =

Conservation status
- Endangered (IUCN 3.1)

Scientific classification
- Kingdom: Plantae
- Clade: Tracheophytes
- Clade: Angiosperms
- Clade: Monocots
- Order: Asparagales
- Family: Orchidaceae
- Subfamily: Epidendroideae
- Tribe: Arethuseae
- Genus: Panisea
- Species: P. yunnanensis

Binomial name
- Panisea yunnanensis S.C.Chen & Z.H.Tsi

Species of orchid

Panisea yunnanensis is a species of plant in the family Orchidaceae. It is native to China (Yunnan Province) and to Vietnam.
