= Ischnogyne =

Scientific classification
- Kingdom: Plantae
- Clade: Tracheophytes
- Clade: Angiosperms
- Clade: Monocots
- Order: Asparagales
- Family: Orchidaceae
- Subfamily: Epidendroideae
- Tribe: Arethuseae
- Subtribe: Coelogyninae
- Genus: Ischnogyne; Schltr.
- Species: I. mandarinorum

Binomial name
- Ischnogyne mandarinorum (Kraenzl.) Schltr.

Synonyms
- Coelogyne mandarinorum Kraenzl.; Pleione mandarinorum (Kraenzl.) Kraenzl. in H.G.A.Engler

Genus of orchids

Ischnogyne is a genus of flowering plants from the orchid family, Orchidaceae. It contains only one known species, Ischnogyne mandarinorum, native to China (provinces of Chongqing, Gansu, Guizhou, Hubei, Shaanxi, Sichuan).

== Size ==
The size of the Ischnogyne averages at about 6.5 centimetres (2.6 in).

== See also ==
- List of Orchidaceae genera
