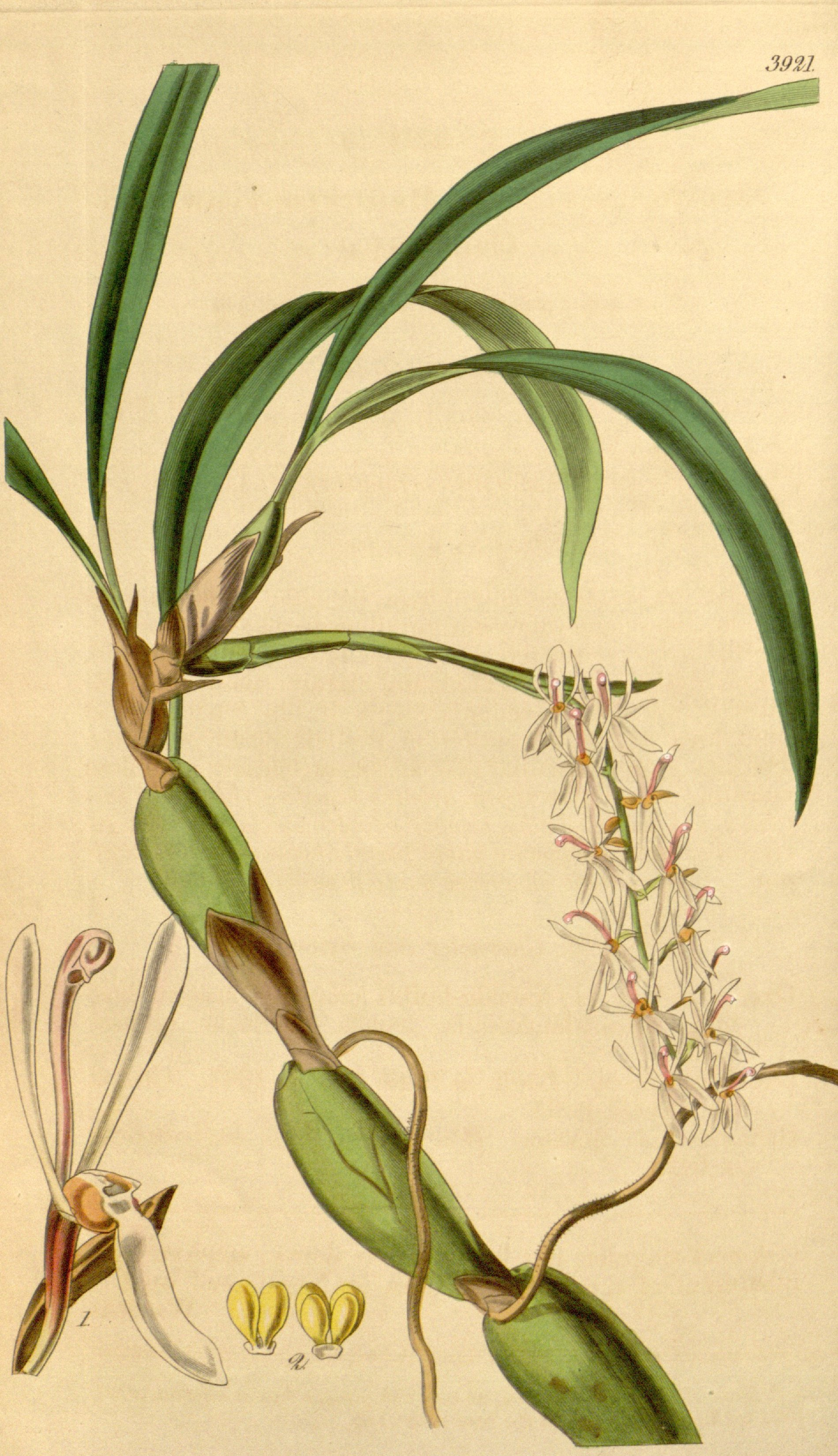
- Otochilus fuscus

Scientific classification
- Kingdom: Plantae
- Clade: Embryophytes
- Clade: Tracheophytes
- Clade: Angiosperms
- Clade: Monocots
- Order: Asparagales
- Family: Orchidaceae
- Subfamily: Epidendroideae
- Tribe: Arethuseae
- Subtribe: Coelogyninae
- Genus: Otochilus; Lindl.

Synonyms
- Broughtonia Wall. ex Lindl., illegitimate homonym; Tetrapeltis Wall. ex Lindl.

= Otochilus =

Genus of orchids

Otochilus is a genus of flowering plants from the orchid family, Orchidaceae. It contains 5 known species, native to China, the Himalayas and Southeast Asia.

- Otochilus albus Lindl. - Tibet, Assam, Bhutan, India, Nepal, Myanmar, Thailand, Vietnam
- Otochilus fuscus Lindl. - Yunnan, Assam, India, Nepal, Bhutan, Indochina
- Otochilus lancilabius Seidenf. - Tibet, Assam, India, Nepal, Bhutan, Laos, Vietnam
- Otochilus porrectus Lindl. - Yunnan, Assam, India, Nepal, Bhutan, Indochina
- Otochilus pseudoporrectus Seidenf. ex Aver. - Vietnam

== See also ==
- List of Orchidaceae genera
