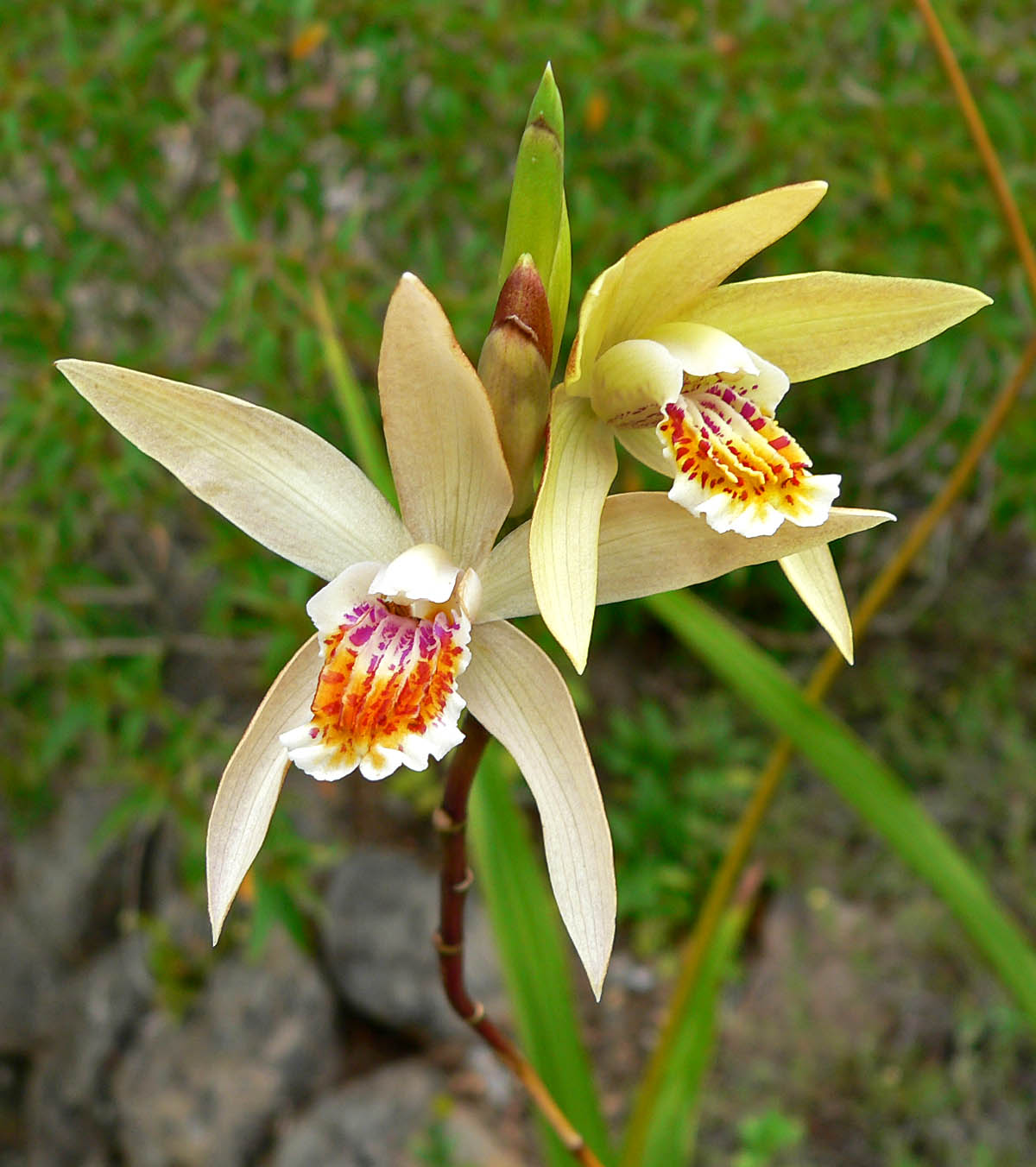

Scientific classification
- Kingdom: Plantae
- Clade: Tracheophytes
- Clade: Angiosperms
- Clade: Monocots
- Order: Asparagales
- Family: Orchidaceae
- Subfamily: Epidendroideae
- Tribe: Arethuseae
- Genus: Bletilla
- Species: B. ochracea

Binomial name
- Bletilla ochracea Schltr. (1913)

Synonyms
- Jimensia ochracea (Schltr.) Garay & R.E. Schult. (1958)

= Bletilla ochracea =

Chinese butterfly orchid

Species of orchid

Bletilla ochracea, commonly known as Chinese butterfly orchid, is a species of orchid native to Vietnam and China (Gansu, Guangxi, Guizhou, Henan, Hubei, Hunan, Shaanxi, Sichuan, Yunnan).
