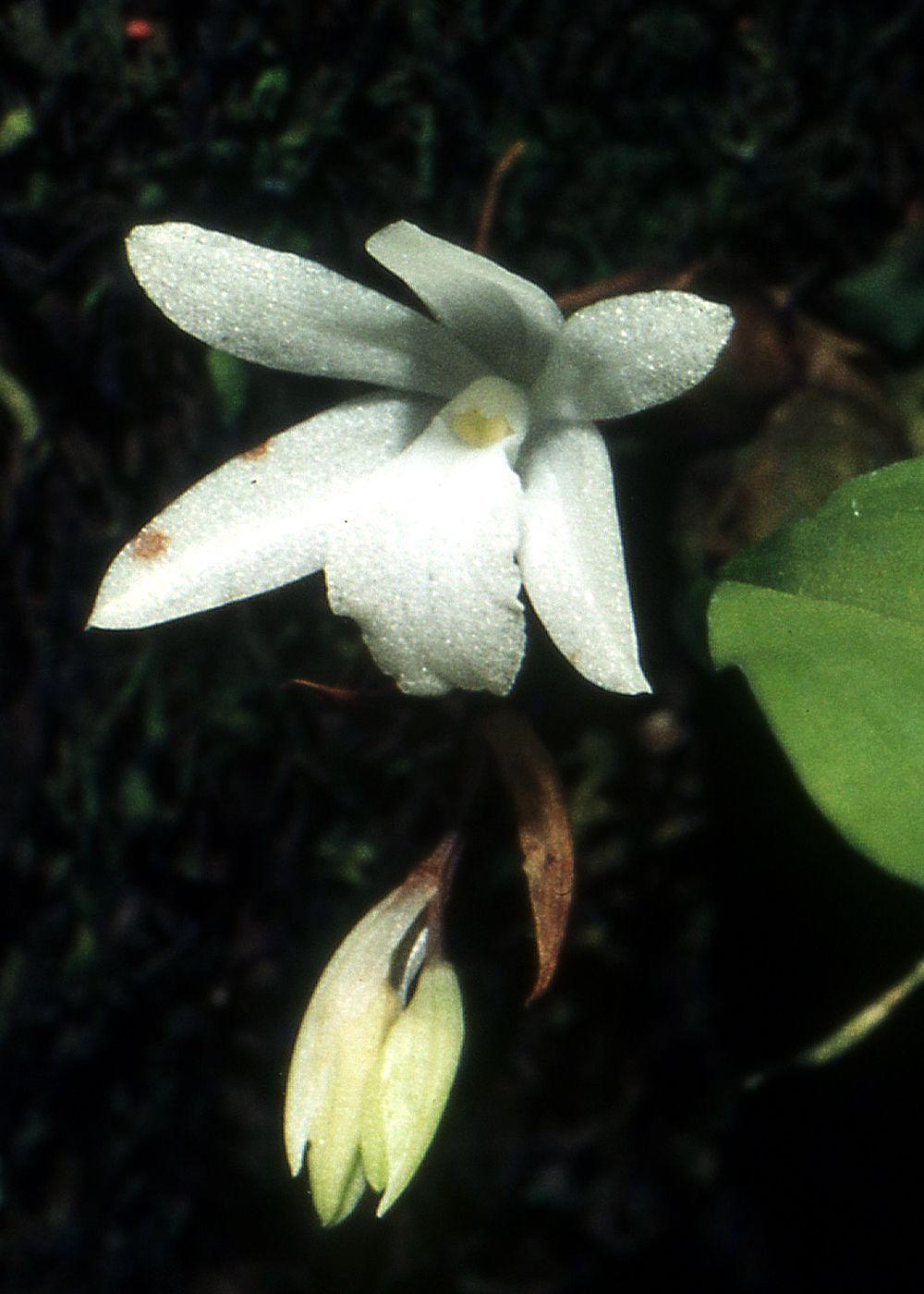

Scientific classification
- Kingdom: Plantae
- Clade: Tracheophytes
- Clade: Angiosperms
- Clade: Monocots
- Order: Asparagales
- Family: Orchidaceae
- Subfamily: Epidendroideae
- Tribe: Arethuseae
- Subtribe: Coelogyninae
- Genus: Dickasonia; L.O.Williams
- Species: D. vernicosa

Binomial name
- Dickasonia vernicosa L.O.Williams

Synonyms
- Kalimpongia Pradhan; Kalimpongia narajitii Pradhan

= Dickasonia =

Genus of orchids

Dickasonia is a genus of flowering plants from the orchid family, Orchidaceae. There is only one known species, Dickasonia vernicosa, which is native to the Himalayas from Darjeeling, through Bhutan and Assam to Myanmar.

== See also ==
- List of Orchidaceae genera
