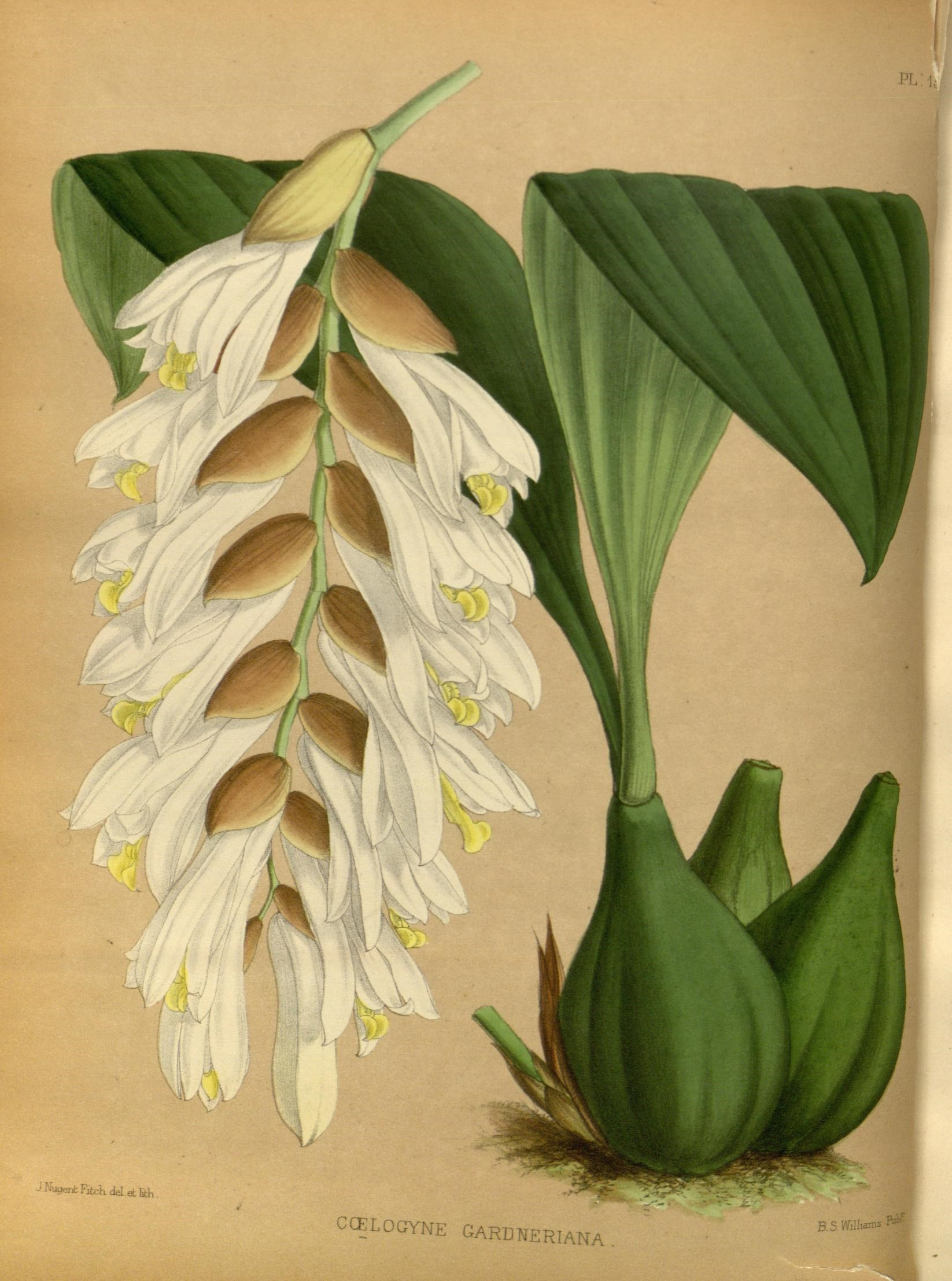

Scientific classification
- Kingdom: Plantae
- Clade: Tracheophytes
- Clade: Angiosperms
- Clade: Monocots
- Order: Asparagales
- Family: Orchidaceae
- Subfamily: Epidendroideae
- Tribe: Arethuseae
- Subtribe: Coelogyninae
- Genus: Neogyna; Rchb.f.
- Species: N. gardneriana

Binomial name
- Neogyna gardneriana (Lindl.) Rchb.f.

Synonyms
- Coelogyne gardneriana Lindl. in N.Wallich; Pleione gardneriana (Lindl.) Kuntze; Coelogyne trisaccata Griff.; Neogyna gardneriana var. basiquinquelamellata Tang & F.T.Wang; Neogyna gardneriana var. basitrilamellata Tang & F.T.Wang

= Neogyna =

Genus of orchids

Neogyna is a genus of flowering plants in the orchid family, Orchidaceae. It contains only one known species, Neogyna gardneriana, native to Tibet, Yunnan, Bhutan, Assam, Laos, Myanmar, Nepal, Thailand, Laos and Vietnam.

== See also ==
- List of Orchidaceae genera
