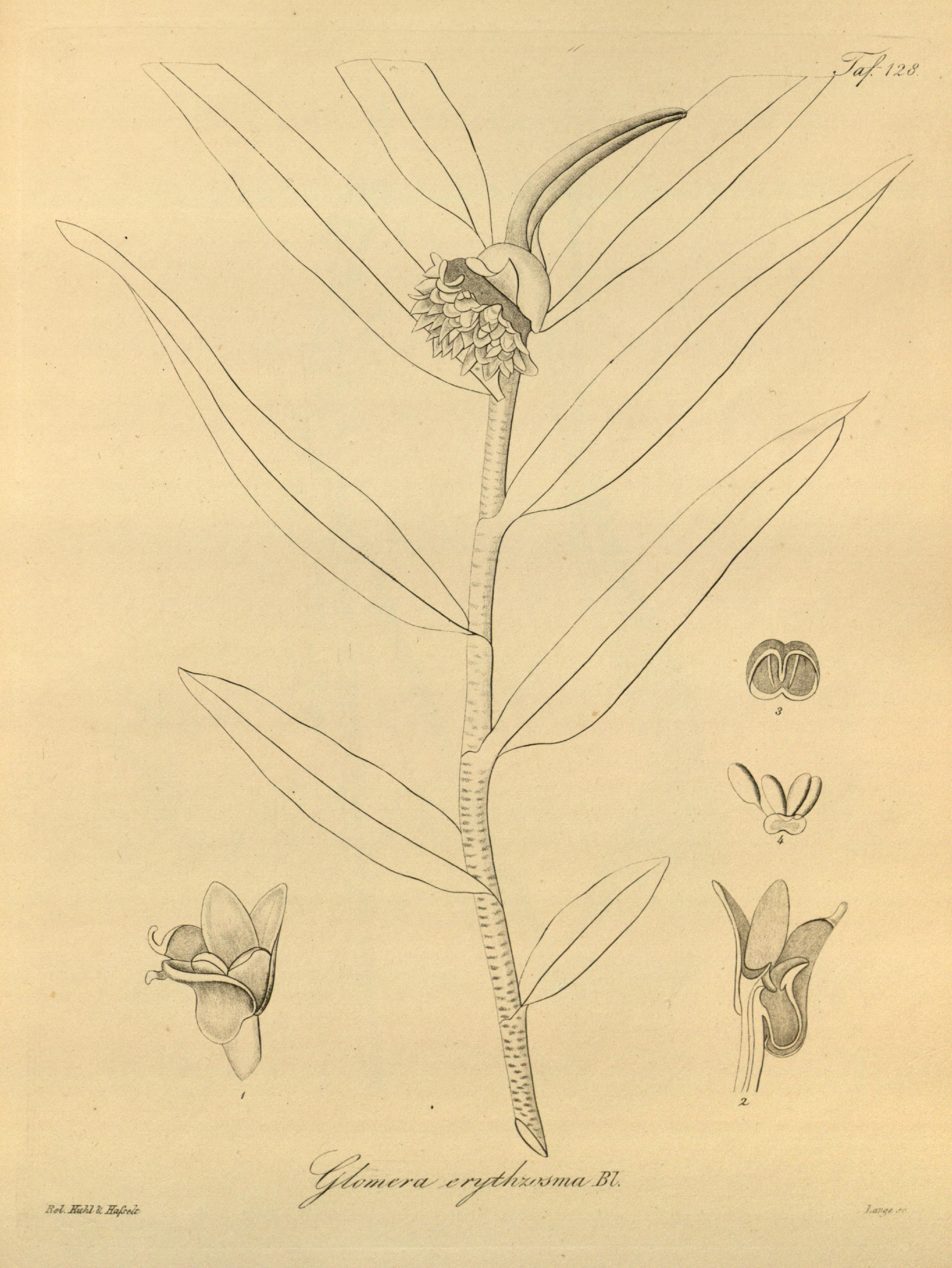
- Glomera erythrosma illustration c 1890

Scientific classification
- Kingdom: Plantae
- Clade: Embryophytes
- Clade: Tracheophytes
- Clade: Angiosperms
- Clade: Monocots
- Order: Asparagales
- Family: Orchidaceae
- Subfamily: Epidendroideae
- Tribe: Arethuseae
- Subtribe: Coelogyninae
- Genus: Glomera; Blume

Synonyms
- Glossorhyncha Ridl.; Giulianettia Rolfe; Ischnocentrum Schltr.; Sepalosiphon Schltr.

= Glomera =

Genus of orchids

Glomera is a genus of orchids (family Orchidaceae), with more than 130 species. They are native to Laos, Indonesia, the Philippines, New Guinea and Melanesia.

The genera Ischnocentrum Schltr. and Sepalosiphon Schltr. are synonyms of this genus.

== Species ==
- Glomera acicularis Schltr. (1912)
- Glomera acuminata J.J.Sm. (1911)
- Glomera acutiflora (Schltr.) J.J.Sm. (1912)
- Glomera adenandroides (Schltr.) J.J.Sm. (1912)
- Glomera adenocarpa (Schltr.) J.J.Sm. (1912)
- Glomera affinis J.J.Sm. (1912)
- Glomera albiviridis P.Royen (1979)
- Glomera amboinensis (Ridl.) J.J.Sm. (1908)
- Glomera angiensis J.J.Sm. (1917)
- Glomera asperata Schltr. (1922)
- Glomera aurea Schltr. (1912)
- Glomera bambusiformis Schltr. (1912)
- Glomera bismarckiensis J.J.Sm. (1912)
- Glomera bougainvilleana Ormerod (1995)
- Glomera brachychaete (Schltr.) J.J.Sm. (1912)
- Glomera brevipetala J.J.Sm. (1911)
- Glomera calocephala Schltr. (1921)
- Glomera carnea J.J.Sm. (1910)
- Glomera carolinensis L.O.Williams (1939)
- Glomera celebica (Schltr.) J.J.Sm. (1912)
- Glomera compressa J.J.Sm. (1911)
- Glomera confusa J.J.Sm. (1912)
- Glomera conglutinata J.J.Sm. (1911)
- Glomera cyatheicola P.Royen (1979)
- Glomera dekockii J.J.Sm. (1911)
- Glomera dentifera J.J.Sm. (1908)
- Glomera dependens (Schltr.) J.J.Sm. (1912)
- Glomera diosmoides (Schltr.) J.J.Sm. (1912)
- Glomera dischorensis (Schltr.) J.J.Sm. (1912)
- Glomera distichifolia Ormerod (1996)
- Glomera dubia J.J.Sm. (1914)
- Glomera elegantula (Schltr.) J.J.Sm. (1908)
- Glomera emarginata Kores (1989)
- Glomera ericifolia Ridl. (1916)
- Glomera erythrosma Blume (1825)
- Glomera flaccida (Schltr.) J.J.Sm. (1912)
- Glomera flammula Schltr. (1912)
- Glomera fransseniana J.J.Sm. (1914)
- Glomera fruticula J.J.Sm. (1911)
- Glomera fruticulosa Schltr. (1912)
- Glomera fusca (Schltr.) J.J.Sm. (1934)
- Glomera gamosepalata P.Royen (1979)
- Glomera geelvinkensis J.J.Sm. (1915)
- Glomera glomeroides (Schltr.) J.J.Sm. (1912)
- Glomera goliathensis J.J.Sm. (1911)
- Glomera graminifolia Schltr. (1922)
- Glomera grandiflora J.J.Sm. (1910)
- Glomera hamadryas (Schltr.) J.J.Sm. (1908)
- Glomera hubrechtiana J.J.Sm. (1929)
- Glomera hunsteiniana (Schltr.) J.J.Sm. (1934)
- Glomera imitans (Schltr.) J.J.Sm. (1912)
- Glomera inconspicua J.J.Sm. (1935)
- Glomera inflata (Schltr.) J.J.Sm. (1934)
- Glomera jabiensis J.J.Sm. (1915)
- Glomera kaniensis Schltr. (1912)
- Glomera kanke P.Royen (1979)
- Glomera keytsiana J.J.Sm. (1913)
- Glomera lancipetala J.J.Sm. (1928)
- Glomera latilinguis J.J.Sm. (1910)
- Glomera latipetala (Schltr.) J.J.Sm. (1912)
- Glomera ledermannii (Schltr.) J.J.Sm. (1934)
- Glomera leucomela (Schltr.) J.J.Sm. (1912)
- Glomera longa (Schltr.) J.J.Sm. (1912)
- Glomera longicaulis J.J.Sm. (1915)
- Glomera macdonaldii (Schltr.) Ames (1933)
- Glomera macrantha J.J.Sm. (1912)
- Glomera macrophylla Schltr. (1922)
- Glomera manicata J.J.Sm. (1910)
- Glomera melanocaulon Schltr. (1912)
- Glomera merrillii Ames 1914)
- Glomera microphylla J.J.Sm. (1914)
- Glomera minutigibba J.J.Sm. (1929)
- Glomera montana Rchb.f. (1876)
- Glomera myrtillus (Schltr.) Schuit. & de Vogel (2003)
- Glomera nana (Schltr.) J.J.Sm. (1912)
- Glomera neohibernica Schltr. (1905)
- Glomera nigrilimbata P.Royen (1979)
- Glomera obovata (Schltr.) J.J.Sm. (1912)
- Glomera obtusa Schltr. (1912)
- Glomera oligantha Schltr. (1919)
- Glomera palustris J.J.Sm. (1911)
- Glomera parviflora J.J.Sm. (1912)
- Glomera patens Schltr. (1922)
- Glomera pensilis (Schltr.) J.J.Sm. (1912)
- Glomera pilifera (Schltr.) J.J.Sm. (1908)
- Glomera platypetala Schltr. (1912)
- Glomera pleiotricha J.J.Sm. (1929)
- Glomera plumosa J.J.Sm. (1928)
- Glomera polychaete (Schltr.) J.J.Sm. (1912)
- Glomera pseudomonanthos Ormerod (2005)
- Glomera pteropetala (Schltr.) J.J.Sm. (1934)
- Glomera pullei J.J.Sm. (1914)
- Glomera pumilio J.J.Sm. (1928)
- Glomera pungens (Schltr.) J.J.Sm. (1912)
- Glomera retusa J.J.Sm. (1910)
- Glomera retusimentum J.J.Sm. (1935)
- Glomera rhombea J.J.Sm. (1911)
- Glomera rigidula J.J.Sm. (1912)
- Glomera rubroviridis J.J.Sm. (1914)
- Glomera saccosepala J.J.Sm. (1911)
- Glomera salicornioides J.J.Sm. (1914)
- Glomera salmonea J.J.Sm. (1914)
- Glomera scandens J.J.Sm. (1911)
- Glomera schlechteriana Mansf. (1929)
- Glomera schultzei Schltr. (1922)
- Glomera secunda J.J.Sm. (1928)
- Glomera sepalosiphon Schuit. & de Vogel (2003)
- Glomera similis J.J.Sm. (1917)
- Glomera sororia J.J.Sm. (1917)
- Glomera squamulosa (Schltr.) J.J.Sm. (1908)
- Glomera stenocentron (Schltr.) J.J.Sm. (1912)
- Glomera subeciliata J.J.Sm. (1929)
- Glomera sublaevis J.J.Sm. (1912)
- Glomera subpetiolata Schltr. (1912)
- Glomera subracemosa J.J.Sm. (1910)
- Glomera subulata (Schltr.) J.J.Sm. (1912)
- Glomera subuliformis J.J.Sm. (1910)
- Glomera tamiana J.J.Sm. (1934)
- Glomera tenuis (Rolfe) J.J.Sm. (1913)
- Glomera terrestris J.J.Sm. (1911)
- Glomera torricellensis Schltr. (1905
- Glomera transitoria J.J.Sm. (1913)
- Glomera triangularis J.J.Sm. (1911)
- Glomera uniflora J.J.Sm. (1908)
- Glomera verrucifera Schltr. (1912)
- Glomera verrucosissima (Schltr.) J.J.Sm. (1934)
- Glomera verruculosa (Schltr.) J.J.Sm. (1912)
- Glomera versteegii J.J.Sm. (1914)
- Glomera viridis (Schltr.) J.J.Sm. (1912)
