= Gynoglottis =

Scientific classification
- Kingdom: Plantae
- Clade: Tracheophytes
- Clade: Angiosperms
- Clade: Monocots
- Order: Asparagales
- Family: Orchidaceae
- Subfamily: Epidendroideae
- Tribe: Arethuseae
- Subtribe: Coelogyninae
- Genus: Gynoglottis; J.J.Sm.
- Species: G. cymbidioides

Binomial name
- Gynoglottis cymbidioides (Rchb.f.) J.J.Sm.

Genus of orchids

Gynoglottis is a genus of flowering plants endemic to Sumatra from the orchid family, Orchidaceae, containing one species, Gynoglottis cymbidioides.

== See also ==
- List of Orchidaceae genera
