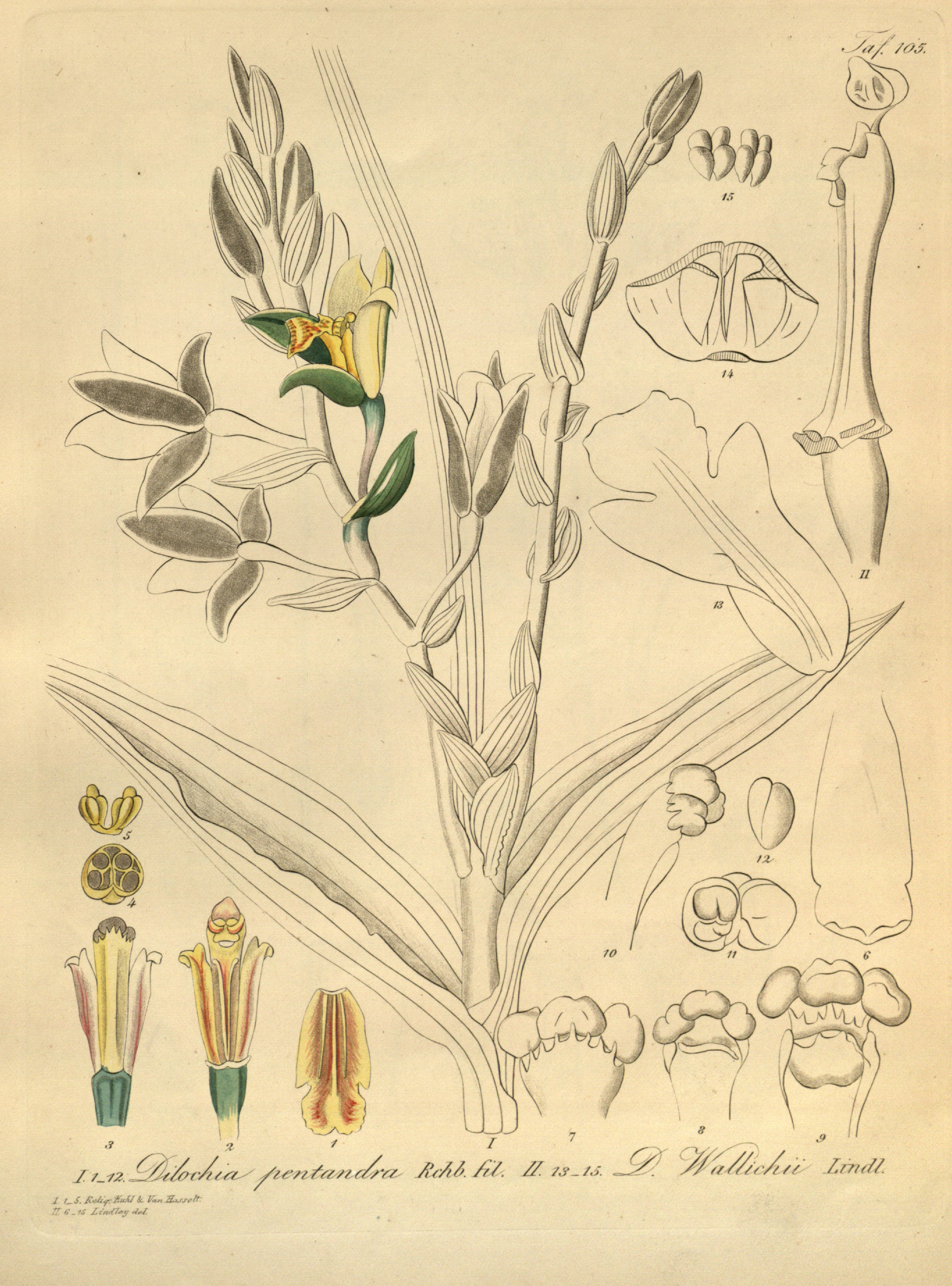
- Dilochia wallichii (as syn. Dilochia pentandra)

Scientific classification
- Kingdom: Plantae
- Clade: Tracheophytes
- Clade: Angiosperms
- Clade: Monocots
- Order: Asparagales
- Family: Orchidaceae
- Subfamily: Epidendroideae
- Tribe: Arethuseae
- Subtribe: Coelogyninae
- Genus: Dilochia; Lindl.

Synonyms
- Dilochus Miq.

= Dilochia =

Genus of orchids

Dilochia is a genus of flowering plants from the orchid family, Orchidaceae. It contains 8 known species, native to Southeast Asia and New Guinea.

- Dilochia beamanii Ormerod - Borneo(Sabah)
- Dilochia cantleyi (Hook.f.) Ridl. - Indonesia, New Guinea
- Dilochia carnosa Sulist. - Indonesia(Sumat(e)ra)
- Dilochia celebica (Schltr.) Schltr. - Sulawesi
- Dilochia deleoniae Tandang & Galindon - Philippines
- Dilochia elmeri Ames - Philippines
- Dilochia longilabris J.J.Sm. - Sulawesi, Borneo
- Dilochia parviflora J.J.Sm. - Borneo
- Dilochia rigida (Ridl.) J.J.Wood - Sabah
- Dilochia subsessilis (Rolfe) S.Thomas - Myanmar
- Dilochia wallichii Lindl. - Thailand, Malaysia, Indonesia, New Guinea, Philippines

== See also ==
- List of Orchidaceae genera
