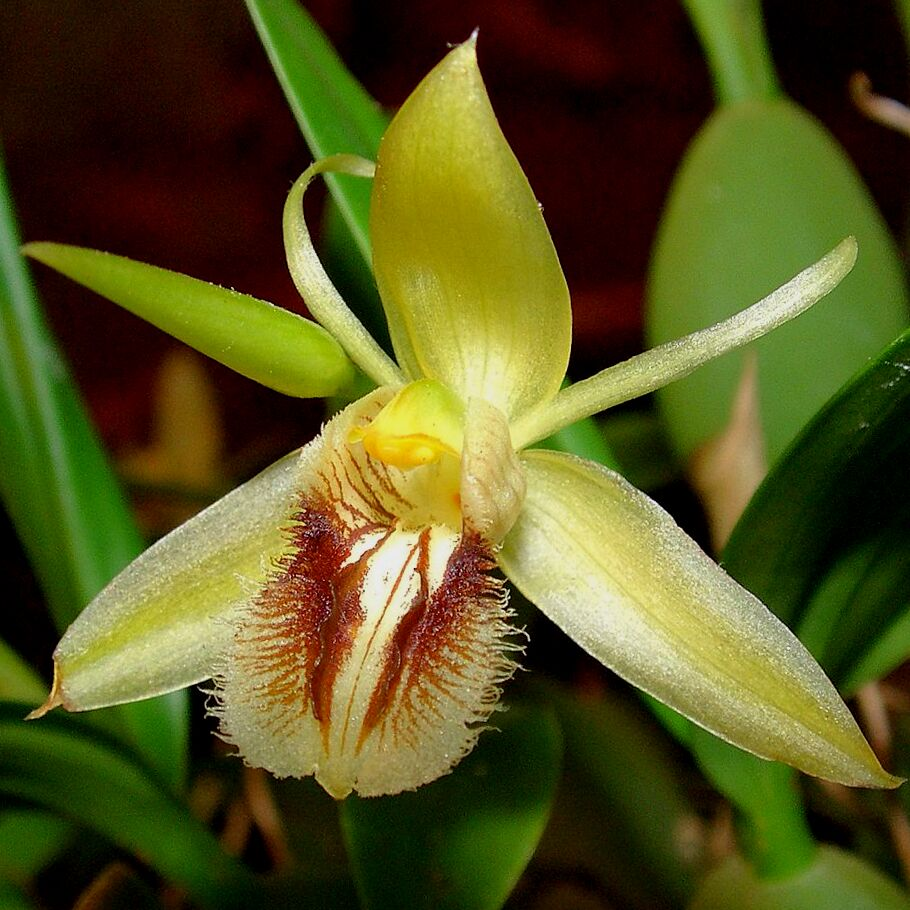
- Coelogyne fimbriata - flower

Scientific classification
- Kingdom: Plantae
- Clade: Tracheophytes
- Clade: Angiosperms
- Clade: Monocots
- Order: Asparagales
- Family: Orchidaceae
- Subfamily: Epidendroideae
- Tribe: Arethuseae
- Subtribe: Coelogyninae; Benth., J. Linn. Soc., Bot. 18: 287. (1881)

Genera
- Aglossorrhyncha; Bletilla; Bracisepalum; Bulleyia; Chelonistele; Coelogyne; Dendrochilum; Dickasonia; Dilochia; Entomophobia; Geesinkorchis; Glomera; Gynoglottis; Ischnogyne; Nabaluia; Neogyna; Otochilus; Panisea; Pholidota; Pleione; Thunia

= Coelogyninae =

Subtribe of orchids

The Coelogyninae are an orchid subtribe in the tribe Arethuseae.

== Nothogenera ==
Crosses between species in different genera within this subtribe are placed in the following nothogenera (i.e., hybrid genera):

- Coeleione (Coeln.) = Coelogyne × Pleione
- Pleionilla (Plnl.) = Bletilla × Pleione
- Thunilla (Tnl.) = Bletilla × Thunia

== See also ==
- Taxonomy of the Orchidaceae
