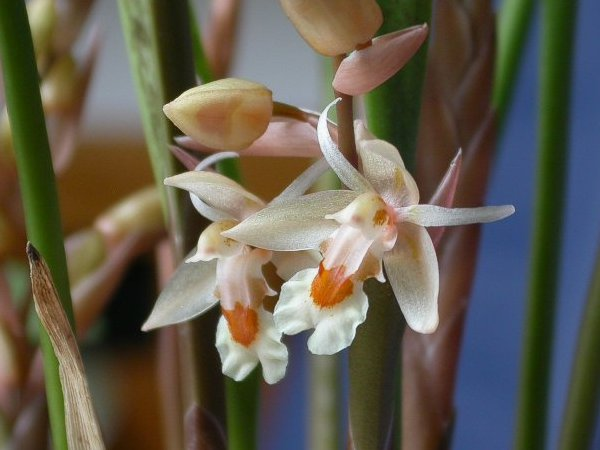
- Chelonistele sulphurea

Scientific classification
- Kingdom: Plantae
- Clade: Tracheophytes
- Clade: Angiosperms
- Clade: Monocots
- Order: Asparagales
- Family: Orchidaceae
- Subfamily: Epidendroideae
- Tribe: Arethuseae
- Subtribe: Coelogyninae
- Genus: Chelonistele; Kraenzl.

Synonyms
- Sigmatochilus Rolfe

= Chelonistele =

Genus of orchids

Chelonistele is a genus of the orchid family consisting of 13 currently accepted species. It is native to Indonesia, Malaysia and the Philippines. The plant grows as an epiphytic or lithophytic orchid.

The genus name of Anzia is named after Chelone (Greek mythology), a mountain nymph.

The genus was circumscribed by Ernst Hugo Heinrich Pfitzer in Das Pflanzenreich (Engler) IV. 50 IIB (Heft 32) on page 136 in 1907.

== known species ==
As accepted as by Plants of the World Online (about 14),

- Chelonistele amplissima (Ames & C.Schweinf.) Carr - Borneo
- Chelonistele brevilamellata (J.J.Sm.) Carr - Kalimantan
- Chelonistele dentifera de Vogel - Sarawak
- Chelonistele devogelii Schuit. - Sarawak
- Chelonistele ingloria (J.J.Sm.) Carr - Borneo
- Chelonistele laetitia-reginae de Vogel - Sarawak
- Chelonistele lamellulifera Carr - NW. Borneo
- Chelonistele lurida Pfitzer in H.G.A.Engler (ed.) - Borneo
- Chelonistele maximae-reginae de Vogel, Vugt, M.Perry, E.Winkel & Hoogend. - Sabah
- Chelonistele ramentacea J.J.Wood - Sarawak
- Chelonistele richardsii Carr - Sarawak, Brunei
- Chelonistele senagangensis J.J.Wood - Sabah
- Chelonistele sulphurea (Blume) Pfitzer in H.G.A.Engler (ed.)
  - Chelonistele sulphurea var. crassifolia (Carr) de Vogel - Sabah
  - Chelonistele sulphurea var. sulphurea - Borneo, Java, Malaysia, Sumatra, Philippines
- Chelonistele unguiculata Carr - Sarawak, Brunei
