= Entomophobia kinabaluensis =

Scientific classification
- Kingdom: Plantae
- Clade: Tracheophytes
- Clade: Angiosperms
- Clade: Monocots
- Order: Asparagales
- Family: Orchidaceae
- Subfamily: Epidendroideae
- Tribe: Arethuseae
- Subtribe: Coelogyninae
- Genus: Entomophobia de Vogel
- Species: E. kinabaluensis

Binomial name
- Entomophobia kinabaluensis (Ames) de Vogel

Synonyms
- Pholidota kinabaluensis Ames

Species of orchid

Entomophobia is a genus of flowering plants from the orchid family, Orchidaceae. Only one species is known, Entomophobia kinabaluensis, endemic to the Island of Borneo. The epithet "kinabaluensis" refers to Mount Kinabalu in Sabah.

== See also ==
- List of Orchidaceae genera
