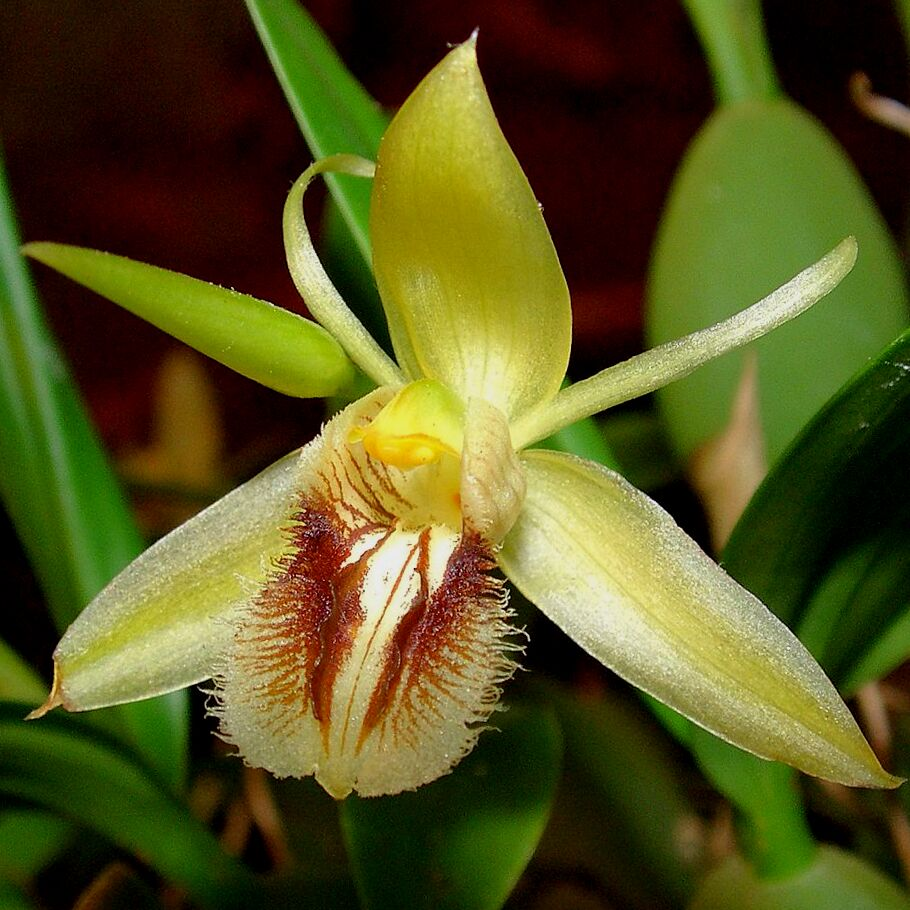

Scientific classification
- Kingdom: Plantae
- Clade: Embryophytes
- Clade: Tracheophytes
- Clade: Spermatophytes
- Clade: Angiosperms
- Clade: Monocots
- Order: Asparagales
- Family: Orchidaceae
- Subfamily: Epidendroideae
- Tribe: Arethuseae
- Genus: Coelogyne
- Species: C. fimbriata

Binomial name
- Coelogyne fimbriata Lindl. (1825)

Synonyms
- Pleione fimbriata (Lindl.) Kuntze (1891); Broughtonia linearis Wall. ex Lindl. (1830); Coelogyne fuliginosa Lodd. ex Hook. (1849); Coelogyne longiciliata Teijsm. & Binn. (1864); Broughtonia linearis Wall. ex Hook.f. (1890); Pleione chinensis Kuntze (1891); Pleione fuliginosa (Lodd. ex Hook.) Kuntze (1891); Coelogyne pallens Ridl. (1903); Coelogyne chrysotropis Schltr. (1911); Coelogyne padangensis J.J. Sm. & Schltr. (1911); Coelogyne fimbriata var. annamica Finet ex Gagnep. (1919); Coelogyne laotica Gagnep. (1930); Coelogyne xerophyta Hand.-Mazz. (1936); Coelogyne leungiana S.Y. Hu (1972); Coelogyne primulina Barretto (1990); Coelogyne arunachalensis H.J. Chowdhery & G.D. Pal (1997)

= Coelogyne fimbriata =

Species of orchid

Coelogyne fimbriata is a species of epiphytic, occasionally lithophytic, orchid native to South and Southeast Asia.

== Description ==
Coelogyne fimbriata is a medium-sized, cool- to hot-growing epiphyte, occasionally found as a lithophyte in narrow limestone crevices, with ovoid to ellipsoid pseudobulbs spaced about 3–4 cm apart along a creeping rhizome. Each pseudobulb bears a pair of apical, oblong-elliptic, plicate, five-nerved leaves narrowing gradually below into a petiolate base. The inflorescence arises from the newest mature pseudobulb, typically in autumn, as a slender, erect, zig-zagged (fractiflex) rachis around 4–5 cm long subtended by a narrow basal sheath, bearing one to three fragrant, long-lived flowers with a musk-to-yeast-like scent. Coelogyne fimbriata has a clonal, spreading ("phalanx-type") growth habit, forming extensive colonies via its creeping rhizomes on rocks and tree trunks within forests or at forest margins.

== Distribution and habitat ==
It occurs in the Himalayas, Nepal, China, Cambodia, Thailand, Laos, and Myanmar. It grows epiphytic on trees in lower montane forests at an altitude of 900 to 1500 meters above sea level.

== Taxonomy ==
The species was first described by John Lindley in 1825, who named it Coelogyne fimbriata and gave it the English name "Fringed Coelogyne", in Edwards's Botanical Register. The species has accumulated a large number of synonyms over subsequent decades, reflecting repeated independent description of populations across its wide range; these include Coelogyne laotica Gagnep. (1930), Coelogyne xerophyta Hand.-Mazz. (1936) and Coelogyne primulina Barretto (1990), all now treated as synonyms by Kew. Within the traditional sectional classification of Coelogyne, the species is placed in section Fuliginosae.

== Ecology ==
Coelogyne fimbriata is one of only two orchid species known to have food-deceptive flowers pollinated exclusively by eusocial worker wasps, the other being Steveniella satyrioides. A 2009 study found that its fragrant, nectarless flowers are pollinated solely by female wasps of a single Vespula species, which are drawn to the floral odour; despite this specialised relationship, fruit set in the species is consistently low, apparently because of self-incompatibility combined with a tendency for pollen to be deposited on genetically identical clone-mates via the plant's spreading rhizome growth.

== Cultivation ==
In cultivation, Coelogyne fimbriata is generally regarded as an easy, free-flowering miniature species suited to mounting on cork or slabs with a layer of sphagnum moss, or to pot or basket culture in a small-bark or bark-and-sphagnum mix; its compact size also makes it popular for terrarium growing. It is a seasonal grower, requiring a short winter rest with restricted watering after new growths mature in autumn; watering frequency is gradually increased again as new roots begin to appear in spring, alongside a rise in daytime temperature. The species prefers bright, shaded conditions without direct sunlight.

== Pharmacology ==
As part of a 2021 study examining whether antimicrobial activity is phylogenetically clustered across the subtribe Coelogyninae ("necklace orchids"), Wati and colleagues tested ethanolic leaf and pseudobulb extracts of Coelogyne fimbriata — alongside the related species Coelogyne cristata — against a panel of human bacterial pathogens. Leaf extracts of C. fimbriata inhibited the growth of Bacillus cereus, Staphylococcus aureus and Yersinia enterocolitica in vitro, confirming antimicrobial activity for the species; extracts from plants cultivated outdoors showed somewhat stronger activity than those from plants grown indoors, a difference the authors suggested might reflect environmentally induced variation in phytochemical content. The same assay conditions produced no inhibition zones for C. cristata pseudobulb extracts, highlighting that antimicrobial activity in this study was species-specific rather than a general property of the genus.

More broadly, the study built a molecular phylogeny of 148 Coelogyninae species from nuclear ribosomal ITS and plastid matK sequence data and mapped historical, published records of traditional medicinal use onto it, finding that antimicrobial use among necklace orchids was significantly clustered by phylogenetic relatedness rather than randomly distributed across the group.
