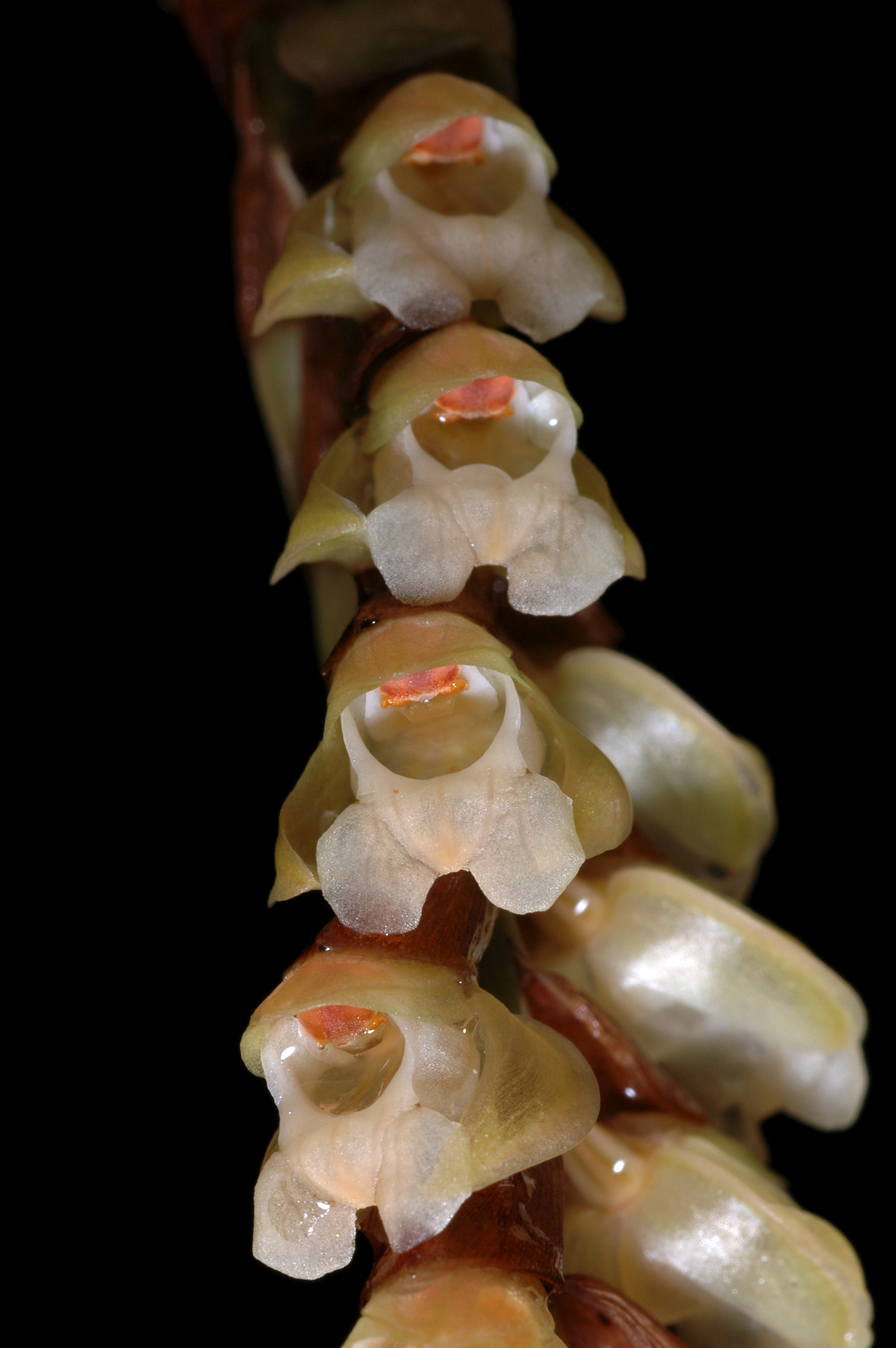

Scientific classification
- Kingdom: Plantae
- Clade: Embryophytes
- Clade: Tracheophytes
- Clade: Angiosperms
- Clade: Monocots
- Order: Asparagales
- Family: Orchidaceae
- Subfamily: Epidendroideae
- Tribe: Arethuseae
- Genus: Coelogyne
- Species: C. imbricata

Binomial name
- Coelogyne imbricata (Hook.) Rchb.f.

Synonyms
- List: Cymbidium imbricatum (Lindl.) Roxb.; Pholidota imbricata Hook.; Coelogyne conchoidea (Lindl.) Rchb.f.; Coelogyne crotalina (Rchb.f.) Rchb.f.; Coelogyne loricata (Rchb.f.) Rchb.f.; Coelogyne triotos (Rchb.f.) Rchb.f.); Ornithidium imbricatum Wall. ex Lindl.; Pholidota assamica Regel; Pholidota beccarii Schltr.; Pholidota bracteata (D.Don) Seidenf.; Pholidota calceata Rchb.f.; Pholidota conchoidea Lindl.; Pholidota crotalina Rchb.f.; Pholidota grandis Kraenzl. nom. illeg.; Pholidota henryi Kraenzl.; Pholidota imbricata var. coriacea Hook.f.; Pholidota imbricata var. henryi (Kraenzl.) Tang & F.T.Wang; Pholidota imbricata var. longifolia Schltr.; Pholidota imbricata var. montana Schltr.; Pholidota imbricata var. papuana J.J.Sm.; Pholidota imbricata var. platyphylla Schltr.; Pholidota loricata Rchb.f.; Pholidota spectabilis Kraenzl. ex Guillaumin; Pholidota triotos Rchb.f.; Ptilocnema bracteata D.Don

= Coelogyne imbricata =

Common rattlesnake orchid

Species of orchid

Coelogyne imbricata, commonly known as the common rattlesnake orchid or necklace orchid, is a plant in the orchid family and is a clump-forming epiphyte or lithophyte with crowded pseudobulbs. Each pseudobulb has a single pleated, leathery leaf and up to sixty white, cream-coloured or greenish, cup-shaped flowers in two ranks along a wiry flowering stem. There is a large, papery bract at the base of each flower. This species is native to areas from tropical and subtropical Asia to the southwest Pacific.

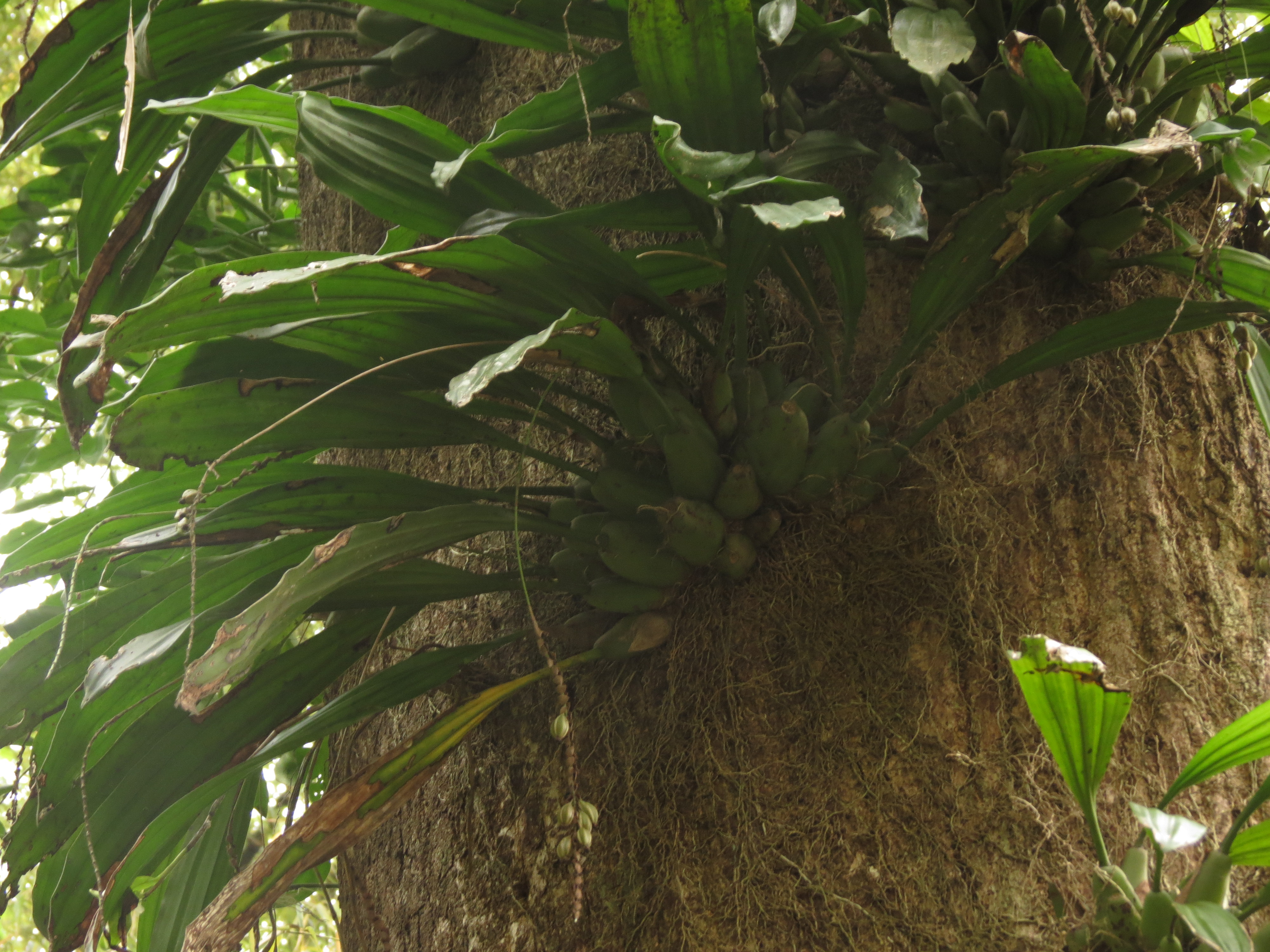
Habit in Thattekad Bird Sanctuary

== Description ==
Coelogyne imbricata is an epiphytic or lithophytic, clump forming herb with crowded pseudobulbs 80–120 mm (3.1–4.7 in) long and 30–50 mm (1.2–2.0 in) wide. Each pseudobulb has a single pleated, leathery, dark green, oblong to lance-shaped leaf 200–400 mm (7.9–16 in) long and 60–80 mm (2.4–3.1 in) wide on a stalk about 50 mm (2.0 in) long. Between twenty and sixty cup-shaped, white, cream-coloured or greenish resupinate flowers 6–8 mm (0.24–0.31 in) long and 5–7 mm (0.20–0.28 in) wide are arranged in two rows along a wiry flowering stem 150–400 mm (5.9–16 in) long. There is a large, concave pinkish bract at the base of each flower. The dorsal sepal is 4–5 mm (0.16–0.20 in) long and 3–4 mm (0.12–0.16 in) wide, the lateral sepals 6–7 mm (0.24–0.28 in) long and about 3 mm (0.12 in) wide. The petals are 3–4 mm (0.12–0.16 in) long and about 1.5 mm (0.059 in) wide. The labellum is about 4 mm (0.16 in) long and 5 mm (0.20 in) wide and concave with three lobes. The side lobes are erect and the midlobe is divided again into three lobes. Flowering occurs between March and May.

== Taxonomy and naming ==
This species of orchid was first formally described in 1825 by William Jackson Hooker who published the description in Exotic Flora. In 1861, Heinrich Gustav Reichenbach transferred the species to the genus Coelogyne as C. imbricata. The specific epithet (imbricata) is a Latin word meaning "overlapping like roofing-tiles and shingles".

== Distribution and habitat ==
The common rattlesnake orchid usually grows on trees and rocks in rainforest, sometimes in other humid, sheltered places. It occurs in China, the Indian subcontinent, Cambodia, Laos, Myanmar, the Nicobar Islands, Thailand, Vietnam, Borneo, Java, the Lesser Sunda Islands, Peninsular Malaysia, the Maluku Islands, the Philippines, Sulawesi, Sumatra, the Bismarck Archipelago, New Guinea, the Solomon Islands, Queensland, Fiji, New Caledonia, the Santa Cruz Islands and Vanuatu. In Queensland it is found on some Torres Strait Islands and on the Cape York Peninsula as far south as Townsville.
