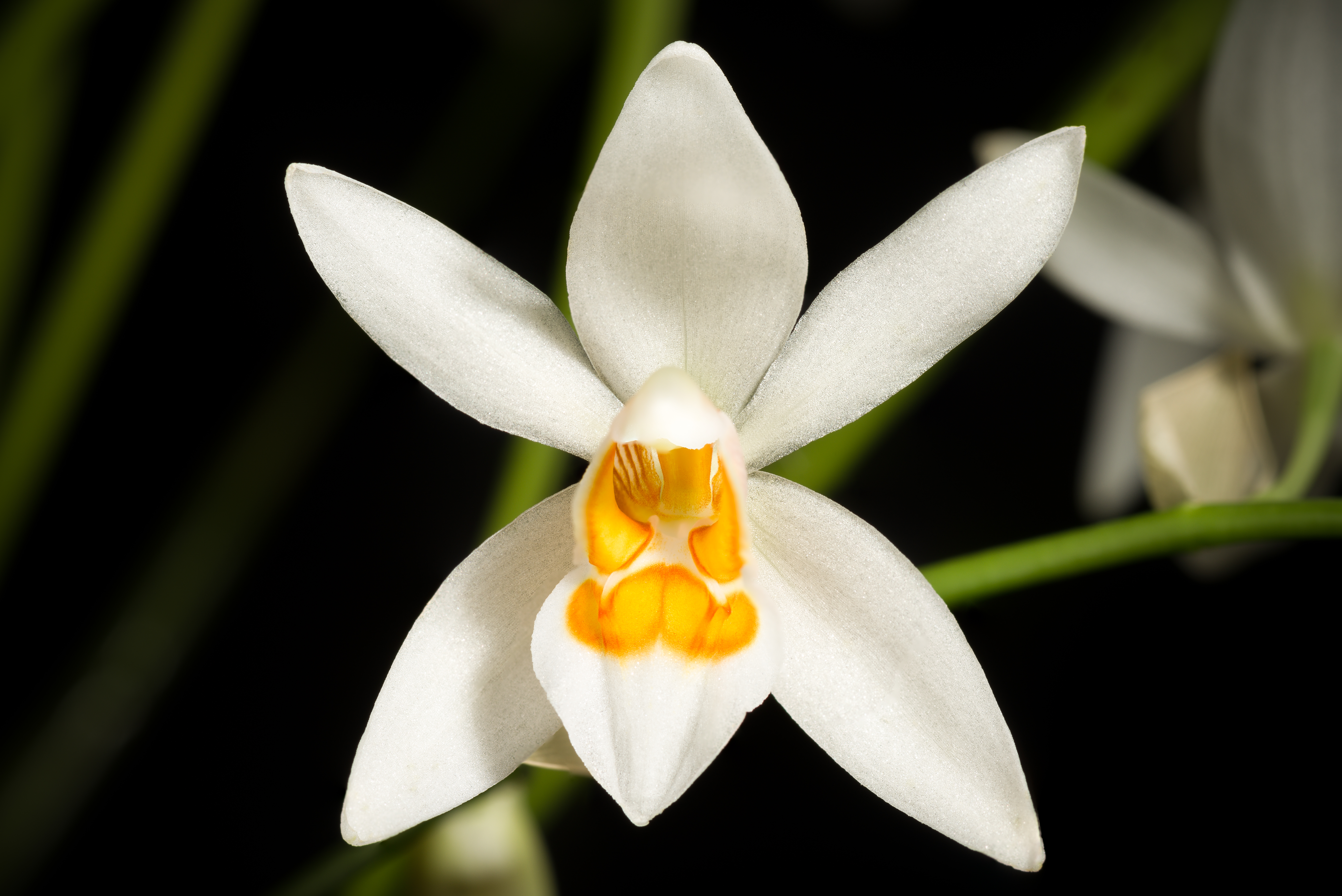

Scientific classification
- Kingdom: Plantae
- Clade: Tracheophytes
- Clade: Angiosperms
- Clade: Monocots
- Order: Asparagales
- Family: Orchidaceae
- Subfamily: Epidendroideae
- Tribe: Arethuseae
- Genus: Coelogyne
- Species: C. nitida

Binomial name
- Coelogyne nitida (Wall. ex D.Don) Lindl.

= Coelogyne nitida =

Species of orchid

Coelogyne nitida is a species of orchid in the Coelogyne genus.

Coelogyne nitida is a cool-growing species originating in the Himalayan region of India and southeast Asia. It requires a decided rest period during winter during which it receives no feed, very little water (enough to prevent pseudobulbs shrivelling), cool to cold temperatures and high light. These conditions seem to aid flowering in spring for some growers, though others report that more constant conditions can also produce regular flowering.
