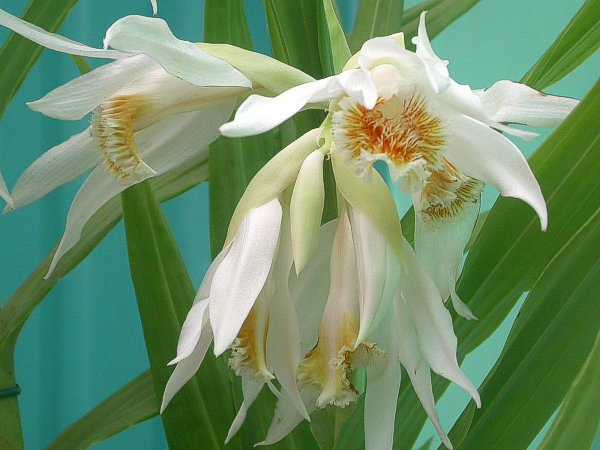
- Thunia alba

Scientific classification
- Kingdom: Plantae
- Clade: Tracheophytes
- Clade: Angiosperms
- Clade: Monocots
- Order: Asparagales
- Family: Orchidaceae
- Subfamily: Epidendroideae
- Tribe: Arethuseae
- Subtribe: Coelogyninae
- Genus: Thunia; Rchb.f. (1852)

Species
- Thunia alba; Thunia bensoniae; Thunia majorensis; Thunia marshalliana; Thunia pulchra; Thunia venosa; Thunia winniana; Hybrids; Thunia gattonensis majorensis × winniana; Thunia veitchiana bensoniae × marshalliana; Thunia wrigleyana unknown parentage

= Thunia =

Genus of orchids

Thunia is a genus of orchids (family Orchidaceae). It is now included in the subtribe Coelogyninae, but was previously treated as the only genus of the subtribe Thuniinae. The genus comprises several species, native to Southeast Asia. It is abbreviated Thu in trade journals.
