= Thu, Palpa =

Thu थु
- Village development committee
- Country: Nepal
- Zone: Lumbini Zone
- District: Palpa District

Population (1991)
  - Total: 3,511
- Time zone: UTC+5:45 (Nepal Time)

Thu is a village development committee in Palpa District in the Lumbini Zone of southern Nepal. At the time of the 1991 Nepal census it had a population of 3511 people living in 683 individual households.
