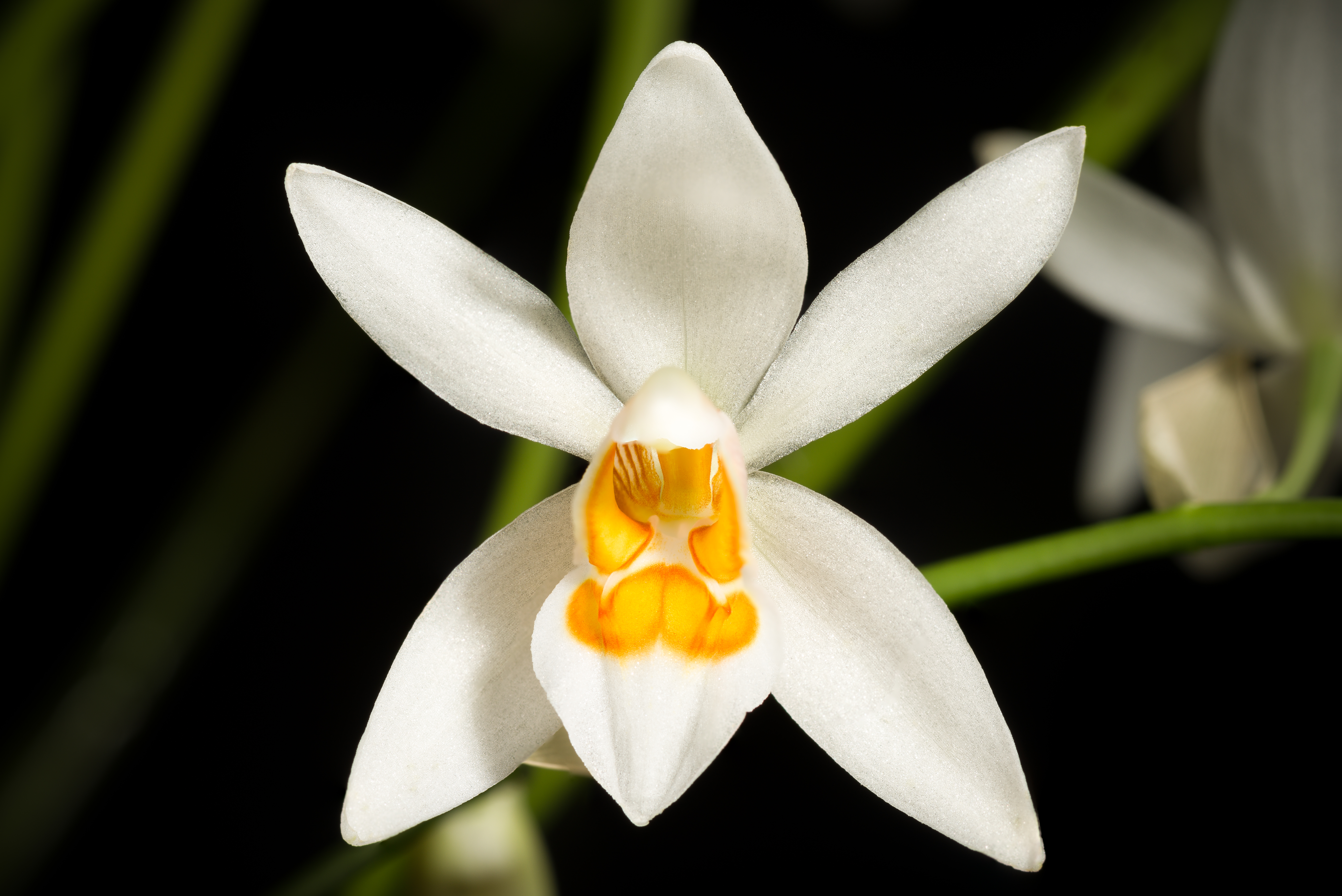
- Coelogyne nitida

Scientific classification
- Kingdom: Plantae
- Clade: Tracheophytes
- Clade: Angiosperms
- Clade: Monocots
- Order: Asparagales
- Family: Orchidaceae
- Subfamily: Epidendroideae
- Tribe: Arethuseae; Lindl., Orchid. Scelet. 7, 10. (1826)

Subtribes
- Arethusinae; Coelogyninae

Synonyms
- Glomereae Pfitzer (1887) as Glomerinae Entw. Nat. Anordn. Orch., 101 (1887)

= Arethuseae =

Tribe of orchids

Arethuseae is a mid-sized tribe of orchids in the subfamily Epidendroideae. This tribe was initially categorized by John Lindley in 1840. Its largest subtribes are Arethusinae and Coelogyninae.

Bletiinae was once considered a subtribe of Arethuseae, but it was moved to Epidendreae in 2005. Sobraliinae has been considered a subtribe of Arethuseae, but is now recognized at the rank of tribe within the subfamily Epidendroideae. The genus Thunia has been considered to be the only genus in the subtribe Thuniinae, but is now included in the subtribe Coelogyninae.

== See also ==
- Taxonomy of the Orchidaceae
