= Praecox =

Praecox is a Latin term meaning "very early". It is often used as a qualifying adjective in Latin binomials, and could mean "early flowering", "primitive", "premature" or "early onset" (in the case of medical conditions).

== Plants ==
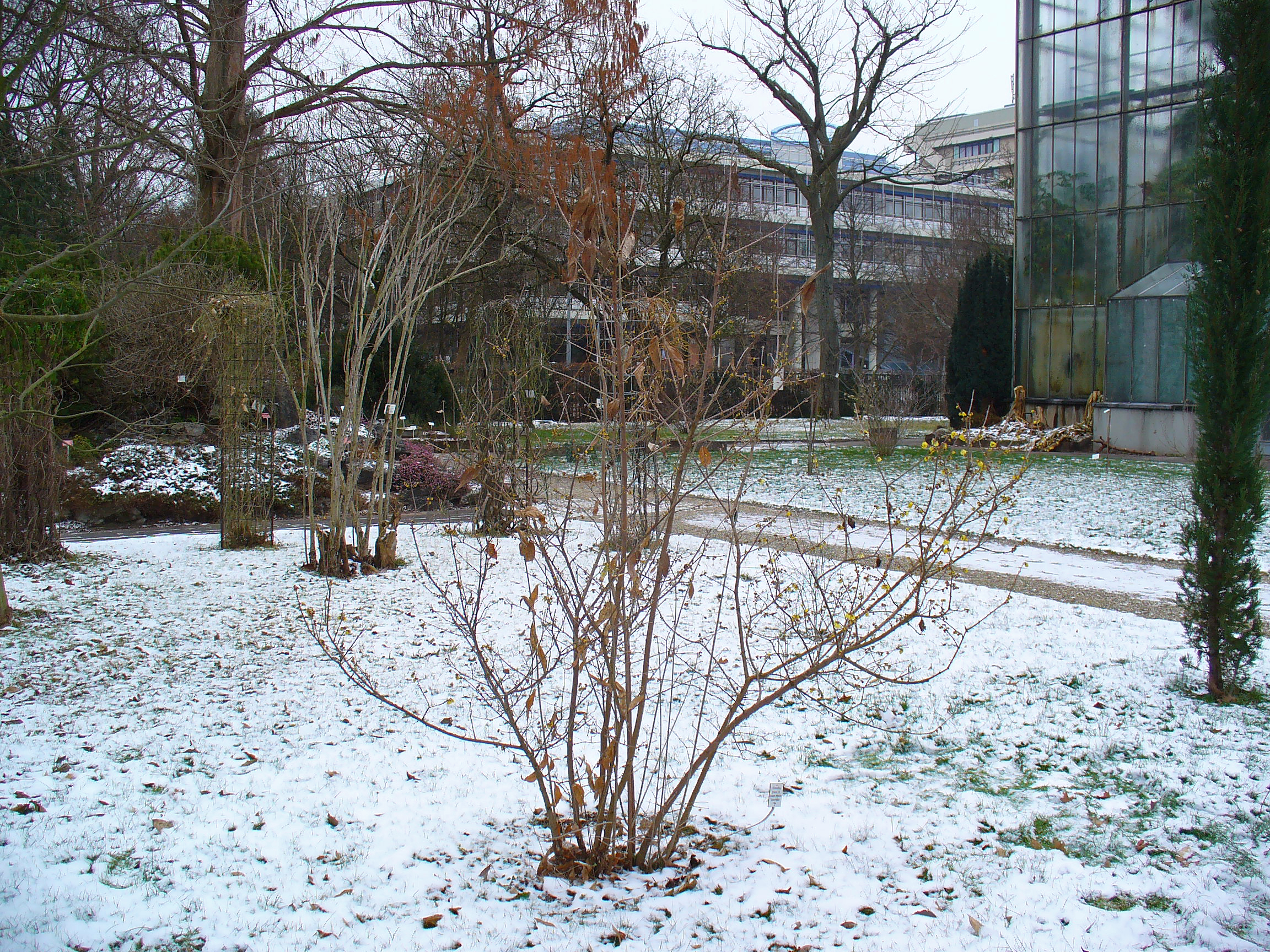
Chimonanthus praecox in January, Karlsruhe Botanical Garden, Germany

- Agapanthus praecox, a South African bulbous plant
- Aira praecox, a European grass
- Allium praecox, a Californian onion
- Casearia praecox, a West Indian tree
- Chimonanthus praecox, wintersweet, a Chinese shrub
- Clematis 'Praecox', a flowering shrub cultivar
- Cytisus × praecox, a spring-flowering shrub
- Hydrangea paniculata 'Praecox', a flowering shrub cultivar
- Lindera praecox, an Asian shrub
- Medicago praecox, a Mediterranean plant in the pea family
- Pittocaulon praecox, a Mexican shrub in the daisy family
- Pleione praecox, an Asian orchid
- Rhododendron 'Praecox', a flowering shrub cultivar
- Roscoea praecox, a Chinese perennial in the ginger family
- Stachyurus praecox, a shrub from Japan
- Thymus praecox, a European thyme
- Weigela praecox, a shrub from Russia

== Fungi ==
- Agrocybe praecox, a northern hemisphere mushroom
- Gymnopilus praecox, a North American mushroom

== Animals ==
- Actebia praecox, the Portland moth
- Ceratotherium praecox, an extinct rhinoceros
- Denticetopsis praecox, a South American fish
- Deroceras praecox, an east European slug
- Iotabrycon praecox, an Ecuadorean fish
- Melanotaenia praecox, a rainbow fish from West Papua
- Mordacia praecox, a lamprey from Australia
- Thamnophilus praecox, the Cocha antshrike, a bird from Ecuador
- Persia praecox, a trilobite

== Medical conditions ==
- Dementia praecox, a degenerative disease of late puberty and early adulthood
- Ejaculatio praecox, premature ejaculation in human males
- Lymphedema praecox, a swelling of the lymph nodes
- Pubertas praecox, premature puberty in humans
