= S. chinensis =

S. chinensis may refer to:

- Salvia chinensis, an annual plant species native to several provinces in China
- Schisandra chinensis, a deciduous woody vine species native to forests of Northern China and the Russian Far East
- Simmondsia chinensis, the jojoba, a shrub species native to the Sonoran and Mojave deserts of Arizona, California and Mexico
- Sousa chinensis, the Chinese white dolphin, a dolphin species
- Stachyurus chinensis, a flowering plant species in the genus Stachyurus
- Spilopelia chinensis, the spotted dove, a pigeon species found in tropical southern Asia from Pakistan and Sri Lanka east to south China and Southeast Asia

== Synonyms ==
- Scilla chinensis, a synonym for Barnardia japonica, a plant species

== See also ==
- Chinensis (disambiguation)
