= Stachyurus praecox var. matsuzakii =

Hachijō-kibushi

Scientific classification
- Kingdom: Plantae
- Clade: Embryophytes
- Clade: Tracheophytes
- Clade: Spermatophytes
- Clade: Angiosperms
- Clade: Eudicots
- Clade: Rosids
- Order: Crossosomatales
- Family: Stachyuraceae
- Genus: Stachyurus
- Species: S. praecox
- Variety: S. p. var. matsuzakii

Trinomial name
- Stachyurus praecox var. matsuzakii (Nakai) Makino ex H.Hara

Variety of flowering plant

Stachyurus praecox var. matsuzakii (hachijō-kibushi, ハチジョウキブシ) is a variety of Stachyurus praecox, and is only found in Japan. Compared to the other Stachyurus praecox varieties, this variety has thicker branches, longer inflorescences, and larger fruits.

== Distribution ==
Stachyurus praecox var. matsuzakii is native to the southern part of Japan, and is mainly grown around both the Izu Islands and the Tōkai region. It was first discovered on Hachijō-jima island (八丈島), one of the Izu Islands, hence the name hachijō-kibushi (ハチジョウキブシ) in Japanese, where kibushi refers to Stachyurus praecox. It is also found near a volcano on Miyake-jima island.

== Habitat and ecology ==
Stachyurus praecox var. matsuzakii is a deciduous shrub that grows in mountainous regions that are near the coast. It grows in a relatively warm and humid environment. In addition, it is known to grow in gaps left behind by volcanic activity.

== Description ==
Stachyurus praecox var. matsuzakii is a deciduous shrub. It has a height of 5 meters (16 ft), which is higher than other Stachyurus praecox varieties. The ovate-shaped leaves are thin, and they grow alternatively. The size of its spikes is very large, and these spikes can grow to lengths of more than 20 cm (7.9 in).

== Flowers and fruit ==
Its pendulous flowers are bell shaped, consisting of four petals, and yellow-cream spike inflorescence emerges from their axils. The flower heads are 1 cm long, and usually bloom between March and April. Male flowers and female flowers are separated. A male flower has eight stamens in two whorl-shaped flowers with one style. A female flower has shorter spikes. Although it is hard to distinguish a male flower and a female flower from the physical appearance, the length of the inflorescence is often longer for the male. The fruits are berries with persistent style and contain many seeds.

=== Uses ===
The flowers can be used for Ikebana, the Japanese art of flower arrangement, as well as being grown in Japanese gardens. The fruits it produces are used for color dyeing.
