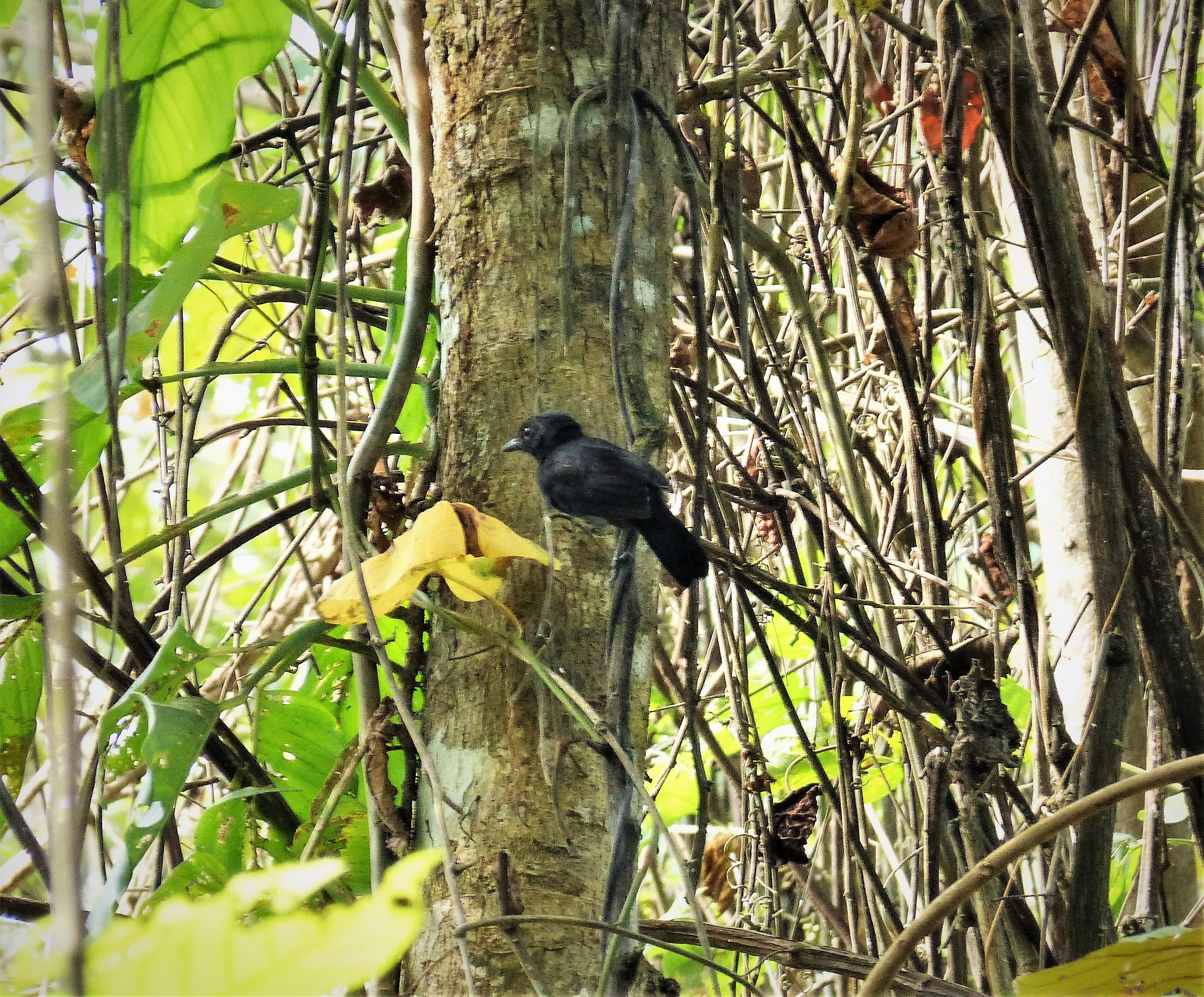

Conservation status
- Least Concern (IUCN 3.1)

Scientific classification
- Kingdom: Animalia
- Phylum: Chordata
- Class: Aves
- Order: Passeriformes
- Family: Thamnophilidae
- Genus: Thamnophilus
- Species: T. nigriceps

Binomial name
- Thamnophilus nigriceps Sclater, PL, 1869

= Black antshrike =

Species of bird

The black antshrike (Thamnophilus nigriceps) is a species of insectivorous bird in subfamily Thamnophilinae of family Thamnophilidae, the "typical antbirds". It is found in Colombia and Panama.

== Taxonomy and systematics ==
The black antshrike was described by the English zoologist Philip Sclater in 1869 and given its current binomial name Thamnophilus nigriceps.

The black antshrike is monotypic. It and the cocha antshrike (T. praecox) are sister species.

== Description ==
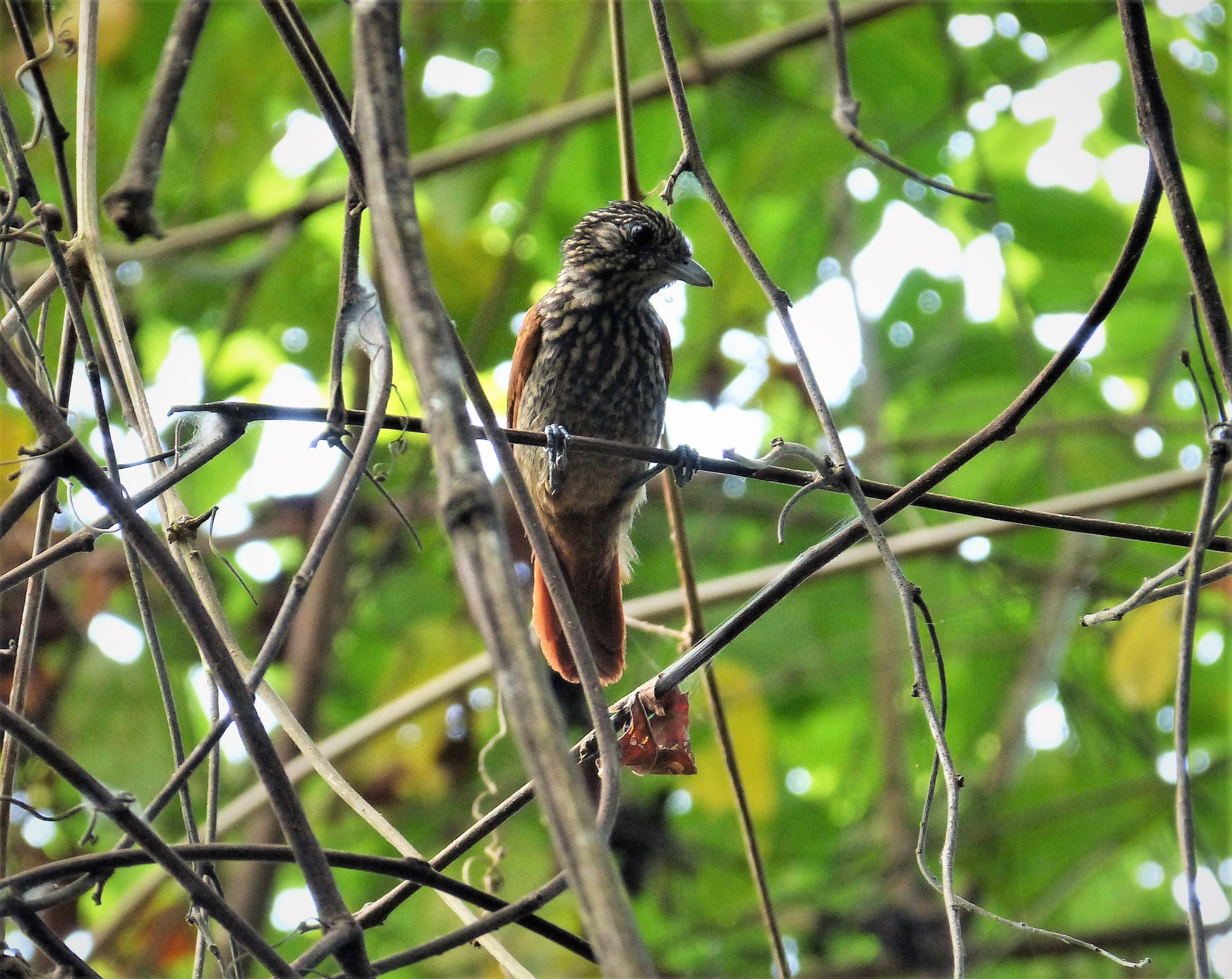
female bird

The black antshrike is 15 to 16 cm (5.9 to 6.3 in) long and weighs 23 to 24 g (0.81 to 0.85 oz). Members of genus Thamnophilus are largish members of the antbird family; all have stout bills with a hook like those of true shrikes. This species exhibits some sexual dimorphism. Adult males are almost entirely black. They have dark gray flanks and their underwing coverts and edges of the underside of their flight feathers are white. Adult females have a blackish gray head and upper breast with buff-white streaks. Their upperparts, wings, and tail are rufous-brown. Their lower breast and belly are gray with buff-white streaks and their crissum is unstreaked buff. The width of the streaks varies among individuals, and the amount of streaking increases from nearly none in the north to a significant amount in the south. Subadult males resemble adult females but with pale edges on the wing coverts and black bars on the crissum. Subadult females have wider streaks on their breast than adults.

== Distribution and habitat ==
The black antshrike is found in Panama from eastern Panamá Province south through Darién Province into northern Colombia. In that country it is found from northern Chocó Department east to, but not into, the Sierra Nevada de Santa Marta in western La Guajira Department and south in the Magdalena River valley to Tolima Department. It primarily inhabits the edges and regrowing clearings of evergreen forest, and also secondary forest and semi-open woodlands. It greatly favors dense thickets of vines, thorns, and Heliconia. In elevation it ranges from sea level to 600 m (2,000 ft).

== Behavior ==
=== Movement ===
The black antshrike is a year-round resident throughout its range.

=== Feeding ===
The black antshrike's diet is not known but is assumed to be insects and other arthropods. It usually forages singly or in pairs and seldom joins mixed-species feeding flocks. It forages in dense vegetation, usually within 2 m (7 ft) of the ground but sometimes as high as 7 m (25 ft) above it. It hops among branches to glean prey.

=== Breeding ===
Nothing is known about the black antshrike's breeding biology.

=== Vocalization ===
The black antshrike's song is "a moderately long...slightly accelerating, evenly pitched series of somewhat musical yet emphatic notes". Its calls include a "hollow, nasal note sometimes repeated" and a "nasal growl".

== Status ==
The IUCN has assessed the black antshrike as being of Least Concern. It has a large range and an estimated population of 20,000 to 50,000 mature individuals; the latter is believed to be decreasing. No immediate threats have been identified. It is considered locally common in Colombia and occurs in two national parks in that country. It is poorly known and "[p]erhaps better categorized as Data-deficient".
