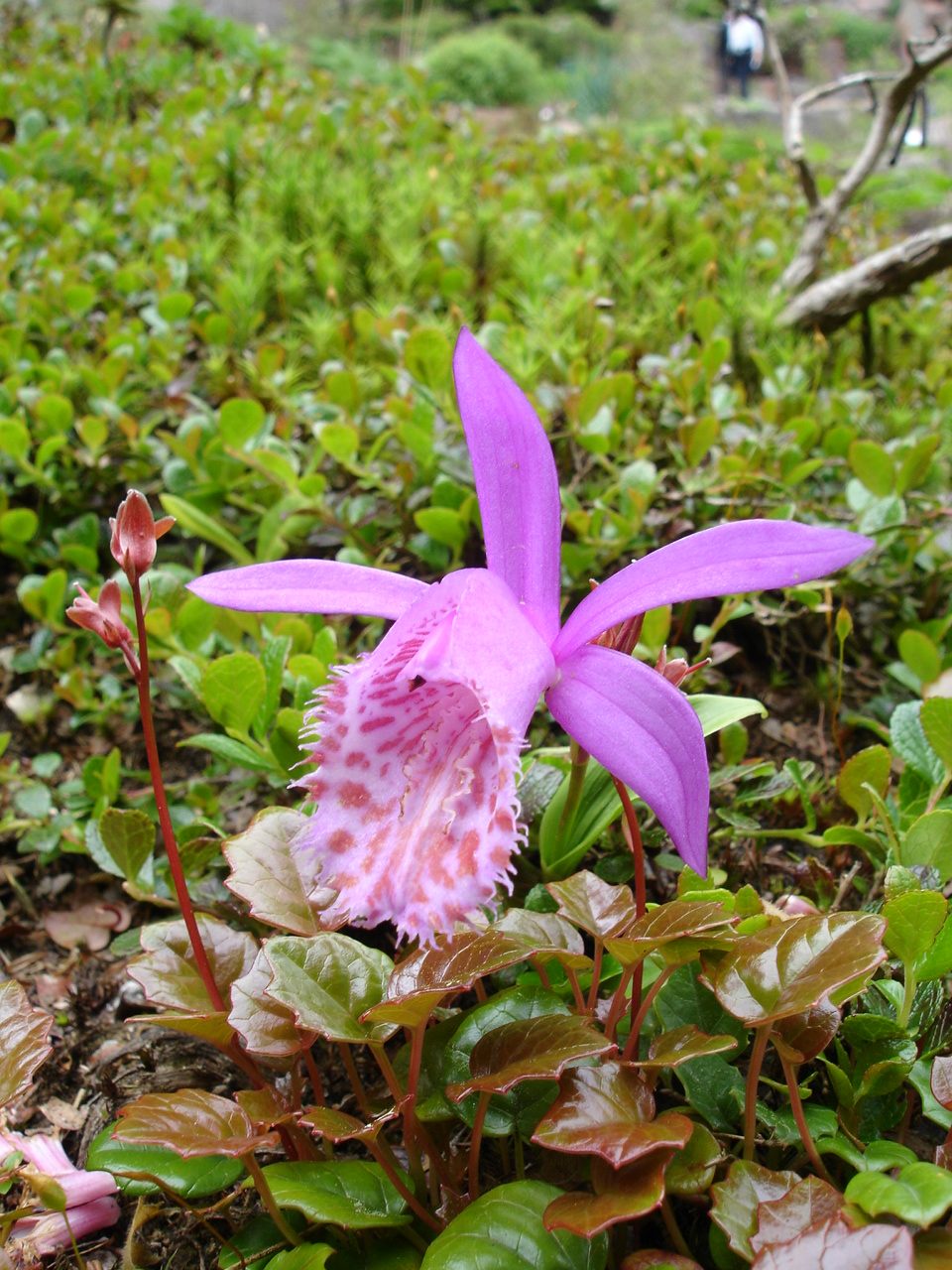

Scientific classification
- Kingdom: Plantae
- Clade: Embryophytes
- Clade: Tracheophytes
- Clade: Spermatophytes
- Clade: Angiosperms
- Clade: Monocots
- Order: Asparagales
- Family: Orchidaceae
- Subfamily: Epidendroideae
- Tribe: Arethuseae
- Genus: Pleione
- Species: P. limprichtii

Binomial name
- Pleione limprichtii Schltr.

Synonyms
- Pleione bulbocodioides var. limprichtii (Schltr.) P.J.Cribb

= Pleione limprichtii =

Species of orchid

Pleione limprichtii, the hardy Chinese orchid, is a species of flowering plant in the family Orchidaceae, endemic to China (central Sichuan), and also possibly grows in northern Burma. It is an epiphytic (growing from plants) or lithophytic (growing from rocks) orchid growing to 15 cm (6 in) tall by 30 cm (12 in) broad, with a pear-shaped pseudobulb that produces a single folded leaf. Deep pink flowers with rose red spotted lips are borne in spring.

It can take several degrees below freezing growing in a shaded, sheltered spot. Alternatively it may be grown as a houseplant, in a cool room indoors.

This plant has gained the Royal Horticultural Society's Award of Garden Merit.
