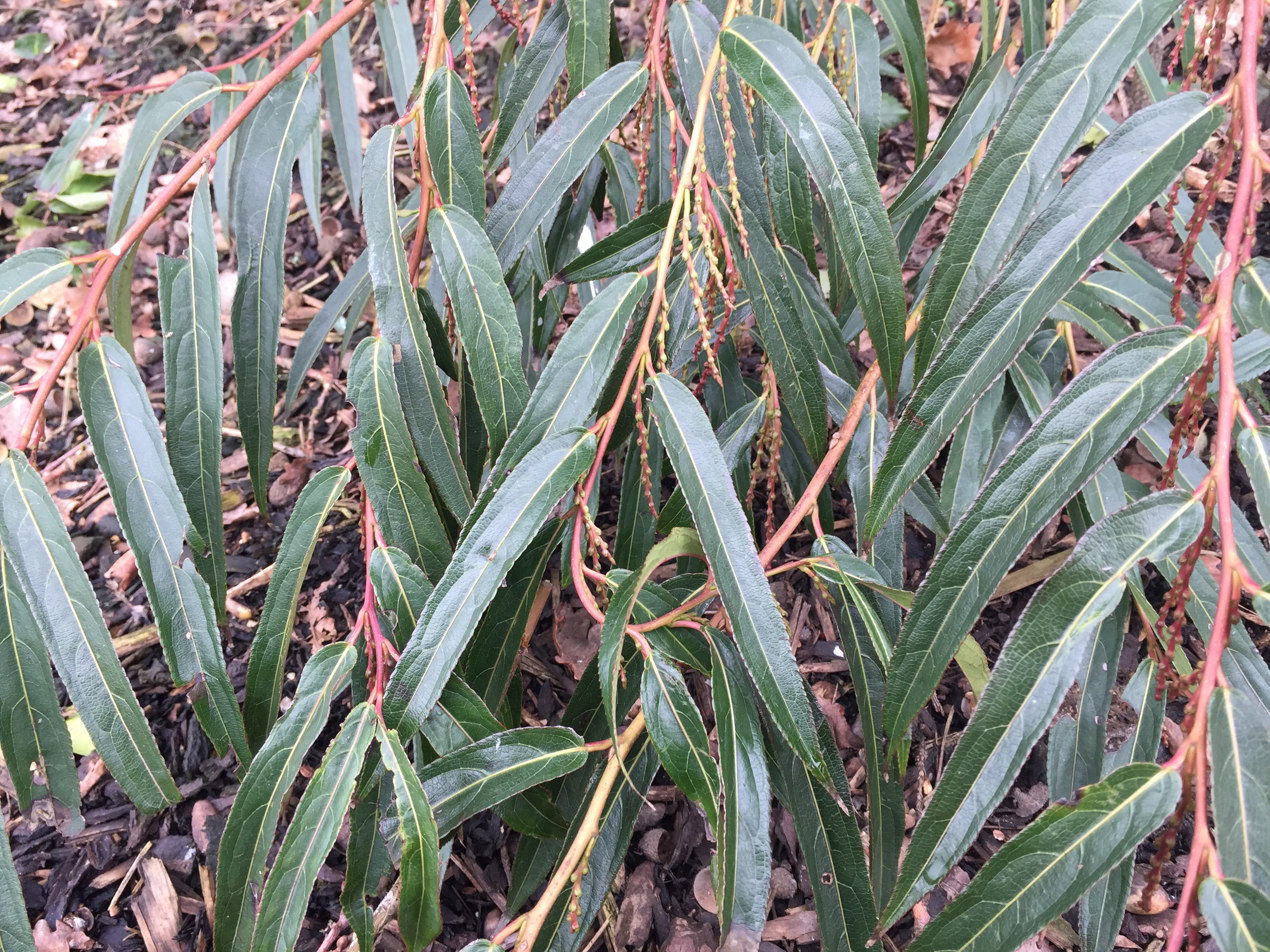

Scientific classification
- Kingdom: Plantae
- Clade: Tracheophytes
- Clade: Angiosperms
- Clade: Eudicots
- Clade: Rosids
- Order: Crossosomatales
- Family: Stachyuraceae
- Genus: Stachyurus
- Species: S. salicifolius

Binomial name
- Stachyurus salicifolius Franch.

= Stachyurus salicifolius =

Species of flowering plant

Stachyurus salicifolius, also known by the Chinese vernacular name 柳叶旌节花 (Liǔ yè jīng jié huā), is a species in the genus Stachyurus in the family Stachyuraceae. It is native to China, specifically Chongqing, Sichuan, and northeast Yunnan.

== Description ==
Stachyurus salicifolius is an evergreen shrub which reaches 2-3 metres in height at maturity. In its native habitat, it flowers from April-May and fruits from June-July.

== Etymology ==
Stachyurus is derived from Greek and means 'spiked tail'. The name is a reference to the shape of the inflorescences of this genus.

Salicifolius means 'with leaves resembling those of Salix' (Salix + foliage).
