= Pleione pleionoides =

Conservation status
- Vulnerable (IUCN 3.1)

Scientific classification
- Kingdom: Plantae
- Clade: Tracheophytes
- Clade: Angiosperms
- Clade: Monocots
- Order: Asparagales
- Family: Orchidaceae
- Subfamily: Epidendroideae
- Tribe: Arethuseae
- Genus: Pleione
- Species: P. pleionoides

Binomial name
- Pleione pleionoides (Kraenzl. ex Diels) Braem & H.Mohr

Species of orchid

Pleione pleionoides is a species of plant in the family Orchidaceae. It is endemic to south-central China and can be found in Hubei and Sichuan.
