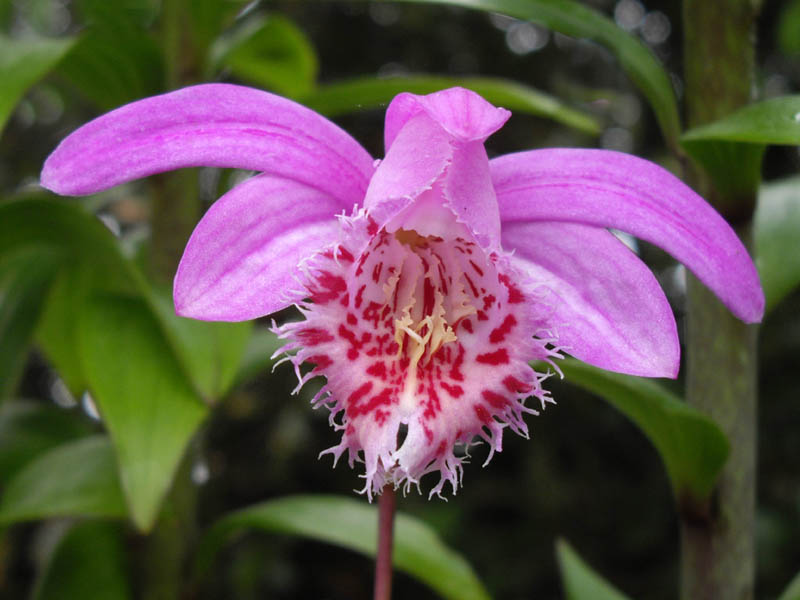
- Pleione bulbocodioides

Scientific classification
- Kingdom: Plantae
- Clade: Tracheophytes
- Clade: Angiosperms
- Clade: Monocots
- Order: Asparagales
- Family: Orchidaceae
- Subfamily: Epidendroideae
- Tribe: Arethuseae
- Subtribe: Coelogyninae
- Genus: Pleione; D.Don

Synonyms
- Gomphostylis Wall. ex Lindl.

= Pleione (plant) =

Genus of orchids

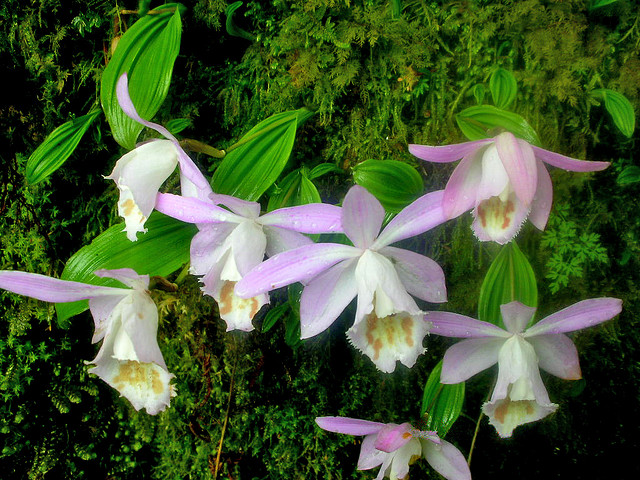
Pleione hookeriana

Pleione is a small genus of predominantly terrestrial but sometimes epiphytic or lithophytic, miniature orchids. This genus is named after Pleione, mother of the Pleiades (in Greek mythology), and comprises about 20 species. Common names of this genus include peacock orchid, glory of the east, Himalayan crocus, Indian crocus and windowsill orchid. The genus Diploconchium Schauer is generally included here. Pleione is abbreviated to Pln in trade journals.

== Name ==
Pleione is named after the water-nymph Pleione of Greek mythology.

== Growth ==
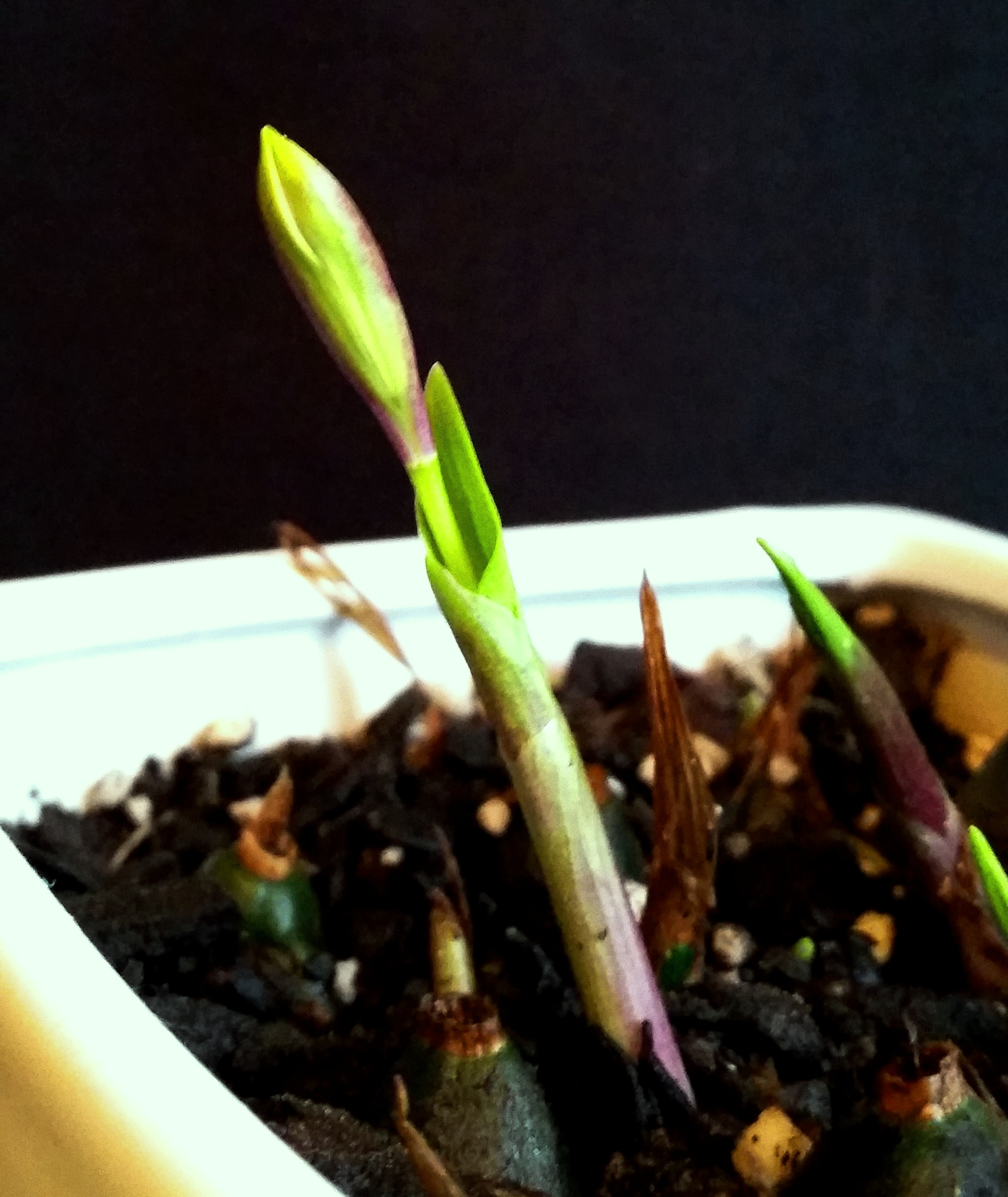
Developing flower shoot

Pleione orchids have a terrestrial, sympodial growth habit. They have relatively large, spongy, almost globular or ampulliform pseudobulbs, narrowed at the apex. Every pseudobulb is active for one year and carries one or two pleated parallel-veined leaves, with a length of 15–30 cm (6–12 in). These drop off before winter. The pseudobulb stays dormant until a new one starts to develop in the spring. The spring growth produces new roots and a short pedicel. This pseudobulb remains active until the end of the bloom.

The big, showy flowers originate from new shoots formed at the base of the pseudobulb. They are pink to purplish, white or yellow, while the fringed, tubular lip is often paler or white, with yellow, red or purple dots and stripes. The flowers of the mountain species start blooming in spring, while the new shoots develop. The species growing in warmer climates bloom in autumn, when the leaves have dropped.

They are very closely related to the genus Coelogyne and were once considered part of it.

== Distribution and habitat ==
Pleione is distributed in the mountains and foothills of the Himalayas, India, Tibet, Nepal, Bhutan, Bangladesh, Myanmar, Thailand, Laos, Vietnam, Taiwan, and China. The species are well adapted to cold temperatures and even frost. A few, however, prefer warmer temperatures. They grow in well-drained habitats and on rocks covered with moss at altitudes of 600–4,200 m (1,969–13,780 ft).

== Species ==
- Pleione albiflora (China – W. Yunnan to N. Burma).
- Pleione aurita (China – W. Yunnan).
- Pleione autumnalis
- Pleione arunachalensis
- Pleione bulbocodioides (C. China to SE. Tibet).
- Pleione chunii (S. China).
- Pleione coronaria (C. Nepal).
- Pleione dilamellata
- Pleione formosana: Taiwan pleione (SE. China, N. & C. Taiwan).
- Pleione forrestii (China – NW. Yunnan to N. Burma).
- Pleione grandiflora (China – S. Yunnan to NW. Vietnam).
- Pleione hookeriana (Nepal to China – SE. Yunnan to N. Guangdong to Indo-China).
- Pleione humilis (C. Himalaya to Burma).
- Pleione kaatiae
- Pleione limprichtii: hardy Chinese orchid (China – C. Sichuan).
- Pleione maculata (C. Himalaya to China – W. Yunnan).
- Pleione microphylla (China – Guangdong).
- Pleione pleionoides (C. China).
- Pleione praecox (WC. Himalaya to China – S. Yunnan), type species.
- Pleione saxicola (E. Bhutan to China – NW. Yunnan).
- Pleione scopulorum (India – NE. Arunachal Pradesh to China – NW. Yunnan).
- Pleione vietnamensis (SC. Vietnam).
- Pleione yunnanensis (SC. China to N. Burma).

=== Natural hybrids ===
- Pleione × christianii (P. yunnanensis × P. forrestii) (China – W. Yunnan).
- Pleione × confusa (P. albiflora × P. forrestii) (China – W. Yunnan).
- Pleione × kohlsii (P. aurita × P. forrestii) (China – W. Yunnan).
- Pleione × lagenaria (P. maculata × P. praecox) (Assam to China – W. Yunnan).
- Pleione × taliensis (P. bulbocodioides × P. yunnanensis) (China – W. Yunnan).

== Taxonomy ==
It has been suggested that P. bulbocodioides, P. limprichtii and P. pleionoides could all be the same species.

Currently, there are two sections in the genus Pleione:

- section Pleione (includes the autumn-flowered species): P. × lagenaria, P. maculata, P. praecox, P. saxicola
- section Humiles (includes the spring-flowering species): P. albiflora, P. bulbocodioides, P. chunii, P. × confusa, P. coronaria, P. formosana, P. forrestii, P. grandiflora, P. hookeriana, P. praecox, P. × kohlsii, P. limprichtii, P. pleionoides, P. scopulorum, P. yunnanensis

== Cultivation ==
They are easily grown by the layman, easy to propagate and are among the most popular orchids. They are much in demand for hybridization. Numerous garden hybrids have been produced, of which the following have gained the Royal Horticultural Society's Award of Garden Merit:-

- Pleione Shantung grex 'Muriel Harberd'

=== Nothogenera ===
Hybrids of Pleione with other genera are placed in the following nothogenera:

- Pleionilla (Plnl.) = Pleione × Bletilla
- Coeleione (Coeln.) = Pleione × Coelogyne

== Sources ==
- Phillip Cribb & Ian Butterfield : The Genus Pleione (Second Edition 1999) Natural History Publications in association with the Royal Botanic Gardens, Kew. ISBN 983-812-040-5
- C. Z. Tang & I. Butterfield. 1983. The genus Pleione. Curtis's Bot. Mag. 184: 93–147.
