= Pleione chunii =

Conservation status
- Vulnerable (IUCN 3.1)

Scientific classification
- Kingdom: Plantae
- Clade: Tracheophytes
- Clade: Angiosperms
- Clade: Monocots
- Order: Asparagales
- Family: Orchidaceae
- Subfamily: Epidendroideae
- Tribe: Arethuseae
- Genus: Pleione
- Species: P. chunii

Binomial name
- Pleione chunii C.L.Tso

Species of orchid

Pleione chunii is a species of plant in the family Orchidaceae. It is endemic to southern China.
