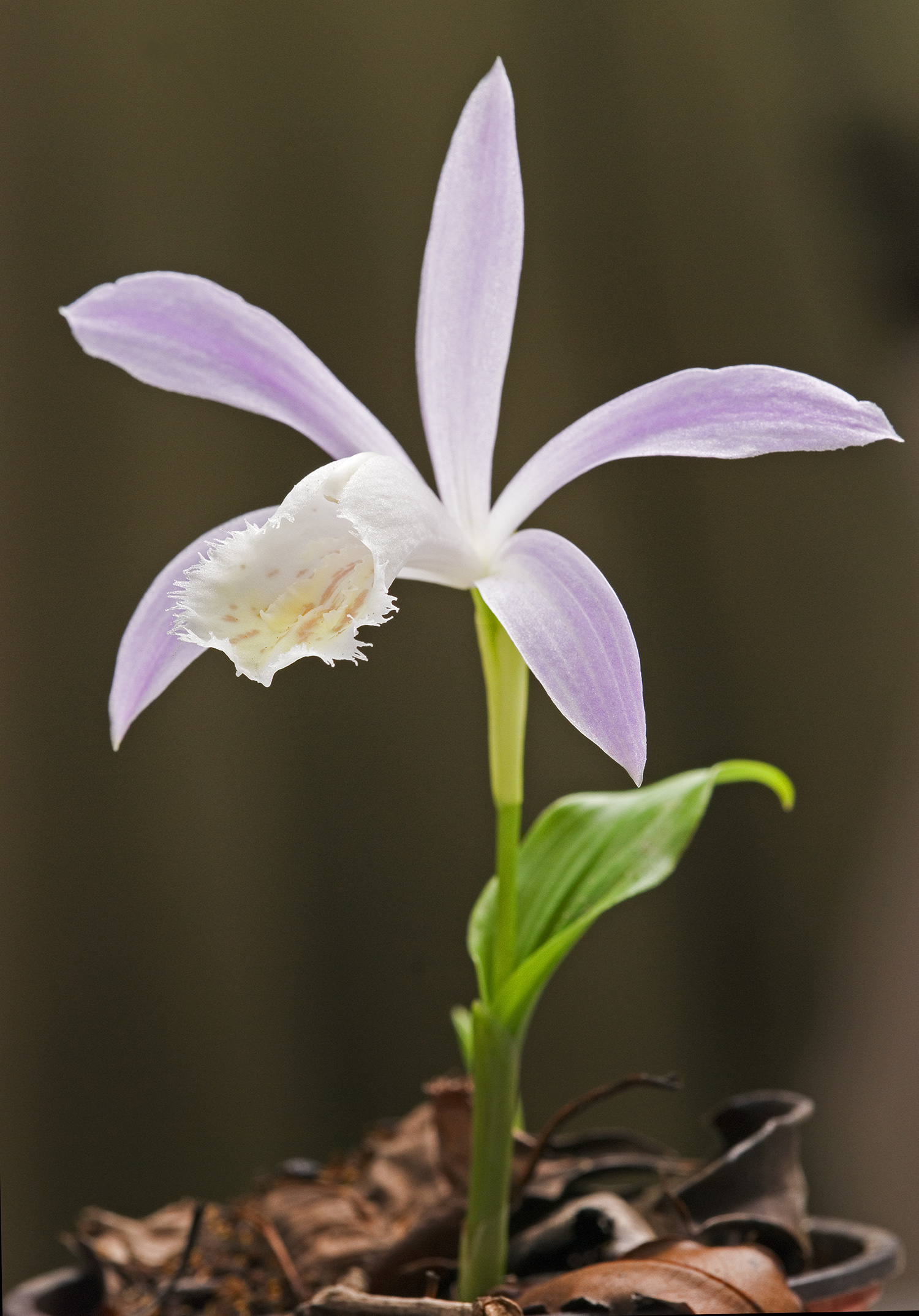

Conservation status
- Vulnerable (IUCN 3.1)

Scientific classification
- Kingdom: Plantae
- Clade: Embryophytes
- Clade: Tracheophytes
- Clade: Spermatophytes
- Clade: Angiosperms
- Clade: Monocots
- Order: Asparagales
- Family: Orchidaceae
- Subfamily: Epidendroideae
- Tribe: Arethuseae
- Genus: Pleione
- Species: P. formosana

Binomial name
- Pleione formosana Hayata

Synonyms
- Pleione pricei Rolfe; Pleione hui Schltr.

= Pleione formosana =

Species of orchid

Pleione formosana, the Taiwan pleione or windowsill orchid, is a species of flowering plant in the family Orchidaceae, native to southeastern China as well as northern and central Taiwan. It is a deciduous perennial, terrestrial orchid growing to 15 cm (6 in) tall by 30 cm (12 in) wide, with spherical pseudobulbs that produce a single folded leaf. The pink flowers, borne in spring, have fringed white lips that are strongly marked and mottled with brown on the inner surface.

The specific epithet formosana refers to Taiwan's former name, Formosa.

This plant has gained the Royal Horticultural Society's Award of Garden Merit. In the UK it is rated as H3, which means that it can be grown outside in mild, sheltered areas where the soil does not dry out. It may also be grown under glass in a cool position.

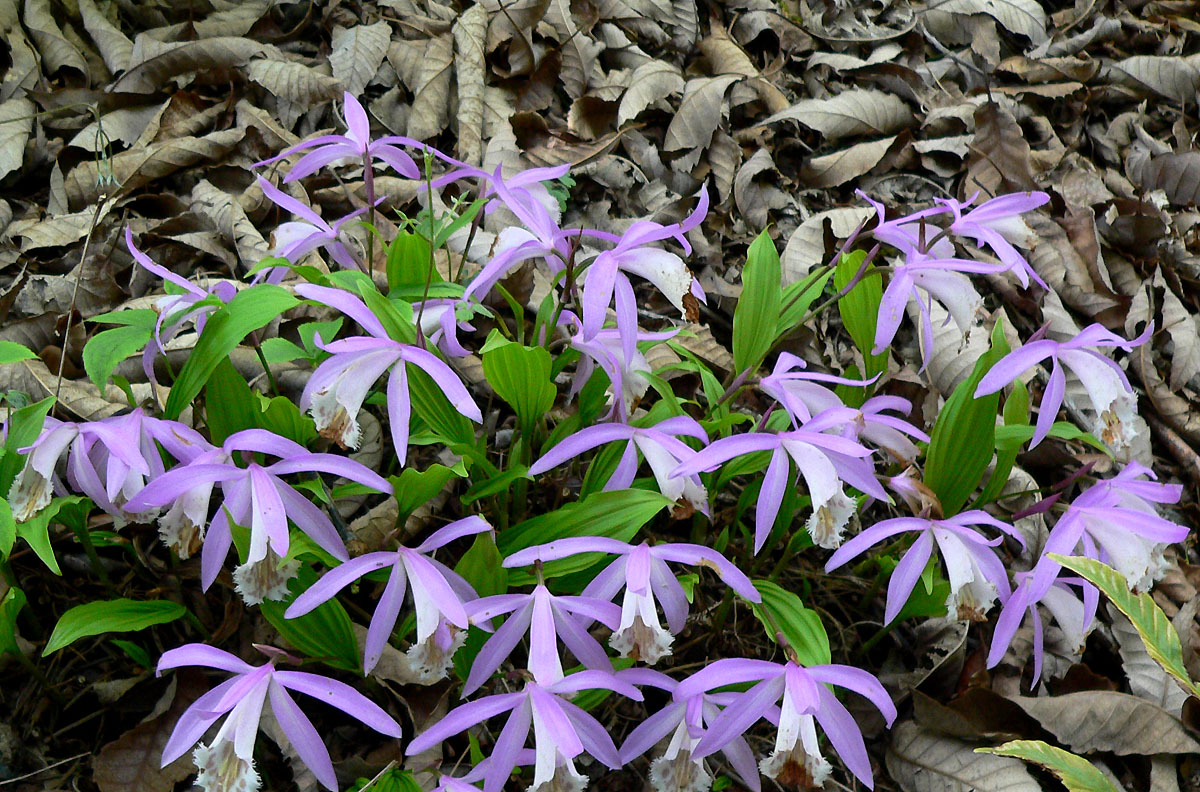

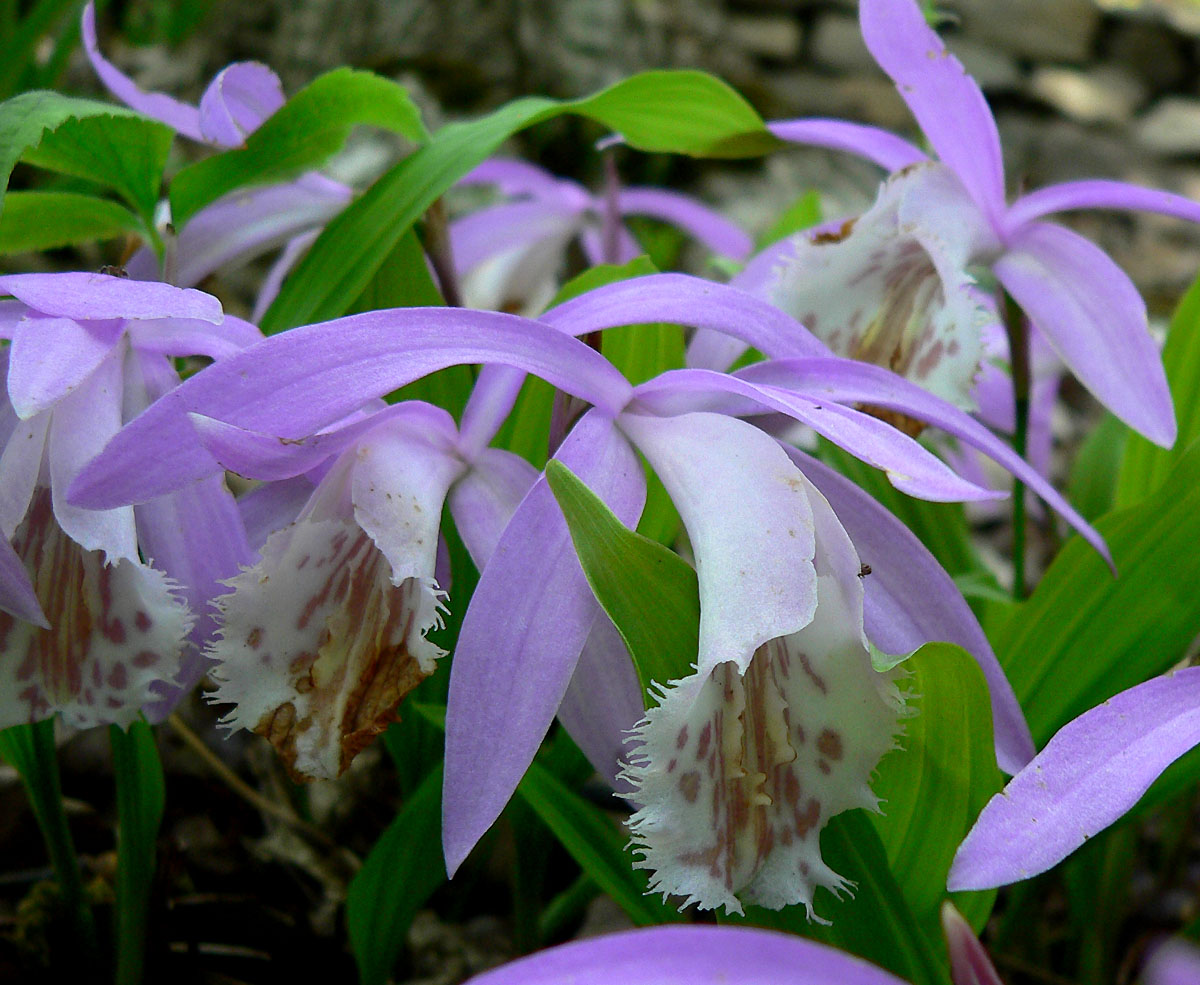
