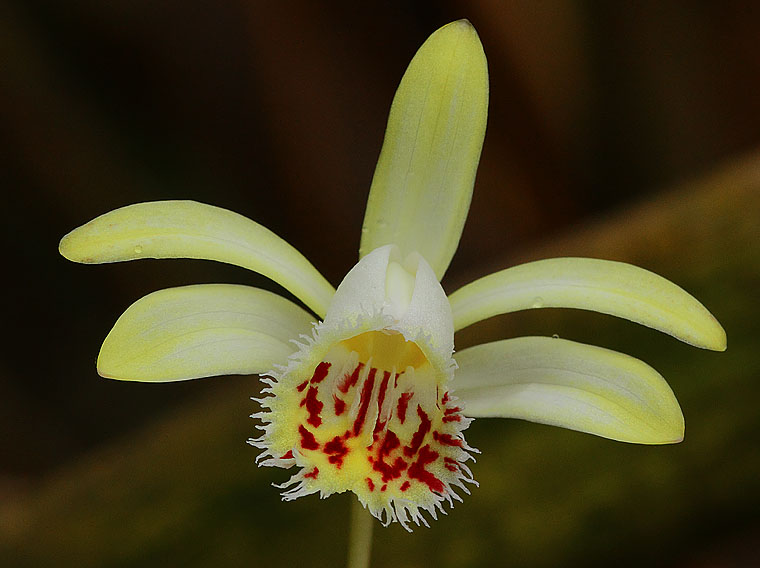

Conservation status
- Endangered (IUCN 3.1)

Scientific classification
- Kingdom: Plantae
- Clade: Embryophytes
- Clade: Tracheophytes
- Clade: Spermatophytes
- Clade: Angiosperms
- Clade: Monocots
- Order: Asparagales
- Family: Orchidaceae
- Subfamily: Epidendroideae
- Tribe: Arethuseae
- Genus: Pleione
- Species: P. forrestii

Binomial name
- Pleione forrestii Schltr.

= Pleione forrestii =

Species of orchid

Pleione forrestii is a species of flowering plant in the orchid family, Orchidaceae. It is endemic to Yunnan in China.

It was named in honour of George Forrest (1873–1932).
