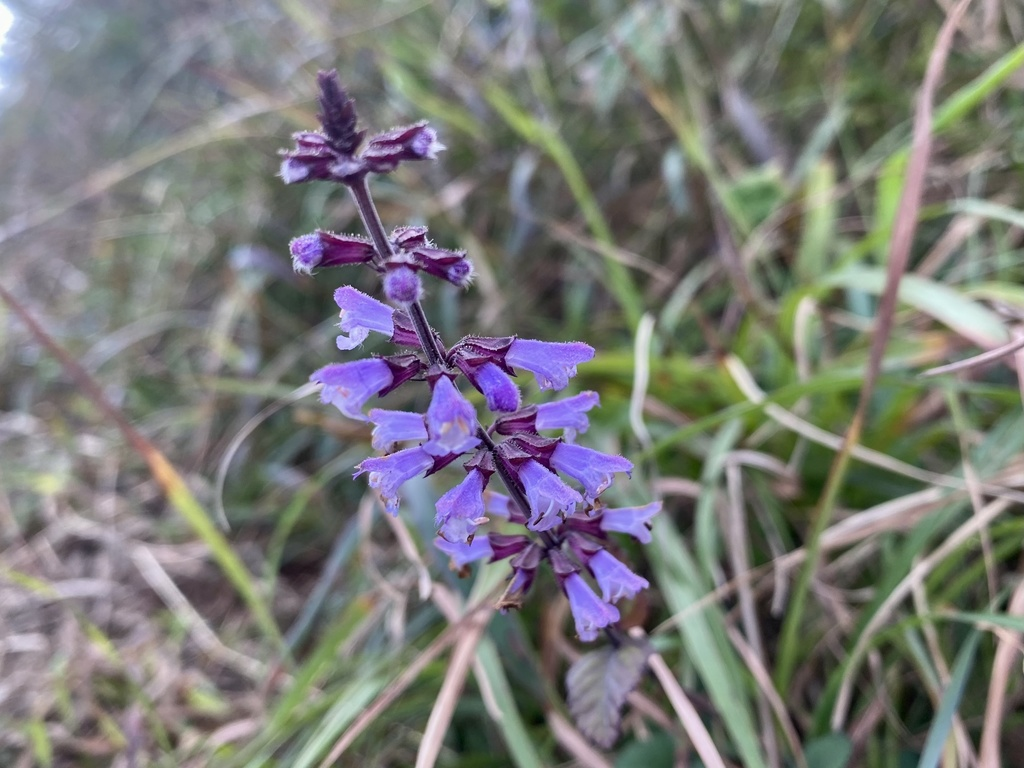

Scientific classification
- Kingdom: Plantae
- Clade: Tracheophytes
- Clade: Angiosperms
- Clade: Eudicots
- Clade: Asterids
- Order: Lamiales
- Family: Lamiaceae
- Genus: Salvia
- Species: S. chinensis

Binomial name
- Salvia chinensis Benth.

= Salvia chinensis =

Species of grass-like plant

Salvia chinensis (the Chinese sage) is an annual plant that is native to several provinces in China, growing in forests, and in tufts of grass on hillsides or plains at 100 to 500 m (330 to 1,640 ft) elevation. S. chinensis grows on stems that are erect or prostrate to a height of 20 to 60 cm (7.9 to 23.6 in). Inflorescences are 6-flowered verticillasters in terminal racemes or panicles, with a 1 cm (0.39 in) blue-purple or purple corolla.
