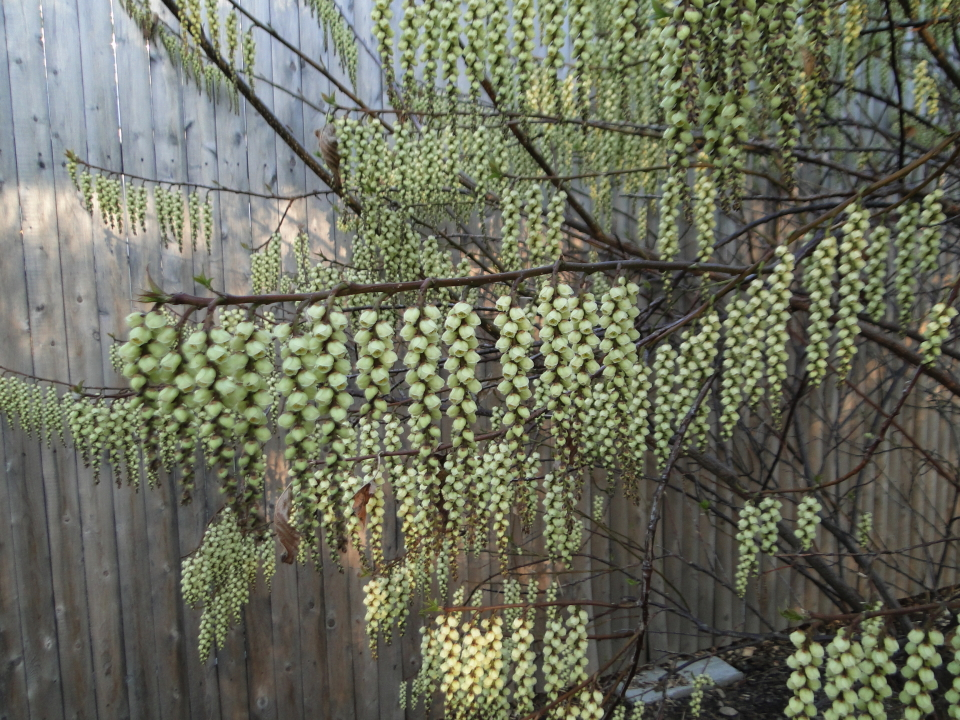
- Brooklyn Botanic Garden, New York

Scientific classification
- Kingdom: Plantae
- Clade: Embryophytes
- Clade: Tracheophytes
- Clade: Spermatophytes
- Clade: Angiosperms
- Clade: Eudicots
- Clade: Rosids
- Order: Crossosomatales
- Family: Stachyuraceae
- Genus: Stachyurus
- Species: S. praecox

Binomial name
- Stachyurus praecox Siebold & Zucc.

Varieties
- Stachyurus praecox var. matsuzakii; Stachyurus praecox var. praecox

= Stachyurus praecox =

Species of flowering plant

Stachyurus praecox, early stachyurus, is a species of flowering plant in the family Stachyuraceae, native to Japan. It is a spreading deciduous shrub growing to 4 m (13 ft) tall by 3 m (10 ft) wide. Pendent, bell-shaped, primrose yellow flowers are borne on naked arching branches in winter and spring. They are followed by ovate leaves, which colour to pink or red before falling in autumn.

The Latin specific epithet praecox means "early", referring to the exceptionally early flowering season. It was first described in 1836 by Philipp Franz von Siebold and Joseph Gerhard Zuccarini.

This plant is cultivated as an ornamental subject in temperate parks and gardens, though rarely seen. It has gained the Royal Horticultural Society's Award of Garden Merit.

== Gallery ==
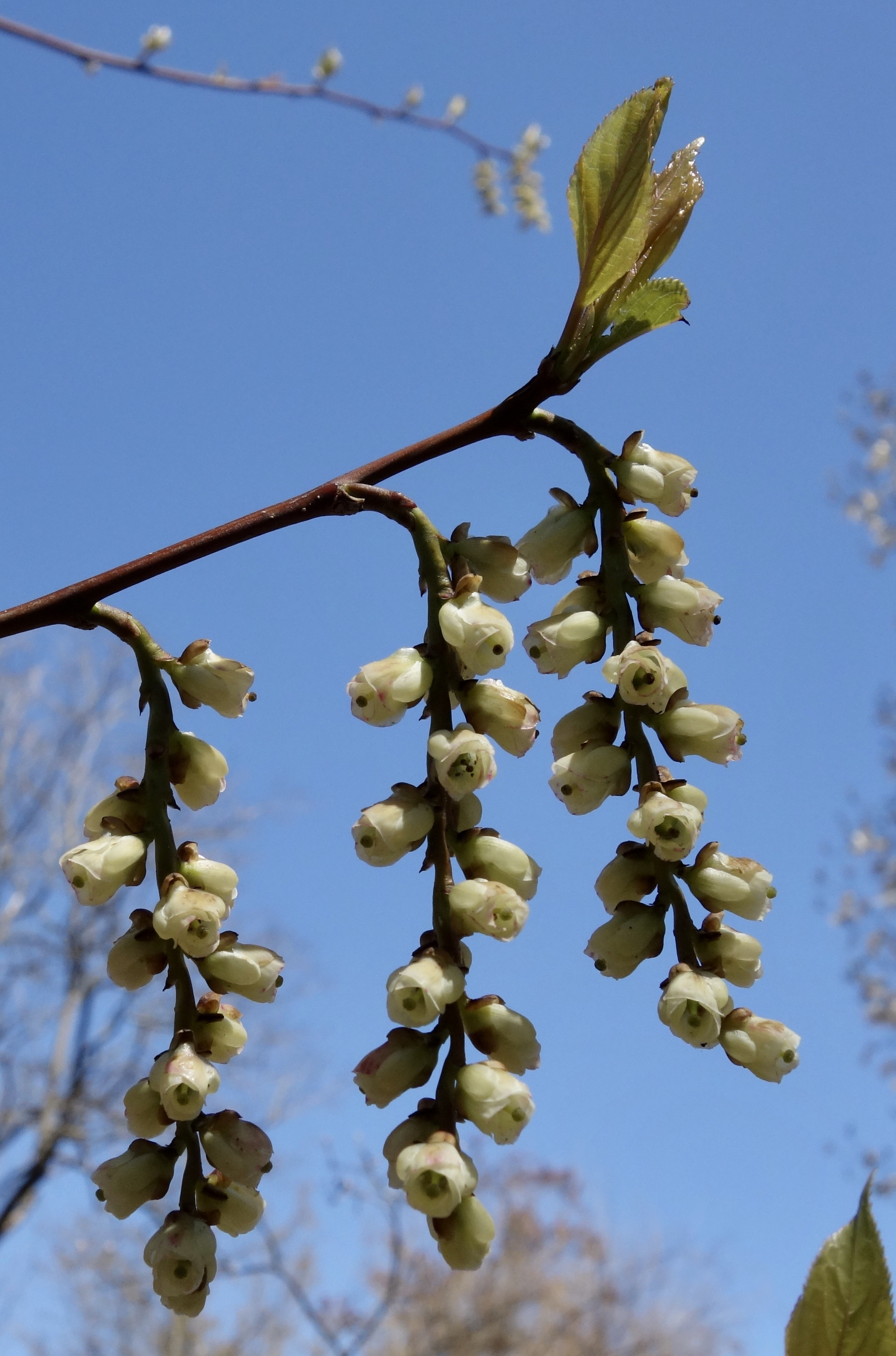
Shoot with inflorescences and emerging leaves

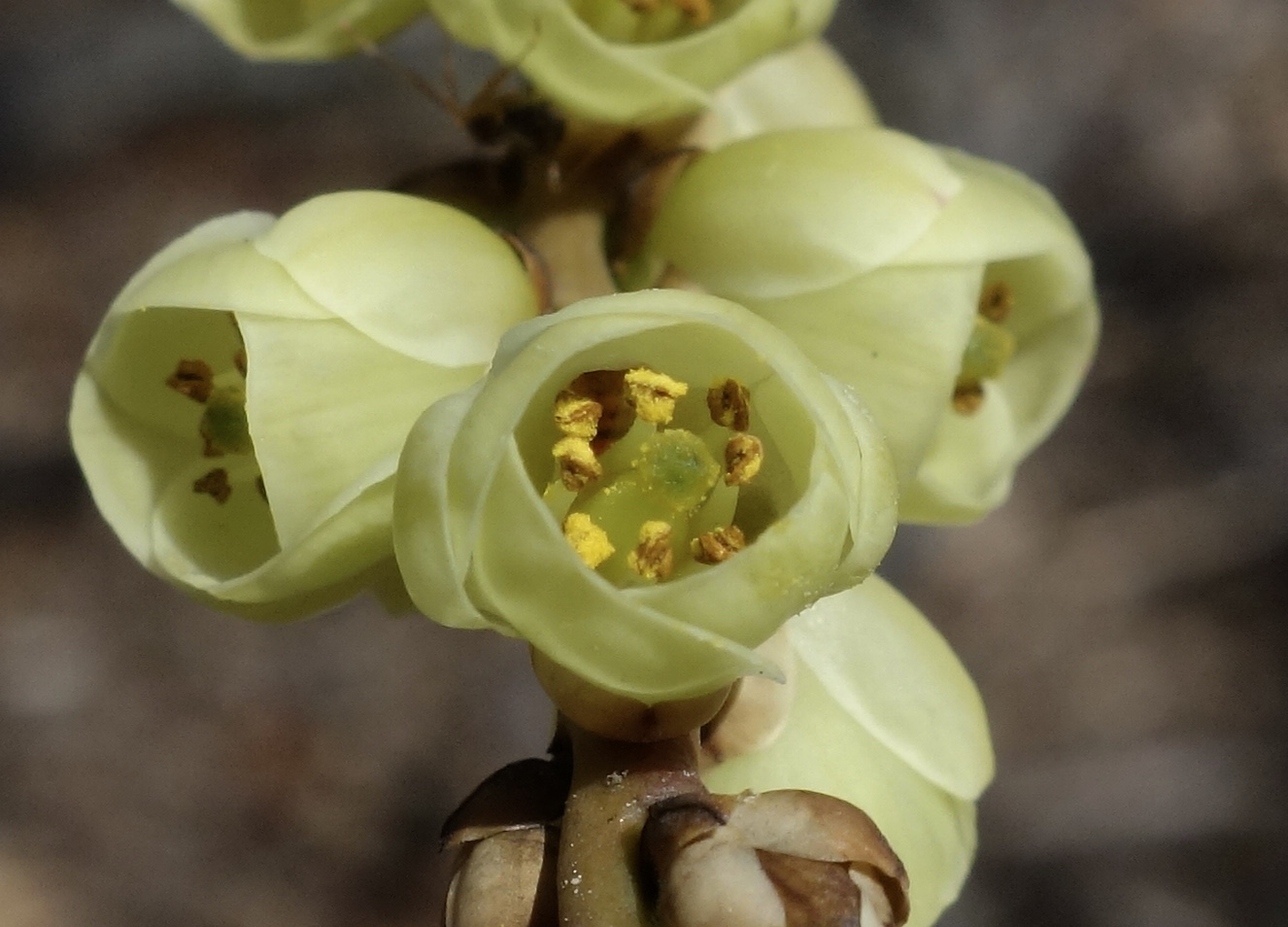
Flower detail

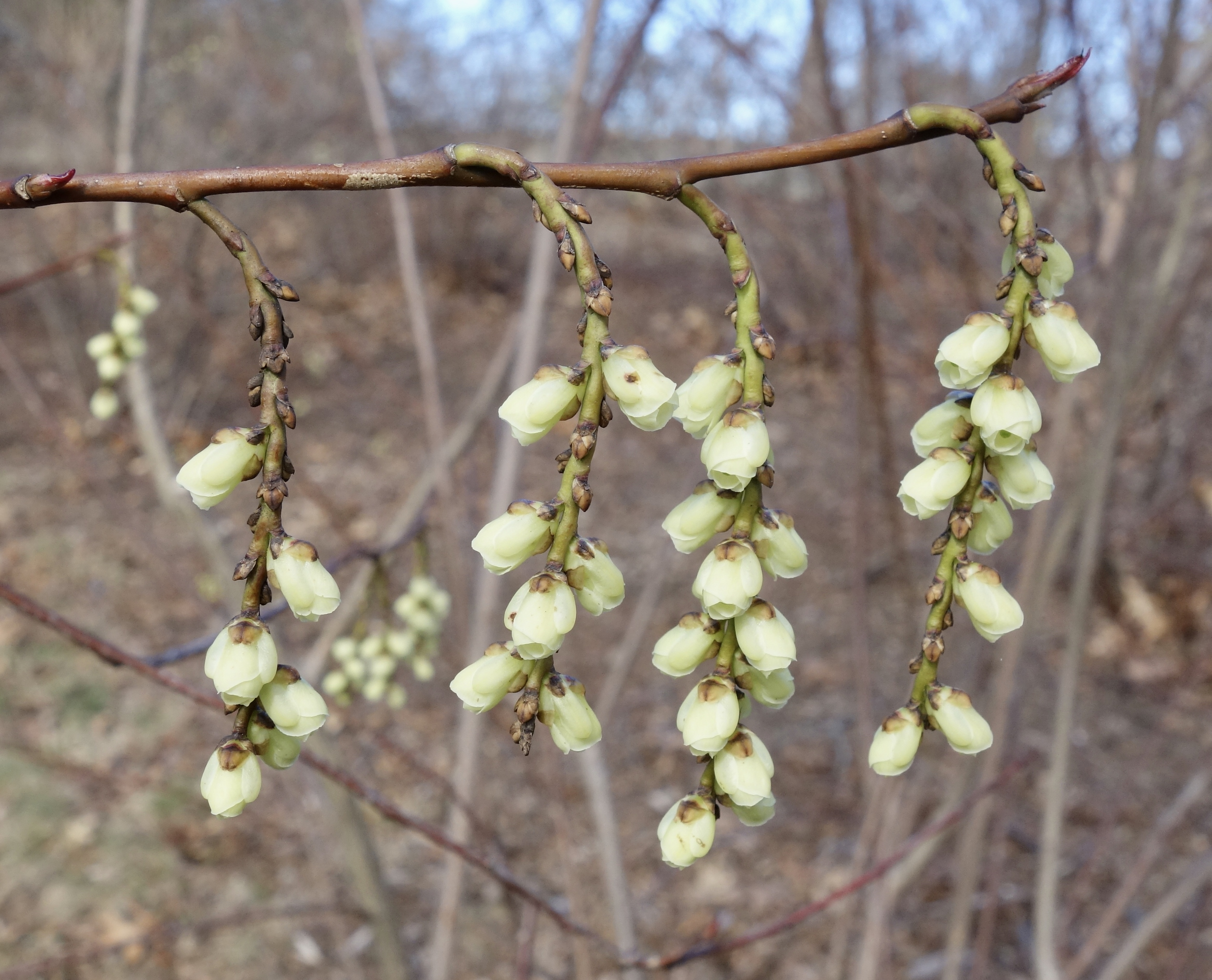
Shoot with inflorescences
