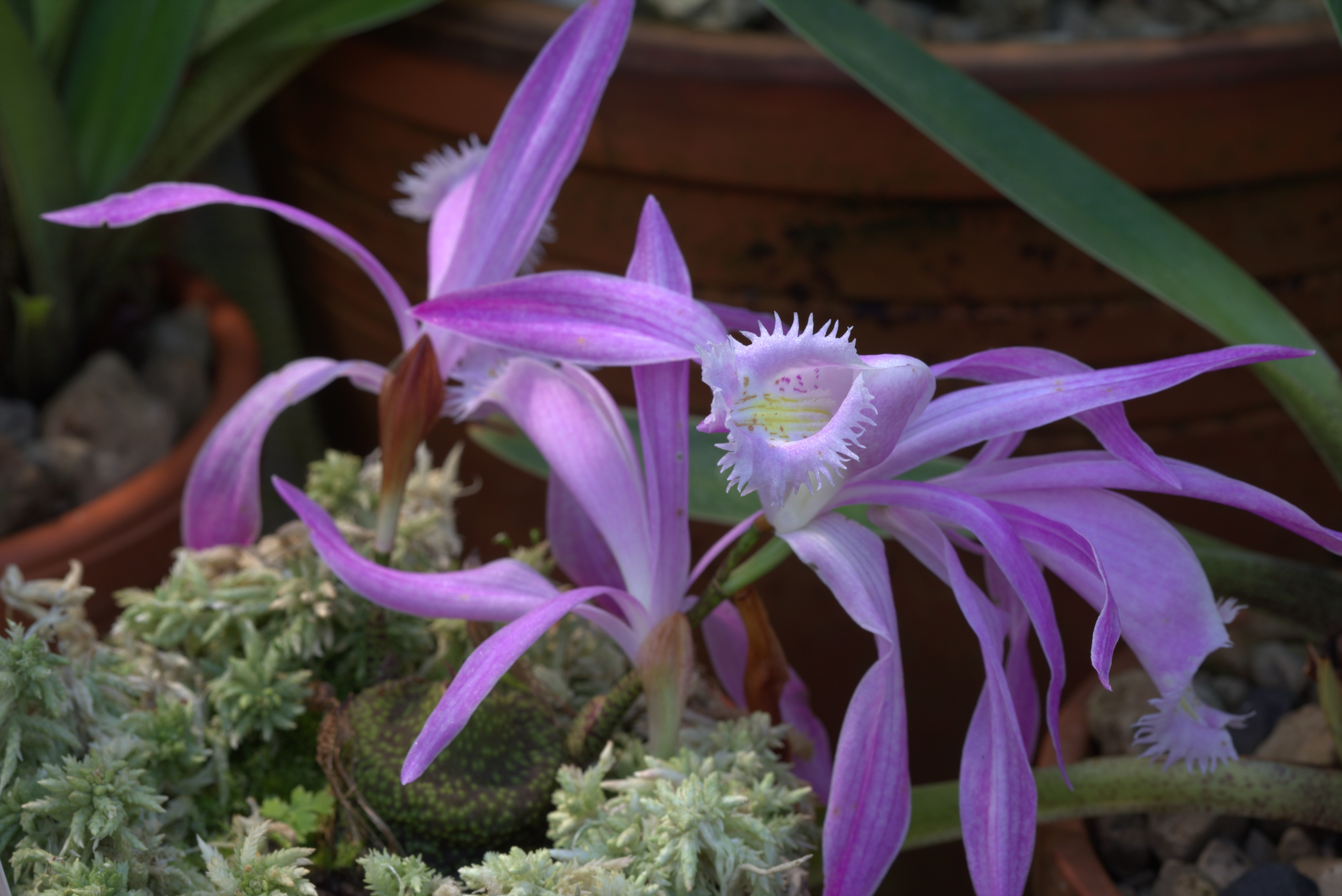
- Illustration of Pleione praecox

Scientific classification
- Kingdom: Plantae
- Clade: Embryophytes
- Clade: Tracheophytes
- Clade: Spermatophytes
- Clade: Angiosperms
- Clade: Monocots
- Order: Asparagales
- Family: Orchidaceae
- Subfamily: Epidendroideae
- Tribe: Arethuseae
- Genus: Pleione
- Species: P. praecox

Binomial name
- Pleione praecox (Sm.) D.Don

Synonyms
- Epidendrum praecox Sm. (basionym); Coelogyne birmanica Rchb.f.; Coelogyne praecox (Sm.) Lindl.; Coelogyne praecox var. sanguinea Lindl.; Coelogyne praecox var. tenera Rchb.f.; Coelogyne praecox var. wallichiana (Lindl.) Lindl.; Coelogyne reichenbachiana T.Moore & Veitch; Coelogyne wallichiana Lindl.; Cymbidium praecox (Sm.) Lindl.; Dendrobium praecox (Sm.) Sm.; Pleione birmanica (Rchb.f.) B.S.Williams; Pleione concolor B.S.Williams; Pleione praecox f. candida (Pfitzer) O.Gruss & M.Wolff; Pleione praecox var. alba E.W.Cooper; Pleione praecox var. candida Pfitzer; Pleione praecox var. reichenbachiana (T.Moore & Veitch) Torelli & Riccab.; Pleione reichenbachiana (T.Moore & Veitch) Kuntze; Pleione wallichiana (Lindl.) Lindl. & Paxton

= Pleione praecox =

Species of orchid

Pleione praecox is a species of orchid found from the west-central Himalaya to China (southern Yunnan). It is the type species of the genus Pleione.

== Images ==
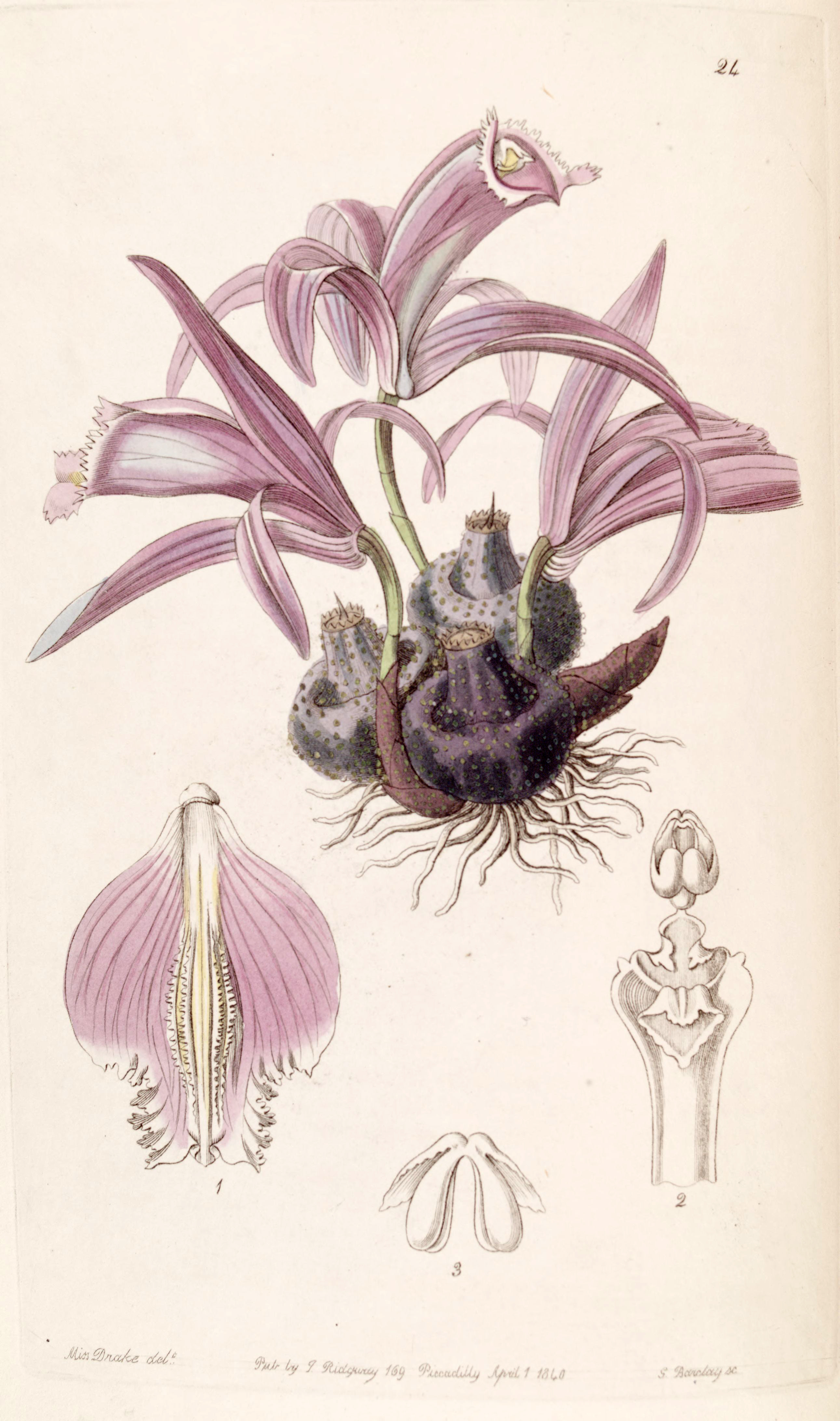
