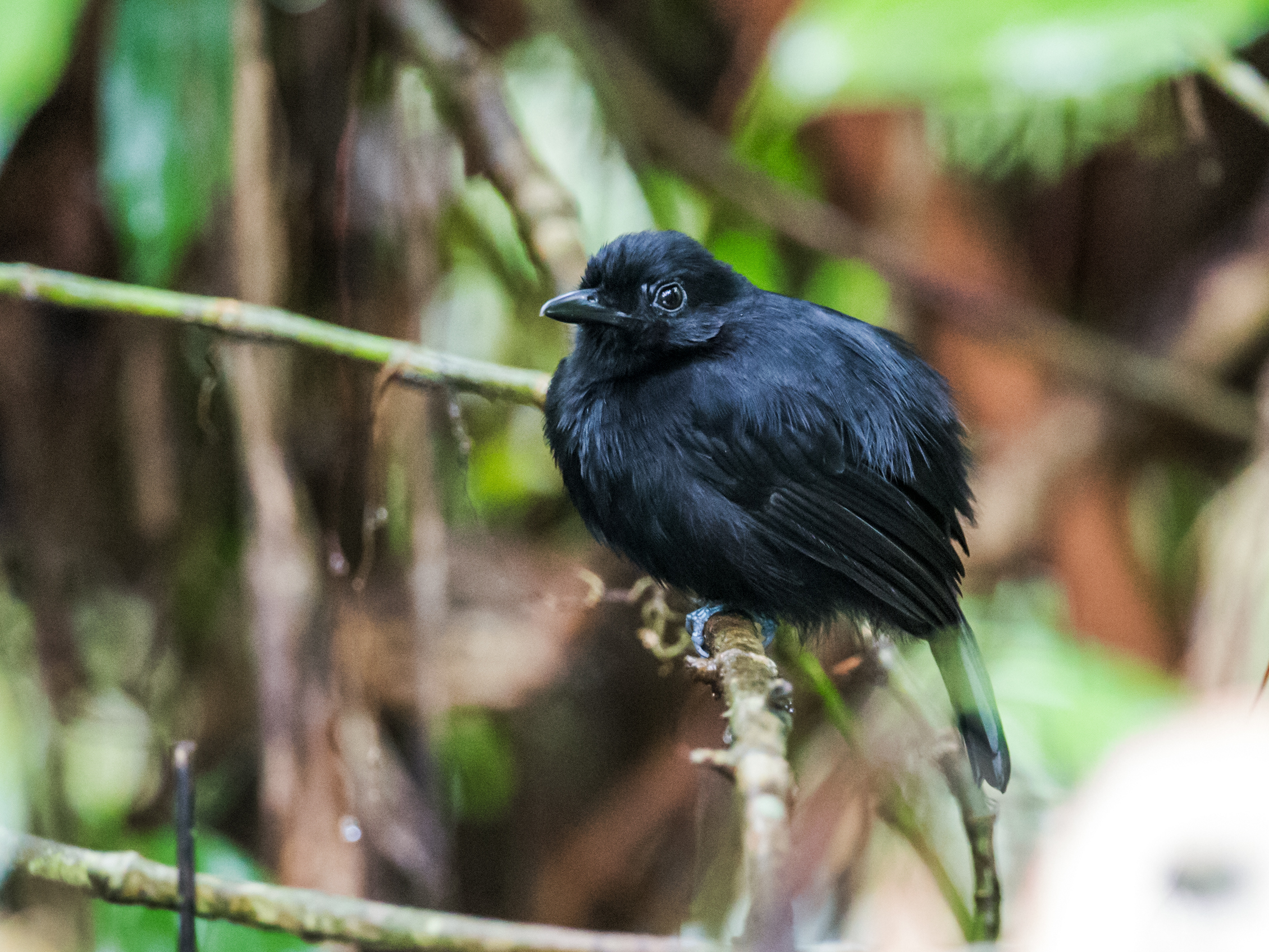
- Male
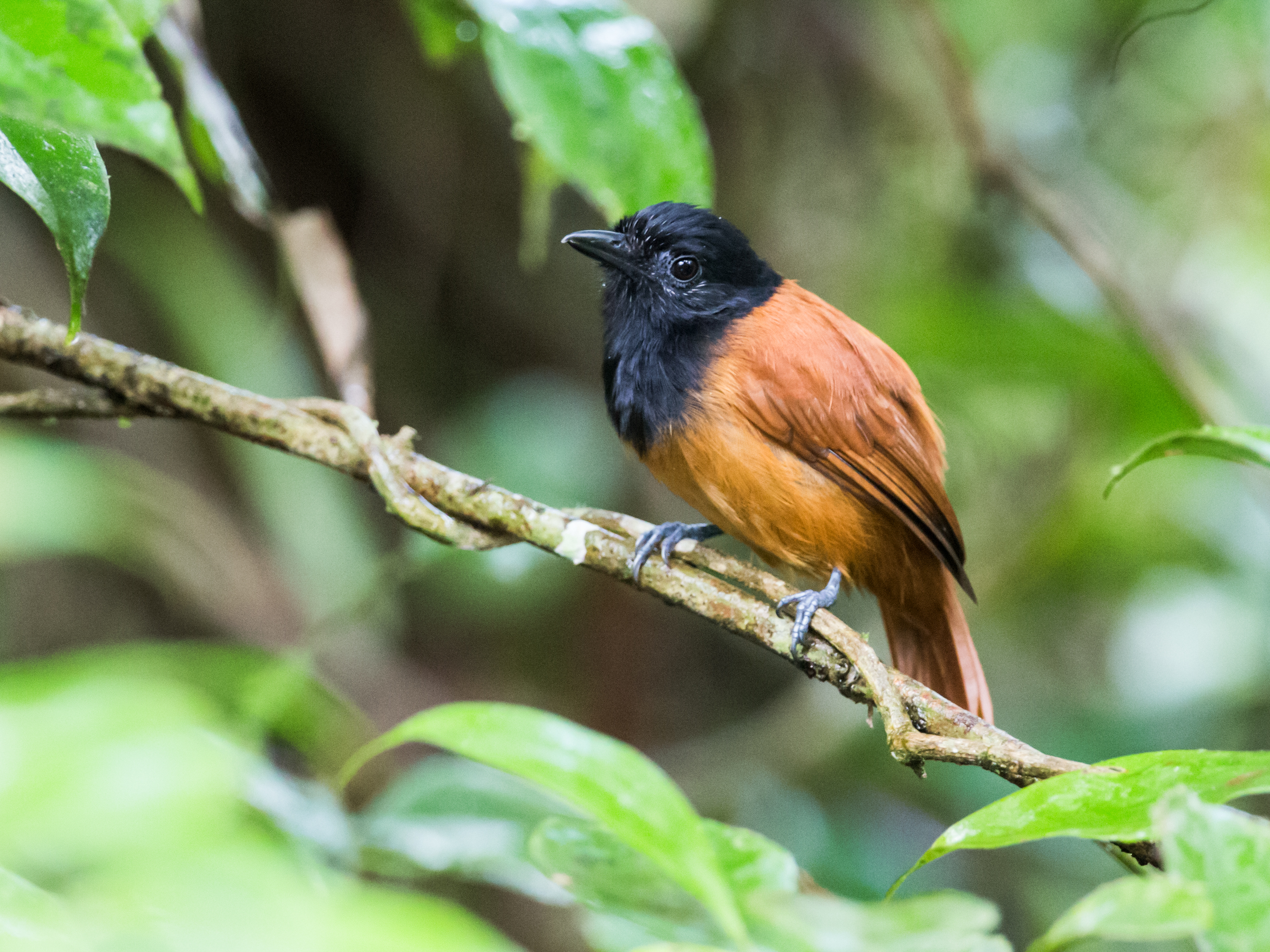
- Female

Conservation status
- Near Threatened (IUCN 3.1)

Scientific classification
- Kingdom: Animalia
- Phylum: Chordata
- Class: Aves
- Order: Passeriformes
- Family: Thamnophilidae
- Genus: Thamnophilus
- Species: T. praecox

Binomial name
- Thamnophilus praecox Zimmer, 1937

= Cocha antshrike =

Species of bird

The cocha antshrike (Thamnophilus praecox) is a Near Threatened species of bird in subfamily Thamnophilinae of family Thamnophilidae, the "typical antbirds". It is found in Colombia, Ecuador, and Peru.

== Taxonomy and systematics ==
The cocha antshrike is monotypic. It and the black antshrike (T. nigriceps) are sister species.

== Description ==
The cocha antshrike is about 16 cm (6.3 in) long. Members of genus Thamnophilus are largish members of the antbird family; all have stout bills with a hook like those of true shrikes. This species exhibits sexual dimorphism. Adult males are entirely black except that their underwing coverts are white, a feature that is seldom visible in the field. Adult females have a black head, throat, and upper breast. Some individuals have faint white streaks on their throat. The rest of their body, their wings, and their tail are cinnamon-rufous; their underparts are slightly paler than their back.

== Distribution and habitat ==
The cocha antshrike was long thought to be endemic to northeastern Ecuador, where it occurs locally along the Rio Napo and its tributaries. The International Ornithological Committee lists it that way. However, by 2021 the South American Classification Committee of the American Ornithological Society (SACC) had recognized that it also occurred further upstream in that river system in extreme south-central Colombia. In March 2024 the SACC recognized documented records from Peru. In late 2023 the Clements taxonomy revised its range statement to read "northeastern Ecuador (locally along the Río Napo and its tributaries in eastern Napo and eastern Sucumbíos) and adjacent Colombia (locally in Putumayo and southwestern Caqueta); disjunctly in northern Peru (on the Canal de Puinahua, in south-central Loreto)".

The cocha antshrike is found along blackwater rivers, usually small ones, in seasonally flooded várzea forest. It favors dense thickets and tangles. In elevation it occurs between about 160 and 300 m (500 and 1,000 ft) above sea level.

== Behavior ==
=== Movement ===
The cocha antshrike is presumed to be a year-round resident throughout its range.

=== Feeding ===
The cocha antshrike's diet is not known but is assumed to be insects and other arthropods. It usually forages singly or in pairs and seldom joins mixed-species feeding flocks. It forages in dense vegetation where it hops among branches to glean prey.

=== Breeding ===
Nothing is known about the cocha antshrike's breeding biology.

=== Vocalization ===
The cocha antshrike's song is "a hollow, evenly paced ko-ko-ko-ko-ko-ko-ko-ko-ko-ko"; it sometimes follows it with a shorter and higher pitched version of the song. Its calls include "a mellow 'pwow-pwow' and a more trilled 'krrrrrr' ".

== Status ==
The IUCN has assessed the cocha antshrike as Near Threatened. It has a very limited range and its estimated population of 8000 mature individuals is believed to be decreasing. "Deforestation is extensive in the western part of the range (particularly in Ecuador) due to the expansion of oil exploration...[v]ast areas of pristine habitat however remain in the eastern part of the range." Though the cocha antshrike was described for science in 1937, it was known only from the holotype until 1990, when it was rediscovered near where that specimen had been collected. It is considered fairly common but local in Ecuador and Peru.
