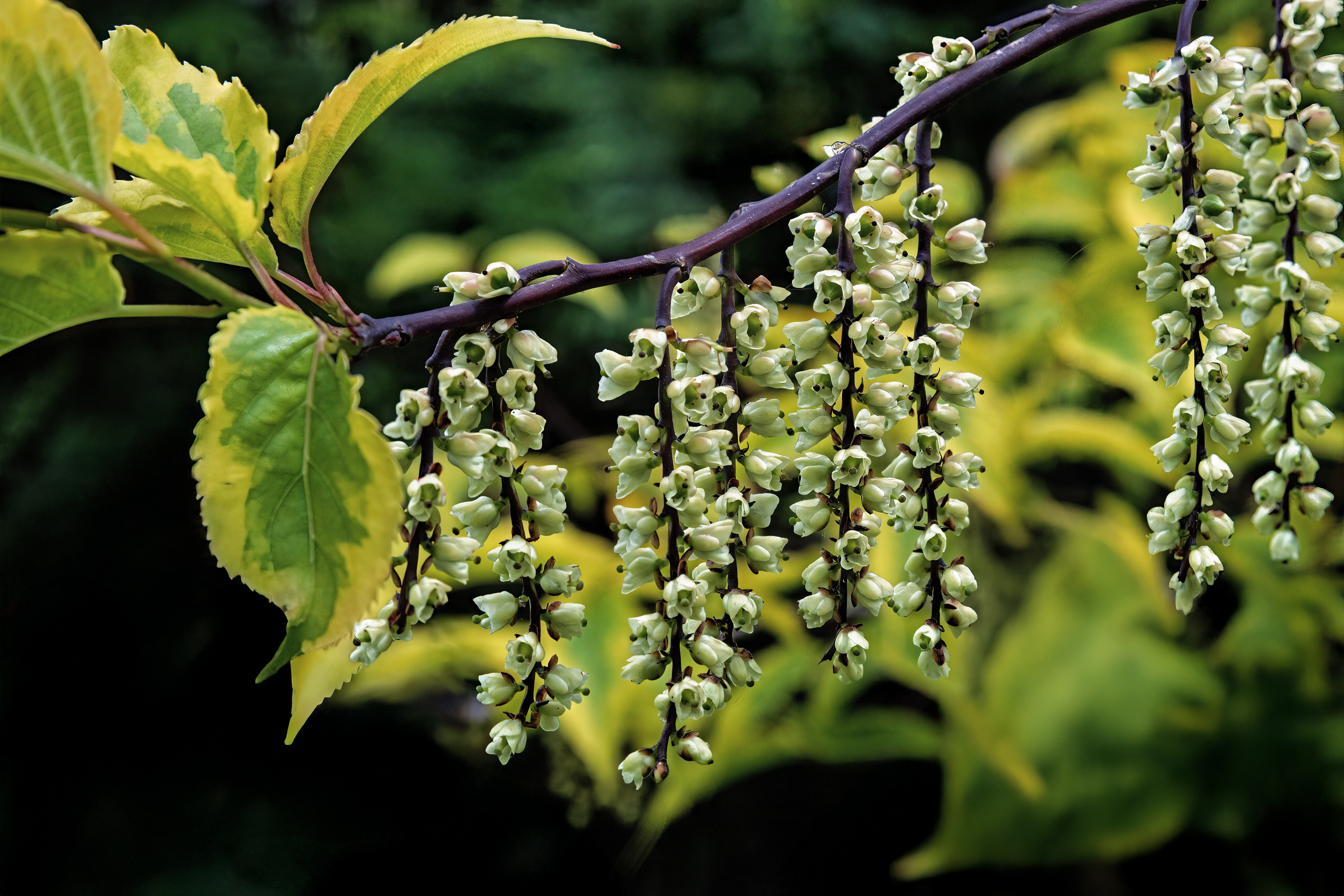

Scientific classification
- Kingdom: Plantae
- Clade: Embryophytes
- Clade: Tracheophytes
- Clade: Spermatophytes
- Clade: Angiosperms
- Clade: Eudicots
- Clade: Rosids
- Order: Crossosomatales
- Family: Stachyuraceae
- Genus: Stachyurus
- Species: S. chinensis

Binomial name
- Stachyurus chinensis Franch.

= Stachyurus chinensis =

Species of flowering plant

Stachyurus chinensis (中国旌节花), Chinese stachyurus, is a species of flowering plant in the family Stachyuraceae, native to China and Taiwan. It is a spreading deciduous shrub growing to 2.5 m (8 ft) tall by 4 m (13 ft) wide. Stiff, pendent racemes of bell-shaped, greenish-yellow flowers are borne on glossy, dark brown branches in winter and spring. It flowers two weeks later than the related S. praecox. The flowers are followed by simple ovate leaves which colour to pink and red before falling in autumn.

The Latin specific epithet chinensis means "from China". This is the most widely distributed species of the genus, and is found throughout southern and eastern China as well as the island of Taiwan. It is also highly variable, with some populations on the mainland more closely resembling S. himalaicus. The two species may be better regarded as conspecific.

This plant is cultivated as an ornamental subject in temperate parks and gardens. Although hardy, it prefers a sheltered location, and is suitable for training against a wall. It needs an acid or neutral soil. Two cultivars have gained the Royal Horticultural Society's Award of Garden Merit:

- 'Celina' (flower racemes longer than the species)
- 'Joy Forever' (leaves spotted and flecked with yellow)
