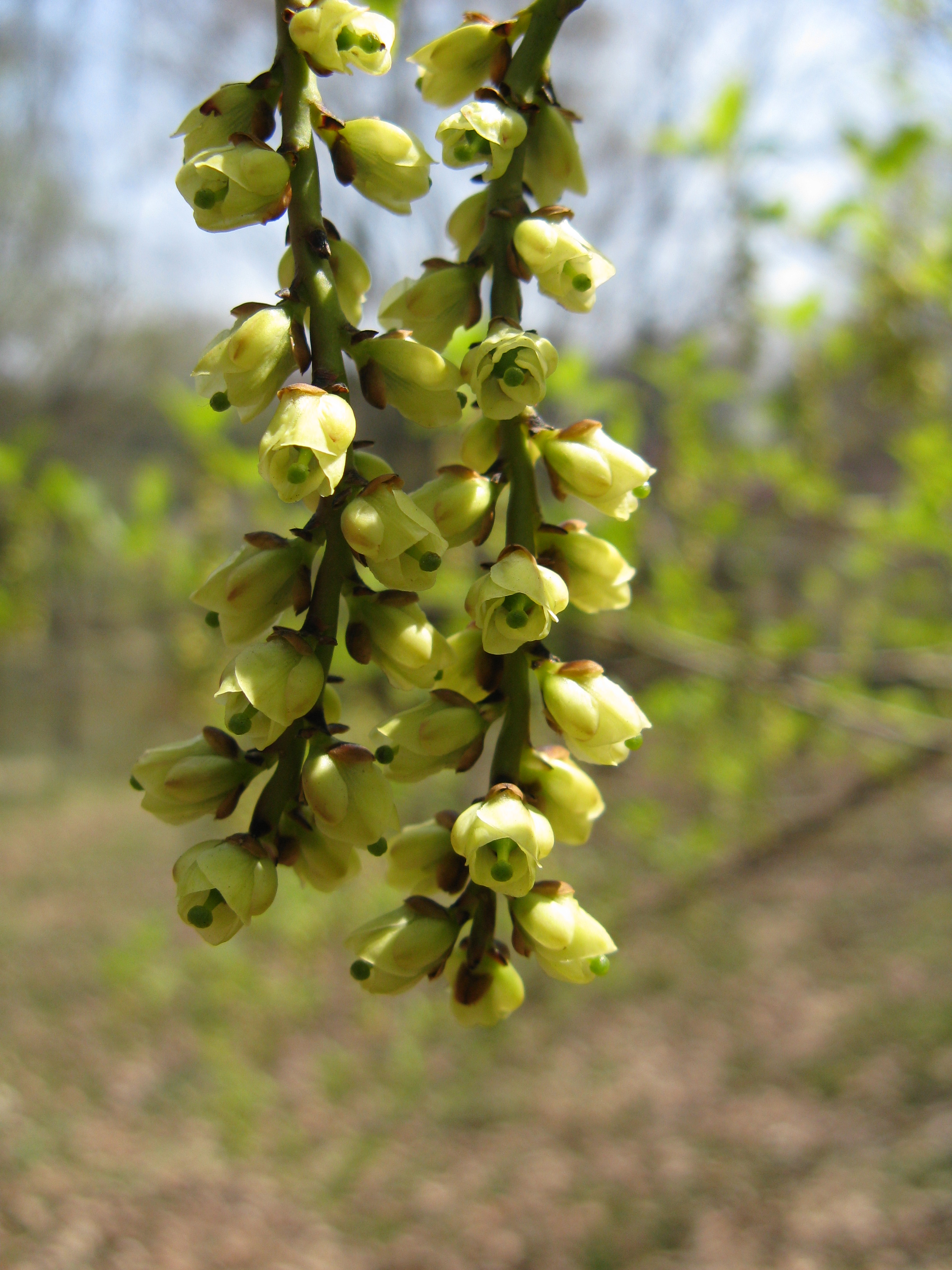
- Stachyurus praecox flowers

Scientific classification
- Kingdom: Plantae
- Clade: Embryophytes
- Clade: Tracheophytes
- Clade: Spermatophytes
- Clade: Angiosperms
- Clade: Eudicots
- Clade: Rosids
- Order: Crossosomatales
- Family: Stachyuraceae; J.Agardh
- Genus: Stachyurus; Siebold & Zucc.

Species
- See text

= Stachyurus =

Genus of flowering plants

Stachyurus is the only genus in the flowering plant family Stachyuraceae, native to the Himalayas and eastern Asia. They are deciduous shrubs or small trees with pendent racemes of 4-petalled flowers which appear on the bare branches before the leaves. The plants have leaves with serrate margins.

Pendunculagin, casuarictin, strictinin, casuarinin and casuariin are ellagitannins found in species in this genus.

Stachyurus praecox and the slightly later-flowering S. chinensis, from Japan and China, respectively, are both cultivated as ornamental plants elsewhere as they flower early in temperate climates.

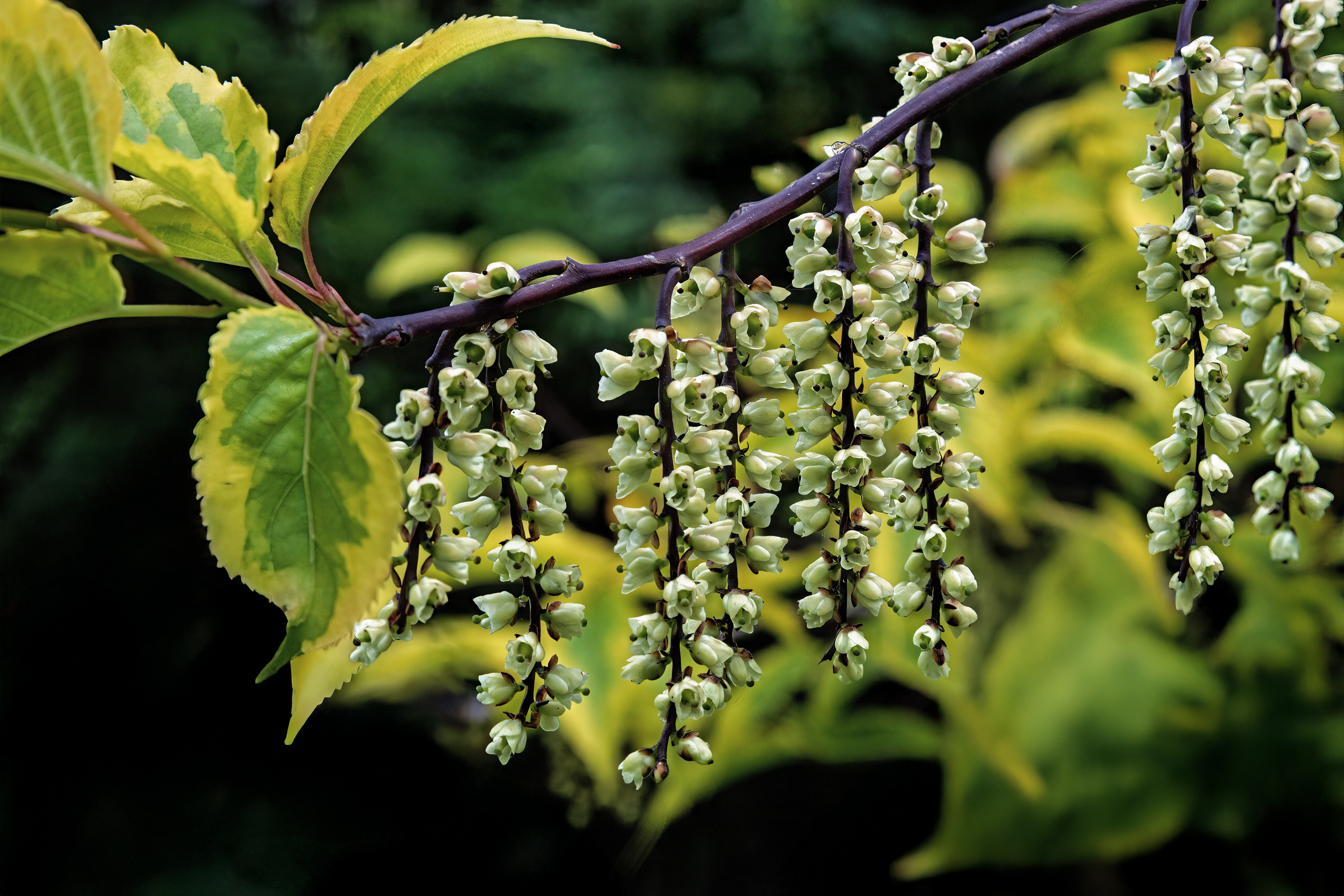
Stachyurus chinensis

== Species list ==
- Stachyurus chinensis
- Stachyurus coaetaneus
- Stachyurus cordatulus
- Stachyurus himalaicus
- Stachyurus obovatus
- Stachyurus praecox
- Stachyurus retusus
- Stachyurus salicifolius
- Stachyurus yunnanensis
