= Celosia whitei =

Scientific classification
- Kingdom: Plantae
- Clade: Tracheophytes
- Clade: Angiosperms
- Clade: Eudicots
- Order: Caryophyllales
- Family: Amaranthaceae
- Genus: Celosia
- Species: C. whitei

Binomial name
- Celosia whitei W.F.Grant, 1961

Species of flowering plant

Celosia whitei, is a species of flowering plant in the amaranth family, Amaranthaceae. It was described in 1961 by William F. Grant, as Celosia whiteii. The plant was named in honor of Orland E. White.
