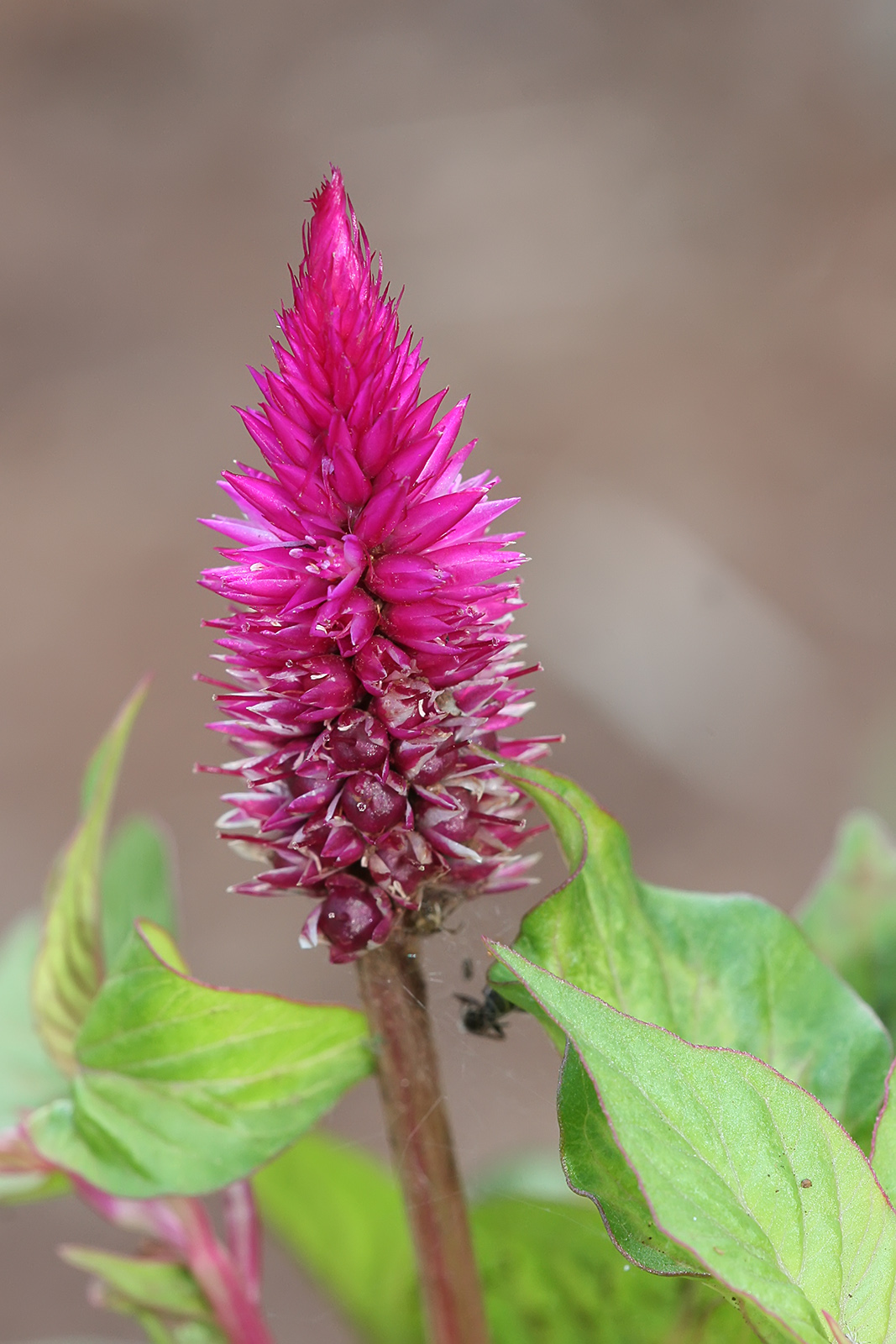
- Celosia spicata

Scientific classification
- Kingdom: Plantae
- Clade: Tracheophytes
- Clade: Angiosperms
- Clade: Eudicots
- Order: Caryophyllales
- Family: Amaranthaceae
- Subfamily: Amaranthoideae
- Genus: Celosia; L.

= Celosia =

Genus of flowering plants

Celosia (/siːˈloʊʃiə/ see-LOH-shee-ə) is a small genus of edible and ornamental plants in the amaranth family, Amaranthaceae. Its species are commonly known as woolflowers, or, if the flower heads are crested by fasciation, cockscombs. The plants are well known in East Africa's highlands and are used under their Swahili name, mfungu.

== Taxonomy ==
The generic name is derived from the Ancient Greek word κήλεος (kḗleos), meaning "burning", and refers to the colourful flame-like flower heads.

== Uses ==
=== As a garden plant ===
The plant is an annual. Seed production in these species can be very high, 200–700 kg per hectare. One ounce of seed may contain up to 43,000 seeds. One thousand seeds can weigh 1.0–1.2 grams. Depending upon the location and fertility of the soil, blossoms can last 8–10 weeks.

C. argentea and C. cristata are common garden ornamental plants.

=== As food ===
Celosia argentea var. argentea or Lagos spinach (a.k.a. quail grass, soko, celosia, feather cockscomb) is a broadleaf annual leaf vegetable. It grows widespread across Mexico, where it is known as "velvet flower", northern South America, tropical Africa, the West Indies, South, East and Southeast Asia where it is grown as a native or naturalized wildflower, and is cultivated as a nutritious leafy green vegetable. It is traditional fare in the countries of Central and West Africa, and is one of the leading leafy green vegetables in Nigeria, where it is known as "soko yokoto", meaning "make husbands fat and happy". In Spain it is known as "Rooster comb" because of its appearance.

As a grain and like the related quinoa, Celosia is a pseudo-cereal, not a true cereal.

These leaves, young stems and young inflorescences are used for stew, as they soften up readily in cooking. The leaves also have a soft texture and a mild spinach-like taste.

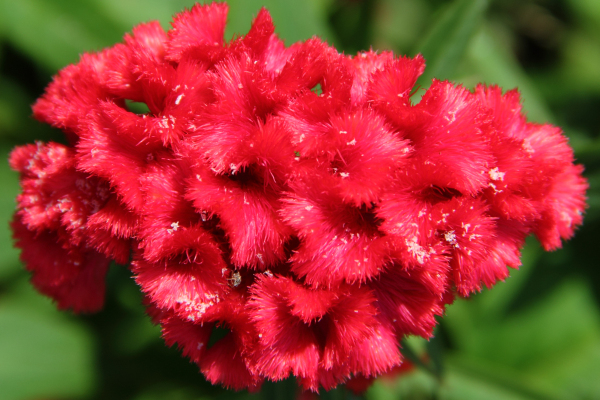
Flower of Celosia cristata

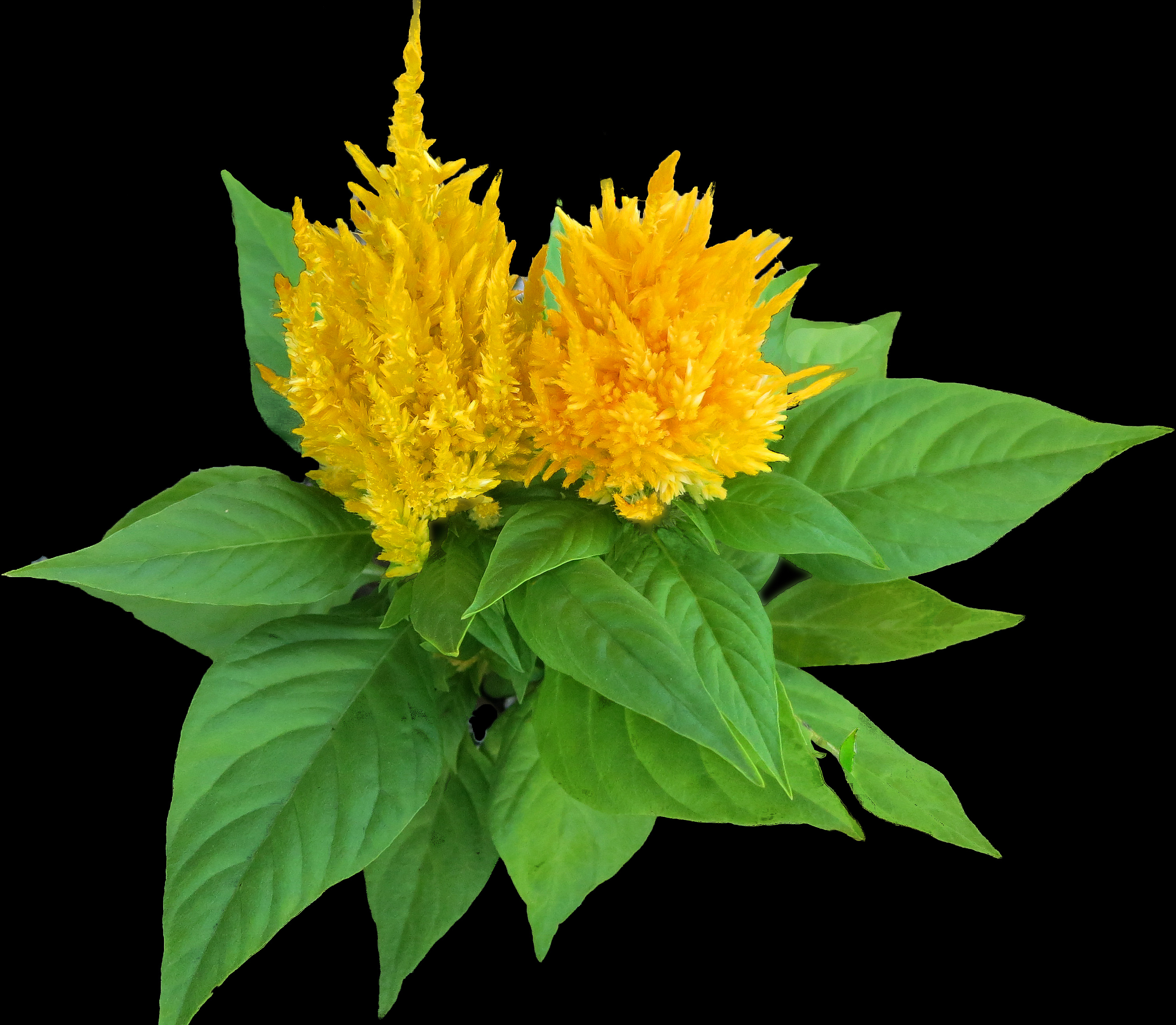
Woolflower or cockscomb—Celosia plumosa

== Cultivation ==
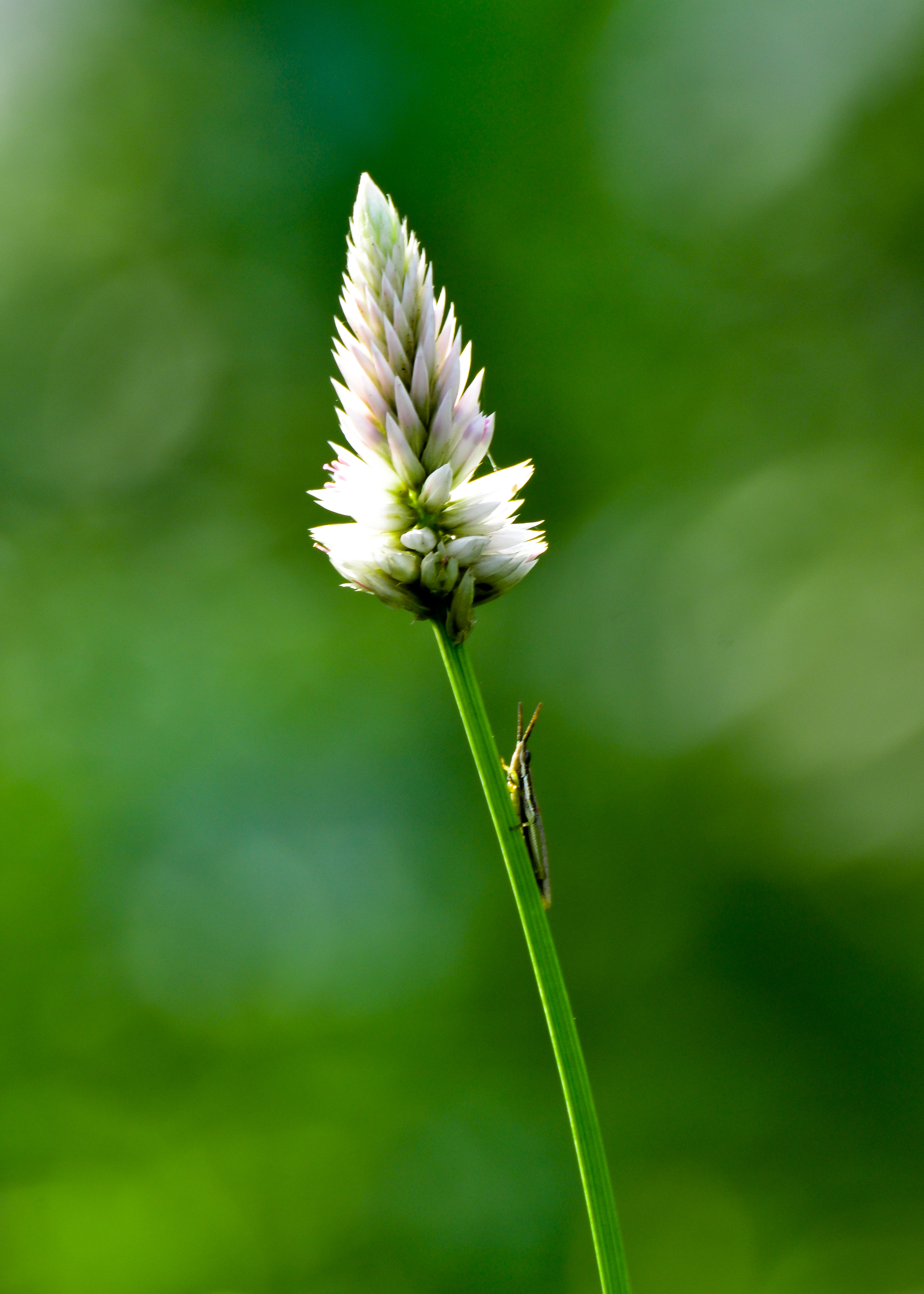
Silver cockscomb Celosia argentea in Tirunelveli, India

Despite its African origin (a claim that is not without dispute), Celosia is known as a foodstuff in Indonesia and India. Moreover, in the future it might become more widely eaten, especially in the hot and malnourished regions of the equatorial zone. In that regard, it has already been hailed as the often-wished-for vegetable that "grows like a weed without demanding all the tender loving care that other vegetables seem to need".

Works well in humid areas and is the most-used leafy plant in Nigeria. It grows in the wet season and grows well while other plants succumb to mold and other diseases like mildew. Though a very simple plant, Celosia does need moderate soil moisture.

== Cultural symbolism ==
The genus Celosia is also recognized as an important cultural symbol in Cebu, Philippines. The local government of Cebu City, together with Sinulog Foundation Incorporated (SFI), declared the Celosia flower as the official flower of the Sinulog Festival, the grandest festival in the Philippines held in honor of Santo Niño every third Sunday of January. The reason for the move was that the flowers' colors, which are predominantly red and yellow, resemble the colors of the cape, crown, and other regalia of the Infant Jesus. Celosia argentea flowers are still grown seasonally in Sirao Garden, located Barangay Sirao, Cebu City.

== Selected species ==
- Celosia argentea L.
  - Celosia argentea var. cristata (formerly Celosia cristata)
- Celosia floribunda A. Gray
- Celosia isertii C.C.Towns.
- Celosia leptostachya Benth.
- Celosia nitida Vahl
- Celosia odorata T.Cooke
- Celosia palmeri S.Watson
- Celosia spicata L.
- Celosia trigyna L.
- Celosia virgata Jacq.
- Celosia whitei W.F.Grant

=== Formerly placed here ===
- Chamissoa altissima (Jacq.) Kunth (as C. tomentosa Humb. & Bonpl. ex Schult.)
- Deeringia amaranthoides (Lam.) Merr. (as C. baccata Retz.)
- Deeringia polysperma (Roxb.) Moq. (as C. polysperma Roxb.)
- Iresine diffusa Humb. & Bonpl. ex Willd. (as C. paniculata L.)

== Images ==
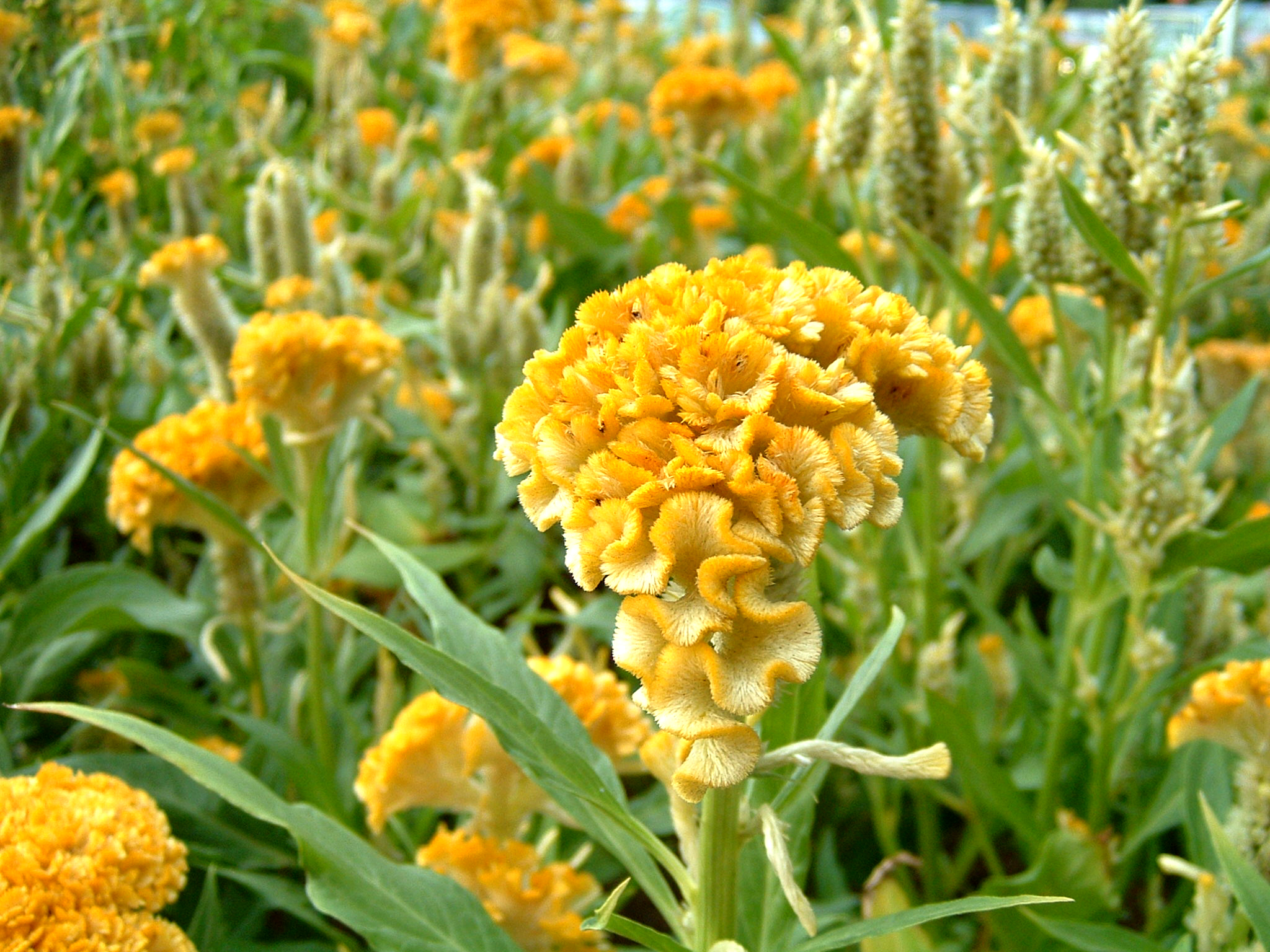
Celosia cristata. Common name yellow toreador.

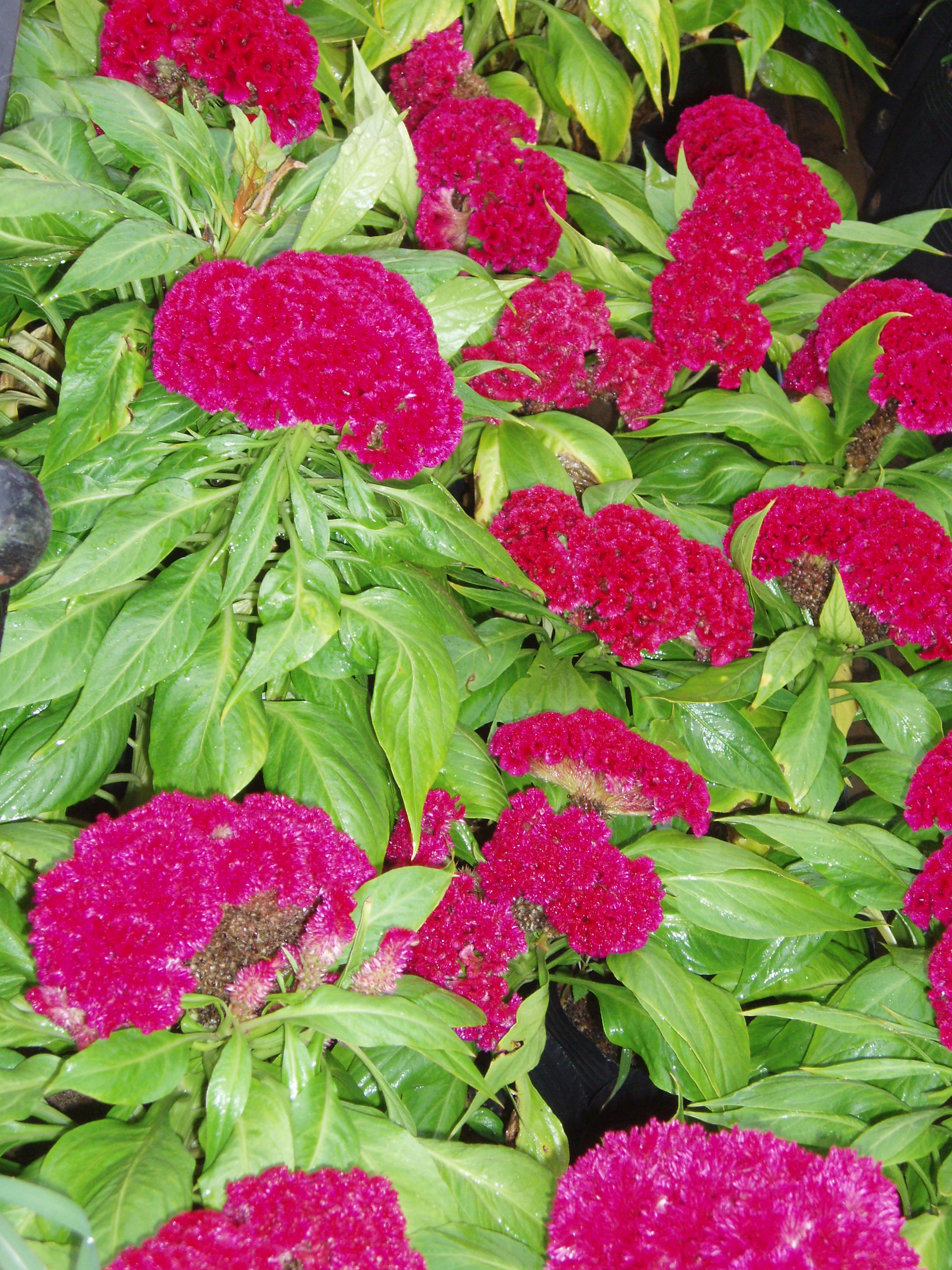
Red cockscomb

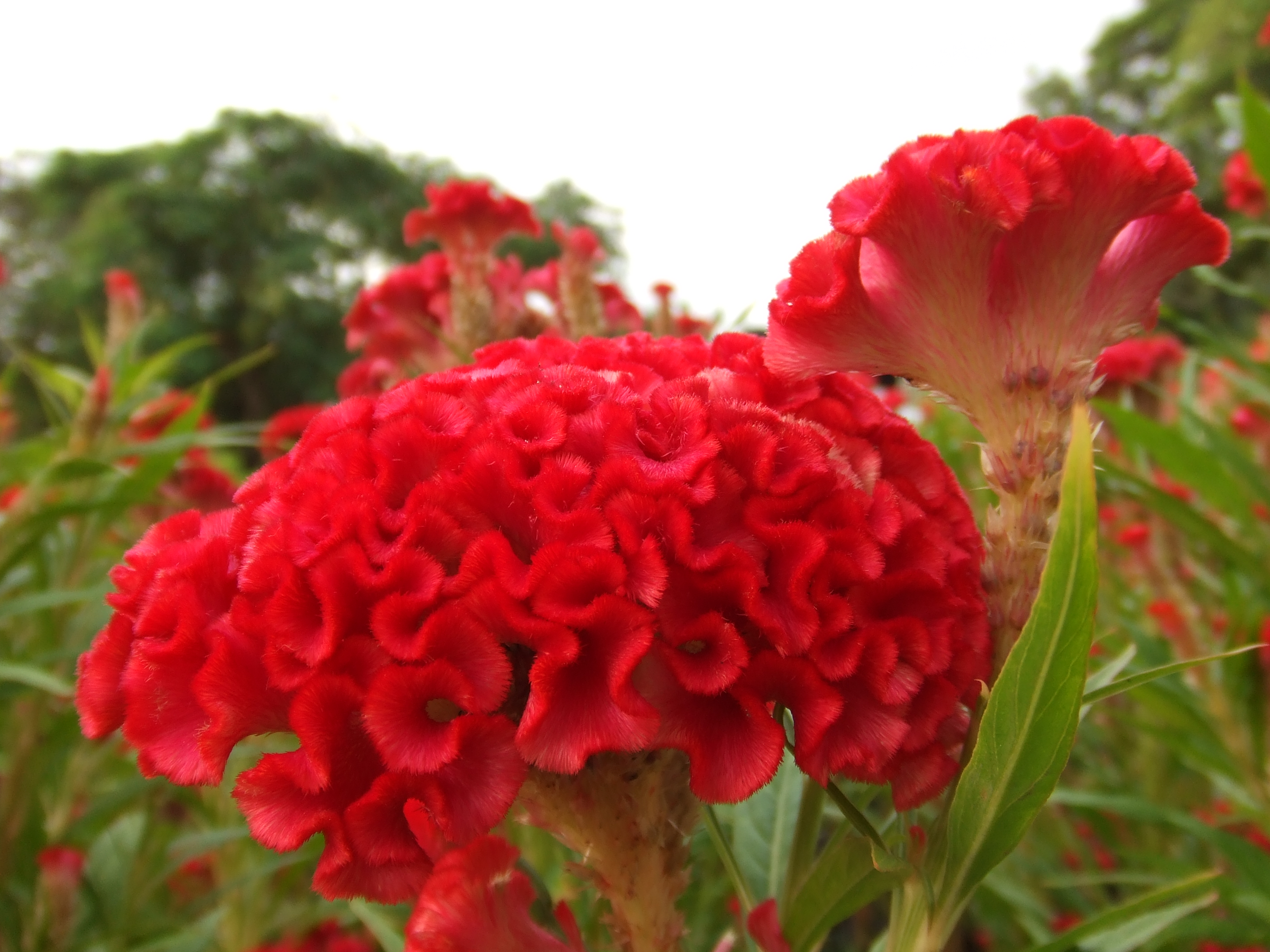
A close view of red cockscombs

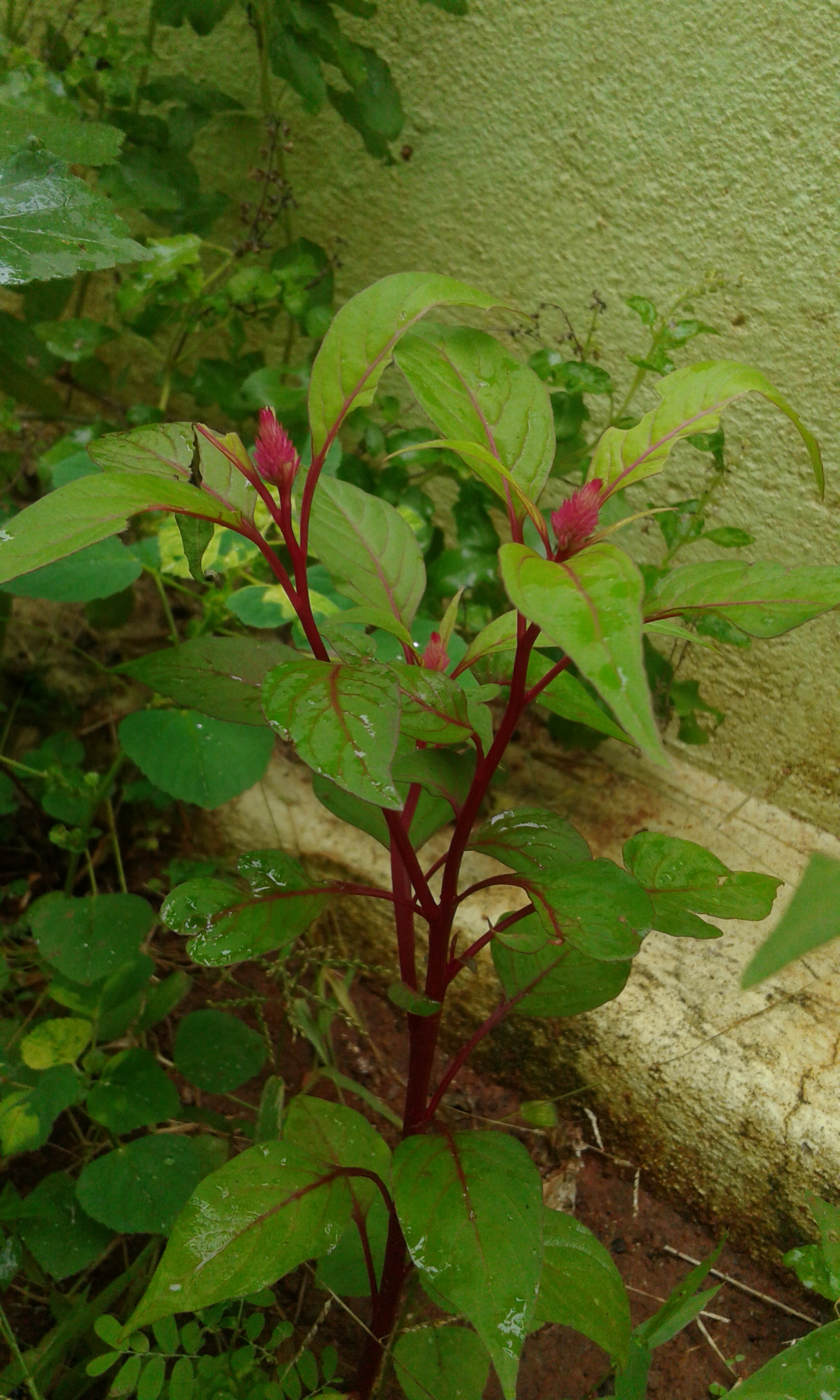
Celosia flower

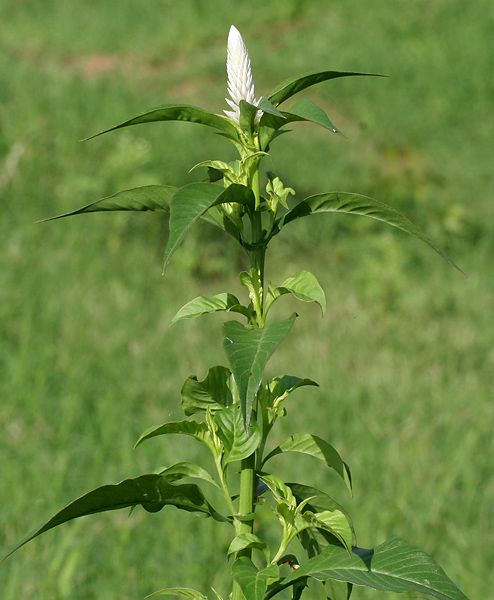
Silver cockscomb Celosia argentea

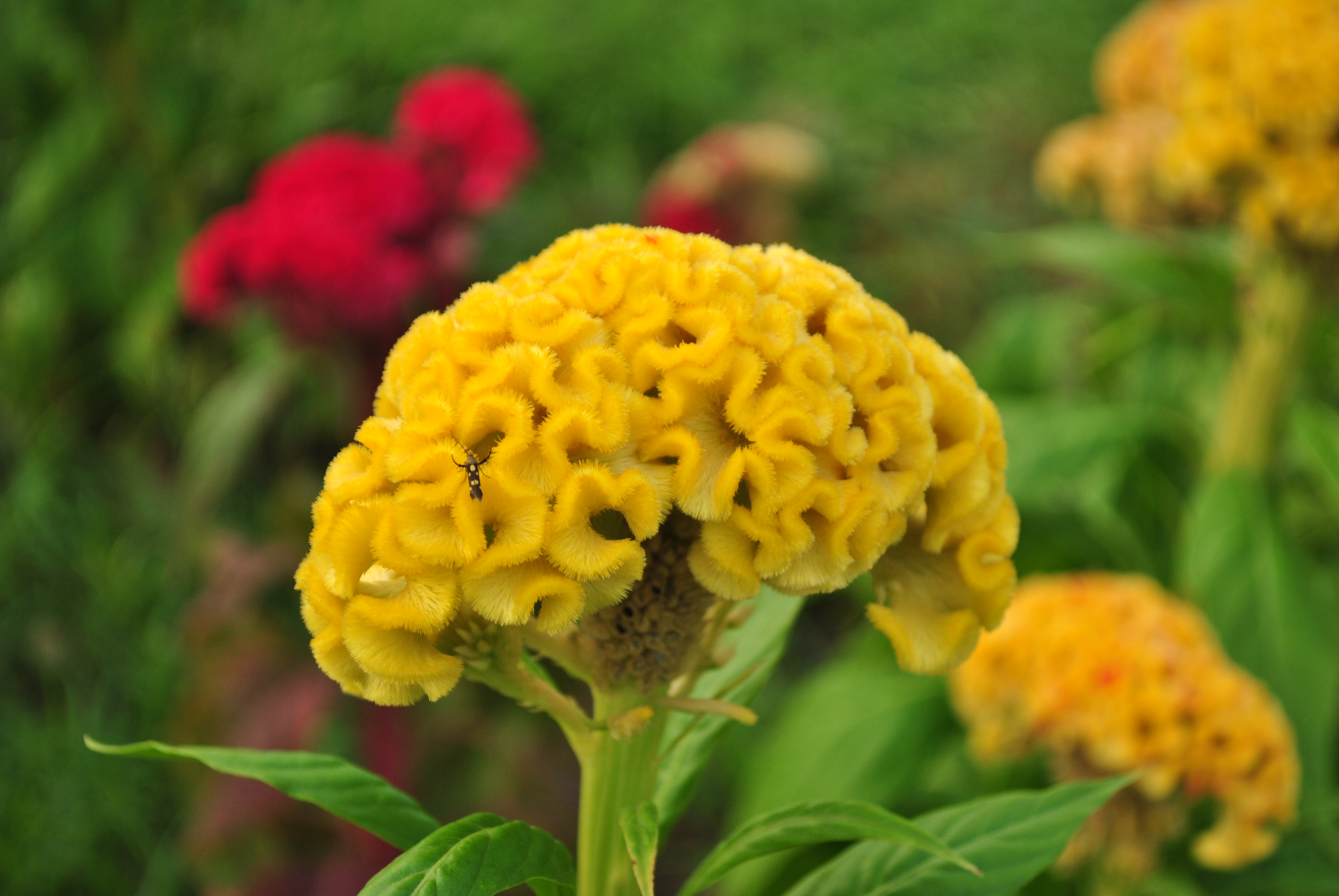
Celosia cristata

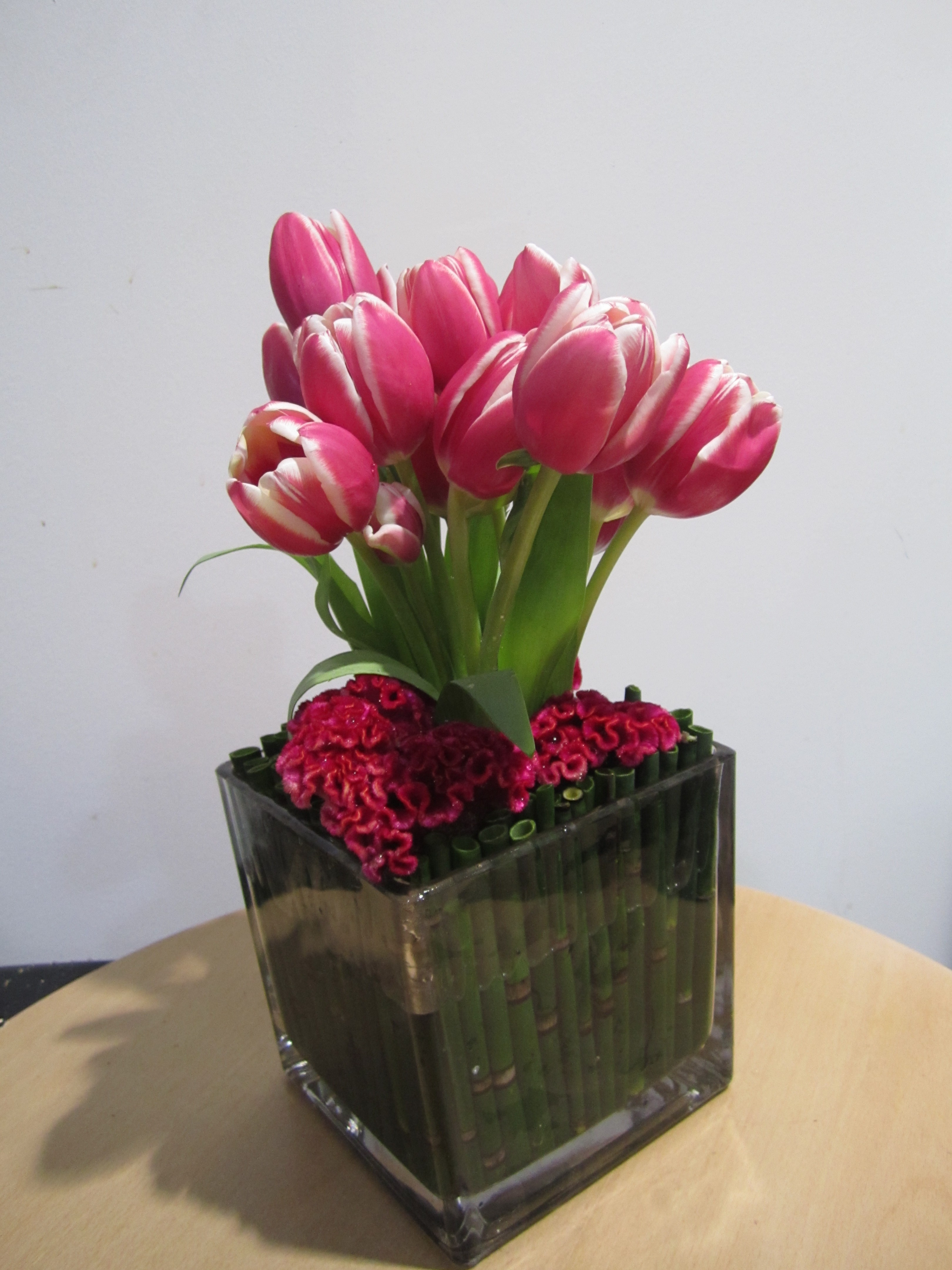

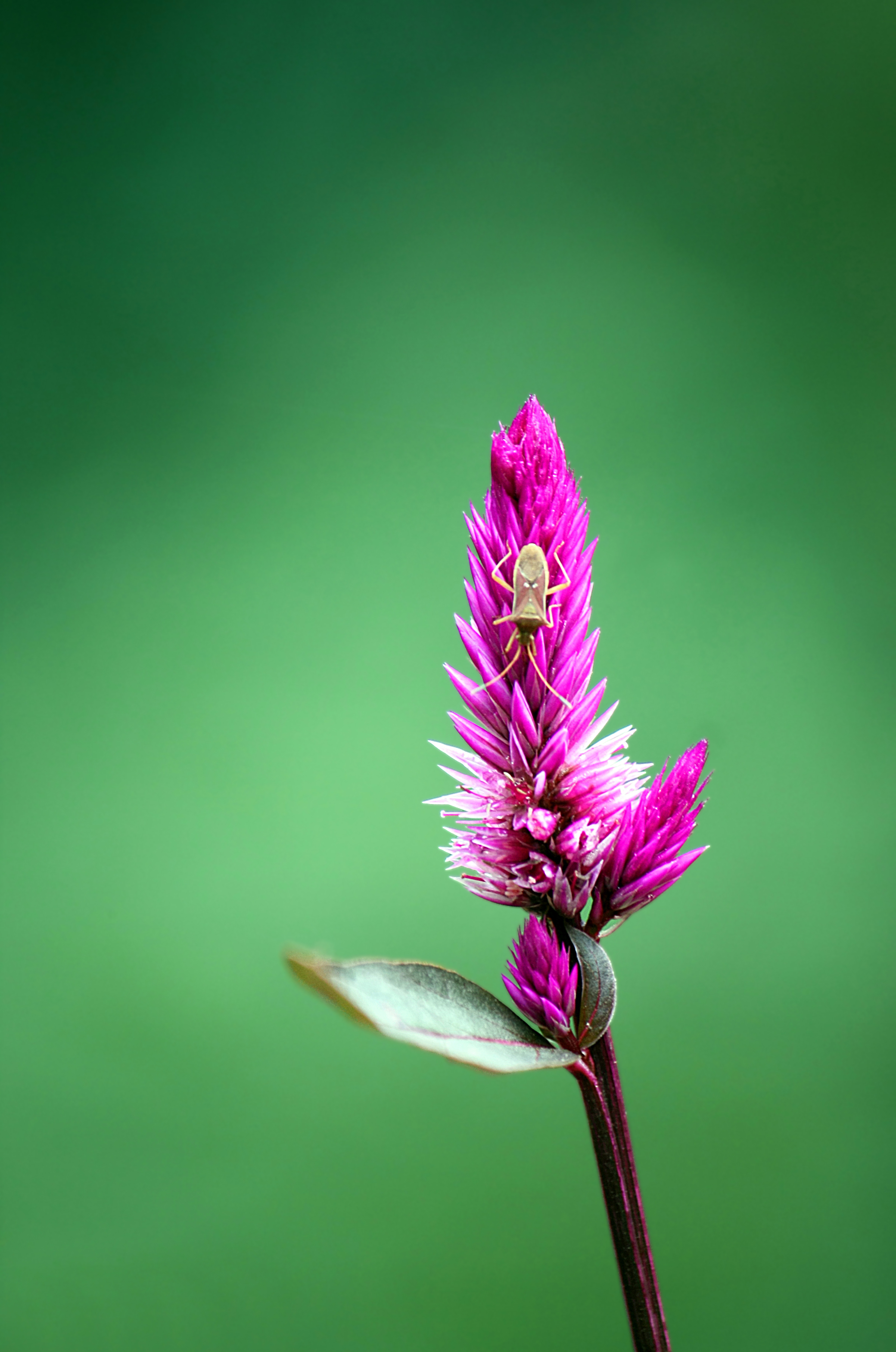
Plumed cockscomb flower and an insect

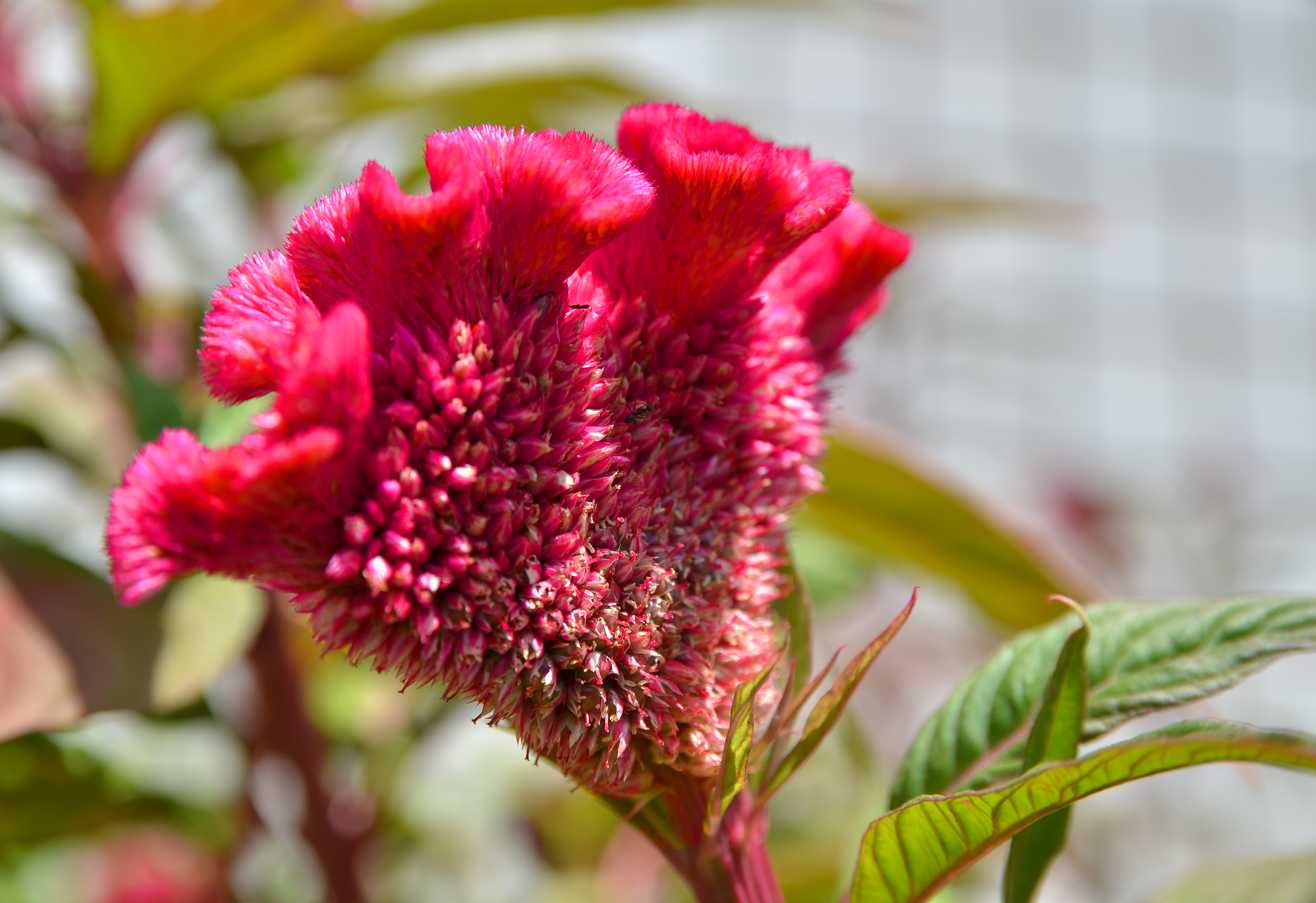
Celosia cristata (Cockscomb)

(Dragons Breath)
