= Albahaca =

Albahaca may refer to:

- Ocimum campechianum ("albahaca de monte"), widespread across the Americas from Mexico southward.
- Ocimum basilicum, which is the basil ingredient for cooking, grown worldwide.
- Celosia virgata, a shrub found in Puerto Rico and the Virgin Islands.
Plants named Albahaca
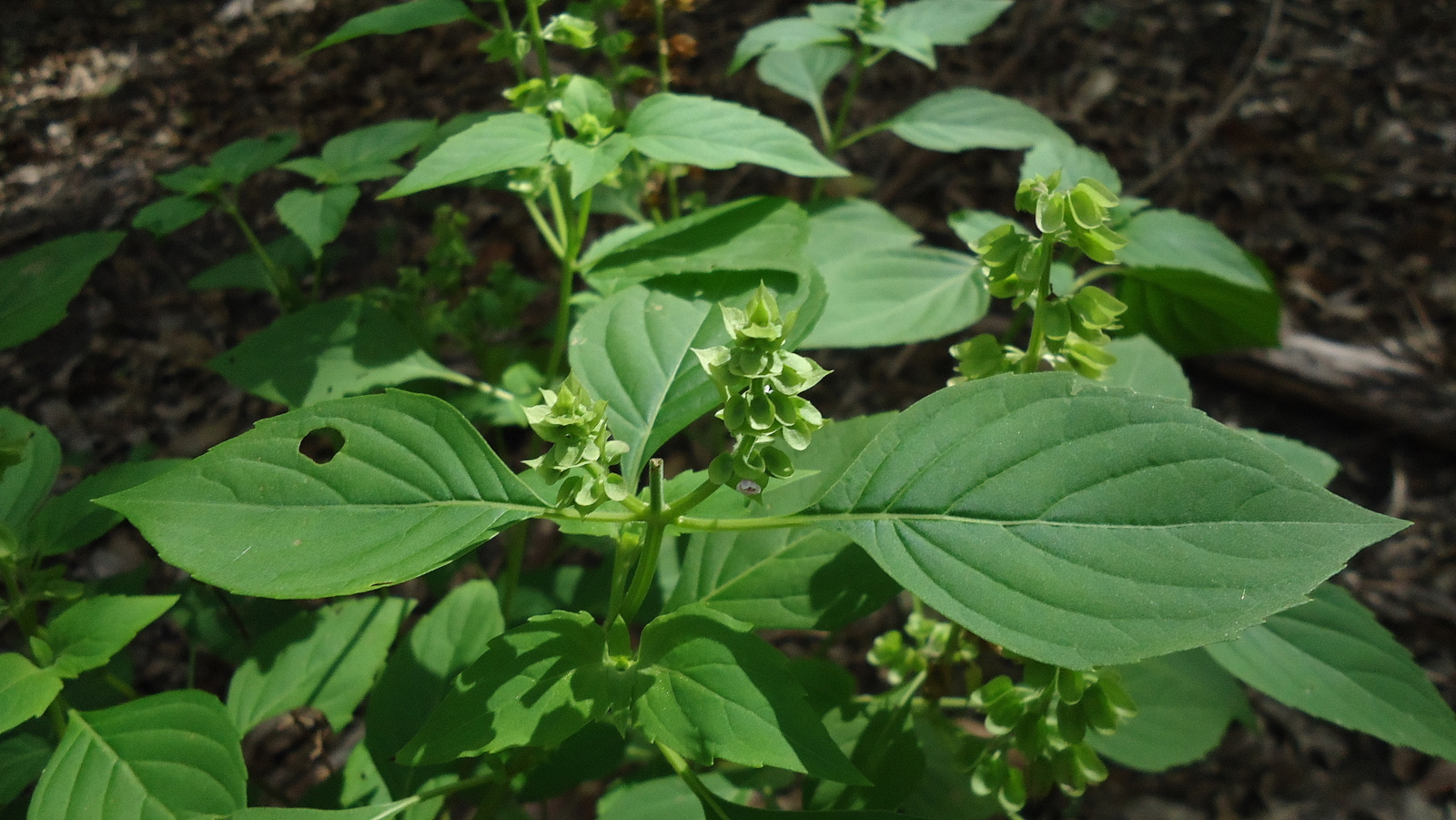
Ocimum campechianum

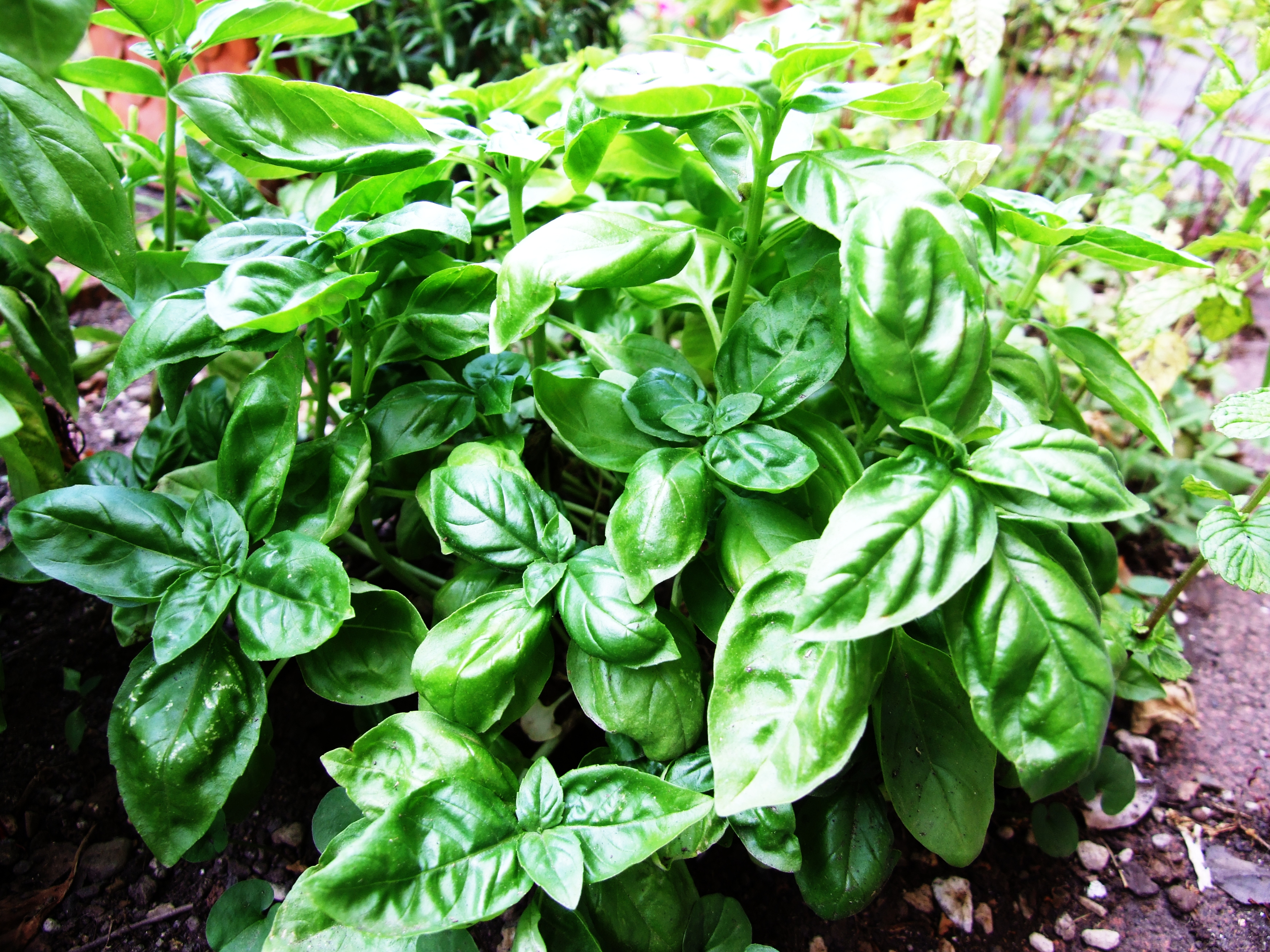
Basil (Ocimum basilicum)
