= C. nitida =

C. nitida may refer to:

- Celosia nitida, the West Indian cockscomb, a plant species
- Coelogyne nitida, an orchid species
- Cotinis nitida, a beetle species

== See also ==
- Nitida (disambiguation)
