= Celosia palmeri =

Scientific classification
- Kingdom: Plantae
- Clade: Embryophytes
- Clade: Tracheophytes
- Clade: Angiosperms
- Clade: Eudicots
- Order: Caryophyllales
- Family: Amaranthaceae
- Genus: Celosia
- Species: C. palmeri

Binomial name
- Celosia palmeri S.Watson

Species of flowering plant

Celosia palmeri, commonly known as Palmer's cockscomb, is a species of flowering plant in the amaranth family, Amaranthaceae, that is native to the lower Rio Grande Valley of Texas in the United States as well as northeastern Mexico. The specific name honours British botanist Edward Palmer (1829–1911), who collected the type specimen in Monclova Municipality, Coahuila in 1880. It is a perennial shrub reaching a height of 0.3–1 m (0.98–3.28 ft). Flowering takes place from summer to winter.
