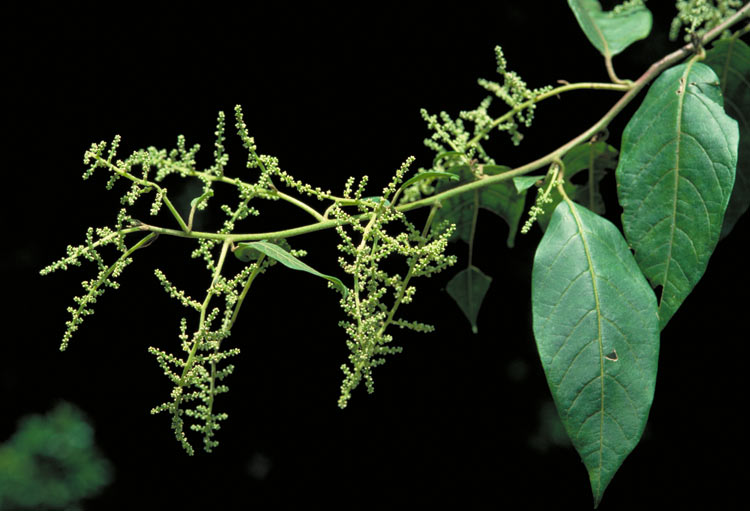
- Flowers and leaves

Conservation status
- Least Concern (NCA)

Scientific classification
- Kingdom: Plantae
- Clade: Tracheophytes
- Clade: Angiosperms
- Clade: Eudicots
- Order: Caryophyllales
- Family: Amaranthaceae
- Genus: Deeringia
- Species: D. arborescens

Binomial name
- Deeringia arborescens Druce

Synonyms
- Lestibudesia arborescens R.Br.; Celosia arborescens Spreng.; Deeringia altissima F.Muell.; Lagrezia altissima Moq.; Lestibudesia altissima A.Cunn. ex Moq.

= Deeringia arborescens =

Species of flowering plant

Deeringia arborescens, commonly known as climbing deeringia, is a species of plant in the family Amaranthaceae. It is native to Sulawesi, the Maluku Islands, Western Australia, Queensland and New South Wales, and grows in well-developed rainforest.

== Description ==
Deeringia arborescens is a vine with a stem diameter up to 13 cm (5.1 in). Leaves are generally about 13 cm (5.1 in) long and 6.5 cm (2.6 in) wide, pointed at the tip and somewhat blunt at the base, with both sides hairy (lower more than the upper). Flowers are borne on panicles up to 13 cm (5.1 in) long and are very small — up to 2.5 mm (0.10 in) diameter.

== Distribution and habitat ==
In Australia it occurs in the Kimberley region of Western Australia and the east coast of Queensland and New South Wales, at altitudes up to about 750 m (2,460 ft). It occupies both well-developed and dryer rainforest, on a variety of substrates.

== Conservation ==
This species is listed as least concern under the Queensland Government's Nature Conservation Act. As of October 2025, it has not been assessed by the International Union for Conservation of Nature (IUCN).
