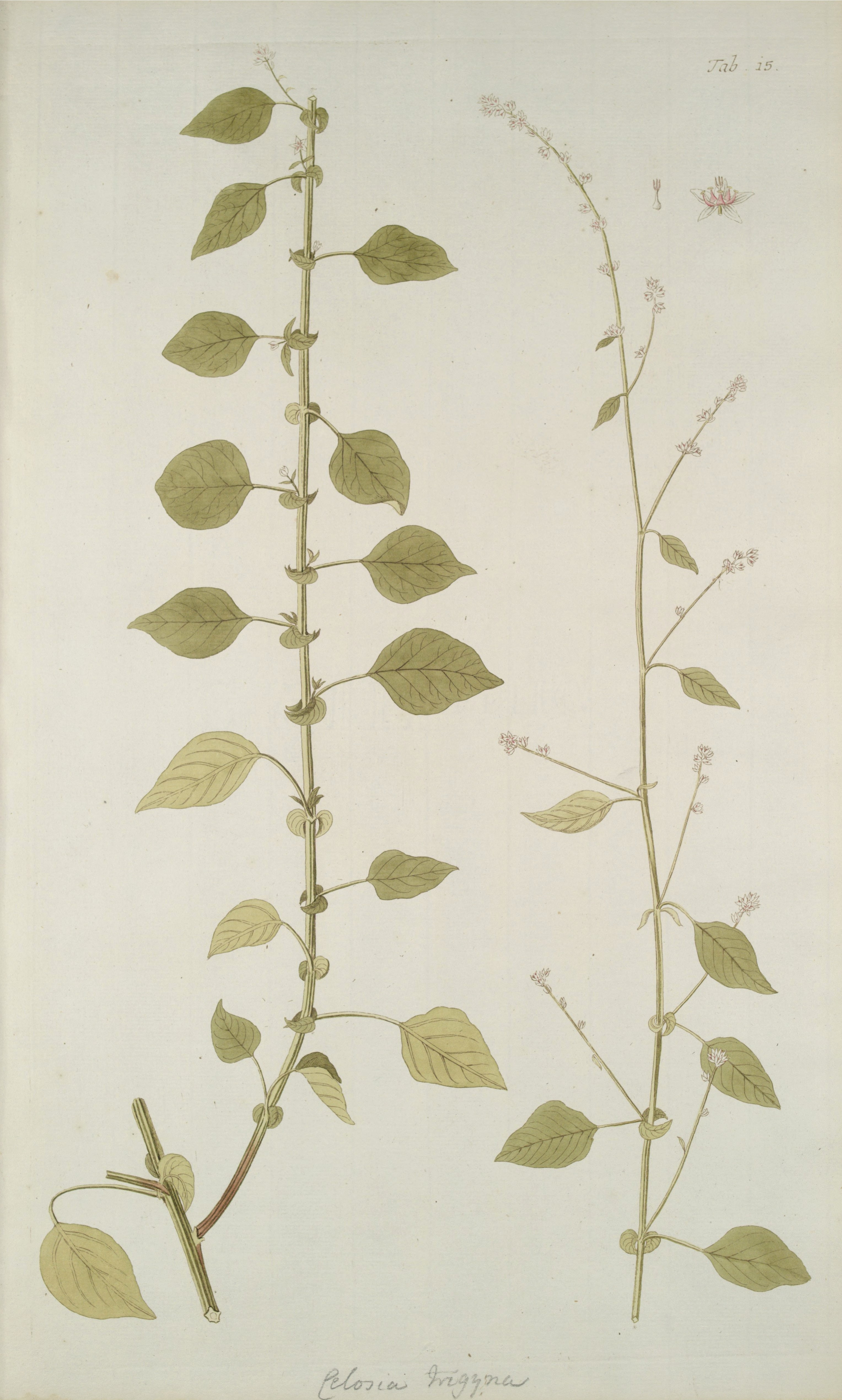

Scientific classification
- Kingdom: Plantae
- Clade: Tracheophytes
- Clade: Angiosperms
- Clade: Eudicots
- Order: Caryophyllales
- Family: Amaranthaceae
- Genus: Celosia
- Species: C. trigyna

Binomial name
- Celosia trigyna L

= Celosia trigyna =

Species of flowering plant

Celosia trigyna is a plant species commonly known as woolflower for its curious flowers.

== Description ==
Celosia trigyna may grow up to 1 m (3 feet) in height and is considered a weed in some regions of the world where it is introduced. It can be grown from seed.

== Use ==
During drought, woolflower has been used as a source of food. The leaves are boiled like cabbage, and is known as torchata.

It is also eaten as a vegetable in Africa.
