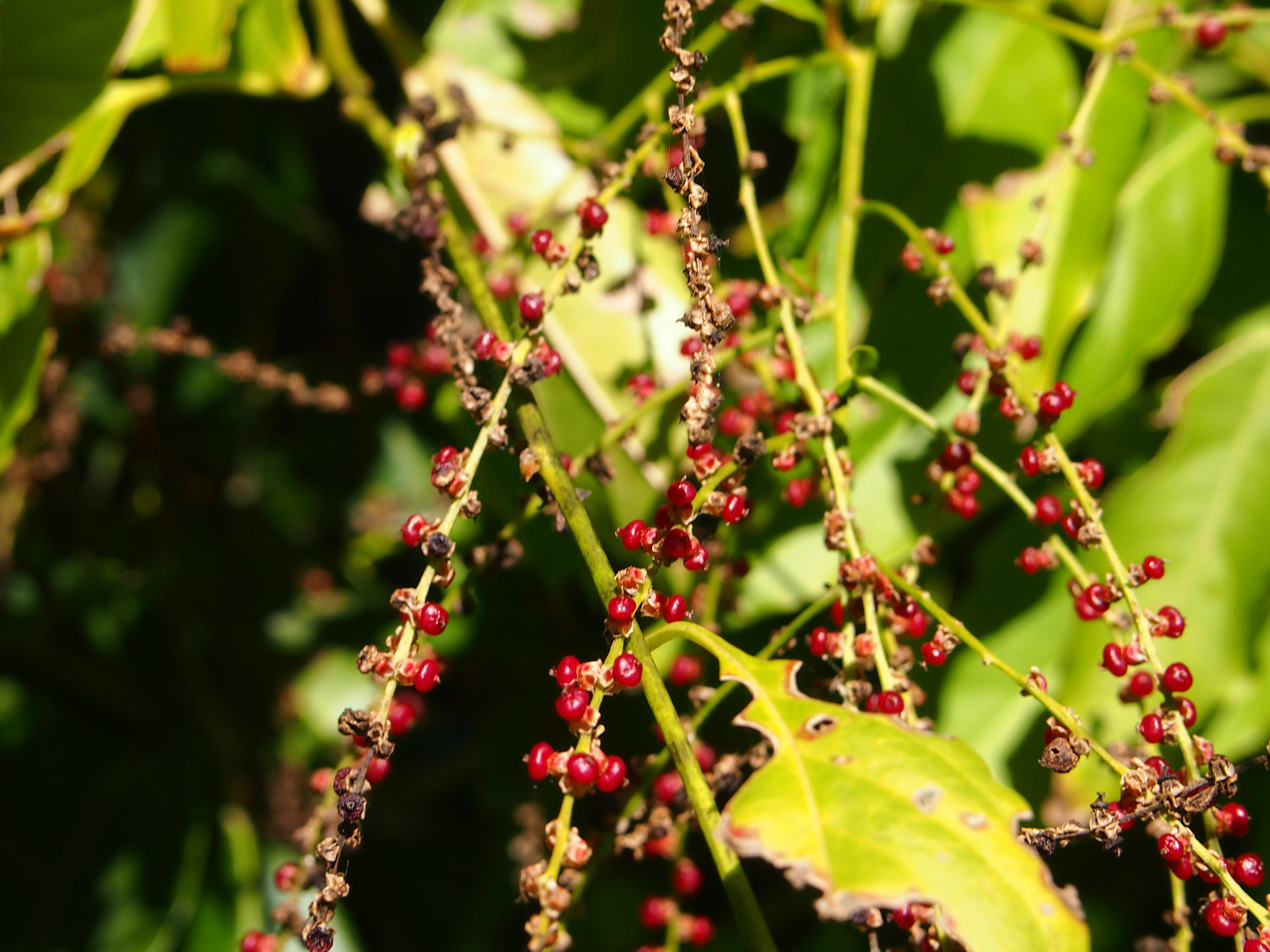
- Deeringia amaranthoides fruit

Scientific classification
- Kingdom: Plantae
- Clade: Tracheophytes
- Clade: Angiosperms
- Clade: Eudicots
- Order: Caryophyllales
- Family: Amaranthaceae
- Subfamily: Amaranthoideae
- Genus: Deeringia; R.Br.

Species
- See text

Synonyms
- Cladostachys D.Don; Coilosperma Raf.; Dendroportulaca Eggli; Lestibudesia Thouars

= Deeringia =

Genus of flowering plants

Deeringia is a genus of flowering plants in the amaranth family Amaranthaceae. Its native range is tropical Asia, western Pacific, Australia and Madagascar.

== Species ==
As of November 2025, Plants of the World Online accepts the following ten species:

- Deeringia amaranthoides (Lam.) Merr.
- Deeringia arborescens (R.Br.) Druce
- Deeringia densiflora Cavaco
- Deeringia humbertiana Cavaco
- Deeringia madagascariensis Cavaco
- Deeringia mirabilis (Eggli) Appleq. & D.B.Pratt
- Deeringia perrieriana Cavaco
- Deeringia polysperma (Roxb.) Moq.
- Deeringia spicata (Thouars) Schinz
- Deeringia tetragyna Roxb.
