= Deeringia mirabilis =

Scientific classification
- Kingdom: Plantae
- Clade: Tracheophytes
- Clade: Angiosperms
- Clade: Eudicots
- Order: Caryophyllales
- Family: Amaranthaceae
- Genus: Deeringia
- Species: D. mirabilis

Binomial name
- Deeringia mirabilis (Eggli) Appleq. & D.B.Pratt

Synonyms
- Dendroportulaca mirabilis Eggli

Species of flowering plant

Deeringia mirabilis is a plant species published in 2005. It is in the family Amaranthaceae and is endemic to Madagascar. It has only been documented Isalo National Park and Zombitse-Vohibasia National Park. Dendroportulaca mirabilis Eggli is a synonym.
