= William F. Grant =

William Frederick Grant (October 20, 1924 – October 6, 2011) was a Canadian plant geneticist, biosystematist, educator, and environmental advocate who developed higher plant species for monitoring and testing for mutagenic effects of environmental pollutants. He has carried out research on the genetics of species of the genus Lotus (Leguminosae) and the forage species Lotus corniculatus (birdsfoot trefoil) developing an innovative procedure for increasing seed production in the legume birdsfoot trefoil.

== Biography ==
Born in Hamilton, Ontario, he received a Bachelor of Arts degree in 1947 from McMaster University and a master's degree in 1949. In 1953, he received a PhD degree from the University of Virginia.

In 1953, he was appointed botanist to the Department of Agriculture, Kuala Lumpur, Malaysia, through the Colombo Technical Cooperation Program under the operation of the Canadian Department of External Affairs, Ottawa. Since 1995 he had been a co-director of the International Program on Plant Bioassays in the use of higher plants in the testing for environmental mutagens in the global environment.

The standard author abbreviation W.F.Grant is used to indicate this person as the author when citing a botanical name.
