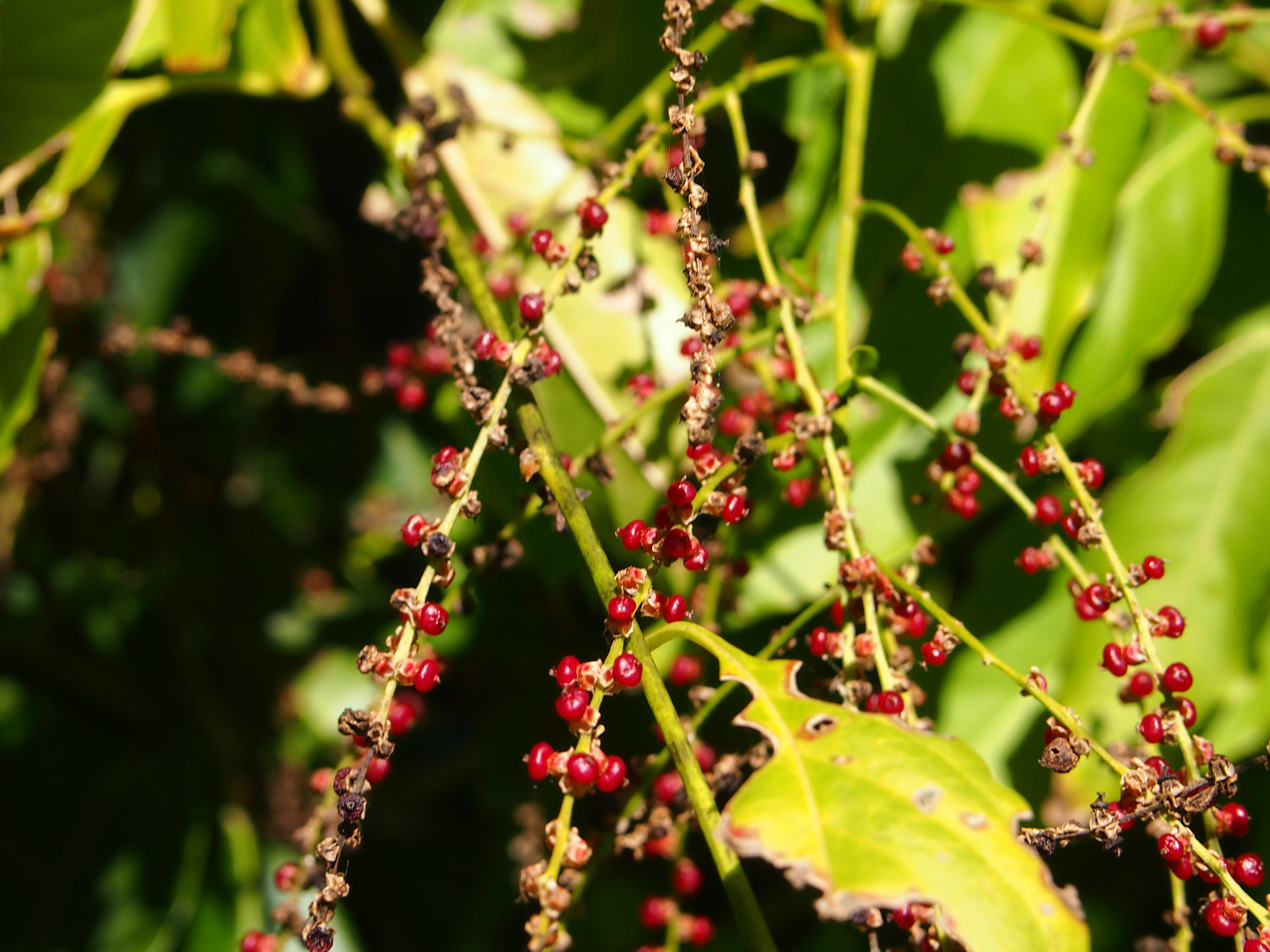
- Deeringia amaranthoides fruit

Scientific classification
- Kingdom: Plantae
- Clade: Embryophytes
- Clade: Tracheophytes
- Clade: Spermatophytes
- Clade: Angiosperms
- Clade: Eudicots
- Order: Caryophyllales
- Family: Amaranthaceae
- Genus: Deeringia
- Species: D. amaranthoides

Binomial name
- Deeringia amaranthoides (Lam.) Merr.

Synonyms
- Achyranthes amaranthoides Lam.; Celosia amaranthoides (Lam.) Medik.; Celosia baccata Retz.; Cladostachys amaranthoides (Lam.) K.C.Kuan; Cladostachys frutescens D.Don; Coilosperma cordata Raf.; Deeringia baccata (Retz.) Moq.; Deeringia celosioides R.Br.; Deeringia indica Retz. ex Blume; Deeringia virgata Zipp. ex Span.; Gomphrena amaranthoides (Lam.) Roth; Phytolacca gracilis Herb. ex Moq.

= Deeringia amaranthoides =

Species of flowering plant

Deeringia amaranthoides is a species of plant in the Amaranthaceae family and is distributed from the western Himalayas east across southern China, down through south east Asia and Indonesia, across New Guinea to parts of Australia.

It was first described as Achyranthes amaranthoides by Jean-Baptiste Lamarck in 1785 and reclassified as Deeringia amaranthoides by Elmer Drew Merrill in 1917.
