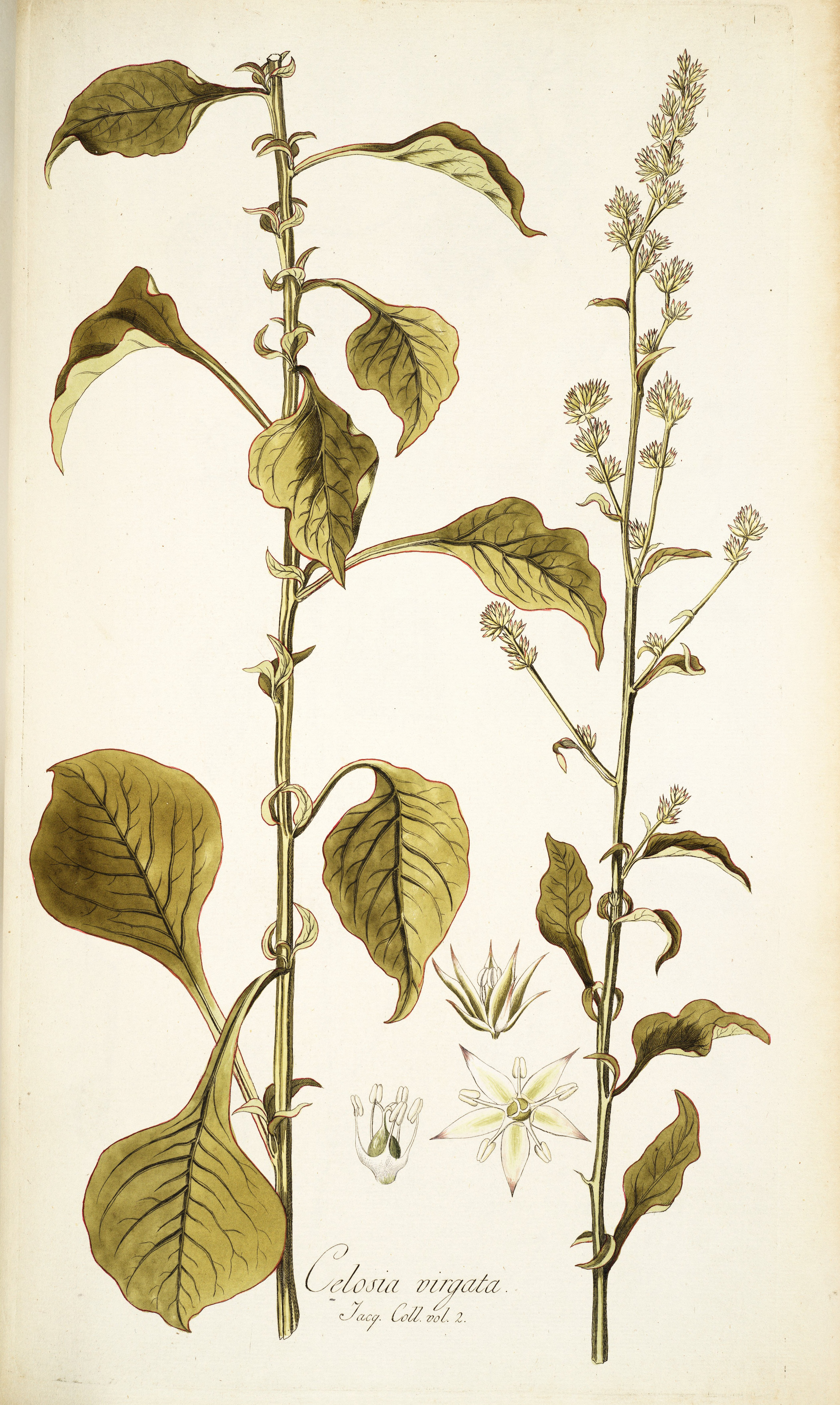

Scientific classification
- Kingdom: Plantae
- Clade: Tracheophytes
- Clade: Angiosperms
- Clade: Eudicots
- Order: Caryophyllales
- Family: Amaranthaceae
- Genus: Celosia
- Species: C. virgata

Binomial name
- Celosia virgata Jacq.

= Celosia virgata =

Species of flowering plant

Celosia virgata, or albahaca, is found in Puerto Rico and the Virgin Islands but not in the continental United States. It is a perennial subshrub.
