= Celosia nitida =

Conservation status
- Secure (NatureServe)

Scientific classification
- Kingdom: Plantae
- Clade: Tracheophytes
- Clade: Angiosperms
- Clade: Eudicots
- Order: Caryophyllales
- Family: Amaranthaceae
- Genus: Celosia
- Species: C. nitida

Binomial name
- Celosia nitida Vahl

Species of flowering plant

Celosia nitida (or Celosia texana) is commonly known as West Indian cock's comb. It is a native perennial in Texas and Florida, though in Florida, it is currently listed as an endangered species. It is also found in Central and South America. The plant can grow up to 2 m (6 feet) in height, and flowers in fall to winter.
