= List of plants of Doi Suthep–Pui National Park =

This article contains a list of the more than 2,200 vascular plant species of Doi Suthep–Pui National Park in Chiang Mai Province, northern Thailand from Maxwell & Elliott (2011:63-154).

== Representative species by floral zone ==
Doi Suthep–Pui National Park displays altitudinal zonation. This section lists some of the characteristic species of each floral zone.

=== Bamboo/deciduous seasonal forest ===
Of the 173 tree species which occur in bamboo/deciduous forest, 125 (72%) are deciduous and 31 are common or abundant.

Trees that are commercially valuable include:

- Tectona grandis (heavily reduced by logging)
- Xylia xylocarpa var. kerrii
- Dalbergia cultrata
- Pterocarpus macrocarpus
- Lagerstroemia cochinchinensis
- Chukrasia tabularis
- Afzelia xylocarpa

Other characteristic trees are:

- Colona flagrocarpa
- Schleichera oleosa
- Terminalia chebula
- Terminalia mucronata
- Sterculia pexa
- Spondias pinnata
- Alstonia scholaris
- Protium serratum
- Adina trichotoma (especially near streams)

Common understory trees include:

- Vitex canescens
- Vitex limonifolia
- Cassia fistula
- Antidesma acidum
- Phyllanthus emblica
- Stereospermum neuranthum

Characteristic deciduous understory treelets include:

- Desmodium laxiflorum
- Desmodium pulchellum

Woody climbers (lianas) are often quite large. There are 55 species, of which 65% are deciduous. They include:

- Millettia cinerea
- Millettia extensa
- Combretum latifolium
- Congea tomentosa

There are 30 shrub species, of which 63% are deciduous. Shrubs are represented by many species in bamboo/deciduous forest. Some typical examples are:

- Helicteres elongata
- Helicteres hirsuta
- Desmodium gangeticum
- Desmodium velutinum
- Sericocalyx quadrifarius
- Phyllanthus sootepensis
- Sauropus hirsutus

Bamboos include:

- Bambusa membranacea
- Bambusa tulda
- Dendrocalamus nudus

Bamboo/deciduous forest supports 38 species of epiphytes, most of which are perennial and 58% of which are evergreen. They mostly belong to 3 groups:

- Moraceae (figs, many of which begin their lives as epiphytes)
- Orchidaceae (orchids)
- Pteridophyta (ferns)

Species particularly characteristic of bamboo/deciduous forest include:

- Ficus heterophylla, an evergreen woody climber
- Ficus microcarpa, an evergreen tree
- Cymbidium aloifolium, a succulent evergreen herb
- Platycerium wallichii
- Drynaria bonii
- Scurrula atropurpurea, an evergreen hemiparasitic epiphyte

Epiliths include 12 species, usually restricted to rocks in streams. They include ferns such as:

- Selaginella kurzii
- Pteris decrescens

There are also several species of the family Gesneriaceae, include:

- Chirita hamosa
- Streptocarpus orientalis

The following herbs flower in April before their leaves appear:

- gingers:
  - Globba nuda
  - Kaempferia rotunda
- orchids:
  - Geodorum siamense
  - Nervilia aragoana
  - Nervilia plicata
- aroids:
  - Amorphophallus macrorhizus

Species appearing in May and June, at the start of the rainy season:

- Curcuma parviflora
- Stemona burkillii
- Geodorum recurvum
- Habenaria thailandica
- Peristylus constrictus

Plants that mature by July and August include ferns, etc. such as:

- Selaginella ostenfeldii
- Anisocampium cumingianum
- Kuniwatsukia cuspidata
- Dryopteris cochleata (has bimorphic fronds; a characteristic fern)

The grass most characteristic of the ground flora in bamboo/deciduous forest is:

- Oryza meyeriana var. granulata

Other common grasses, which also occur in other habitats and are highly combustible during the hot dry season, are:

- Microstegium vagans
- Panicum notatum

A total of 316 herb species has been recorded in bamboo/deciduous forest, of which 294 are ground herbs. Of those, 65% are perennial.

=== Deciduous dipterocarp-oak seasonal forest ===
In seasonally dry or degraded areas, from the lowlands up to about 800-900 m elevation, deciduous dipterocarp-oak forest replaces bamboo/deciduous forest. It is a secondary, fire climax forest which merges with bamboo/deciduous forest, but is never replaced with mixed evergreen/deciduous forest.

It contains less biodiversity with only 99 tree species, of which 24 are common or abundant.

Dominant tree species of the Dipterocarpaceae include:

- Dipterocarpus tuberculatus (especially common along ridge crests)
- Dipterocarpus obtusifolius (more common on gentle slopes or in slightly moister areas)
- Shorea obtusa
- Shorea siamensis

Common Fagaceae species include:

- Quercus kerrii
- Quercus aliena
- Quercus brandisiana
- Castanopsis argyrophylla (one of the very few evergreen tree species in deciduous dipterocarp-oak forest)

Other characteristic trees are:

- Phoenix loureiroi (a small, fire resistant palm)
- Ochna integerrima

Additional common species:

- Buchanania glabra
- Buchanania lanzan
- Craibiodendron stellatum
- Eugenia cumini
- Dalbergia cultrata
- Gluta usitata
- Symplocos racemosa
- Strychnos nux-vomica

2 tree species have rapid leaf turnover, flushing new leaves at the same time as the old leaves are shed. They include:

- Tristaniopsis burmanica var. rufescens
- Anneslea fragrans

The following tree is very common at higher elevations (650-800 m), along with the two trees listed above:

- Aporosa villosa

Deciduous dipterocarp-oak forest supports only 14 species of woody climbers, but the deciduous species that are easily found are:

- Spatholobus parviflorus
- Aganosma marginata
- Celastrus paniculatus

Shrubs (29 species) and treelets (48 species) are abundant. Some common examples are:

- Helicteres isora
- Grewia abutilifolia
- Grewia lacei
- Desmodium motorium
- Desmodium triangulare
- Indigofera cassioides
- Gardenia obtusifolia
- Pavetta fruticosa
- Strobilanthes apricus var. pedunculatus
- Premna herbacea
- Premna nana
- Breynia fruticosa
- Breynia glauca
- Sauropus bicolor
- Sauropus quadrangularis
- Pueraria wallichii (a deciduous shrub; often scandent)
- Mussaenda parva (a deciduous vine, woody climber, or scandent shrub)

Vines, often found in open, often burned, areas, are also common:

- Dunbaria bella
- Solena amplexicaulis
- Streptocaulon juventas
- Argyreia henryi

47 of the recorded vascular plant species live as epiphytes. Some of the most characteristic are evergreen, succulent, vines and creepers in the Asclepiadaceae, such as:

- Dischidia major (has two kinds of leaves, i.e. normal and bladder-like ones which have a symbiotic relationship with ants)
- Dischidia nummularia
- Hoya kerrii (less common than Hoya verticillata)

There are numerous succulent, evergreen and deciduous Orchidaceae (orchids), such as:

- Cleisomeria lanatum
- Cleisostoma arietinum
- Cymbidium ensifolium
- Dendrobium lindleyi
- Dendrobium porphyrophyllum
- Dendrobium secundum
- Eria acervata
- Eria pannea
- Rhynchogyna saccata
- Vanda brunnea

2 deciduous Polypodiaceae (fern) species, both with characteristically distinct growth forms, are also frequently seen:

- Drynaria rigidula
- Platycerium wallichii

Of the 274 ground herbs which have been recorded, 111 (40%) are annuals. Some of the more common examples are:

- Polygala longifolia
- Biophytum umbraculum
- Crotalaria alata
- Crotalaria albida
- Crotalaria neriifolia
- Indigofera hirsuta
- Uraria lacei
- Blumea lacera
- Gynura integrifolia
- Pluchea polygonata

Robust, deciduous Poaceae (grasses) dominate and are all very combustible during the hot dry season from March to May. Some of the more common species are:

- Apluda mutica
- Aristida cumingiana
- Arundinella setosa
- Capillipedium assimile
- Eulalia siamensis
- Heteropogon contortus
- Polytoca digitata
- Schizachyrium sanguineum

Cyperaceae (sedges) are also common in this fire-prone habitat. Typical species include:

- Bulbostylis barbata
- Carex continua
- Cyperus cuspidatus
- Fimbristylis straminea
- Rhynchospora rubra
- Scleria kerrii
- Scleria levis

Zingiberaceae (gingers) species, all of which are deciduous, are quite common. Typical species include:

- Curcuma ecomata
- Curcuma parviflora
- Curcuma zedoaria
- Globba nuda
- Globba villosula
- Kaempferia rotunda

Other common ground herbs include:

- Barleria cristata
- Geniosporum coloratum
- Striga masuria (parasitic on the roots of other plants)
- Aeginetia indica (parasitic on the roots of other plants)

Common ferns:

- Adiantum philippense
- Adiantum zollingeri
- Cheilanthes tenuifolia
- Selaginella ostenfeldii (a common, deciduous, ground fern ally)

=== Mixed evergreen/deciduous seasonal forest ===
From about 800 m elevation (600 m near permanent streams) to about 1000 m, there is a mixture of deciduous and evergreen trees.

217 tree species have been recorded, with only about 43% of them being deciduous trees. The tree flora is similar to that of the bamboo/deciduous forest.

The characteristic tall, emergent, evergreen, dipterocarps, which have large gray trunks, small leaves, and open, broad crowns, are:

- Dipterocarpus costatus
- Dipterocarpus turbinatus

In contrast, the deciduous dipterocarp-oak forest has large-leaved dipterocarps.

Other common tree species:

- Mangifera caloneura
- Eugenia albiflora
- Balakata baccata (shared with evergreen forest)

Other tall evergreen trees:

- Duabanga grandiflora
- Irvingia malayana

Some common deciduous canopy trees are:

- Lagerstroemia cochinchinensis var. ovalifolia
- Lagerstroemia tomentosa
- Spondias pinnata
- Terminalia mucronata
- Engelhardia serrata

Common evergreen understory trees include:

- Garcinia speciosa
- Lithocarpus elegans
- Scleropyrum wallichianum var. siamensis
- Turpinia pomifera
- Knema laurina
- Cinnamomum iners
- Baccaurea ramiflora

A common deciduous understory tree:

- Bauhinia variegata

71 treelet and 19 shrub species have been recorded. Common treelets and shrubs include:

- Millettia caerulea (deciduous)
- Ixora cibdela var. puberula (evergreen)
- Psychotria ophioxyloides (evergreen)

Woody climbers are common. 62 species have been recorded, including the following deciduous species:

- Combretum trifoliatum
- Combretum latifolium
- Ventilago denticulata

Evergreen species that are common in this biozone, especially along streams, include:

- Combretum sundaicum
- Rhamnus nepalensis
- Tetrastigma laoticum

57 of the vascular plant species grow as epiphytes. The most specious groups are the figs (Moraceae, many of which are epiphytes only when young), orchids, and pteridophytes, but the Gesneriaceae and Loranthaceae are also represented.

Characteristic epiphytes are:

- Bulbophyllum congestum
- Bulbophyllum propinquum

Typical hemiparasites include:

- Helixanthera pulchra
- Dendrophthoe pentandra

The ground flora is diverse and includes both annual, perennial, deciduous and evergreen species. Of the 278 ground herbs recorded, 25% are annual. Common deciduous herbs include:

- Strobilanthes anfractuosus
- Ruellia siamensis
- Begonia integrifolia
- Zingiber kerrii
- Globba villosula

Evergreen herb species are more common (comprising 60% of ground perennials) and include:

- Tacca chantrieri
- Amomum uliginosum

Typical ferns include:

- Thelypteris arida
- Cibotium barometz

=== Primary evergreen seasonal forest (without pine) ===
The upper part of the mixed evergreen/deciduous forest usually merges with the lower part of the evergreen forest at c. 900-950 m elevation.

Evergreen forest supports more tree species than any of the other forest types. 250 species have been recorded, of which only 67 (27%) are deciduous.

The evergreen forest has a wide variety of trees, with no dominant species or genera. Trees belong to diverse families, such as Lauraceae, Fagaceae, Theaceae, Moraceae, Magnoliaceae, and other families.

Characteristic evergreen canopy trees include:

- Alseodaphne andersonii
- Beilschmiedia aff. intermedia
- Cryptocarya amygdalina
- Artocarpus lanceolata

Several gigantic "strangling" figs:

- Ficus altissima
- Ficus benjamina

Characteristic Fagaceae species are:

- Quercus augustinei, syn. Quercus glabricupula
- Quercus vestita
- Quercus incana
- Quercus lineata

Castanopsis spp. tend to be shared with other forest types, including:

- Castanopsis acuminatissima
- Castanopsis armata

Other characteristic evergreen trees include:

- Pyrenaria garrettiana
- Garcinia mckeaniana
- Casearia grewiifolia var. gelonioides
- Chionanthus sutepensis
- Elaeocarpus prunifolius
- Dysoxylum aff. hamiltonii
- Ostodes paniculata
- Diospyros malabarica

A few of the larger deciduous canopy species include:

- Michelia champaca
- Michelia baillonii
- Homalium ceylanicum
- Melia toosendan
- Morus macroura

Most also occur in the deciduous forest types.

Some of the deciduous trees which are restricted to evergreen forest are relatively rare, including:

- Hovenia dulcis
- Acrocarpus fraxinifolius
- Litsea zeylanica

Other deciduous trees more typical of deciduous forest types sometimes spread up into evergreen forest due to fires or human disturbance. Common tree species shared with other forest types include:

- Balakata baccata
- Schima wallichii
- Gluta obovata
- Duabanga grandiflora
- Mischocarpus pentapetalus

The understory is denser than that of forests at lower elevations and is especially diverse in stream valleys. Understory trees include:

- Phoebe lanceolata
- Acronychia pedunculata
- Sarcosperma arboreum
- Diospyros glandulosa

The following are also common, but grow in disturbed places.

- Styrax benzoides
- Maesa ramentacea

Some understory evergreen tree species, rarely exceeding 15 m tall, include:

- Elaeocarpus prunifolius
- Semecarpus cochinchinensis
- Turpinia pomifera
- Eugenia fruticosa
- Actinodaphne henryi
- Helicia nilagirica

Understory deciduous tree species include:

- Spondias axillaris
- Engelhardia spicata

Treelets and shrubs (91 and 22 recorded species, respectively) are numerous. Characteristic treelets include:

- Vernonia volkameriifolia
- Glochidion kerrii
- Debregeasia longifolia
- Archidendron glomeriflorum
- Areca laosensis
- Litsea salicifolia
- Litsea cubeba

Characteristic evergreen shrubs in moist areas include:

- Psychotria ophioxyloides
- Phlogacanthus curviflorus

Shaded, undisturbed stream valleys often have:

- Pandanus penetrans
- Musa itinerans

The following species are also common:

- Clerodendrum serratum var. wallichii
- Ardisia virens
- Euodia triphylla

A high species richness of woody climbers (78 species) is a notable feature of evergreen forest. Some characteristic evergreen examples include:

- Toddalia asiatica
- Ficus parietalis
- Bauhinia glauca ssp. tenuiflora
- Combretum punctatum ssp. squamosum
- Uncaria macrophylla

The following are also common:

- Tetrastigma laoticum
- Tetrastigma obovatum
- Mucuna macrocarpa (also in mixed evergreen/deciduous forest)

Rattans (the following of which are also evergreen woody climbers) include:

- Calamus kerrianus (range from c. 700-1525 m, primarily in mixed and evergreen forests; an evergreen woody climber)
- Plectocomia kerriana (known only from the upper Chang Khian valley at 1350-1400 m; an evergreen woody climber)
- Calamus arborescens (known only from the middle Chang Khian Valley at 1050 m; a treelet or shrub)

There are numerous epiphytes in the evergreen forest. The "strangling" figs begin life as epiphytes:

- Ficus superba
- Sorbus verrucosa (very rare)

Characteristic epiphytic shrubs include:

- Rhododendron veitchianum

There are several evergreen hemiparasitic species belonging to the family Loranthaceae:

- Macrosolen cochinchinensis
- Viscum ovalifolium
- Viscum orientale
- Fagraea ceilanica (very rare)

Characteristic epiphytic vines include:

- Rhaphidophora glauca (uncommon species)
- Hoya siamica

Epiphytic herbs are almost all perennials. Characteristic species include:

- Hedychium ellipticum
- orchids
  - Bulbophyllum bittnerianum
  - Coelogyne schultesii
  - Trichotosia dasyphylla
- ferns
  - Lepisorus nudus
  - Davallodes membranulosum
- Gesneriaceae
  - Didymocarpus wattianus
  - Aeschynanthus hosseusii

The herbaceous ground flora (321 recorded species) is very diverse and includes numerous species of dicots, monocots, and ferns. Some of the most characteristic ferns in open, fire-damaged place are:

- Brainea insignis
- Dicranopteris linearis

Some characteristic ferns in shaded, mostly pristine areas are:

- Arachniodes henryi
- Tectaria herpetocaulos
- Thelypteris subelata
- Diplazium dilatatum

Some common dicots are:

- Impatiens violaeflora
- Hydrocotyle siamica
- Ophiorrhiza hispidula
- Geophila repens
- Wedelia montana var. wallichii
- Pilea trinervia

Common herbaceous monocots are:

- Aneilema sinicum
- Commelina diffusa
- Murdannia gigantea
- Globba kerrii
- Globba villosula
- Zingiber smilesianum
- Acorus gramineus, an epilithic rheophyte
- Amorphophallus corrugatus
- Vanilla siamensis (very rare)
- Carex baccans

Parasitic or saprophytic members of the ground flora include several Balanophora species and others:

- Balanophora abbreviata
- Balanophora fungosa ssp. indica
- Aeginetia indica
- Sapria himalayana

Rare orchids include:

- Epipogium roseum
- Stereosandra javanica

=== Primary evergreen seasonal forest (with pine) ===
On fire-prone, exposed ridges at elevations of about 950–1,800 m, Pinus kesiya grows together with other evergreen forest tree species. In some areas, it is the dominant tree.

Some species more commonly found with Pinus kesiya than elsewhere, mostly due to the acidic lower pH of the soil, include:

- Viburnum inopinatum
- Helicia nilagirica
- Myrica esculenta
- Castanopsis argyrophylla
- Quercus brandisiana (deciduous)
- Quercus lenticellata

Where fires are particularly frequent, plants of deciduous dipterocarp-oak forest spread up into the pine forests at much higher elevations than is typical, including:

- Craibiodendron stellatum
- Vaccinium sprengelii
- Anneslea fragrans
- Aporosa villosa

In such areas, trees of the Fagaceae family are also common, including:

- Castanopsis armata
- Castanopsis tribuloides
- Lithocarpus elegans
- Lithocarpus fenestratus
- Quercus vestita

Altogether 99 tree species have been recorded, of which only 27 (27%) are deciduous.

The ground flora includes 263 recorded herb species, both annuals (32%) and perennials (68%). Annual herbs include:

- Blumeopsis flava
- Anaphalis margaritacea
- Lobelia nicotianifolia
- Exacum pteranthum

Some deciduous, perennial counterparts are:

- Inula cappa
- Pratia begonifolia, a creeper
- Anthogonium gracile
- Oleandra undulata
- Kuniwatsukia cuspidata

Epiphytes (86 recorded species) are especially conspicuous and include both evergreen species (68%) and annual or deciduous ones (32%). Epiphytic, hemi-parasitic Loranthaceae, all evergreen shrubs, are common:

- Dendrophthoe pentandra
- Helixanthera parasitica
- Macrosolen avenis
- Scurrula ferruginea
- Viscum ovalifolium

Autotrophic evergreen, epiphytic and epilithic shrubs are frequently encountered:

- Agapetes hosseana
- Aeschynanthus hildebrandii
- Aeschynanthus hosseusii

Some common evergreen epiphytic and epilithic herbs are:

- Vittaria flexuosa
- Elaphoglossum yoshinagae
- Lepisorus bicolor
- Pyrrosia stigmosa

Some common deciduous epiphytic and epilithic herbs are:

- Didymocarpus aureoglandulosus
- Didymocarpus kerrii
- Araiostegia pulchra
- Crypsinus cruciformis
- Crypsinus oxylobus
- Drynaria propinqua
- Microsorum membranaceum

Evergreen epiphytic Orchidaceae species include:

- Cleisostoma fuerstenbergianum
- Coelogyne trinervis
- Dendrobium christyanum
- Dendrobium cariniferum
- Pholidota articulata
- Trichotosia dasyphylla

Deciduous epiphytic Orchidaceae species include:

- Bulbophyllum secundum
- Bulbophyllum suavissimum
- Dendrobium falconeri
- Dendrobium heterocarpum
- Diploprora championii
- Oberonia pachyphylla
- Zeuxine affinis (a delicate, deciduous, saprophytic ground herb still commonly found in evergreen/pine areas)

Rare or extinct orchid species include:

- Phaius tankervilleae (a particularly showy, evergreen ground orchid, perhaps extirpated from the park)
- Tainia viridifusca (deciduous, with highly conspicuous inflorescences; extremely rare)

35 vine species have been recorded, including:

- Codonopsis javanica (evergreen)
- Clitoria mariana (deciduous)
- Shuteria involucrata (deciduous)

=== Summit flora ===
The summit flora has been significantly altered, especially after the original primary evergreen forest was cleared and replaced with cultivated trees on the summit of Doi Pui in 1955. The soil has also become much more acidic.

Some of the original epiphytic flora has returned to the summit of Doi Pui, such as:

- Agapetes hosseana
- Aeschynanthus lineatus
- Cheirostylis griffithii
- Trichotosia dasyphylla
- Crypsinus cruciformis
- Crypsinus oxylobus
- Lepisorus heterolepis
- Microsorum membranaceum
- Polypodium amoenum

Some evergreen herbs which have returned, albeit in diminished populations, include:

- Hydrocotyle siamica
- Strobilanthes anfractuosus
- Strobilanthes consors
- Aspidistra sutepensis

Deciduous herbs are more common, including:

- Elsholtzia winitiana
- Globba clarkei
- Hypoxis aurea
- Arisaema erubescens
- Asparagus filicinus
- Paris polyphylla
- Crepidium acuminatum
- Crepidium orbiculare
- Habenaria stenopetala

9 plant species, all of which are rare or down to a few individuals, are entirely restricted to summit areas between 1620 and 1685 m above sea level. They are:

- Poa annua
- Hedychium villosum
- Thalictrum foliolosum
- Aeschynanthus lineatus
- Strobilanthes consors
- Alpinia blepharocalyx
- Cleisostoma rolfeanum
- Cymbidium tracyanum
- Dendrobium sutepense

However, several species have disappeared from the summit:

- Camellia connata
- Paramignya surasiana
- Euonymus colonoides
- Hoya engleriana
- Dendrobium sutepense

Mountains in Thailand that more or less preserve the original vegetation at above 1650 m are Doi Inthanon (2565 m), Doi Chang (1975 m), and Doi Lang Ka (2031 m).

=== Disturbed areas and secondary growth ===
A total of 288 species of ground herbs survives in disturbed areas or secondary growth. 144 species are annuals, and 144 species are perennials. There are numerous annual tertiary growth herbaceous weeds, all of which require exposure to sunlight for germination and growth. Some of the more common species found at all elevations include:

- Urena lobata
- Triumfetta rhomboidea
- Mimosa pudica var. hispida
- Passiflora foetida
- Borreria laevis
- Hedyotis corymbosa
- Mitracarpus villosus
- Ageratum conyzoides
- Bidens pilosa
- Conyza sumatrensis
- Crassocephalum crepidioides
- Eupatorium odoratum
- Spilanthes paniculata
- Synedrella nodiflora
- Vernonia cinerea
- Physalis angulata
- Scoparia dulcis
- Justicia procumbens
- Euphorbia heterophylla
- Euphorbia hirta
- Phyllanthus amarus
- Phyllanthus urinaria

Monocot weeds are also diverse and abundant. Some common examples are:

- Commelina diffusa
- Cyperus cyperoides
- Cyperus kyllingia
- Fimbristylis dichotoma
- Arundinella setosa
- Cyrtococcum accrescens
- Cyrtococcum oxyphyllum
- Digitaria setigera
- Eragrostis nigra
- Paspalum conjugatum
- Sacciolepis indica
- Setaria palmifolia
- Setaria parviflora
- Sporobolus diandrus

Robust perennial grasses are especially common in upland areas. They are robust, evergreen, and very persistent weeds in open, fire-damaged, upland areas, and include:

- Apluda mutica
- Imperata cylindrica var. major
- Pennisetum pedicellatum
- Phragmites vallatoria
- Themeda triandra
- Thysanolaena latifolia
- Eupatorium adenophorum
- Pteridium aquilinum

Naturalized woody weeds that often dominate open, disturbed areas are:

- Mimosa pigra
- Solanum verbascifolium
- Lantana camara

Secondary growth treelets (36 species) and trees (81 species) are common seen. If left undisturbed, they are replaced by primary forest trees. Some typical examples are:

- Albizia chinensis
- Leucaena leucocephala (both introduced and cultivated, and often becomes locally naturalized)
- Rhus chinensis
- Callicarpa arborea
- Glochidion sphaerogynum
- Macaranga denticulata
- Mallotus paniculatus
- Mallotus philippensis
- Ficus fistulosa
- Ficus hispida
- Trema orientalis

=== In human settlements ===
Common shade trees include:

- Samanea saman
- Ficus religiosa
- Ceiba pentandra

Some flowers and shrubs are:

- Hibiscus rosa-sinensis
- Bougainvillea spectabilis
- Oroxylum indicum (has flowers and young fruits which are edible)
- Eryngium foetidum
- Canna hybrid spp.

Medicinal plants:

- Jatropha curcas
- Ricinus communis (castor)

Exotic ornamental plants:

- Bauhinia purpurea
- Delonix regia
- Senna spectabilis
- Lagerstroemia speciosa
- Jacaranda obtusifolia ssp. rhombifolia

Plants species with large, colourful inflorescences, which have now escaped cultivation and are extirpating native species:

- Tithonia diversifolia
- Euphorbia pulcherrima

== Plants used by local people ==
In the Hmong village of Doi Pui, located within the park boundaries, plant species utilized by the local people include the following.

- wild fruits: Phyllanthus emblica, Protium serratum
- local vegetation: Diplazium, Lasia spinosa
- orchards: Dendrocalamus hamiltonii, Diplazium esculentum
- general healing: Betula alnoides, Cryptolepis dubia, Globba nisbetiana, Neuropeltis racemosa
- fever relief: Thunbergia laurifolia, Tithonia diversfolia
- healing and body anti-infective: Adiantum erylliae, Chromolaena odorata, Ricinus communis
- buffer zone between forest and agricultural areas: Sterculia macrophylla, Sterculia urens, Sterculia villosa
- dyes: Tephrosia purpurea, Artocarpus chama, Artocarpus lacucha
- burial ceremonies: Ixora sp., Rothmannia sootepensis
- communication with ancestral spirits: Pavetta indica
- placed on ears of sick people: Bombax anceps
- coffin wood: Magnolia baillonii, Magnolia garrettii
- hunting dart poison: resin of Antiaris toxicaria
- fish poison: Mucuna macrocarpa
- irritants for humans: Mallotus barbatus, Dendrocnide sp.
- construction, low strength: Castanopsis diversifolia, Castanopsis acuminatissima, Schima wallichii
- construction, preferred: Protium serratum, Canarium euphyllum, Canarium subulatum
- agricultural tools: Memecylon plebejum, Tristaniopsis burmanica
- charcoal production: Gluta glabra, Semecarpus cochinchinensis
- bamboos: Dendrocalamus hamiltonii, Thyrsostachys siamensis, Bambusa sp.
- animal feed: Cyperus iria, Brachiaria distachya

== List of species by family ==
=== Angiospermae, Dicotyledoneae ===
==== Ranunculaceae ====
- Clematis buchananiana
- Clematis eichleri
- Clematis sikkimensis
- Clematis smilacifolia
- Clematis subumbellata
- Delphinium siamense
- Naravelia siamensis
- Thalictrum foliolosum

==== Dilleniaceae ====
- Dillenia aurea
- Dillenia parviflora
- Dillenia pentagyna

==== Magnoliaceae ====
- Magnolia liliifera
- Manglietia garrettii
- Michelia baillonii
- Michelia champaca
- Michelia floribunda

==== Schisandraceae ====
- Kadsura heteroclita

==== Annonaceae ====
- Anomianthus dulcis
- Artabotrys sp.
- Desmos dumosus
- Desmos sootepense
- Ellipelopsis cherrevensis
- Fissistigma oblongum
- Fissistigma sp.
- Goniothalamus griffithii
- Miliusa cuneata
- Miliusa thorelii
- Miliusa velutina
- Mitrephora vandaeflora
- Polyalthia debilis
- Polyalthia littoralis
- Polyalthia simiarum
- Polyalthia sp.
- Uvaria rufa

==== Menispermaceae ====
- Cissampelos hispida
- Cissampelos pareira
- Cocculus laurifolius
- Cyclea atjehensis
- Cyclea barbata
- Cyclea polypetala
- Cyclea varians
- Diploclisia glaucescens
- Pachygone dasycarpa
- Parabaena sagittata
- Pericampylus glaucus
- Stephania brevipes
- Stephania elegans
- Stephania glabra
- Stephania japonica
- Stephania oblata
- Tiliacora triandra
- Tinomiscium petiolare
- Tinospora crispa
- Tinospora sinensis

==== Berberidaceae ====
- Mahonia nepalensis

==== Lardizabalaceae ====
- Parvatia brunoniana

==== Papaveraceae ====
- Papaver somniferum

==== Cruciferae ====
- Brassica juncea
- Rorippa dubia

==== Capparaceae ====
- Capparis disticha
- Capparis kerrii
- Capparis pyrifolia
- Capparis sepiaria
- Cleome rutidosperma
- Cleome viscosa
- Crateva magna
- Crateva religiosa

==== Violaceae ====
- Scyphellandra pierrei
- Viola pilosa

==== Pittosporaceae ====
- Pittosporum napaulense

==== Polygalaceae ====
- Polygala chinensis
- Polygala longifolia
- Polygala persicariaefolia
- Polygala tricholopha
- Polygala triflora
- Polygala umbonata
- Salomonia cantoniensis
- Salomonia longiciliata
- Securidaca inappendiculata
- Xanthophyllum flavescens
- Xanthophyllum virens

==== Caryophyllaceae ====
- Drymaria diandra
- Myosoton aquaticum
- Stellaria monosperma

==== Portulacaceae ====
- Portulaca oleracea

==== Guttiferae ====
- Calophyllum polyanthum
- Cratoxylum cochinchinense
- Cratoxylum formosum
- Cratoxylum maingayi
- Garcinia cowa
- Garcinia mckeaniana
- Garcinia merguensis
- Garcinia speciosa
- Garcinia thorelii
- Garcinia xanthochymus
- Hypericum japonicum
- Mammea siamensis
- Mesua ferrea

==== Flacourtiaceae ====
- Casearia flexuosa
- Casearia graveolens
- Casearia grewiifolia
- Flacourtia indica
- Homalium ceylanicum
- Xylosma brachystachys

==== Theaceae ====
- Adinandra integerrima
- Anneslea fragrans
- Camellia oleifera
- Camellia sinensis
- Eurya acuminata
- Eurya nitida
- Gordonia dalglieshiana
- Pyrenaria camelliiflora
- Pyrenaria garrettiana
- Schima wallichii
- Ternstroemia gymnanthera

==== Actinidiaceae ====
- Actinidia rubricaulis

==== Saururaceae ====
- Houttuynia cordata
- Saurauia napaulensis
- Saurauia roxburghii

==== Dipterocarpaceae ====
- Dipterocarpus costatus
- Dipterocarpus obtusifolius
- Dipterocarpus tuberculatus
- Dipterocarpus turbinatus
- Hopea odorata
- Shorea farinosa
- Shorea obtusa
- Shorea roxburghii
- Shorea siamensis

==== Malvaceae ====
- Abelmoschus moschatus
- Hibiscus furcatus
- Hibiscus glanduliferus
- Hibiscus mutabilis
- Hibiscus surattensis
- Kydia calycina
- Pavonia repanda
- Sida mysorensis
- Sida rhombifolia
- Thespesia lampas
- Urena lobata

==== Bombacaceae ====
- Bombax anceps
- Bombax ceiba

==== Sterculiaceae ====
- Byttneria aspera
- Byttneria pilosa
- Eriolaena candollei
- Firmiana colorata
- Helicteres angustifolia
- Helicteres elongata
- Helicteres hirsuta
- Helicteres isora
- Helicteres lanceolata
- Melochia corchorifolia
- Pterocymbium tinctorium
- Pterospermum acerifolium
- Pterospermum grandiflorum
- Pterospermum semisagittatum
- Reevesia pubescens
- Sterculia balanghas
- Sterculia lanceolata
- Sterculia pexa
- Sterculia urens
- Sterculia villosa

==== Tiliaceae ====
- Berrya mollis
- Colona flagrocarpa
- Colona floribunda
- Corchorus aestuans
- Grewia abutilifolia
- Grewia acuminata
- Grewia eriocarpa
- Grewia hirsuta
- Grewia lacei
- Grewia laevigata
- Grewia polygama
- Microcos paniculata
- Muntingia calabura
- Schoutenia glomerata
- Triumfetta pilosa
- Triumfetta rhomboidea

==== Elaeocarpaceae ====
- Elaeocarpus braceanus
- Elaeocarpus floribundus
- Elaeocarpus lanceifolius
- Elaeocarpus petiolatus
- Elaeocarpus prunifolius
- Elaeocarpus sphaericus
- Elaeocarpus stipularis
- Sloanea tomentosa

==== Linaceae ====
- Reinwardtia indica

==== Erythroxylaceae ====
- Erythroxylum cuneatum

==== Malpighiaceae ====
- Aspidopterys nutans
- Aspidopterys tomentosa
- Hiptage benghalensis

==== Oxalidaceae ====
- Biophytum reinwardtii
- Biophytum sensitivum
- Biophytum umbraculum
- Oxalis corniculata
- Oxalis corymbosa

==== Balsaminaceae ====
- Impatiens curvipes
- Impatiens garrettii
- Impatiens mengtszeana
- Impatiens violaeflora

==== Rutaceae ====
- Acronychia pedunculata
- Aegle marmelos
- Clausena excavata
- Clausena lenis
- Euodia glomerata
- Euodia meliifolia
- Euodia triphylla
- Euodia viticina
- Feronia limonia
- Glycosmis puberula
- Luvunga scandens
- Micromelum falcatum
- Micromelum hirsutum
- Micromelum minutum
- Paramignya scandens
- Toddalia asiatica
- Zanthoxylum acanthopodium

==== Simaroubaceae ====
- Brucea javanica
- Brucea mollis
- Eurycoma longifolia
- Harrisonia perforata
- Picrasma javanica

==== Irvingiaceae ====
- Irvingia malayana

==== Ochnaceae ====
- Ochna integerrima

==== Burseraceae ====
- Canarium subulatum
- Garuga pinnata
- Protium serratum

==== Meliaceae ====
- Aglaia lawii
- Aphanamixis polystachya
- Aphanamixis sp.
- Chukrasia tabularis
- Cipadessa baccifera
- Dysoxylum aff. cauliflorum
- Dysoxylum excelsum
- Dysoxylum aff. hamiltonii
- Heynea trijuga
- Melia toosendan
- Munronia humilis
- Sandoricum koetjape
- Toona ciliata
- Walsura intermedia
- Walsura trichostemon

==== Olacaceae ====
- Anacolosa ilicoides
- Olax imbricata
- Olax scandens
- Schoepfia fragrans

==== Icacinaceae ====
- Apodytes dimidiata
- Iodes vitiginea
- Pittosporopsis kerrii
- Platea latifolia

==== Cardiopteridaceae ====
- Cardiopteris quinqueloba

==== Aquifoliaceae ====
- Ilex englishii
- Ilex umbellulata
- Ilex sp.

==== Celastraceae ====
- Celastrus monospermus
- Celastrus paniculatus
- Euonymus similis
- Euonymus sootepensis
- Lophopetalum wallichii
- Reissantia indica
- Siphonodon celastrineus

==== Rhamnaceae ====
- Berchemia floribunda
- Colubrina pubescens
- Hovenia dulcis
- Rhamnus nepalensis
- Ventilago denticulata
- Ziziphus oenoplia
- Ziziphus rugosa

==== Vitaceae ====
- Ampelocissus martinii
- Ampelocissus sp.
- Cayratia japonica
- Cayratia pedata
- Cayratia trifolia
- Cayratia sp.
- Cissus adnata
- Cissus assamica
- Cissus discolor
- Cissus hastata
- Cissus repanda
- Cissus repens
- Parthenocissus semicordata
- Tetrastigma campylocarpum
- Tetrastigma crassipes
- Tetrastigma cruciatum
- Tetrastigma delavayi
- Tetrastigma garrettii
- Tetrastigma aff. harmandii
- Tetrastigma laoticum
- Tetrastigma obovatum
- Tetrastigma quadrangulum
- Tetrastigma serrulatum
- Tetrastigma siamense
- Tetrastigma yunnanense
- Tetrastigma sp.

==== Leeaceae ====
- Leea guineensis
- Leea herbacea
- Leea indica
- Leea macrophylla
- Leea rubra

==== Sapindaceae ====
- Allophylus cobbe
- Dimocarpus longan
- Harpullia cupanioides
- Lepisanthes tetraphylla
- Litchi chinensis
- Mischocarpus pentapetalus
- Sapindus rarak
- Schleichera oleosa

==== Aceraceae ====
- Acer laurinum

==== Staphyleaceae ====
- Turpinia nepalensis
- Turpinia pomifera

==== Sabiaceae ====
- Meliosma pinnata
- Meliosma simplicifolia

==== Anacardiaceae ====
- Buchanania glabra
- Buchanania lanzan
- Gluta obovata
- Gluta usitata
- Holigarna kurzii
- Lannea coromandelica
- Mangifera caloneura
- Pegia nitida
- Rhus chinensis
- Rhus rhetsoides
- Rhus succedanea
- Semecarpus cochinchinensis
- Spondias axillaris
- Spondias pinnata

==== Connaraceae ====
- Cnestis palala
- Connarus semidecandrus
- Rourea minor

==== Fabaceae ====
===== Mimosoideae =====
- Acacia concinna
- Acacia megaladena
- Adenanthera microsperma
- Albizia chinensis
- Albizia crassiramea
- Albizia garrettii
- Albizia lebbeck
- Albizia lucidior
- Albizia odoratissima
- Archidendron clypearia
- Archidendron glomeriflorum
- Entada rheedei
- Mimosa diplotricha
- Mimosa pigra
- Mimosa pudica
- Samanea saman
- Xylia xylocarpa

===== Caesalpinioideae =====
- Acrocarpus fraxinifolius
- Afzelia xylocarpa
- Bauhinia bracteata
- Bauhinia glauca
- Bauhinia hirsuta
- Bauhinia ornata
- Bauhinia purpurea
- Bauhinia racemosa
- Bauhinia variegata
- Bauhinia viridescens
- Caesalpinia cucullata
- Caesalpinia digyna
- Caesalpinia furfuracea
- Caesalpinia hymenocarpa
- Caesalpinia mimosoides
- Caesalpinia sappan
- Cassia bakeriana
- Cassia fistula
- Chamaecrista leschenaultiana
- Peltophorum dasyrrhachis
- Pterolobium macropterum
- Senna spectabilis
- Senna tora
- Sindora siamensis

===== Papilionoideae =====
- Abrus precatorius
- Abrus pulchellus
- Aeschynomene americana
- Afgekia filipes
- Alysicarpus bupleurifolius
- Apios carnea
- Butea monosperma
- Cajanus cajan
- Cajanus crassus
- Cajanus goensis
- Cajanus scarabaeoides
- Cajanus volubilis
- Callerya atropurpurea
- Canavalia ensiformis
- Centrosema pubescens
- Christia obcordata
- Clitoria macrophylla
- Clitoria mariana
- Crotalaria acicularis
- Crotalaria alata
- Crotalaria albida
- Crotalaria assamica
- Crotalaria bracteata
- Crotalaria dubia
- Crotalaria ferruginea
- Crotalaria kurzii
- Crotalaria medicaginea
- Crotalaria neriifolia
- Crotalaria pallida
- Crotalaria prostrata
- Crotalaria sessiliflora
- Crotalaria shanica
- Crotalaria zanzibarica
- Cruddasia insignis
- Cyclocarpa stellaris
- Cylista scariosa
- Dalbergia cana
- Dalbergia cultrata
- Dalbergia lacei
- Dalbergia lanceolaria
- Dalbergia oliveri
- Dalbergia ovata
- Dalbergia rimosa
- Dalbergia stipulacea
- Dalbergia velutina
- Dalbergia volubilis
- Derris robusta
- Desmodium elegans
- Desmodium flexuosum
- Desmodium gangeticum
- Desmodium gyroides
- Desmodium heterocarpon
- Desmodium laxiflorum
- Desmodium longipes
- Desmodium megaphyllum
- Desmodium motorium
- Desmodium multiflorum
- Desmodium oblatum
- Desmodium oblongum
- Desmodium pulchellum
- Desmodium renifolium
- Desmodium repandum
- Desmodium triangulare
- Desmodium triflorum
- Desmodium triquetrum
- Desmodium velutinum
- Diphyllarium mekongense
- Dolichos tenuicaulis
- Dumasia leiocarpa
- Dunbaria bella
- Dunbaria fusca
- Dunbaria podocarpa
- Dunbaria villosa
- Dysolobium dolichoides
- Dysolobium grande
- Dysolobium pilosum
- Endosamara racemosa
- Eriosema chinense
- Erythrina stricta
- Erythrina suberosa
- Erythrina subumbrans
- Flemingia lineata
- Flemingia paniculata
- Flemingia sootepensis
- Flemingia strobilifera
- Grona grahamii
- Indigofera cassioides
- Indigofera dosua
- Indigofera hirsuta
- Indigofera laxiflora
- Indigofera linnaei
- Indigofera squalida
- Lablab purpureus
- Lespedeza parviflora
- Lespedeza pinetorum
- Macroptilium atropurpureum
- Macrotyloma uniflorum
- Millettia brandisiana
- Millettia caerulea
- Millettia extensa
- Millettia aff. glaucescens
- Millettia latifolia
- Millettia macrostachya
- Millettia pachycarpa
- Millettia xylocarpa
- Mucuna bracteata
- Mucuna macrocarpa
- Mucuna pruriens
- Ormosia sumatrana
- Pachyrhizus erosus
- Phaseolus vulgaris
- Phylacium majus
- Pterocarpus macrocarpus
- Pueraria alopecuroides
- Pueraria imbricata
- Pueraria mirifica
- Pueraria phaseoloides
- Pueraria stricta
- Pueraria wallichii
- Pycnospora lutescens
- Rhynchosia bracteata
- Shuteria hirsuta
- Shuteria involucrata
- Smithia ciliata
- Spatholobus parviflorus
- Spatholobus spirei
- Spatholobus suberectus
- Stylosanthes sundaica
- Tephrosia kerrii
- Tephrosia purpurea
- Teyleria barbata
- Uraria campanulata
- Uraria cordifolia
- Uraria lacei
- Uraria lagopodioides
- Uraria poilanei
- Vigna dalzelliana
- Vigna grahamiana
- Vigna radiata
- Vigna umbellata
- Vigna vexillata
- Zornia gibbosa

==== Rosaceae ====
- Agrimonia nepalensis
- Eriobotrya bengalensis
- Parinari anamensis
- Prunus arborea
- Prunus cerasoides
- Prunus javanica
- Prunus wallichii
- Rubus alceifolius
- Rubus blepharoneurus
- Rubus ellipticus
- Rubus sorbifolius
- Sorbus verrucosa

==== Saxifragaceae ====
- Dichroa febrifuga

==== Grossulariaceae (Escalloniaceae) ====
- Itea puberula
- Itea riparia
- Polyosma elongata

==== Droseraceae ====
- Drosera burmanni
- Drosera peltata

==== Rhizophoraceae ====
- Carallia brachiata

==== Combretaceae ====
- Anogeissus acuminata
- Calycopteris floribunda
- Combretum deciduum
- Combretum griffithii
- Combretum latifolium
- Combretum procursum
- Combretum punctatum
- Quisqualis indica
- Terminalia alata
- Terminalia bellirica
- Terminalia chebula
- Terminalia glaucifolia
- Terminalia mucronata
- Terminalia triptera

==== Myrtaceae ====
- Decaspermum parviflorum
- Eugenia albiflora
- Eugenia cinerea
- Eugenia claviflora
- Eugenia cumini
- Eugenia formosa
- Eugenia fruticosa
- Eugenia aff. globiflora
- Eugenia grata
- Eugenia megacarpa
- Eugenia oblata
- Eugenia tetragona
- Tristaniopsis burmanica

==== Lecythidaceae ====
- Careya arborea

==== Melastomataceae ====
- Melastoma malabathricum
- Memecylon plebejum
- Memecylon scutellatum
- Osbeckia chinensis
- Osbeckia stellata
- Sonerila erecta
- Sonerila griffithii

==== Lythraceae ====
- Ammannia baccifera
- Lagerstroemia cochinchinensis
- Lagerstroemia macrocarpa
- Lagerstroemia venusta
- Lagerstroemia villosa
- Rotala diversifolia
- Rotala mexicana
- Rotala rotundifolia

==== Crypteroniaceae ====
- Crypteronia paniculata

==== Sonneratiaceae ====
- Duabanga grandiflora

==== Onagraceae ====
- Ludwigia adscendens
- Ludwigia hyssopifolia

==== Passifloraceae ====
- Adenia cardiophylla
- Adenia heterophylla
- Adenia pinnasecta
- Passiflora foetida
- Passiflora siamica

==== Cucurbitaceae ====
- Coccinia grandis
- Cucumis cf. hystrix
- Cucumis maderaspatanus
- Gomphogyne heterosperma
- Gymnopetalum chinense
- Gynostemma pentaphyllum
- Hodgsonia heteroclita
- Luffa cylindrica
- Momordica charantia
- Neoalsomitra angustipetala
- Neoalsomitra integrifoliola
- Neoalsomitra sarcophylla
- Solena amplexicaulis
- Thladiantha hookeri
- Trichosanthes ovigera
- Trichosanthes rubriflos
- Trichosanthes smilacifolia
- Trichosanthes tricuspidata
- Zehneria marginata
- Zehneria maysorensis
- Zehneria wallichii

==== Begoniaceae ====
- Begonia acetosella
- Begonia integrifolia
- Begonia laciniata
- Begonia martabanica
- Begonia siamensis
- Begonia aff. sinensis
- Begonia yunnanensis

==== Datiscaceae ====
- Tetrameles nudiflora

==== Aizoaceae ====
- Glinus oppositifolius
- Mollugo pentaphylla

==== Umbelliferae ====
- Centella asiatica
- Hydrocotyle asiatica
- Oenanthe javanica
- Seseli siamicum

==== Araliaceae ====
- Aralia montana
- Brassaiopsis ficifolia
- Brassaiopsis glomerulata
- Heptapleurum bengalense
- Heptapleurum calyptratum
- Heteropanax fragrans
- Macropanax dispermus
- Trevesia palmata

==== Alangiaceae ====
- Alangium barbatum
- Alangium chinense
- Alangium kurzii
- Alangium salviifolium

==== Comaceae ====
- Mastixia euonymoides

==== Nyssaceae ====
- Nyssa javanica

==== Caprifoliaceae ====
- Lonicera ferruginea
- Lonicera siamensis
- Sambucus javanica
- Viburnum cylindricum
- Viburnum inopinatum

==== Rubiaceae ====
- Adina trichotoma
- Aidia yunnanensis
- Anthocephalus chinensis
- Aphaenandra uniflora
- Argostemma ebracteolatum
- Argostemma khasianum
- Argostemma verticillatum
- Borreria alata
- Borreria brachystema
- Borreria laevis
- Borreria repens
- Canthium glabrum
- Canthium parvifolium
- Canthium umbellatum
- Catunaregam longispina
- Catunaregam spathulifolia
- Ceriscoides sessiliflora
- Ceriscoides turgida
- Cinchona pubescens
- Dioecrescis erythroclada
- Duperrea pavettifolia
- Fagerlindia sinensis
- Gardenia obtusifolia
- Gardenia sootepensis
- Geophila repens
- Haldina cordifolia
- Hedyotis auricularia
- Hedyotis coronaria
- Hedyotis corymbosa
- Hedyotis diffusa
- Hedyotis gracilipes
- Hedyotis lindleyana
- Hedyotis nalampooni
- Hedyotis ovatifolia
- Hedyotis pahompokae
- Hedyotis pinifolia
- Hedyotis quadrilocularis
- Hedyotis tenelliflora
- Hedyotis vestita
- Hymenodictyon orixense
- Hymenopogon parasiticus
- Hyptianthera bracteata
- Ixora butterwickii
- Ixora cibdela
- Ixora kerrii
- Knoxia brachycarpa
- Knoxia corymbosa
- Knoxia mollis
- Lasianthus kurzii
- Lasianthus lucidus
- Mitracarpus villosus
- Mitragyna hirsuta
- Mitragyna rotundifolia
- Morinda angustifolia
- Morinda tomentosa
- Mussaenda kerrii
- Mussaenda parva
- Mussaenda sanderiana
- Mycetia glandulosa
- Mycetia gracilis
- Mycetia longifolia
- Mycetia rivicola
- Ophiorrhiza hispidula
- Ophiorrhiza ridleyana
- Ophiorrhiza rosea
- Ophiorrhiza villosa
- Oxyceros horridus
- Paederia pallida
- Paederia pilifera
- Paederia scandens
- Paederia wallichii
- Pavetta fruticosa
- Pavetta indica
- Pavetta tomentosa
- Prismatomeris tetrandra
- Psychotria adenophylla
- Psychotria monticola
- Psychotria ophioxyloides
- Psychotria siamica
- Rothmannia sootepensis
- Rubia siamensis
- Saprosma sp.
- Spiradiclis caespitosa
- Tarenna vanprukii
- Tarennoidea wallichii
- Uncaria macrophylla
- Vangueria (Meyna) pubescens
- Wendlandia scabra
- Wendlandia tinctoria

==== Valerianaceae ====
- Valeriana hardwickii

==== Compositae ====
- Adenostemma lavenia
- Ageratum conyzoides
- Anaphalis adnata
- Anaphalis margaritacea
- Artemisia indica
- Bidens pilosa
- Blumea balsamifera
- Blumea clarkei
- Blumea fistulosa
- Blumea gardneri
- Blumea hossei
- Blumea lacera
- Blumea laciniata
- Blumea lanceolaria
- Blumea membranacea
- Blumea mollis
- Blumea napifolia
- Blumea sessiliflora
- Blumeopsis flava
- Camchaya eberhardtii
- Cissampelopsis corifolia
- Conyza japonica
- Conyza leucantha
- Conyza stricta
- Conyza sumatrensis
- Crassocephalum crepidioides
- Crepis chloroclada
- Cyathocline purpurea
- Dichrocephala integrifolia
- Eclipta prostrata
- Elephantopus scaber
- Emilia prenanthoidea
- Emilia sonchifolia
- Ethulia conyzoides
- Eupatorium adenophorum
- Eupatorium cannabinum
- Eupatorium odoratum
- Galinsoga parviflora
- Gnaphalium affine
- Gnaphalium hypoleucum
- Gnaphalium polycaulon
- Grangea maderaspatana
- Gynura integrifolia
- Gynura longifolia
- Gynura pseudochina
- Inula cappa
- Inula indica
- Inula nervosa
- Inula wissmanniana
- Ixeridium sagittarioides
- Lactuca parishii
- Laggera alata
- Laggera aurita
- Laggera pterodonta
- Leucomeris decora
- Microglossa pyrifolia
- Mikania cordata
- Piloselloides hirsuta
- Pluchea polygonata
- Pterocaulon redolens
- Saussurea peguensis
- Sigesbeckia orientalis
- Sonchus arvensis
- Sonchus oleraceus
- Sphaeranthus indicus
- Spilanthes paniculata
- Synedrella nodiflora
- Synotis triligulata
- Tithonia diversifolia
- Tricholepis karensium
- Tridax procumbens
- Vernonia andersonii
- Vernonia cinerea
- Vernonia divergens
- Vernonia parishii
- Vernonia roxburghii
- Vernonia silhetensis
- Vernonia squamosa
- Vernonia sutepensis
- Vernonia volkameriifolia
- Wedelia montana
- Xanthium inaequilaterum
- Youngia japonica

==== Campanulaceae ====
- Codonopsis celebica
- Codonopsis javanica
- Codonopsis parviflora
- Lobelia alsinoides
- Lobelia nicotianifolia
- Lobelia zeylanica
- Pratia begonifolia
- Wahlenbergia marginata

==== Sphenocleaceae ====
- Sphenoclea zeylanica

==== Ericaceae ====
- Agapetes hosseana
- Agapetes thailandica
- Craibiodendron stellatum
- Lyonia ovalifolia
- Rhododendron moulmainense
- Rhododendron veitchianum
- Vaccinium sprengelii

==== Monotropaceae ====
- Monotropa hypopitys

==== Primulaceae ====
- Lysimachia lancifolia
- Lysimachia peduncularis
- Lysimachia remotiflon

==== Plantaginaceae ====
- Plantago major

==== Myrsinaceae ====
- Ardisia arborescens
- Ardisia attenuata
- Ardisia corymbifera
- Ardisia crenata
- Ardisia kerrii
- Ardisia maculosa
- Ardisia villosa
- Ardisia virens
- Embelia impressa
- Embelia oblongifolia
- Embelia pulchella
- Embelia sessiliflora
- Embelia sootepensis
- Embelia subcoriacea
- Embelia tsjeriam-cottam
- Maesa montana
- Maesa permollis
- Maesa ramentacea
- Rapanea yunnanensis

==== Sapotaceae ====
- Madhuca stipulacea
- Palaquium garrettii
- Pouteria grandifolia
- Sarcosperma arboreum
- Xantolis burmanica

==== Ebenaceae ====
- Diospyros castanea
- Diospyros coaetanea
- Diospyros ehretioides
- Diospyros ferrea
- Diospyros glandulosa
- Diospyros malabarica
- Diospyros martabanica
- Diospyros mollis
- Diospyros montana
- Diospyros pilosanthera
- Diospyros rhodocalyx
- Diospyros undulata
- Diospyros winitii

==== Symplocaceae ====
- Symplocos cochinchinensis
- Symplocos hookeri
- Symplocos macrophylla
- Symplocos racemosa
- Symplocos sumuntia

==== Styracaceae ====
- Styrax benzoides

==== Oleaceae ====
- Chionanthus mala-elengi
- Chionanthus ramiflorus
- Chionanthus sutepensis
- Fraxinus floribunda
- Jasminum attenuatum
- Jasminum funale
- Jasminum nervosum
- Jasminum scandens
- Jasminum siamense
- Myxopyrum smilacifolium
- Olea dioica
- Olea rosea
- Olea salicifolia
- Schrebera swietenioides

==== Apocynaceae ====
- Aganosma cymosa
- Aganosma marginata
- Aganosma siamensis
- Alstonia rostrata
- Alstonia scholaris
- Alyxia siamensis
- Amalocalyx microlobus
- Carissa spinarum
- Chonemorpha megacalyx
- Chonemorpha verrucosa
- Holarrhena pubescens
- Ichnocarpus frutescens
- Melodinus cochinchinensis
- Parameria laevigata
- Pottsia laxiflora
- Rauvolfia serpentina
- Rauvolfia verticillata
- Trachelospermum asiaticum
- Urceola micrantha
- Wrightia arborea

==== Asclepiadaceae ====
- Atherolepis pierrei
- Ceropegia sootepensis
- Cryptolepis buchananii
- Cynanchum corymbosum
- Dischidia imbricata
- Dischidia major
- Dischidia nummularia
- Dischidia obcordata
- Dischidia singularis
- Dischidia sp.
- Genianthus laurifolius
- Gymnema griffithii
- Heterostemma siamicum
- Hoya engleriana
- Hoya kerrii
- Hoya siamica
- Hoya thomsonii
- Hoya verticillata
- Marsdenia cambodiensis
- Marsdenia aff. eriocaulis
- Marsdenia aff. tenacissima
- Marsdenia tenacissima
- Marsdenia thyrsiflora
- Marsdenia tinctoria
- Myriopteron extensum
- Oxystelma esculentum
- Raphistemma pulchellum
- Streptocaulon juventas
- Telosma pallida
- Toxocarpus aff. grifpthii
- Toxocarpus villosus
- Vincetoxicum sp. (as Tylophora sp.)
- Vincetoxicum fasciculatum (syn. Tylophora fasciculata)
- Vincetoxicum himalaicum (as Tylophora aff. himalaica)
- Vincetoxicum irrawadense (syn. Tylophora purpurea)
- Vincetoxicum rotundifolium (syn. Tylophora rotundifolia)
- Vincetoxicum sootepense (syn. Tylophora sootepensis)
- Zygostelma benthamii

==== Loganiaceae ====
- Buddleja asiatica
- Fagraea ceilanica
- Mitreola petiolata
- Strychnos nux-vomica

==== Gentianaceae ====
- Canscora decussata
- Canscora diffusa
- Exacum pteranthum
- Exacum sutaepense
- Exacum tetragonum
- Swertia angustifolia
- Swertia kachinensis

==== Hydrophyllaceae ====
- Hydrolea zeylanica

==== Boraginaceae ====
- Cordia mhaya
- Cynoglossum lanceolatum
- Ehretia acuminata
- Heliotropium indicum
- Tournefortia intonsa

==== Convolvulaceae ====
- Argyreia aggregata
- Argyreia capitiformis
- Argyreia henryi
- Argyreia kerrii
- Argyreia obtecta
- Argyreia osyrensis
- Argyreia wallichii
- Blinkworthia lycioides
- Cuscuta reflexa
- Erycibe subspicata
- Evolvulus alsinoides
- Ipomoea aquatica
- Ipomoea cairica
- Ipomoea hederifolia
- Ipomoea nil
- Ipomoea obscura
- Ipomoea pes-tigridis
- Ipomoea siamensis
- Ipomoea sinensis
- Ipomoea sp.
- Jacquemontia paniculata
- Merremia umbellata
- Merremia vitifolia
- Operculina turpethum
- Porana racemosa
- Porana spectabilis

==== Solanaceae ====
- Capsicum aff. chamaecerasus
- Physalis angulata
- Solanum barbisetum
- Solanum macrodon
- Solanum nigrum
- Solanum torvum
- Solanum verbascifolium

==== Scrophulariaceae ====
- Adenosma hirsutum
- Alectra avensis
- Buchnera cruciata
- Centranthera cochinchinensis
- Limnophila chinensis
- Limnophila hayatae
- Limnophila indica
- Limnophila repens
- Limnophila rugosa
- Lindenbergia indica
- Lindenbergia philippensis
- Lindernia anagallis
- Lindernia antipoda
- Lindernia ciliata
- Lindemia crustacea
- Lindernia hookeri
- Lindernia montana
- Lindernia pusilla
- Lindernia viscosa
- Mazus pumilus
- Scoparia dulcis
- Sopubia fastigiata
- Sopubia trifida
- Striga asiatica
- Striga masuria
- Torenia benthamiana
- Torenia flava
- Torenia thorelii
- Torenia violacea

==== Orobanchaceae ====
- Aeginetia indica
- Aeginetia pedunculata

==== Lentibulariaceae ====
- Utricularia aurea
- Utricularia bifida
- Utricularia caerulea
- Utricularia exoleta
- Utricularia scandens
- Utricularia striatula

==== Gesneriaceae ====
- Aeschynanthus hildebrandii
- Aeschynanthus hosseusii
- Aeschynanthus lineatus
- Aeschynanthus macranthus
- Chirita anachoreta
- Chirita brevipes
- Chirita hamosa
- Chirita micromusa
- Chirita pumila
- Didymocarpus aureoglandulosus
- Didymocarpus kerrii
- Didymocarpus siamensis
- Didymocarpus wattianus
- Epithema carnosum
- Leptoboea multiflora
- Paraboea kerrii
- Petrocosmea kerrii
- Rhynchoglossum obliquum
- Rhynchotechum ellipticum
- Rhynchotechum obovatum
- Stauranthera grandiflora
- Streptocarpus orientalis

==== Bignoniaceae ====
- Fernandoa adenophylla
- Jacaranda obtusifolia
- Markhamia stipulata
- Millingtonia hortensis
- Oroxylum indicum
- Radermachera glandulosa
- Radermachera ignea
- Stereospermum colais
- Stereospermum fimbriatum
- Stereospermum neuranthum

==== Acanthaceae ====
- Andrographis laxiflora
- Andrographis paniculata
- Asystasia hispida
- Asystasia salicifolia
- Asystasiella neesiana
- Barleria cristata
- Barleria strigosa
- Chroesthes lanceolata
- Dicliptera roxburghiana
- Dipteracanthus repens
- Eranthemum tetragonum
- Gymnostachyum signatum
- Hemigraphis glaucescens
- Hypoestes aff. purpurea
- Justicia comata
- Justicia procumbens
- Justicia quadrifaria
- Justicia aff. quadrifaria
- Justicia ventricosa
- Mananthes pallida
- Nelsonia canescens
- Neuracanthus tetragonostachyus
- Ophiorrhiziphyllon macrobotryum
- Perilepta siamensis
- Peristrophe bicalyculata
- Peristrophe lanceolaria
- Phaulopsis dorsiflora
- Phlogacanthus curviflorus
- Pseuderanthemum aff. crenulatum
- Pseuderanthemum latifolium
- Pseuderanthemum parishii
- Ruellia tuberosa
- Rungia parviflora
- Sericocalyx quadrifarius
- Sericocalyx schomburgkii
- Staurogyne obtusa
- Strobilanthes anfractuosus
- Strobilanthes apricus
- Strobilanthes argentea
- Strobilanthes consors
- Strobilanthes imbricata
- Strobilanthes aff. mucronato-productus
- Strobilanthes rubroglandulosus
- Strobilanthes serrata
- Strobilanthes viscidus
- Thunbergia alata
- Thunbergia coccinea
- Thunbergia geoffrayi
- Thunbergia laurifolia
- Thunbergia similis

==== Verbenaceae ====
- Callicarpa arborea
- Callicarpa rubella
- Clerodendrum disparifolium
- Clerodendrum fragrans
- Clerodendrum glandulosum
- Clerodendrum infortunatum
- Clerodendrum paniculatum
- Clerodendrum serratum
- Congea tomentosa
- Gmelina arborea
- Lantana camara
- Premna fulva
- Premna herbacea
- Premna latifolia
- Premna nana
- Premna pyramidata
- Premna scandens
- Premna villosa
- Sphenodesme pentandra
- Symphorema involucratum
- Tectona grandis
- Vitex canescens
- Vitex glabrata
- Vitex limonifolia
- Vitex peduncularis
- Vitex quinata

==== Labiatae ====
- Achyrospermum densiflorum
- Ajuga bracteosa
- Anisomeles indica
- Colquhounia elegans
- Elsholtzia blanda
- Elsholtzia winitiana
- Eurysolen gracilis
- Gomphostemma lucidum
- Gomphostemma strobilinum
- Gomphostemma wallichii
- Hyptis capitata
- Hyptis suaveolens
- Leucas aspera
- Leucas flaccida
- Orthosiphon aristatus
- Orthosiphon rubicundus
- Orthosiphon sp.
- Platostoma coloratum
- Platostoma siamense
- Platostoma sp.
- Plectranthus coetsa
- Plectranthus glabratus
- Plectranthus hispidus
- Plectranthus lophanthoides
- Plectranthus ternifolius
- Pogostemon auricularius
- Pogostemon menthoides
- Pogostemon purpurascens
- Pogostemon wattii
- Salvia riparia
- Scutellaria glandulosa
- Teucrium quadrifarium

==== Nyctaginaceae ====
- Boerhavia diffusa
- Mirabilis jalapa

==== Basellaceae ====
- Basella alba

==== Chenopodiaceae ====
- Chenopodium ficifolium

==== Amaranthaceae ====
- Achyranthes bidentata
- Aerva sanguinolenta
- Alternanthera paronychioides
- Alternanthera pungens
- Altemanthera sessilis
- Amaranthus spinosus
- Amaranthus viridis
- Psilotrichum ferrugineum

==== Polygonaceae ====
- Fagopyrum esculentum
- Polygonum barbatum
- Polygonum chinense
- Polygonum flaccidum
- Polygonum nepalense
- Polygonum odoratum
- Polygonum plebeium

==== Aristolochiaceae ====
- Aristolochia grandis
- Aristolochia kerrii
- Aristolochia pierrei
- Aristolochia tagala
- Aristolochia versicolor

==== Rafflesiaceae ====
- Sapria himalayana

==== Piperaceae ====
- Peperomia pellucida
- Peperomia tetraphylla
- Piper argyrophyllum
- Piper boehmeriifolium
- Piper longum
- Piper muricatum
- Piper aff. pedicellatum
- Piper aff. peepuloides
- Piper retrofractum

==== Chloranthaceae ====
- Chloranthus erectus
- Chloranthus nervosus
- Sarcandra glabra

==== Myristicaceae ====
- Horsfieldia amygdalina
- Horsfieldia thorelii
- Knema conferta
- Knema laurina

==== Lauraceae ====
- Actinodaphne henryi
- Alseodaphne andersonii
- Beilschmiedia aff. intermedia
- Beilschmiedia aff. percoriacea
- Cinnamomum camphora
- Cinnamomum caudatum
- Cinnamomum iners
- Cinnamomum longipetiolatum
- Cryptocarya amygdalina
- Lindera caudata
- Litsea albicans
- Litsea cubeba
- Litsea firma
- Litsea glutinosa
- Litsea monopetala
- Litsea salicifolia
- Litsea semecarpifolia
- Litsea zeylanica
- Machilus bombycina
- Persea chartacea
- Phoebe cathia
- Phoebe lanceolata
- Phoebe aff. pallida
- Phoebe aff. neuranthoides
- Potameia siamensis

==== Hernandiaceae ====
- Illigera thorelii
- Illigera trifoliata

==== Proteaceae ====
- Helicia formosana
- Helicia nilagirica
- Heliciopsis terminalis

==== Thymelaeaceae ====
- Aquilaria crassna
- Daphne sureil
- Enkleia siamensis
- Linostoma persimile

==== Loranthaceae ====
- Dendrophthoe curvata
- Dendrophthoe lanosa
- Dendrophthoe pentandra
- Elytranthe albida
- Ginalloa siamica
- Helixanthera parasitica
- Helixanthera pulchra
- Macrosolen avenis
- Macrosolen lowii
- Scurrula atropurpurea
- Scurrula ferruginea
- Scurrula parasitica
- Viscum articulatum
- Viscum orientale
- Viscum ovalifolium

==== Santalaceae ====
- Scleropyrum wallichianum

==== Opiliaceae ====
- Cansjera rheedei
- Lepionurus sylvestris
- Melientha suavis
- Opilia amentacea

==== Balanophoraceae ====
- Balanophora abbreviata
- Balanophora fungosa
- Balanophora latisepala
- Balanophora laxiflora

==== Euphorbiaceae ====
- Acalypha brachystachya
- Acalypha kerrii
- Alchornea tiliifolia
- Aleurites moluccana
- Antidesma acidum
- Antidesma bunius
- Antidesma ghaesembilla
- Antidesma montanum
- Antidesma sootepense
- Aporosa villosa
- Aporosa wallichii
- Baccaurea ramiflora
- Baliospermum solanifolium (syn. Baliospermum montanum)
- Baliospermum siamense
- Balakata baccata
- Bischofia javanica
- Breynia fruticosa
- Breynia glauca
- Bridelia affinis
- Bridelia glauca
- Bridelia retusa
- Bridelia stipularis
- Bridelia tomentosa
- Cleidion spiciflorum
- Cleistanthus hirsutulus
- Croton crassifolius
- Croton lachnocarpus
- Croton robustus
- Croton roxburghii
- Dalechampia elongata
- Daphniphyllum laurinum
- Euphorbia bifida
- Euphorbia heterophylla
- Euphorbia hirta
- Euphorbia lacei
- Euphorbia parviflora
- Euphorbia prostrata
- Euphorbia pulcherrima
- Euphorbia thymifolia
- Falconeria insignis
- Glochidion acuminatum
- Glochidion assamicum
- Glochidion coccineum
- Glochidion eriocarpum
- Glochidion hongkongense
- Glochidion kerrii
- Glochidion sphaerogynum
- Homonoia riparia
- Macaranga denticulata
- Macaranga kurzii
- Mallotus barbatus
- Mallotus khasianus
- Mallotus oblongifolius
- Mallotus paniculatus
- Mallotus peltatus
- Mallotus philippensis
- Mallotus pierrei
- Mallotus repandus
- Megistostigma burmanicum
- Ostodes paniculata
- Phyllanthus amarus
- Phyllanthus columnaris
- Phyllanthus emblica
- Phyllanthus kerrii
- Phyllanthus reticulatus
- Phyllanthus roseus
- Phyllanthus sootepensis
- Phyllanthus urinaria
- Phyllanthus virgatus
- Sauropus amoebiflorus
- Sauropus bicolor
- Sauropus garrettii
- Sauropus hirsutus
- Sauropus orbicularis
- Sauropus orbilaris
- Sauropus quadrangularis
- Sauropus similis
- Securinega virosa
- Suregada multiflora
- Trewia nudiflora

==== Ulmaceae ====
- Celtis tetrandra
- Celtis timorensis
- Holoptelea integrifolia
- Trema orientalis
- Ulmus lanceifolia

==== Moraceae ====
- Artocarpus gomezianus
- Artocarpus lakoocha
- Artocarpus lanceolata
- Broussonetia kurzii
- Broussonetia papyrifera
- Ficus abelii
- Ficus altissima
- Ficus auriculata
- Ficus benjamina
- Ficus callosa
- Ficus capillipes
- Ficus curtipes
- Ficus cyrtophylla
- Ficus fistulosa
- Ficus geniculata
- Ficus glaberrima
- Ficus hederacea
- Ficus heterophylla
- Ficus heteropleura
- Ficus hirta
- Ficus hispida
- Ficus laevis
- Ficus lyrata
- Ficus microcarpa
- Ficus obtusifolia
- Ficus parietalis
- Ficus pisocarpa
- Ficus pubigera
- Ficus racemosa
- Ficus rumphii
- Ficus sagittata
- Ficus sarmentosa
- Ficus semicordata
- Ficus squamosa
- Ficus subulata
- Ficus superba
- Ficus variegata
- Ficus virens
- Ficus sp.
- Maclura amboinensis
- Maclura cochinchinensis
- Maclura fruticosa
- Morus macroura
- Streblus asper
- Streblus taxoides

==== Urticaceae ====
- Boehmeria chiangmaiensis
- Boehmeria clidemioides
- Boehmeria diffusa
- Boehmeria hamiltoniana
- Boehmeria macrophylla
- Boehmeria pilosiuscula
- Boehmeria pseudotomentosa
- Boehmeria thailandica
- Boehmeria zollingeriana
- Debregeasia longifolia
- Debregeasia squamata
- Dendrocnide sinuata
- Distemon indicum
- Elatostema integrifolium
- Elatostema lineolatum
- Elatostema longipes
- Elatostema monandrum
- Elatostema platyphyllum
- Girardinia hibiscifolia
- Laportea bulbifera
- Laportea interrupta
- Maoutia puya
- Oreocnide rubescens
- Pellionia latifolia
- Pellionia repens
- Pilea anisophylla
- Pilea microphylla
- Pilea trinervia
- Pouzolzia hirta
- Pouzolzia pentandra
- Pouzolzia zeylanica

==== Juglandaceae ====
- Engelhardia serrata
- Engelhardia spicata

==== Betulaceae ====
- Betula alnoides
- Carpinus londoniana

==== Myricaceae ====
- Myrica esculenta

==== Fagaceae ====
- Castanopsis acuminatissima
- Castanopsis argyrophylla
- Castanopsis armata
- Castanopsis diversifolia
- Castanopsis indica
- Castanopsis rockii
- Castanopsis tribuloides
- Lithocarpus aggregatus
- Lithocarpus craibianus
- Lithocarpus elegans
- Lithocarpus fenestratus
- Lithocarpus finetii
- Lithocarpus garrettianus
- Lithocarpus lindleyanus
- Lithocarpus polystachyus
- Lithocarpus sootepensis
- Lithocarpus spicatus
- Lithocarpus thomsonii
- Lithocarpus truncatus
- Quercus aliena
- Quercus augustinei, syn. Quercus glabricupula
- Quercus brandisiana
- Quercus incana
- Quercus kerrii
- Quercus kingiana
- Quercus lanata
- Quercus lineata
- Quercus mespilifolia
- Quercus semiserrata
- Quercus vestita

==== Salicaceae ====
- Salix tetrasperma

=== Angiospermae, Monocotyledoneae ===
==== Butomaceae ====
- Limnocharis flava

==== Alismataceae ====
- Sagittaria trifolia

==== Triuridaceae ====
- Sciaphila thaidanica

==== Commelinaceae ====
- Amischotolype glabrata
- Amischotolype mollissima
- Aneilema discretum
- Aneilema divergens
- Aneilema herbaceum
- Aneilema ovatum
- Aneilema scaberrimum
- Aneilema sinicum
- Belosynapsis ciliata
- Commelina benghalensis
- Commelina diffusa
- Commelina longifolia
- Commelina paludosa
- Cyanotis axillaris
- Cyanotis cristata
- Floscopa scandens
- Murdannia loureiroi
- Murdannia nudiflora
- Murdannia scapiflora
- Pollia hasskarlii

==== Xyridaceae ====
- Xyris capensis
- Xyris pauciflora

==== Eriocaulaceae ====
- Eriocaulon oryzetorum
- Eriocaulon truncatum
- Eriocaulon aff. ubonense

==== Musaceae ====
- Musa acuminata
- Musa balbisiana
- Musa itinerans
- Musa sikkimensis

==== Zingiberaceae ====
- Alpinia blepharocalyx
- Alpinia galanga
- Alpinia malaccensis
- Amomum koenigii
- Amomum ovoideum
- Amomum repoeense
- Amomum siamense
- Amomum sp.
- Boesenbergia longiflora
- Boesenbergia longipes
- Boesenbergia rotunda
- Costus globosus
- Costus speciosus
- Curcuma aff. comosa
- Curcuma ecomata
- Curcuma longa
- Curcuma parviflora
- Curcuma zedoaria
- Etlingera littoralis
- Gagnepainia godefroyi
- Globba clarkei
- Globba kerrii
- Globba nisbetiana
- Globba nuda
- Globba purpurascens
- Globba reflexa
- Globba schomburgkii
- Globba villosula
- Globba xantholeuca
- Hedychium coccineum
- Hedychium ellipticum
- Hedychium gardnerianum
- Hedychium villosum
- Kaempferia elegans
- Kaempferia roscoeana
- Kaempferia rotunda
- Kaempferia siamensis
- Zingiber barbatum
- Zingiber bradleyanum
- Zingiber aff. integrum
- Zingiber kerrii
- Zingiber parishii
- Zingiber rubens
- Zingiber smilesianum
- Zingiber sp.

==== Marantaceae ====
- Donax canniformis
- Halopegia brachystachys
- Phrynium capitatum
- Stachyphrynium spicatum

==== Liliaceae ====
- Asparagus filicinus
- Aspidistra longifolia
- Aspidistra sutepensis
- Chlorophytum intermedium
- Dianella ensifolia
- Disporopsis longifolia
- Disporum calcaratum
- Disporum cantoniense
- Iphigenia indica
- Lilium primulinum
- Ophiopogon intermedius
- Ophiopogon longifolius
- Ophiopogon malcolmsonii
- Ophiopogon regnieri
- Ophiopogon reptans
- Paris polyphylla
- Peliosanthes teta
- Polygonatum kingianum
- Tupistra albiflora

==== Agavaceae ====
- Dracaena angustifolia

==== Amaryllidaceae ====
- Crinum wattii
- Curculigo capitulata
- Curculigo gracilis
- Curculigo latifolia
- Hypoxis aurea

==== Iridaceae ====
- Iris collettii

==== Smilacaceae ====
- Smilax corbularia
- Smilax lanceifolia
- Smilax megacarpa
- Smilax ovalifolia
- Smilax perfoliata
- Smilax verticalis
- Smilax zeylanica

==== Araceae ====
- Acorus gramineus
- Aglaonema simplex
- Alocasia acuminata
- Alocasia macrorrhizos
- Alocasia navicularis
- Amorphophallus corrugatus
- Amorphophallus fuscus
- Amorphophallus aff. koratensis
- Amorphophallus krausei
- Amorphophallus longituberosus
- Amorphophallus macrorhizus
- Amorphophallus paeoniifolius
- Amorphophallus thaiensis
- Amorphophallus yunnanensis
- Arisaema album
- Arisaema consanguineum
- Arisaema cuspidatum
- Arisaema erubescens
- Arisaema kerrii
- Arisaema maxwellii
- Arisaema prazeri
- Colocasia affinis
- Colocasia antiquorum
- Colocasia esculenta
- Colocasia fallax
- Epipremnum giganteum
- Hapaline benthamiana
- Homalomena aromatica
- Homalomena occulta
- Lasia spinosa
- Lemna sp.
- Leucocasia gigantea
- Pothos chinensis
- Remusatia hookeriana
- Remusatia pumila
- Remusatia vivipara
- Rhaphidophora chevalieri
- Rhaphidophora glauca
- Rhaphidophora hookeri
- Rhaphidophora megaphylla
- Rhaphidophora peepla
- Sauromatum horsfieldii
- Typhonium hirsutum
- Typhonium horsfieldii
- Typhonium trilobatum

Araceae species listed in Sungkajanttranon et al. (2019):

Species	Forest type	Notes	> 1400 m
Alocasia acuminata	lower montane forest	evergreen; geophyte	
Alocasia navicularis	deciduous dipterocarp forest	evergreen; geophyte	
Amorphophallus fuscus	lower montane forest	deciduous; geophyte	
Amorphophallus krausei	dry evergreen forest	deciduous; geophyte	
Amorphophallus thaiensis	lower montane forest	deciduous; geophyte	
Amorphophallus yunnanensis	lower montane forest	deciduous; geophyte	
Arisaema consanguineum	lower montane forest	deciduous; geophyte	check
Arisaema kerrii	lower montane forest	deciduous; geophyte	check
Arisaema maxwellii	dry evergreen forest, lower montane forest	deciduous; geophyte	
Colocasia affinis	dry evergreen forest, lower montane forest	deciduous; geophyte	
Colocasia esculenta	deciduous dipterocarp forest	evergreen; helophyte	
Hapaline benthamiana	dry evergreen forest	deciduous; geophyte	
Homalomena aromatica	lower montane forest	evergreen; geophyte/lithophyte	
Lasia spinosa	dry evergreen forest	evergreen; helophyte	
Lemna sp.	deciduous dipterocarp forest	evergreen; hydrophyte	
Remusatia hookeriana	lower montane forest	deciduous; epiphyte	check
Rhaphidophora chevalieri	dry evergreen forest	evergreen; epiphyte/lithophyte	
Rhaphidophora megaphylla	dry evergreen forest	evergreen; epiphyte/lithophyte	
Rhaphidophora peepla	lower montane forest	evergreen; epiphyte/lithophyte	check
Sauromatum horsfieldii	lower montane forest	deciduous; geophyte	check

==== Stemonaceae ====
- Stemona burkillii
- Stemona kerrii
- Stemona tuberosa

==== Dioscoreaceae ====
- Dioscorea alata
- Dioscorea arachidna
- Dioscorea birmanica
- Dioscorea bulbifera
- Dioscorea decipiens
- Dioscorea esculenta
- Dioscorea glabra
- Dioscorea hamiltonii
- Dioscorea hispida
- Dioscorea kamoonensis
- Dioscorea kerrii
- Dioscorea membranacea
- Dioscorea pentaphylla
- Dioscorea prazeri
- Dioscorea pseudonitens
- Dioscorea rockii

==== Palmae ====
- Areca laosensis
- Calamus arborescens
- Calamus kerrianus
- Livistona speciosa
- Phoenix loureiri
- Plectocomia kerriana
- Wallichia caryotoides

==== Pandanaceae ====
- Pandanus penetrans

==== Apostasiaceae ====
- Apostasia wallichii

==== Taccaceae ====
- Tacca chantrieri
- Tacca integrifolia

==== Burmanniaceae ====
- Burmannia coelestis
- Burmannia wallichii

==== Orchidaceae ====
- Acanthephippium striatum
- Acriopsis indica
- Aerides falcata
- Anoectochilus brevistylus
- Anoectochilus elwesii
- Anoectochilus repens
- Anoectochilus siamensis
- Anoectochilus tortus
- Anthogonium gracile
- Aphyllorchis caudata
- Aphyllorchis montana
- Arundina graminifolia
- Brachycorythis helferi
- Brachycorythis henryi
- Bromheadia aporoides
- Bulbophyllum bittnerianum
- Bulbophyllum congestum
- Bulbophyllum morphologorum
- Bulbophyllum nigrescens
- Bulbophyllum propinquum
- Bulbophyllum secundum
- Bulbophyllum suavissimum
- Calanthe cardioglossa
- Calanthe clavata
- Cheirostylis griffithii
- Chiloschista parishii
- Chrysoglossum ornatum
- Cirrhopetalum retusiusculum
- Cleisomeria lanatum
- Cleisostoma arietinum
- Cleisostoma filiforme
- Cleisostoma fuerstenbergianum
- Cleisostoma racemiferum
- Cleisostoma rolfeanum
- Coelogyne lentiginosa
- Coelogyne schultesii
- Coelogyne trinervis
- Crepidium acuminatum
- Crepidium biauritum
- Crepidium calophyllum
- Crepidium orbiculare
- Cymbidium aloifolium
- Cymbidium dayanum
- Cymbidium ensifolium
- Cymbidium lancifolium
- Cymbidium siamense
- Cymbidium tracyanum
- Cyrtosia nana
- Dendrobium aphyllum
- Dendrobium cariniferum
- Dendrobium christyanum
- Dendrobium compactum
- Dendrobium crystallinum
- Dendrobium dixanthum
- Dendrobium falconeri
- Dendrobium fimbriatum
- Dendrobium gratiosissimum
- Dendrobium heterocarpum
- Dendrobium lindleyi
- Dendrobium moschatum
- Dendrobium ochreatum
- Dendrobium parcum
- Dendrobium porphyrophyllum
- Dendrobium primulinum
- Dendrobium pulchellum
- Dendrobium secundum
- Dendrobium senile
- Dendrobium signatum
- Dendrobium stuposum
- Dendrobium sutepense
- Dendrobium venustum
- Dendrobium wilmsianum
- Dendrobium sp.
- Didymoplexiella siamensis
- Diploprora championii
- Disperis siamensis
- Drymoda siamensis
- Epipogium roseum
- Eria acervata
- Eria affinis
- Eria bipunctata
- Eria pannea
- Eria perpusilla
- Eria siamensis
- Eria sutepensis
- Eulophia geniculata
- Eulophia nuda
- Eulophia pauciflora
- Eulophia siamensis
- Galeola integra
- Gastrodia exilis
- Geodorum attenuatum
- Geodorum citrinum
- Geodorum siamense
- Goodyera fumata
- Goodyera procera
- Goodyera thailandica
- Goodyera viridiflora
- Habenaria amplexicaulis
- Habenaria dentata
- Habenaria furcifera
- Habenaria holotricha
- Habenaria hosseusii
- Habenaria humistrata
- Habenaria limprichtii
- Habenaria lucida
- Habenaria malintana
- Habenaria medioflexa
- Habenaria rostellifera
- Habenaria stenopetala
- Habenaria viridiflora
- Liparis downii
- Liparis paradoxa
- Liparis regnieri
- Liparis siamensis
- Liparis sutepensis
- Liparis viridiflora
- Liparis wrayi
- Luisia thailandica
- Monomeria barbata
- Nervilia aragoana
- Nervilia calcicola
- Nervilia crociformis
- Nervilia plicata
- Oberonia acaulis
- Oberonia pachyphylla
- Ornithochilus difformis
- Otochilus albus
- Pachystoma pubescens
- Pecteilis susannae
- Peristylus constrictus
- Peristylus goodyeroides
- Peristylus gracilis
- Peristylus lacertifer
- Peristylus tentaculatus
- Phaius tankervilleae
- Phalaenopsis cornu-cervi
- Pholidota articulata
- Pholidota bracteata
- Pholidota convallariae
- Pholidota imbricata
- Polystachya concreta
- Rhynchogyna saccata
- Rhynchostylis coelestis
- Spathoglottis pubescens
- Staurochilus loratus
- Stereosandra javanica
- Sunipia racemosa
- Taeniophyllum glandulosum
- Tainia angustifolia
- Tainia hookeriana
- Tainia speciosa
- Tainia viridifusca
- Trichotosia dasyphylla
- Tropidia angulosa
- Tropidia curculigoides
- Tropidia pedunculata
- Vanda brunnea
- Vanilla siamensis
- Zeuxine affinis

==== Cyperaceae ====
- Abildgaardia ovata, syn. Fimbristylis ovata
- Bulbostylis barbata
- Bulbostylis densa
- Carex commixta
- Carex baccans
- Carex condensata
- Carex continua
- Carex cruciata
- Carex doisutepensis
- Carex filicina
- Carex horsfieldii
- Carex indica
- Carex perakensis
- Carex phacota
- Carex speciosa
- Carex tricephala
- Cyperus brevifolius
- Cyperus compactus
- Cyperus compressus
- Cyperus corymbosus
- Cyperus cuspidatus
- Cyperus cyperinus
- Cyperus cyperoides
- Cyperus difformis
- Cyperus distans
- Cyperus elatus
- Cyperus exaltatus
- Cyperus flavidus
- Cyperus haspan
- Cyperus imbricatus
- Cyperus involucratus
- Cyperus iria
- Cyperus kyllingia
- Cyperus laxus
- Cyperus leucocephalus
- Cyperus michelianus
- Cyperus niveus
- Cyperus nutans
- Cyperus pilosus
- Cyperus polystachyos
- Cyperus pumilus
- Cyperus rotundus
- Cyperus sesquiflorus
- Cyperus sulcinux
- Cyperus tenuiculmis
- Cyperus unioloides
- Eleocharis congesta
- Fimbristylis adenolepis
- Fimbristylis aestivalis
- Fimbristylis cinnamometorum
- Fimbristylis dichotoma
- Fimbristylis eragrostis
- Fimbristylis fimbristyloides
- Fimbristylis hookeriana
- Fimbristylis intonsa
- Fimbristylis merrillii
- Fimbristylis miliacea
- Fimbristylis nutans
- Fimbristylis schoenoides
- Fimbristylis straminea
- Fimbristylis tetragona
- Fimbristylis thomsonii
- Fimbristylis yunnanensis
- Fuirena ciliaris
- Fuirena umbellata
- Lipocarpha chinensis
- Lipocarpha hemisphaerica
- Lipocarpha pygmaea
- Rhynchospora rubra
- Rhynchospora rugosa
- Scirpus grossus
- Scirpus juncoides
- Scirpus mucronatus
- Scirpus siamensis
- Scirpus squarrosus
- Scirpus subcapitatus
- Scirpus ternatus
- Scleria benthamii
- Scleria ciliaris
- Scleria kerrii
- Scleria levis
- Scleria lithosperma
- Scleria mikawana
- Scleria pergracilis
- Scleria psilorrhiza
- Scleria reticulata
- Scleria scrobiculata
- Scleria terrestris

==== Poaceae ====
- Acroceras tonkinense
- Alloteropsis cimicina
- Alloteropsis semialata
- Andropogon chinensis
- Apluda mutica
- Apocopis courtallumensis
- Aristida chinensis
- Aristida cumingiana
- Arthraxon castratus
- Arthraxon lancifolius
- Arundinella bengalensis
- Arundinella nepalensis
- Arundinella setosa
- Bothriochloa bladhii
- Brachiaria ramosa
- Capillipedium assimile
- Capillipedium parviflorum
- Cenchrus brownii
- Centotheca lappacea
- Chloris barbata
- Chloris virgata
- Chrysopogon aciculatus
- Chrysopogon zizanioides
- Coix lacryma-jobi
- Cynodon dactylon
- Cyrtococcum accrescens
- Cyrtococcum oxyphyllum
- Dactyloctenium aegyptium
- Dichanthium caricosum
- Diectomis fastigiata
- Digitaria fibrosa
- Digitaria fuscescens
- Digitaria longiflora
- Digitaria setigera
- Digitaria siamensis
- Digitaria ternata
- Digitaria violascens
- Echinochloa colona
- Echinochloa crusgalli
- Eleusine indica
- Elytrophorus spicatus
- Enteropogon dolichostachyus
- Eragrostis amabilis
- Eragrostis montana
- Eragrostis nigra
- Eragrostis pilosa
- Eragrostis poaeoides
- Eragrostis unioloides
- Eulalia leschenaultiana
- Eulalia pallens
- Eulalia quadrinervis
- Eulalia siamensis
- Eulalia speciosa
- Eulaliopsis binata
- Garnotia acutigluma
- Garnotia patula
- Hemarthria compressa
- Heteropogon contortus
- Heteropogon triticeus
- Hyparrhenia rufa
- Imperata cylindrica
- Ischaemum rugosum
- Leersia hexandra
- Leptochloa chinensis
- Microstegium vagans
- Mnesithea granularis
- Mnesithea mollicoma
- Mnesithea striata
- Rottboellia cochinchinensis
- Oplismenus burmannii
- Oplismenus compositus
- Oryza meyeriana
- Ottochloa nodosa
- Panicum humile
- Panicum maximum
- Panicum miliaceum
- Panicum notatum
- Panicum repens
- Paspalum conjugatum
- Paspalum orbiculare
- Paspalum scrobiculatum
- Pennisetum pedicellatum
- Pennisetum polystachion
- Pennisetum purpureum
- Perotis indica
- Phragmites vallatoria
- Poa annua
- Pogonatherum paniceum
- Polytoca digitata
- Polytrias indica
- Pseudechinolaena polystachya
- Pseudopogonatherum contortum
- Pseudopogonatherum irritans
- Rhynchelytrum repens
- Saccharum arundinaceum
- Saccharum fallax
- Sacciolepis indica
- Schizachyrium brevifolium
- Schizachyrium sanguineum
- Sehima nervosum
- Setaria flavida
- Setaria palmifolia
- Setaria parviflora
- Setaria sphacelata
- Setaria verticillata
- Sorghum nitidum
- Sporobolus diandrus
- Sporobolus indicus
- Sporobolus tetragonus
- Themeda arguens
- Themeda arundinacea
- Themeda triandra
- Thysanolaena latifolia
- Tripogon trifidus
- Urochloa distachya
- Urochloa panicoides

===== Bambusoideae =====
- Ampelocalamus patellaris
- Bambusa bambos
- Bambusa burmanica
- Bambusa griffithiana
- Bambusa membranacea
- Bambusa pallida
- Bambusa tulda
- Bambusa vulgaris
- Cephalostachyum pergracile
- Dendrocalamus giganteus
- Dendrocalamus nudus
- Dinochloa macclellandii
- Gigantochloa albociliata
- Gigantochloa apus
- Teinostachyum dullooa
- Thyrsostachys oliveri

=== Gymnospermae ===
==== Cycadaceae ====
- Epicycas tonkinensis

==== Podocarpaceae ====
- Podocarpus neriifolius

==== Pinaceae ====
- Pinus kesiya
- Pinus latteri

==== Cephalotaxaceae ====
- Cephalotaxus griffithii

==== Cupressaceae ====
- Cupressus torulosa

==== Gnetaceae ====
- Gnetum leptostachyum
- Gnetum montanum

=== Pteridophyta ===
==== Psilotaceae ====
- Psilotum nudum

==== Lycopodiaceae ====
- Lycopodium cernuum
- Lycopodium squarrosum

==== Selaginellaceae ====
- Selaginella argentea
- Selaginella delicatula
- Selaginella helferi
- Selaginella involvens
- Selaginella kurzii
- Selaginella minutifolia
- Selaginella ostenfeldii
- Selaginella pennata
- Selaginella repanda
- Selaginella roxburghii

==== Equisetaceae ====
- Equisetum debile

==== Ophioglossaceae ====
- Ophioglossum petiolatum

==== Marattiaceae ====
- Angiopteris evecta

==== Gleicheniaceae ====
- Dicranopteris linearis
- Dicranopteris splendida

==== Schizaeaceae ====
- Lygodium flexuosum
- Lygodium giganteum
- Lygodium japonicum
- Lygodium polystachyum

==== Hymenophyllaceae ====
- Crepidomanes latealatum
- Hymenophyllum exsertum

==== Cyatheaceae ====
- Cyathea chinensis
- Cyathea gigantea
- Cyathea podophylla

==== Dennstaedtiaceae ====
- Hypolepis punctata
- Microlepia platyphylla
- Microlepia puberula
- Microlepia speluncae
- Microlepia strigosa
- Pteridium aquilinum

==== Lindsaeaceae ====
- Lindsaea chienii
- Lindsaea ensifolia
- Sphenomeris chinensis

==== Davalliaceae ====
- Araiostegia pulchra
- Davallia trichomanoides
- Davallodes membranulosum
- Gymnogrammitis dareiformis
- Leucostegia immersa
- Pachypleuria repens

==== Oleandraceae ====
- Nephrolepis biserrata
- Nephrolepis cordifolia
- Nephrolepis delicatula
- Oleandra undulata

==== Parkeriaceae ====
- Adiantum edgeworthii
- Adiantum erylliae
- Adiantum philippense
- Adiantum zollingeri
- Ceratopteris thalictroides
- Cheilanthes belangeri
- Cheilanthes pseudofarinosa
- Cheilanthes tenuifolia
- Coniogramme fraxinea
- Hemionitis arifolia
- Pityrogramma calomelanos

==== Vittariaceae ====
- Antrophyum callifolium
- Antrophyum parvulum
- Antrophyum winitii
- Vittaria flexuosa
- Vittaria sikkimensis

==== Pteridaceae ====
- Pteris asperula
- Pteris biaurita
- Pteris cretica
- Pteris decrescens
- Pteris ensiformis
- Pteris heteromorpha
- Pteris longipes
- Pteris venusta
- Pteris vittata
- Pteris wallichiana

==== Aspleniaceae ====
- Asplenium apogamum
- Asplenium bilabiatum
- Asplenium cheilosorum
- Asplenium crinicaule
- Asplenium ensiforme
- Asplenium excisum
- Asplenium macrophyllum
- Asplenium nidus
- Asplenium obscurum
- Asplenium rockii
- Asplenium yoshinagae

==== Blechnaceae ====
- Blechnum orientale
- Brainea insignis

==== Lomariopsidaceae ====
- Bolbitis appendiculata
- Bolbitis heteroclita
- Bolbitis hookeriana
- Bolbitis scalpturata
- Bolbitis sinensis
- Bolbitis virens
- Elaphoglossum marginatum
- Elaphoglossum yoshinagae

==== Dryopteridaceae ====
- Arachniodes henryi
- Diacalpe aspidioides
- Didymochlaena truncatula
- Dryopteris cochleata
- Dryopteris hirtipes
- Dryopteris integriloba
- Dryopteris neoassamensis
- Dryopteris pseudosparsa
- Pleocnemia irregularis
- Polystichum attenuatum
- Polystichum biaristatum
- Polystichum eximium
- Tectaria christii
- Tectaria fauriei
- Tectaria fuscipes
- Tectaria herpetocaulos
- Tectaria impressa

==== Thelypteridaceae ====
- Thelypteris arida
- Thelypteris ciliata
- Thelypteris confluens
- Thelypteris crinipes
- Thelypteris cylindrothrix
- Thelypteris dentata
- Thelypteris hirtisora
- Thelypteris hispidula
- Thelypteris interrupta
- Thelypteris lakhimpurensis
- Thelypteris nudata
- Thelypteris papilio
- Thelypteris parasitica
- Thelypteris repens
- Thelypteris subelata
- Thelypteris terminans
- Thelypteris truncata
- Thelypteris xylodes

==== Athyriaceae ====
- Anisocampium cumingianum
- Athyrium anisopterum
- Athyrium dissitifolium
- Cornopteris opaca
- Diplazium asperum
- Diplazium donianum
- Diplazium esculentum
- Diplazium leptophyllum
- Diplazium polypodioides
- Diplazium siamense
- Kuniwatsukia cuspidata

==== Polypodiaceae ====
- Aglaomorpha coronans
- Arthromeris amplexifolia
- Belvisia henryi
- Crypsinus cruciformis
- Crypsinus griffithianus
- Crypsinus oxylobus
- Crypsinus rhynchophyllus
- Drynaria bonii
- Drynaria fortunei
- Drynaria propinqua
- Drynaria rigidula
- Lepisorus bicolor
- Lepisorus heterolepis
- Lepisorus nudus
- Lepisorus scolopendrium
- Lepisorus subconfluens
- Leptochilus decurrens
- Leptochilus ellipticus
- Loxogramme chinensis
- Microsorum membranaceum
- Platycerium wallichii
- Polypodium amoenum
- Polypodium argutum
- Polypodium manmeiense
- Polypodium subauriculatum
- Pyrrosia adnascens
- Pyrrosia eberhardtii
- Pyrrosia lanceolata
- Pyrrosia mollis
- Pyrrosia porosa
- Pyrrosia stigmosa

==== Marsileaceae ====
- Marsilea crenata

==== Salviniaceae ====
- Salvinia cucullata

==== Azollaceae ====
- Azolla pinnata

== See also ==
- List of trees of northern Thailand, based on Gardner, Sidisunthorn & Anusarnsunthorn (2007)
- List of Thai provincial trees
