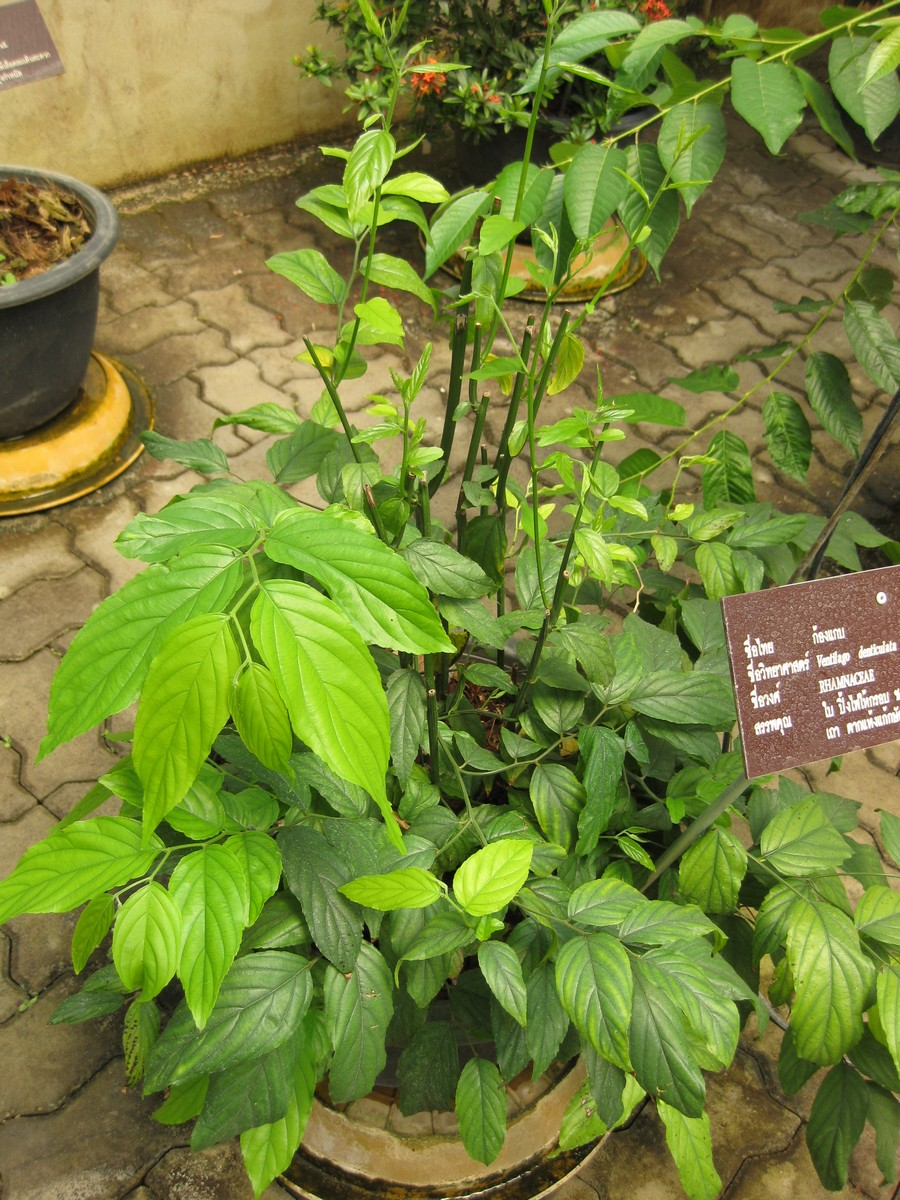

Scientific classification
- Kingdom: Plantae
- Clade: Tracheophytes
- Clade: Angiosperms
- Clade: Eudicots
- Clade: Rosids
- Order: Rosales
- Family: Rhamnaceae
- Genus: Ventilago
- Species: V. denticulata

Binomial name
- Ventilago denticulata Willd.

= Ventilago denticulata =

Species of tree

Ventilago denticulata is a species of tree with a wide distribution in East, Southeast, and South Asia, and including in Indo-China, China (Guangxi, Guizhou, and Yunnan), and most of India.
