= Cyperus nutans =

Scientific classification
- Kingdom: Plantae
- Clade: Tracheophytes
- Clade: Angiosperms
- Clade: Monocots
- Clade: Commelinids
- Order: Poales
- Family: Cyperaceae
- Genus: Cyperus
- Species: C. nutans

Binomial name
- Cyperus nutans Vahl

Synonyms
- Cyperus bispicatus Steud. Cyperus racemosus Retz.

Species of plant

Cyperus nutans is a sedge of the family Cyperaceae that is native to Australia, China, India, Bangladesh, south-east Asia, Malaysia, India, and Indonesia.

The rhizomatous perennial sedge typically grows to a height of 1.5 metres (4.9 ft). The culms are three sided with sharp edges and concave sides. The culms are typically up 100 cm (39 in) in length and have a diameter of 10 mm (0.39 in). The leaves are usually shorter than the culms and have a width of around 6 to 12 mm (0.24 to 0.47 in). It blooms between February and July and produces brown flowers. Each compound inflorescence has six to ten primary branches up to a length of 30 cm (12 in). The narrow-cylindrical spikes have a length of 2 to 3 cm (0.79 to 1.18 in) with a 5 mm (0.20 in) diameter. After flowering a dark brown narrow-ellipsoid to narrow-obovoid shaped nut will form.

The species was first formally described by the botanist Martin Vahl in 1805 as part of the work Enumeratio Plantarum, from a specimen collected in India. The only two subspecies are Cyperus nutans subsp. nutans and Cyperus nutans var. nutans.

The plant is found in northern and eastern Australia in coastal areas in the states of New South Wales, Queensland, Northern Territory and Western Australia. In Western Australia it is found around shady swamps and pools in the Kimberley region where it grows in sandy-clay soils. In New South Wales it is only found in the north-eastern corner where it is found along creek banks.

== See also ==
- List of Cyperus species
