= Cyperus sulcinux =

Conservation status
- Priority One — Poorly Known Taxa (DEC)

Scientific classification
- Kingdom: Plantae
- Clade: Tracheophytes
- Clade: Angiosperms
- Clade: Monocots
- Clade: Commelinids
- Order: Poales
- Family: Cyperaceae
- Genus: Cyperus
- Species: C. sulcinux

Binomial name
- Cyperus sulcinux C.B.Clarke

Species of plant

Cyperus sulcinux is a sedge of the family Cyperaceae that is native to Australia.

The annual herbaceous or grass-like sedge typically grows to a height of 0.05 to 0.4 metres (0.16 to 1.31 ft) and has a tufted habit. In Western Australia it is found around seepages in a small area to the north of the Kimberley region where it grows in sandy soils over sandstone.

== See also ==
- List of Cyperus species
