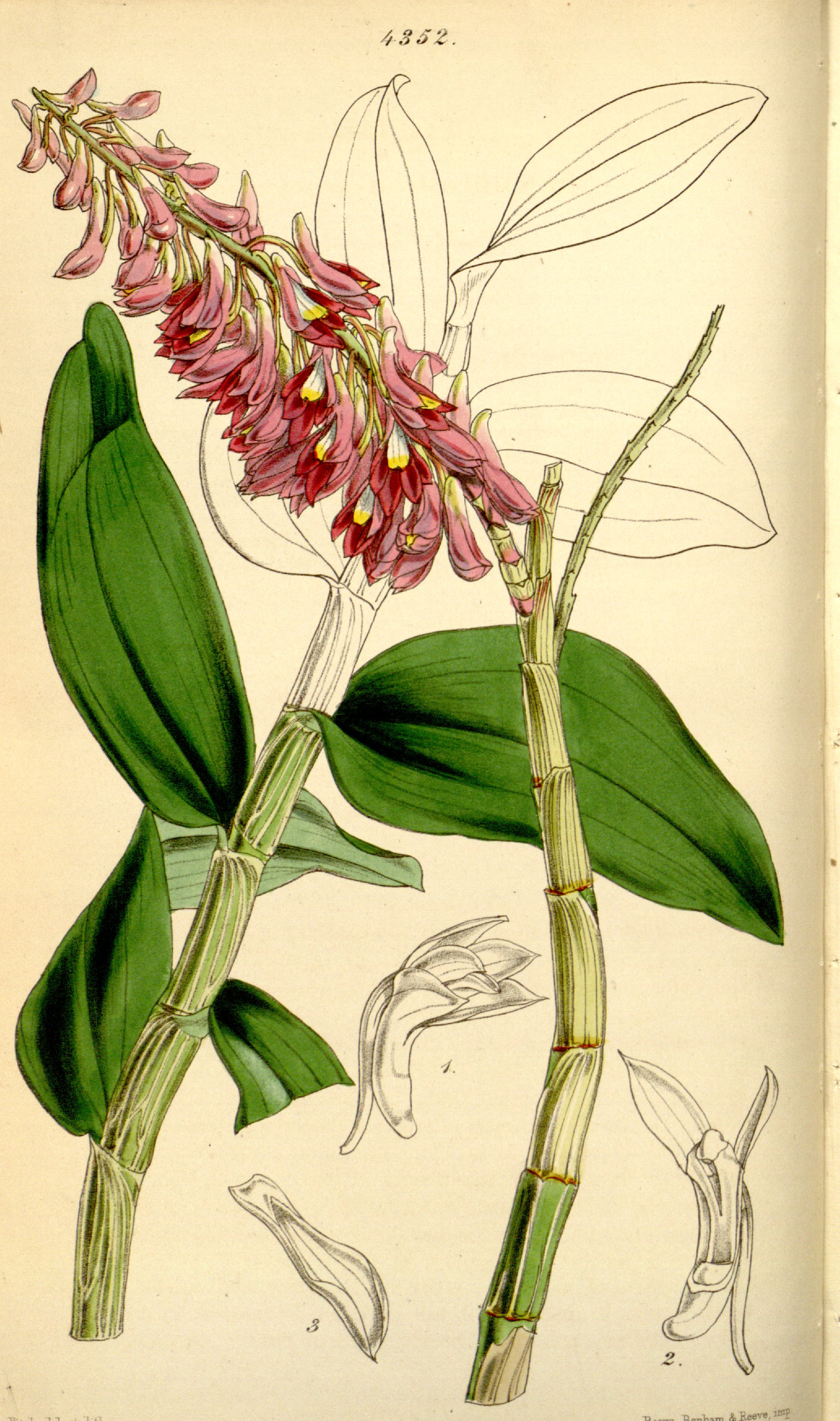
- 1847 illustration

Scientific classification
- Kingdom: Plantae
- Clade: Tracheophytes
- Clade: Angiosperms
- Clade: Monocots
- Order: Asparagales
- Family: Orchidaceae
- Subfamily: Epidendroideae
- Genus: Dendrobium
- Species: D. secundum

Binomial name
- Dendrobium secundum (Blume) Lindl.

Synonyms
- Pedilonum secundum Blume; Dendrobium bursigerum Lindl.; Dendrobium heterostigma Rchb.f.; Dendrobium secundum var. niveum Rchb.f.; Callista bursigera (Lindl.) Kuntze; Callista secunda (Blume) Kuntze; Dendrobium secundum f. album Valmayor & D. Tiu; Pedilonum bursigerum (Lindl.) Rauschert

= Dendrobium secundum =

Toothbrush orchid

Species of orchid

Dendrobium secundum, also known as the toothbrush orchid, is a species of flowering plant in the genus Dendrobium of the family Orchidaceae. The common name refers to the fact that all the flowers are on the same side of the stem, much like the bristles all on one side of a toothbrush.

Dendrobium secundum is a pseudobulb epiphyte. It lives in diverse habitats throughout Southeast Asia, including Andaman & Nicobar Islands, Thailand, Philippines, Peninsular Malaysia, Java, Borneo, Sumatra, Sulawesi, Indo-China and Lesser Sunda Islands.
