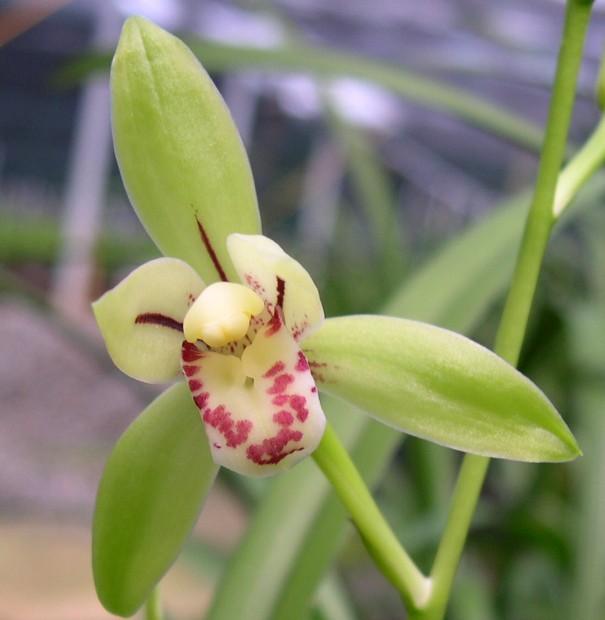

Scientific classification
- Kingdom: Plantae
- Clade: Tracheophytes
- Clade: Angiosperms
- Clade: Monocots
- Order: Asparagales
- Family: Orchidaceae
- Subfamily: Epidendroideae
- Genus: Cymbidium
- Species: C. ensifolium

Binomial name
- Cymbidium ensifolium (L.) Sw.

Subspecies
- Cymbidium ensifolium ssp. ensifolium - Mt. Tu-Wu Fall Orchid; Cymbidium ensifolium ssp. haematodes

Synonyms
- Epidendrum ensifolium L. (1753) (Basionym); Jensoa ensata Raf. (1838)

= Cymbidium ensifolium =

Four-season orchid

Species of orchid

Cymbidium ensifolium, the four-season orchid, is a species of orchid, also known as the golden-thread orchid, spring orchid, burned-apex orchid and rock orchid. It has a number of different cultivars of interest to orchid collectors. The genome of this species has been sequenced in 2021.
