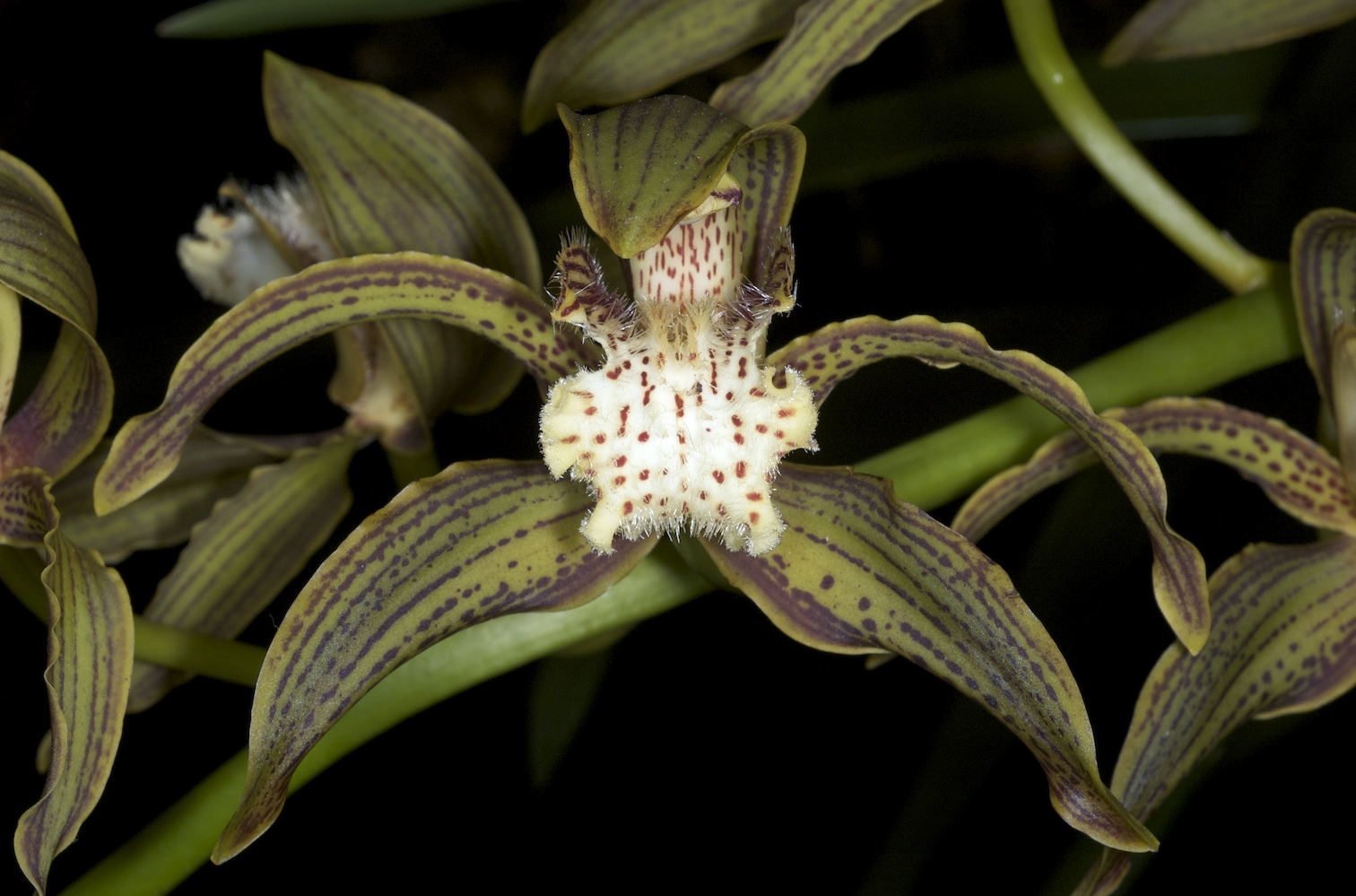

Scientific classification
- Kingdom: Plantae
- Clade: Tracheophytes
- Clade: Angiosperms
- Clade: Monocots
- Order: Asparagales
- Family: Orchidaceae
- Subfamily: Epidendroideae
- Genus: Cymbidium
- Species: C. tracyanum

Binomial name
- Cymbidium tracyanum L.Castle

Synonyms
- Cyperorchis tracyana (L.Castle) Schltr.

= Cymbidium tracyanum =

Tracy's cymbidium

Species of orchid

Cymbidium tracyanum is a species of orchid. It flowers in the fall and winter with large, fragrant 4" flowers. This is a large sized, cold to cool growing plant that can withstand near-freezing temperatures.
