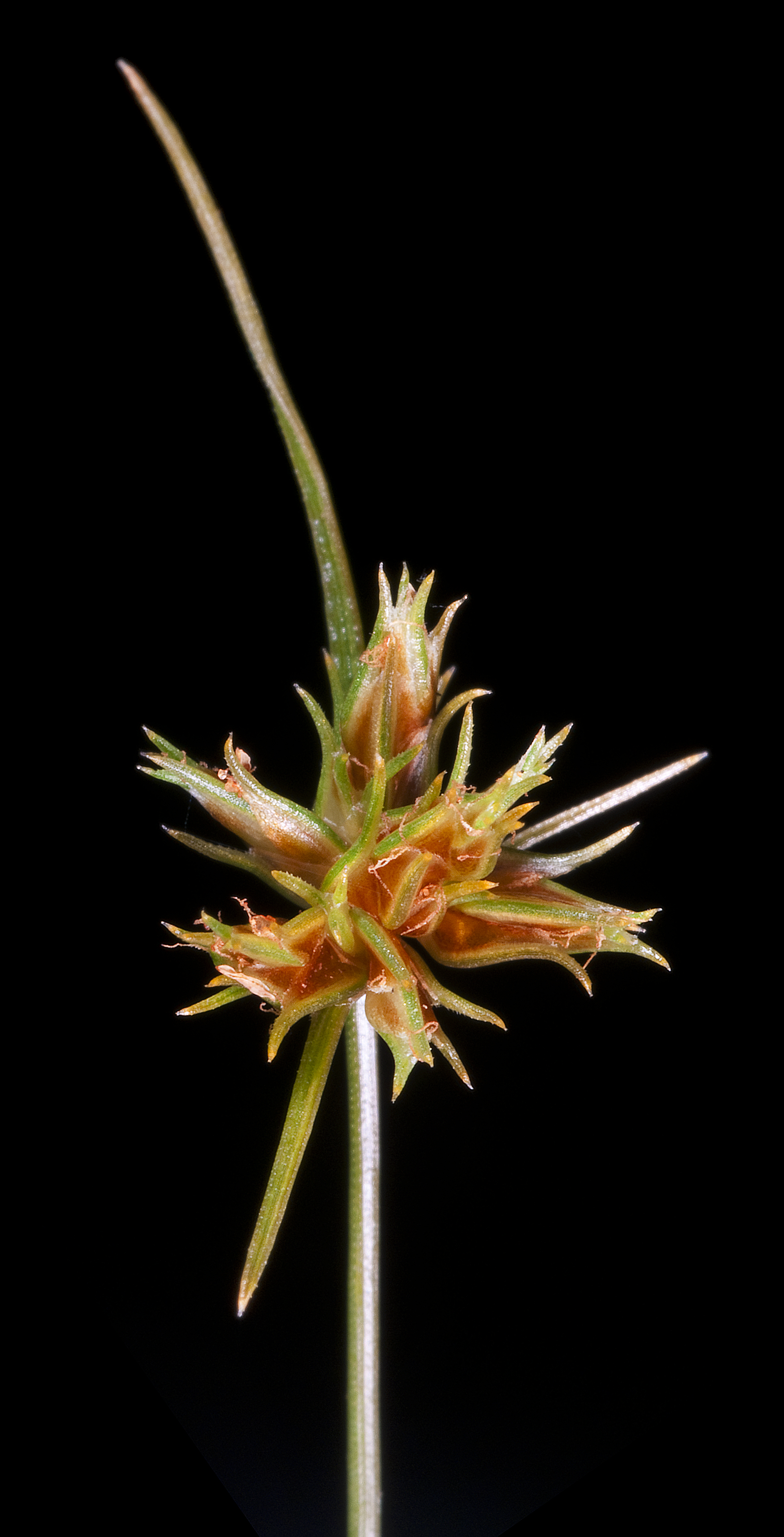

Scientific classification
- Kingdom: Plantae
- Clade: Tracheophytes
- Clade: Angiosperms
- Clade: Monocots
- Clade: Commelinids
- Order: Poales
- Family: Cyperaceae
- Genus: Bulbostylis
- Species: B. barbata

Binomial name
- Bulbostylis barbata (Rottb.) C.B.Clarke

= Bulbostylis barbata =

Species of grass-like plant

Bulbostylis barbata is a flowering plant in the sedge family, Cyperaceae, that is native to Western Australia.

The annual grass-like plant has a tufted habit and typically grows to a height of 2 to 35 centimetres (1 to 14 in). It blooms between February and September, producing brown flowers.

It is rarely solitary and is found in rock crevices and along creek and rivers and on low-lying flats throughout a large area of the Kimberley, Pilbara, Mid West and Goldfields-Esperance regions, where it grows in sandy-loamy alluvium over sandstone and granite.
