= Cyperus elatus =

Scientific classification
- Kingdom: Plantae
- Clade: Tracheophytes
- Clade: Angiosperms
- Clade: Monocots
- Clade: Commelinids
- Order: Poales
- Family: Cyperaceae
- Genus: Cyperus
- Species: C. elatus

Binomial name
- Cyperus elatus L.

Synonyms
- Cyperus bispicatus Steud. Cyperus racemosus Retz.

Species of plant of in the sedge family

Cyperus elatus is a species of Cyperus in the sedge family, Cyperaceae, which is found from China to tropical Asia, and to Indonesia.

The species was first described by Carl Linnaeus in 1756.
