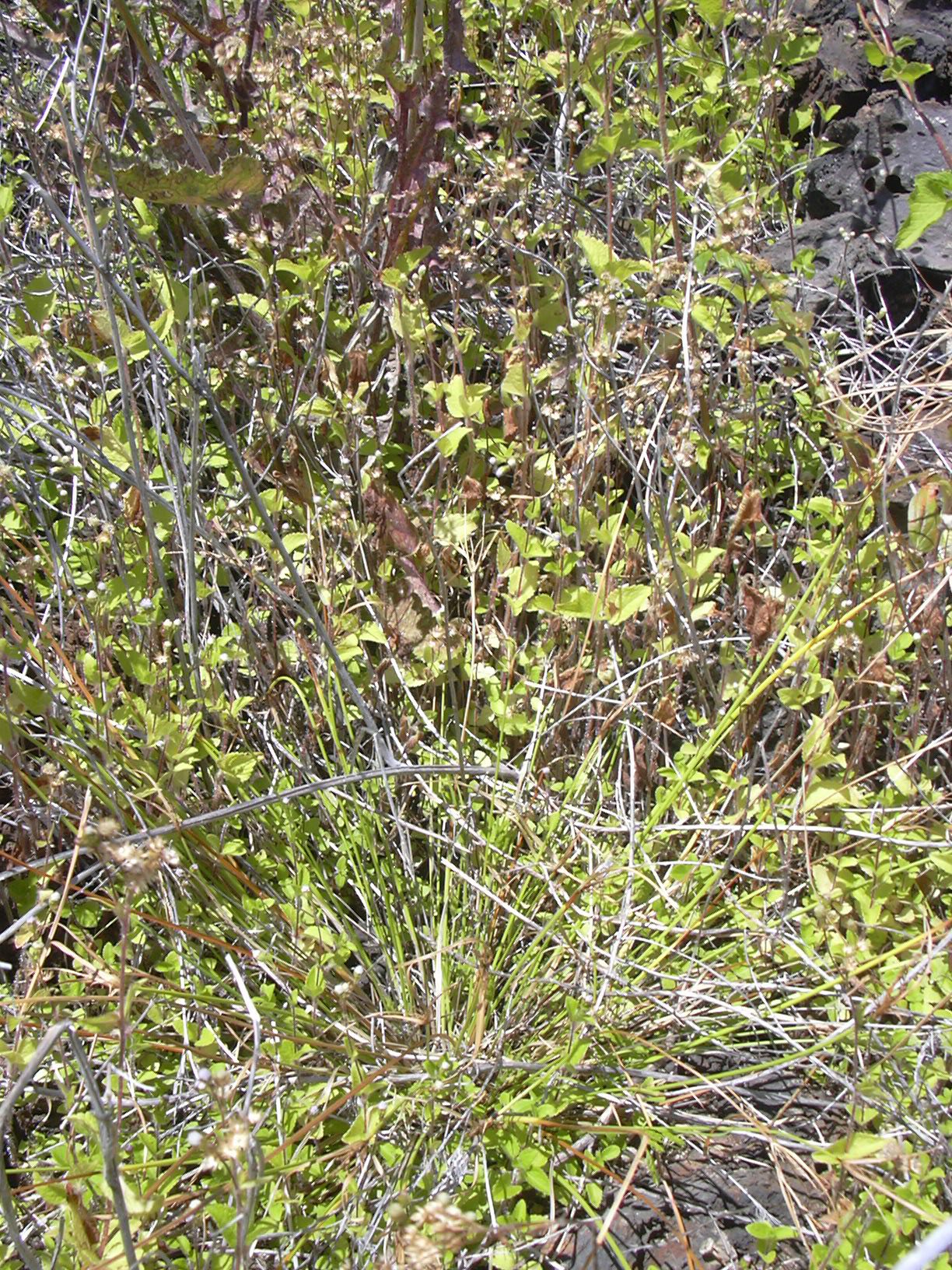

Scientific classification
- Kingdom: Plantae
- Clade: Tracheophytes
- Clade: Angiosperms
- Clade: Monocots
- Clade: Commelinids
- Order: Poales
- Family: Cyperaceae
- Genus: Cyperus
- Species: C. cyperinus

Binomial name
- Cyperus cyperinus (Retz.) Valck.Sur.

= Cyperus cyperinus =

Species of sedge

Cyperus cyperinus is a species of sedge that is native to parts of Asia and Oceania. It is commonly known as the umbrella sedge. It is characterized by its distinctive umbrella-like inflorescence and is often found in wetland habitats.

== See also ==
- List of Cyperus species
