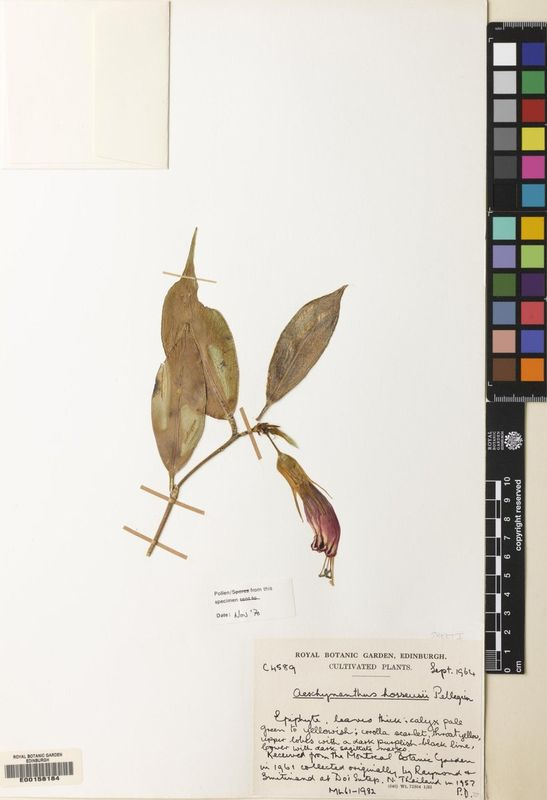

Scientific classification
- Kingdom: Plantae
- Clade: Embryophytes
- Clade: Tracheophytes
- Clade: Spermatophytes
- Clade: Angiosperms
- Clade: Eudicots
- Clade: Asterids
- Order: Lamiales
- Family: Gesneriaceae
- Genus: Aeschynanthus
- Species: A. hosseusii

Binomial name
- Aeschynanthus hosseusii Pellegr.

Synonyms
- Aeschynanthus macrocalyx Hosseus

= Aeschynanthus hosseusii =

Species of flowering plant

Aeschynanthus hosseusii is a species of flowering plant in the family Gesneriaceae. It is an epiphyte native to Thailand and Vietnam. The species was described in 1926.

== Taxonomy ==
The species was described by François Pellegrin in 1926.

== Distribution ==
Aeschynanthus hosseusii is native to the wet tropical biome of Thailand and Vietnam.

== Description ==
Aeschynanthus hosseusii is an epiphytic subshrub.
