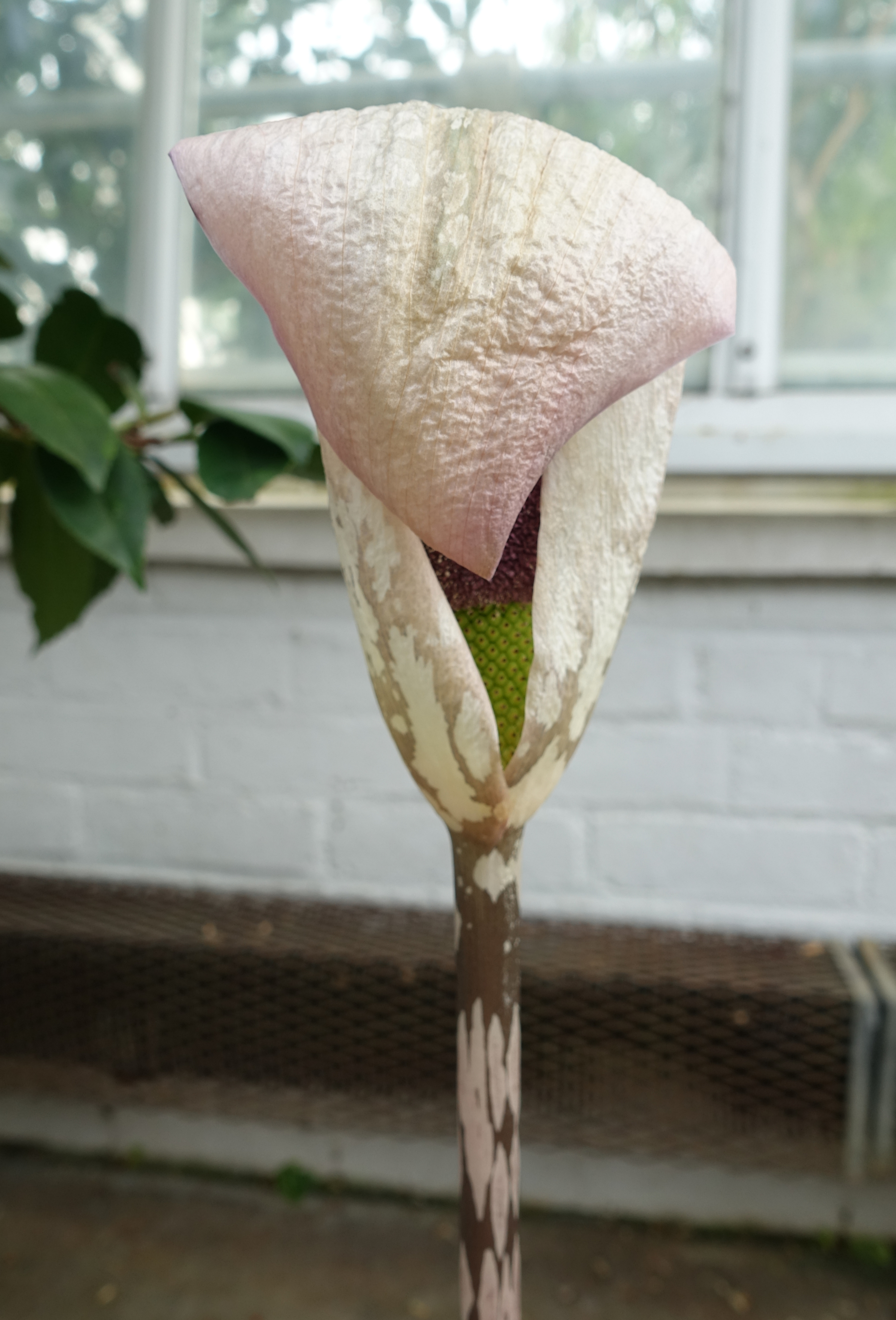

Scientific classification
- Kingdom: Plantae
- Clade: Tracheophytes
- Clade: Angiosperms
- Clade: Monocots
- Order: Alismatales
- Family: Araceae
- Genus: Amorphophallus
- Species: A. yunnanensis

Binomial name
- Amorphophallus yunnanensis Engl.

Synonyms
- Amorphophallus kerrii N.E.Br.; Thomsonia thaiensis S.Y.Hu

= Amorphophallus yunnanensis =

Species of flowering plant

Amorphophallus yunnanensis (滇蘑芋, dian mo yu) is a flowering plant species native to forests and thickets, at altitudes of 100–3300 meters, in Guangxi, Guizhou, and Yunnan provinces in China, as well as Laos, and northern Thailand and Vietnam.

Its tuber is dark brown, up to 13 cm in diameter, and weigh up to 500 grams. The leaf is solitary, 6–35 cm, grayish green, covered with pale pinkish spots. The inflorescence is solitary, 13–60 cm in height and 1–2 cm in diameter at its base. Berries are initially green, then turning blue and finally violet.
