= Cyperus compactus =

Scientific classification
- Kingdom: Plantae
- Clade: Tracheophytes
- Clade: Angiosperms
- Clade: Monocots
- Clade: Commelinids
- Order: Poales
- Family: Cyperaceae
- Genus: Cyperus
- Species: C. compactus

Binomial name
- Cyperus compactus Retz.

Species of plant endemic to Australia

Cyperus compactus is a sedge of the family Cyperaceae that is native to the South East Asia, Madagascar and northern Australia.

In Australia it is found in the Kimberley region of Western Australia as well as parts of the Northern Territory and Queensland.

== See also ==
- List of Cyperus species
