= Polygonum barbatum =

Polygonum barbatum is a botanical synonym of four species of plant:

- Persicaria acuminata, synonym published in 1818 by Georg Friedrich Wilhelm Meyer
- Persicaria barbata, synonym published in 1753 by Carl Linnaeus
- Persicaria lapathifolia, synonym published in 1794 by Carl Peter Thunberg
- Persicaria pubescens, synonym published in 1832 by William Roxburgh
