= Carex phacota =

Conservation status
- Least Concern (IUCN 3.1)

Scientific classification
- Kingdom: Plantae
- Clade: Tracheophytes
- Clade: Angiosperms
- Clade: Monocots
- Clade: Commelinids
- Order: Poales
- Family: Cyperaceae
- Genus: Carex
- Species: C. phacota

Binomial name
- Carex phacota Spreng.

Synonyms
- List: Carex biconvexis D.Don; Carex cincta Franch.; Carex fauriei Franch.; Carex gracilipes Miq.; Carex lenticularis D.Don; Carex lepidopristis H.Lév. & Vaniot; Carex phacota var. cincta (Franch.) Ohwi; Carex phacota var. gracilispica Kük.; Carex phacota var. shichiseitensis Ohwi; Carex phacota var. subphacota Kük.; Carex platycarpa Hochst. ex Steud.; Carex pruinosa var. aristata Kuntze; Carex shichiseitensis Hayata; Carex subphacota (Kük.) Nakai; Carex subphacota var. glauca Honda

Species of plant

Carex phacota, the lentoid sedge, (Note: Some sources erroneously call it the "lakeshore sedge", presumably because of its synonym Carex lenticularis D.Don; it is Carex lenticularis Michx., a North American species, which has that common name.) is a species of flowering plant in the family Cyperaceae. It is native to parts of the Indian Subcontinent, Southeast Asia, most of Malesia, New Guinea, central and southern China, Hainan, Taiwan, Korea, the Ryukyus, and Japan. A pioneer species adapted to disturbances such as fire and landslides, it is typically found in wet grasslands, ditches, the banks of streams, and the sides of roads, and is categorized by the IUCN as Least Concern.
