= Solanum verbascifolium =

Solanum verbascifolium may refer to:

- Solanum verbascifolium L., nom. utique rejic., a synonym of Solanum donianum Walp.
- Solanum verbascifolium Kunth, nom. illeg., a synonym of Solanum bicolor Willd.
- Solanum verbascifolium Banks ex Dunal, a synonym of Solanum donianum Walp.
