= Ivory (color) =

Off-white color

Color coordinates
- Hex triplet: #FFFFF0
- sRGB^{B} (r, g, b): (255, 255, 240)
- HSV (h, s, v): (60°, 6%, 100%)
- CIELCh_{uv} (L, C, h): (100, 0, 0°)
- Source: X11
- ISCC–NBS descriptor: Pale yellow
- B: Normalized to [0–255] (byte)

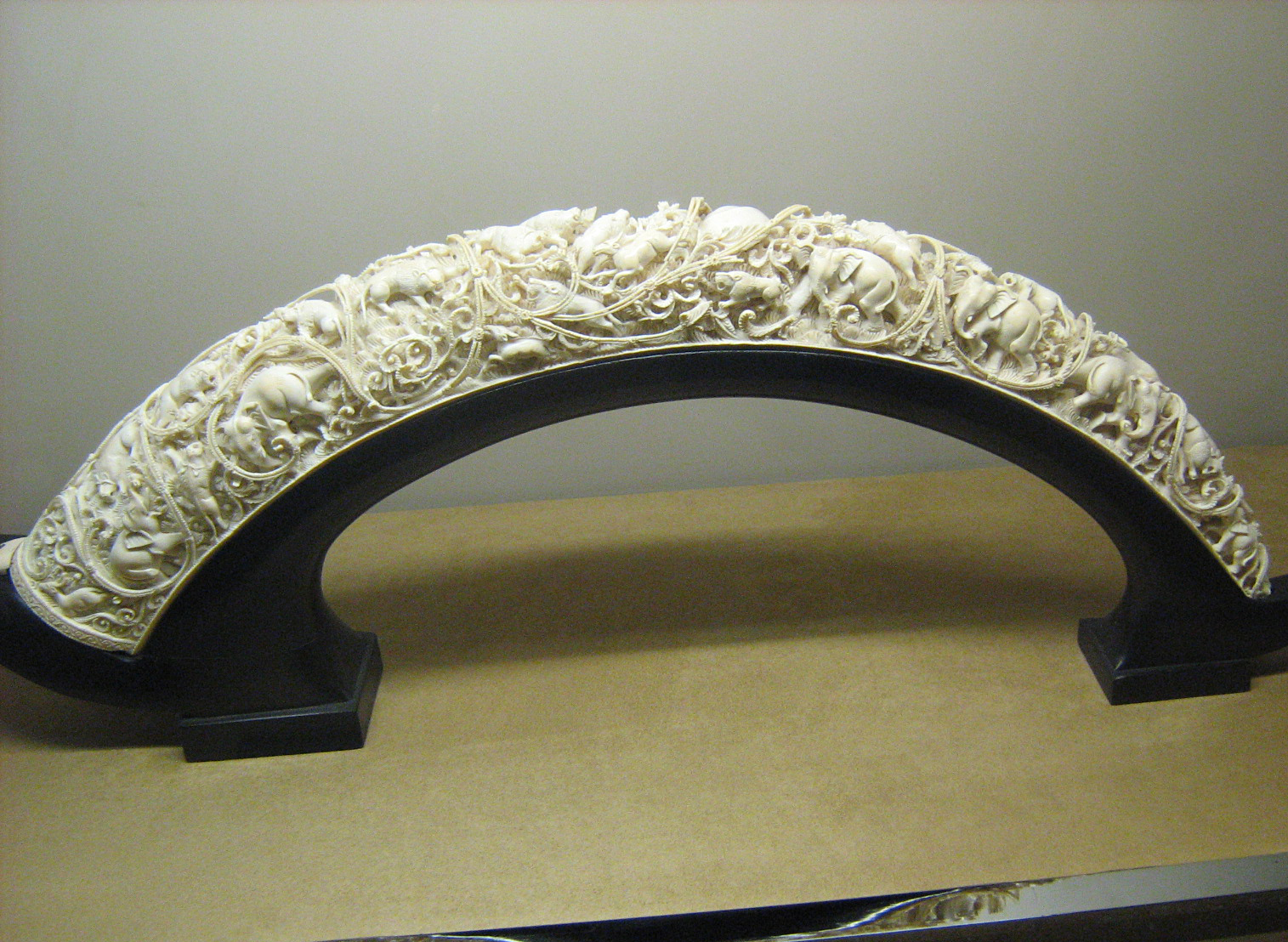
Carved ivory in Sa'dabad Palace, Iran

Ivory is an off-white color named after, and derived from, the material made from the tusks and teeth of certain animals, such as the elephant and the walrus. It has a very slight tint of yellow.

The color is often associated with purity and elegance. In Western culture, it is also associated with weddings and other formal occasions. In Eastern cultures, ivory has been used for centuries in the creation of decorative objects and religious artifacts, such as Buddha statues and other sculptures. The cultural acceptance of the use of ivory as a material has declined over time, with the practice being outlawed in much of the world.

The first recorded use of ivory as a color name in English was in 1385.

The color "ivory" was included as one of the X11 colors when they were formulated in 1987.

== Ivory in nature ==
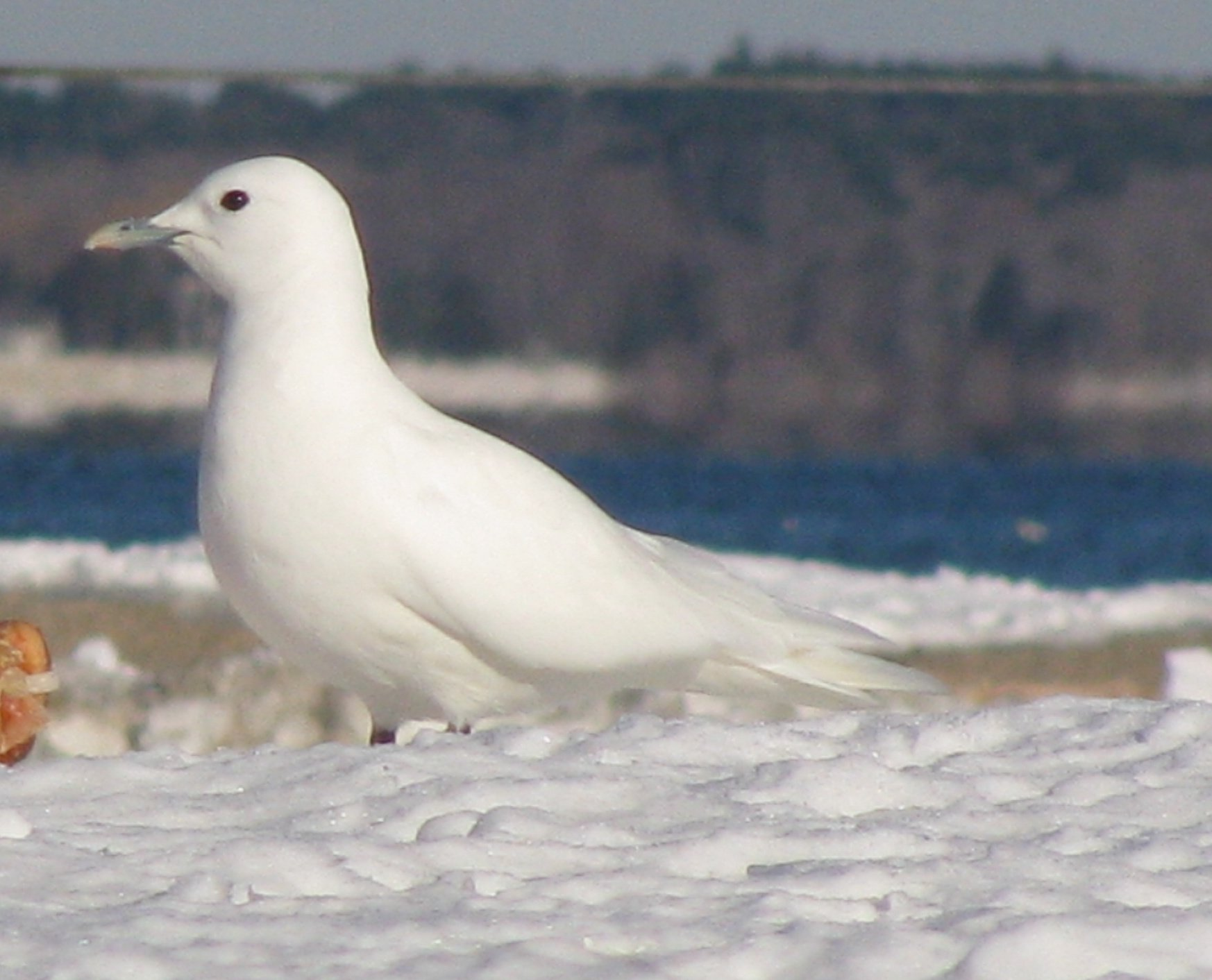
Ivory gull

Plants

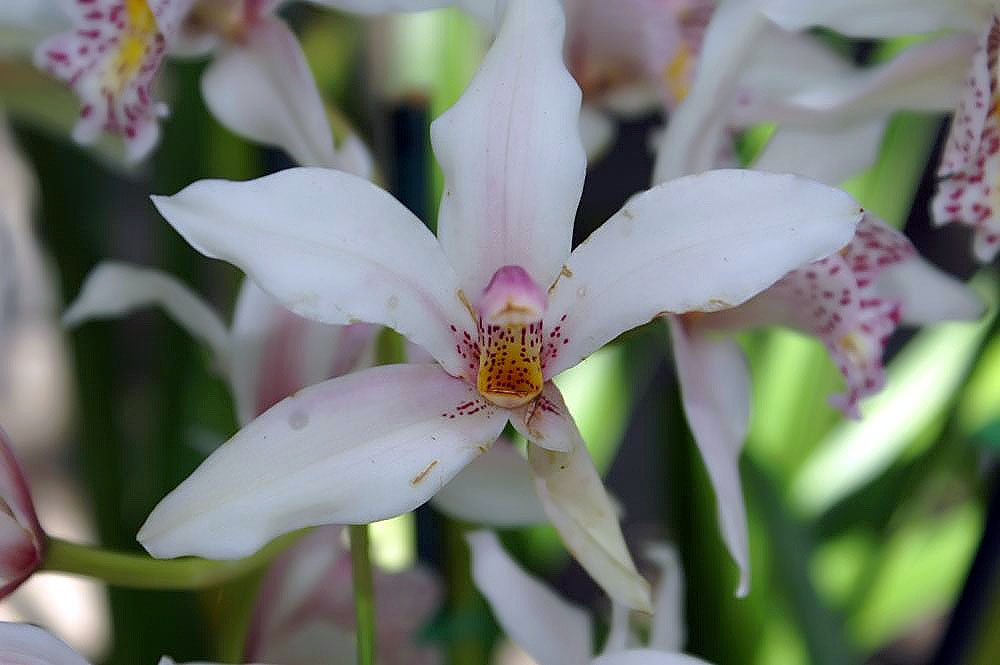
- Ivory-colored Cymbidium orchid
  The ivory-colored cymbidium is a species of orchid.

Birds

- Ivory is used adjectivally in the names of several birds to describe their appearance, including the ivory gull, ivory-backed woodswallow, ivory-billed aracari, ivory-billed woodcreeper, ivory-billed woodpecker and ivory-breasted pitta.

== See also ==
- RAL 1014 Ivory
- List of colors
- X11 color names
