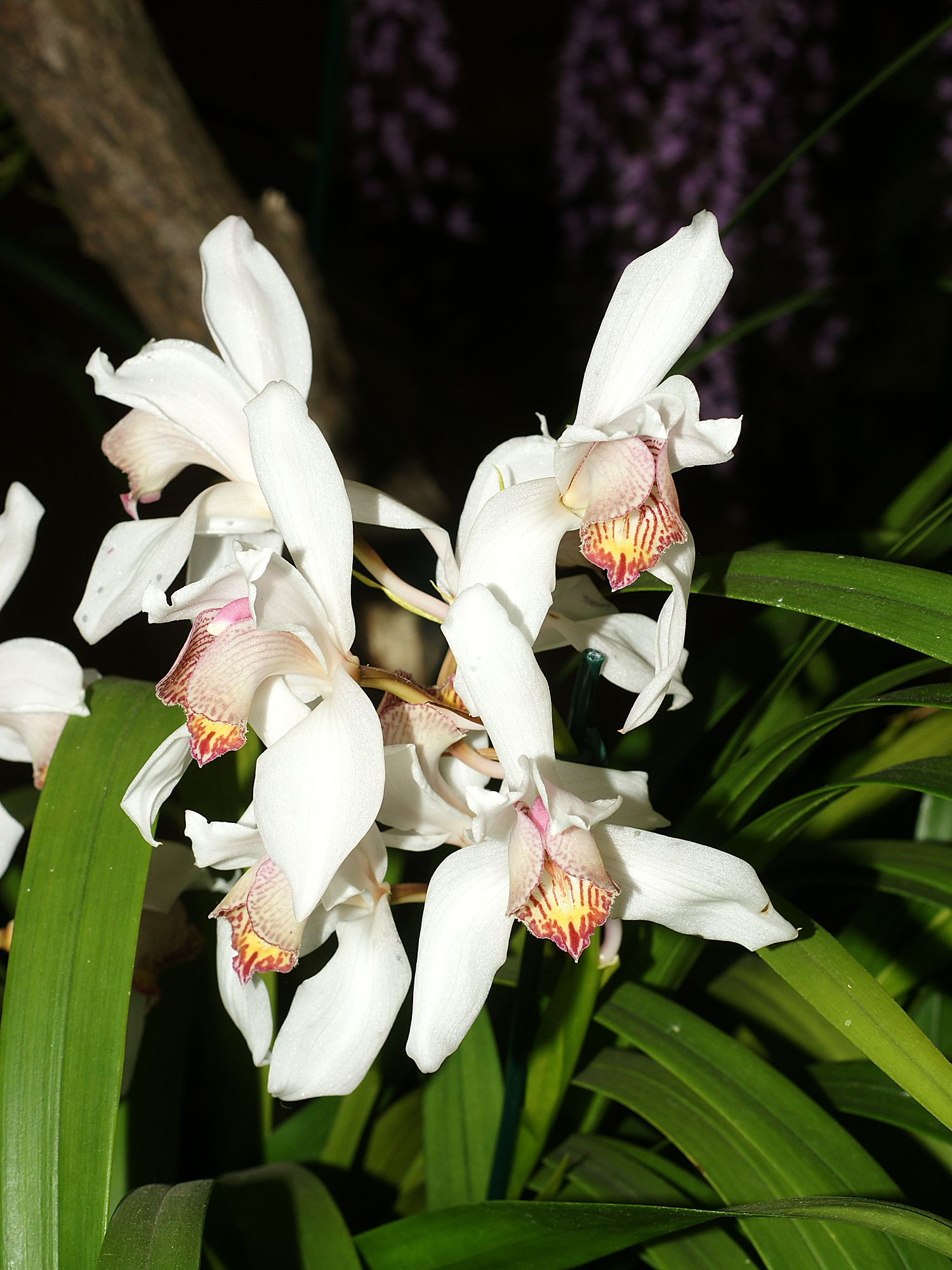

Scientific classification
- Kingdom: Plantae
- Clade: Tracheophytes
- Clade: Angiosperms
- Clade: Monocots
- Order: Asparagales
- Family: Orchidaceae
- Subfamily: Epidendroideae
- Genus: Cymbidium
- Species: C. erythrostylum

Binomial name
- Cymbidium erythrostylum Rolfe (1905)

Synonyms
- Cyperorchis erythrostyla (Rolfe) Schltr. (1924)

= Cymbidium erythrostylum =

Red column cymbidium

Species of orchid

Cymbidium erythrostylum, the red column cymbidium, is a species of orchid.
