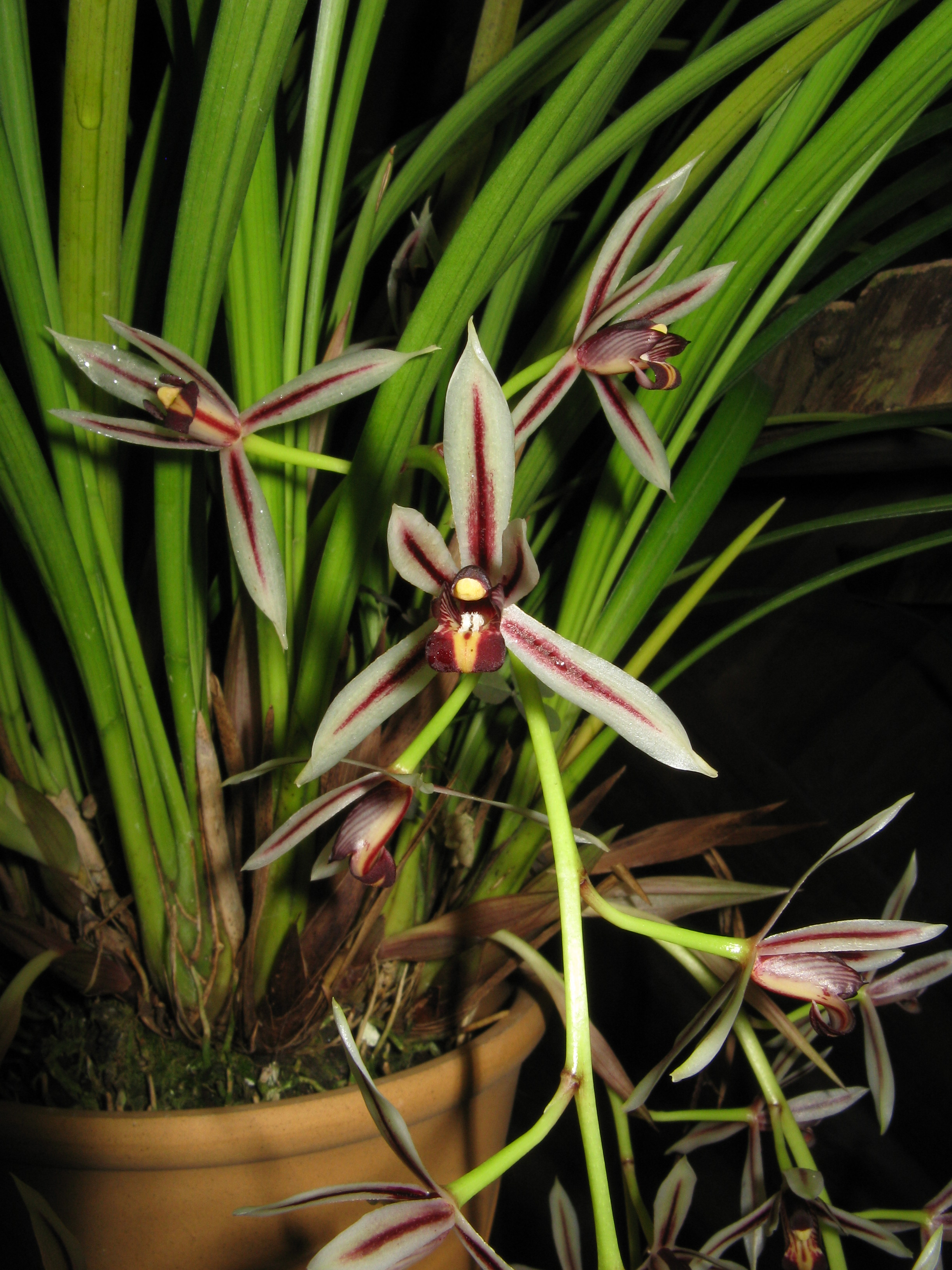

Scientific classification
- Kingdom: Plantae
- Clade: Tracheophytes
- Clade: Angiosperms
- Clade: Monocots
- Order: Asparagales
- Family: Orchidaceae
- Subfamily: Epidendroideae
- Genus: Cymbidium
- Species: C. dayanum

Binomial name
- Cymbidium dayanum Rchb.f. (1869)

Synonyms
- Cymbidium leachianum Rchb.f. (1878); Cymbidium pulcherrimum Sander (1891); Cymbidium simonsianum King & Pantl. (1895); Cymbidium acutum Ridl. (1896); Cymbidium alborubens Makino (1902); Cymbidium simonsianum f. vernale Makino (1912); Cymbidium angustifolium Ames & C. Schweinf. (1920); Cymbidium sutepense Rolfe ex Downie (1925); Cymbidium poilanei Gagnep. (1931); Cymbidium dayanum var. austrojaponicum Tuyama (1941); Cymbidium eburneum var. austrojaponicum (Tuyama) M.Hiroe (1971); Cymbidium dayanum subsp. leachianum (Rchb.f.) S.S. Ying (1989)

= Cymbidium dayanum =

Day's cymbidium

Species of orchid

Cymbidium dayanum, the tree orchid, is a species of orchid that is widespread in Southeast Asia.
