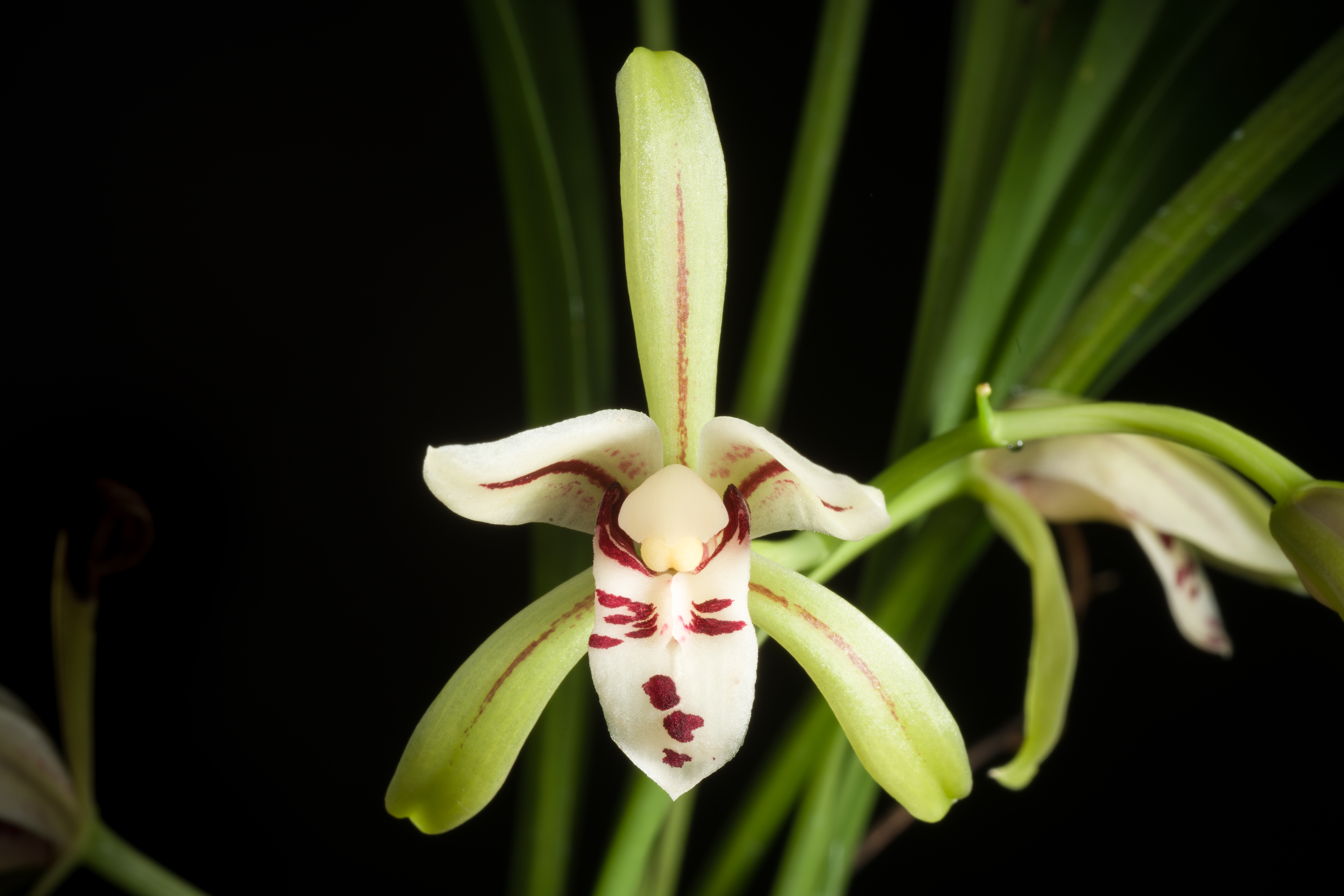

Scientific classification
- Kingdom: Plantae
- Clade: Tracheophytes
- Clade: Angiosperms
- Clade: Monocots
- Order: Asparagales
- Family: Orchidaceae
- Subfamily: Epidendroideae
- Genus: Cymbidium
- Species: C. lancifolium

Binomial name
- Cymbidium lancifolium Hook.

= Cymbidium lancifolium =

Species of plant in the family Orchidaceae

Cymbidium lancifolium is a species of flowering plant in the family Orchidaceae. It is native to tropical and subtropical Asia.
