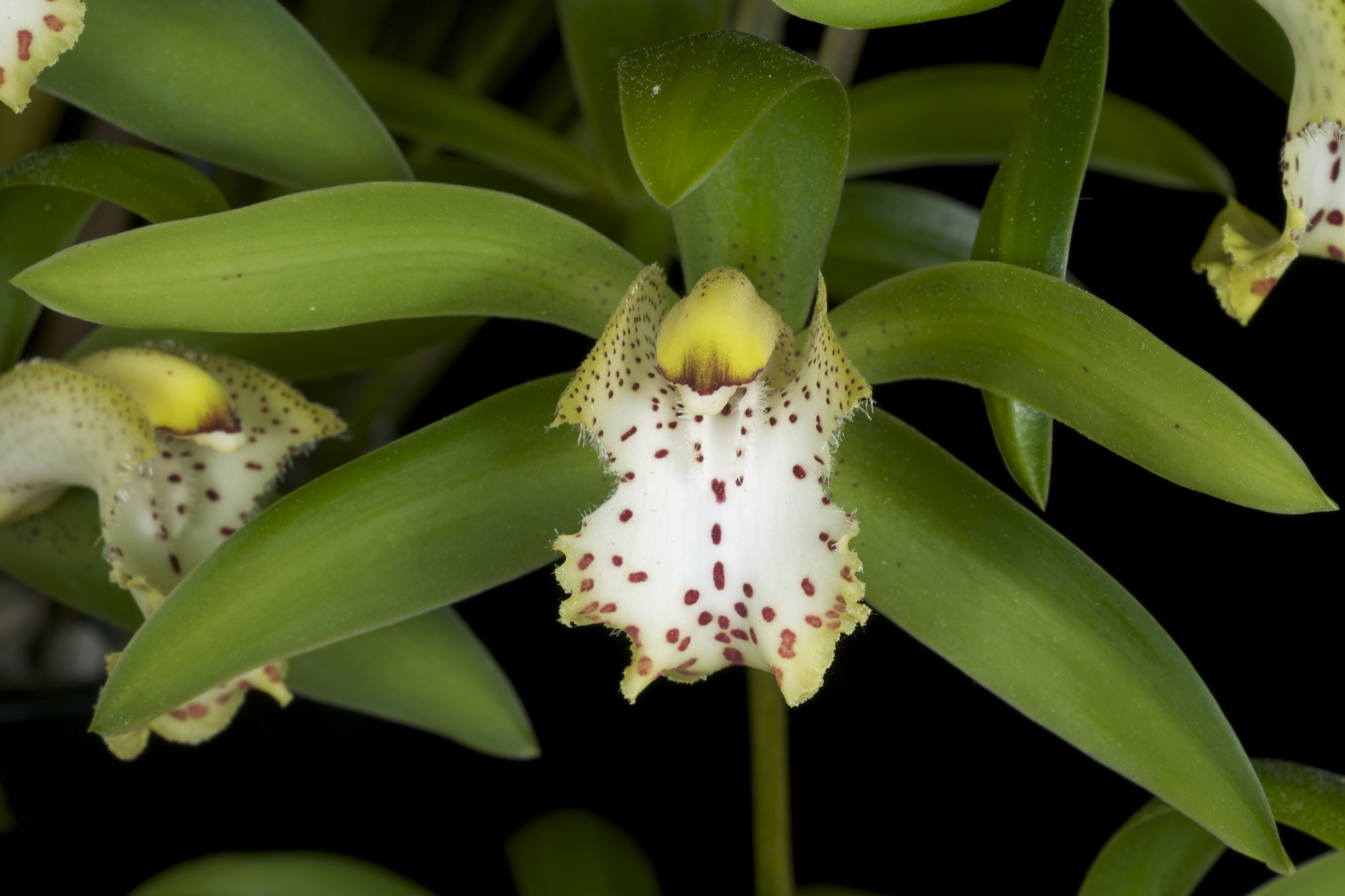

Scientific classification
- Kingdom: Plantae
- Clade: Tracheophytes
- Clade: Angiosperms
- Clade: Monocots
- Order: Asparagales
- Family: Orchidaceae
- Subfamily: Epidendroideae
- Genus: Cymbidium
- Species: C. hookerianum

Binomial name
- Cymbidium hookerianum Rchb.f. (1866)

Synonyms
- Cymbidium grandiflorum Griff. (1851); Cyperorchis grandiflora Schltr. (1924)

= Cymbidium hookerianum =

Species of orchid

Cymbidium hookerianum (common name Hooker's Cymbidium) is a species of orchid found in India, China, and Vietnam. It is distributed widely in Bhutan, especially in the cool temperate forests.

== Description ==
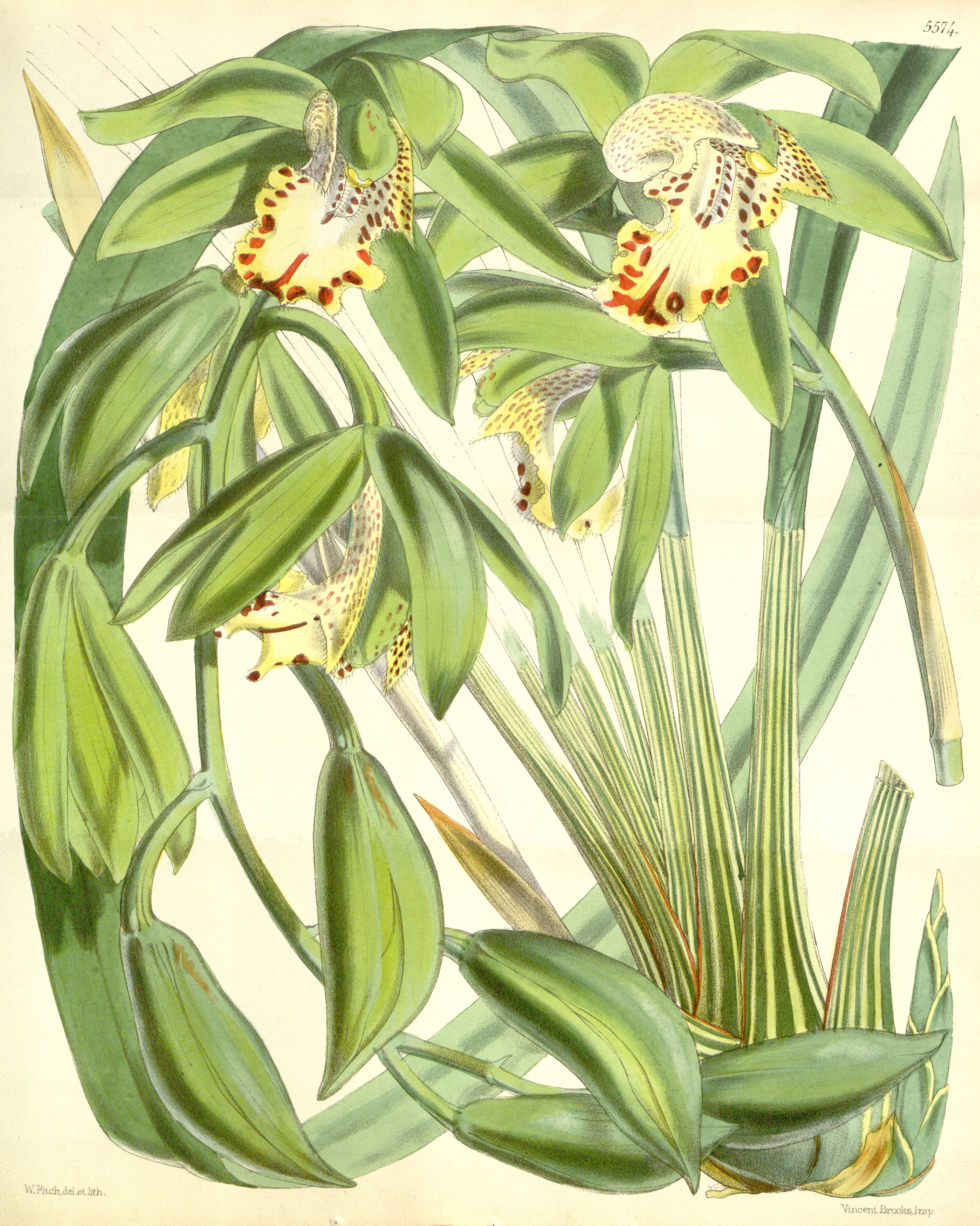
Illustration of Cymbidium hookerianum

Cymbidium hookerianum is a species of medium to large size orchid, which prefers cold weather. It is epiphytic with an ovoid pseudobulb, elongated with ligulate, acuminate, and articulated leaves. It blooms in a solid inflorescence, sheathed at the base, hanging and arched, 75 cm long, apical with triangular floral bracts and bearing 6 to 15 flowers, 14 cm long. It has a very fragrant and long-lasting odor. Flowering occurs in late winter and spring.

== Distribution and habitat ==
It is distributed throughout Nepal, Bhutan, and Sikkim on steep river banks in dense and humid forests or oak forests, always at heights of 1600 to 2400 meters.

== Taxonomy ==
Cymbidium hookerianum was described by Heinrich Gustav Reichenbach and published in The Gardeners' Chronicle & Agricultural Gazette in 1866.

=== Etymology ===
Cymbidium: The name derives from the Greek word kumbos, which means "hole, cavity". This refers to the shape of the base of the lip. According to other scholars it derives from the Greek kimbe, which means boat, for the shape of the ship that the lip assumes.

The species name hookerianum was chosen in honor of botanist Joseph Dalton Hooker, "an excellent name too, given with the writer's best wishes as a gratulation for the first new year's day of his Kew directorship, to Dr. Hooker."

=== Synonyms ===
- Cymbidium grandiflorum Griff. (1851)
- Cyperorchis grandiflora (Sw.) Schltr. 1924
