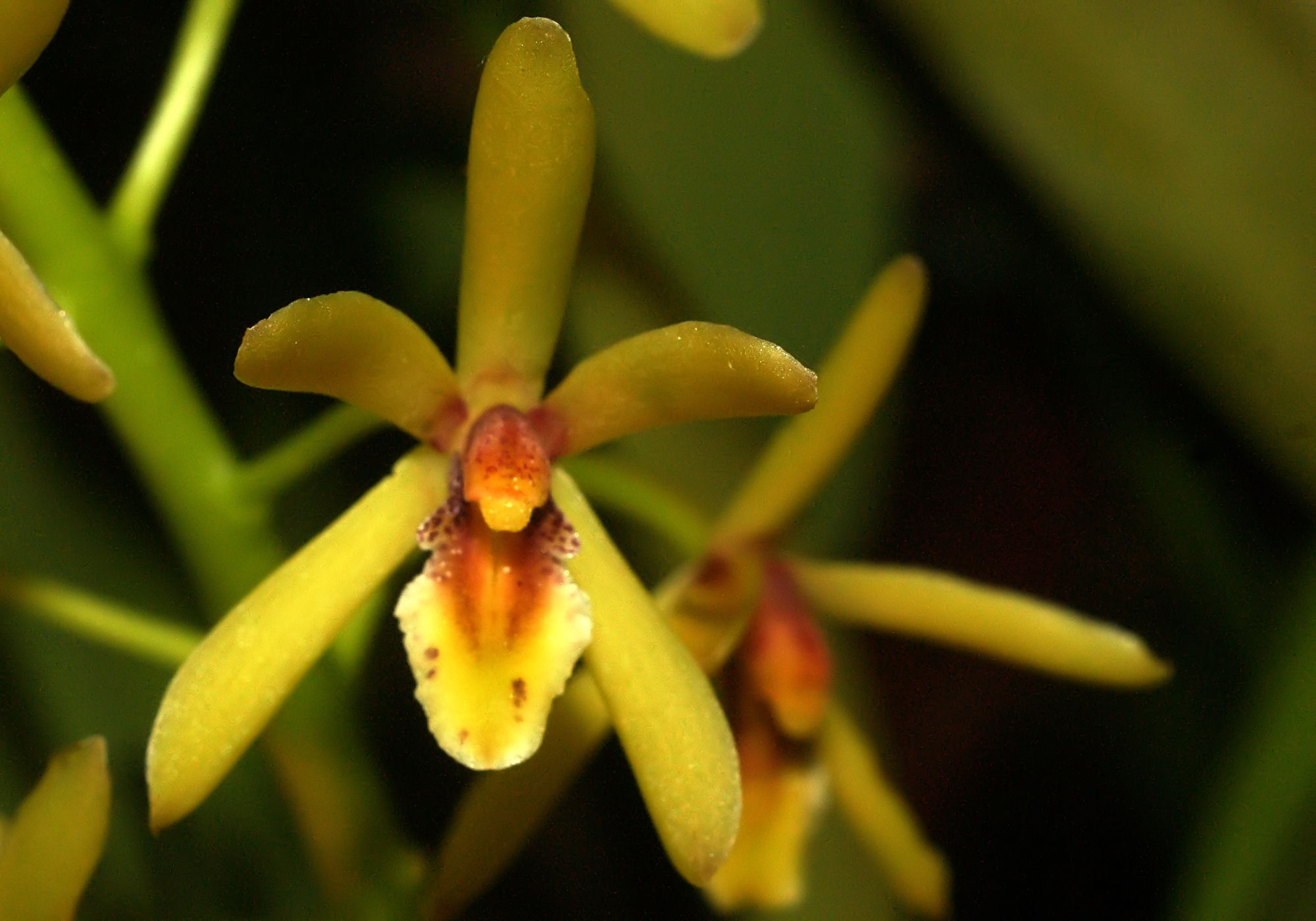
- Cymbidium suave flower

Scientific classification
- Kingdom: Plantae
- Clade: Tracheophytes
- Clade: Angiosperms
- Clade: Monocots
- Order: Asparagales
- Family: Orchidaceae
- Subfamily: Epidendroideae
- Genus: Cymbidium
- Species: C. suave

Binomial name
- Cymbidium suave R.Br.

Synonyms
- Cymbidium gomphocarpum Fitzg.

= Cymbidium suave =

Snake orchid

Species of orchid

Cymbidium suave, commonly known as snake orchid or grassy boat-lip orchid, is a plant in the orchid family and is endemic to eastern Australia. It is an epiphytic orchid that forms long-lasting clumps of grass-like leaves. Up to fifty crowded olive green to dark or brownish green flowers are borne on an arching flowering stem. Of the three Australian species of Cymbidium, this is the only one that does not have prominent pseudobulbs. It is found in eastern Australia, usually growing in the hollows of old or fallen, decaying trees.

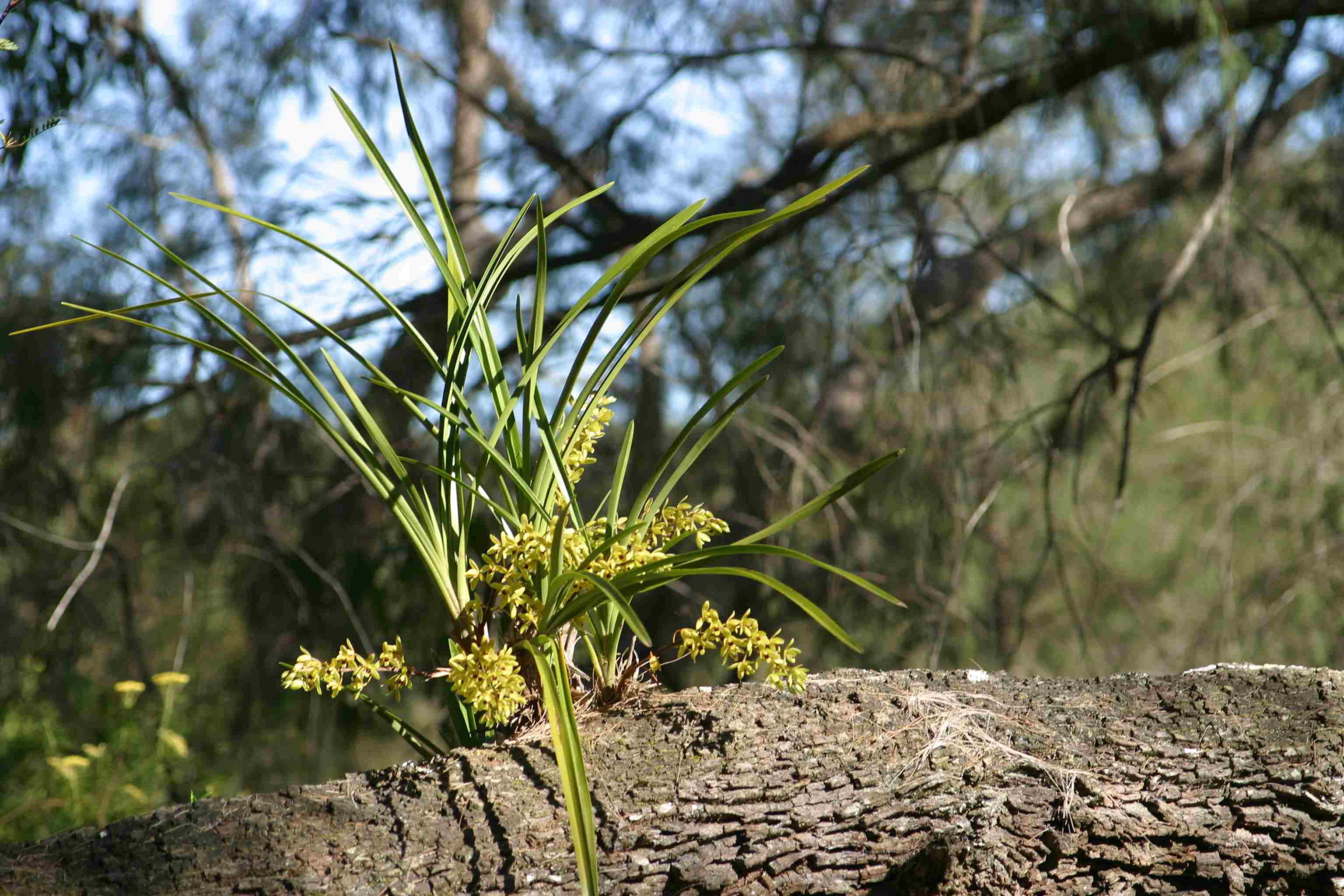
Habit

== Description ==
Cymbidium suave is an epiphytic herb that forms clumps of grass-like leaves but lacks prominent pseudobulbs. It has stems 300–500 mm (12–20 in) long and 15–20 mm (0.6–0.8 in) wide covered with overlapping leaf bases. There are between four and eight strap-shaped leaves 300–450 mm (12–18 in) long and 15–20 mm (0.59–0.79 in) wide on each stem. Between five and fifty strongly scented, olive green to dark or brownish green flowers 23–35 mm (0.91–1.4 in) long and 20–30 mm (0.79–1.2 in) wide are borne on an often arching flowering stem 100–300 mm (3.9–12 in) long. The sepals are 12–15 mm (0.47–0.59 in) long and 5–6 mm (0.20–0.24 in) wide and the petals are 8–11 mm (0.31–0.43 in) long and 5–6 mm (0.20–0.24 in) wide. The labellum is 8–11 mm (0.31–0.43 in) long and 7–8 mm (0.28–0.31 in) wide and faintly divided into three lobes. Flowering occurs between August and January.

== Taxonomy and naming ==
Cymbidium suave was first formally described in 1810 by Robert Brown who published the description in Prodromus Florae Novae Hollandiae et Insulae Van Diemen. The specific epithet (suave) is a Latin word meaning "sweet".

== Distribution and habitat ==
Snake orchid grows in woodland and forest in the hollows of old trees or in fallen, decaying trees. It occurs between Cooktown in Queensland and Bega in New South Wales and as far inland as Tamworth.
