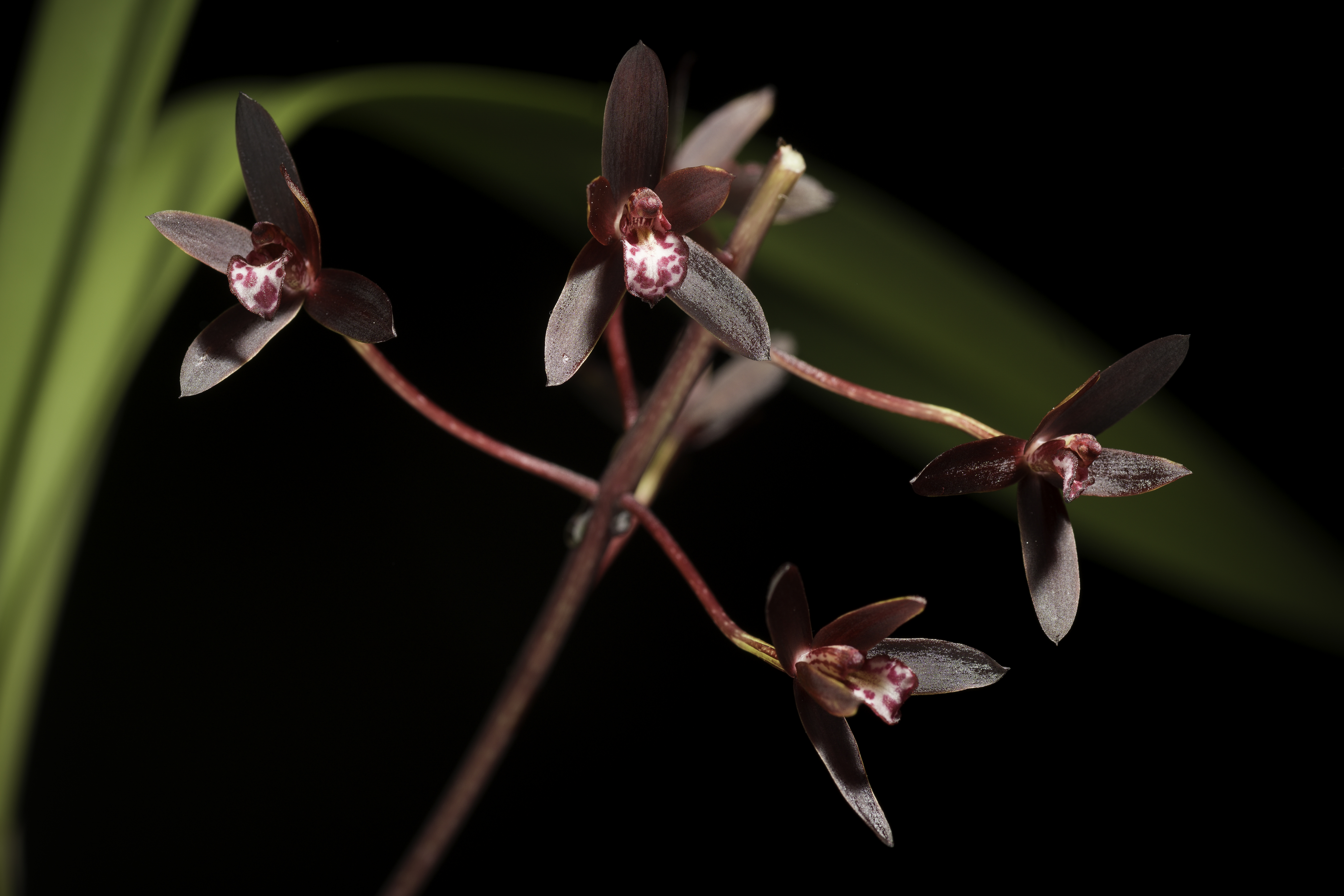
- Cymbidium canaliculatum flowers

Scientific classification
- Kingdom: Plantae
- Clade: Tracheophytes
- Clade: Angiosperms
- Clade: Monocots
- Order: Asparagales
- Family: Orchidaceae
- Subfamily: Epidendroideae
- Genus: Cymbidium
- Species: C. canaliculatum

Binomial name
- Cymbidium canaliculatum R.Br.

Synonyms
- List: Cymbidium canaliculatum f. aureolum Rupp; Cymbidium canaliculatum R.Br. f. canaliculatum; Cymbidium canaliculatum f. fuscum Rupp; Cymbidium canaliculatum f. inconstans Rupp nom. inval.; Cymbidium canaliculatum f. purpurascens Rupp; Cymbidium canaliculatum var. barrettii Nicholls; Cymbidium canaliculatum R.Br. var. canaliculatum; Cymbidium canaliculatum var. marginatum Rupp; Cymbidium canaliculatum var. sparkesii (Rendle) F.M.Bailey; Cymbidium hillii F.Muell.; Cymbidium sparkesii Rendle

= Cymbidium canaliculatum =

Channelled boat-lip orchid

Species of orchid

Cymbidium canaliculatum, commonly known as the channelled boat-lip orchid, tiger boat-lip orchid, native cymbidium or tiger orchid is a plant in the orchid family and is endemic to Australia. It is a clump-forming epiphyte with large, greyish green pseudobulbs, each with up to six curved, deeply channelled leaves and up to sixty fragrant, variably coloured flowers that often have spots and blotches and a white to cream-coloured labellum with red markings. This orchid usually grows in the forks or hollows of trees and is found from New South Wales to the northern parts of Western Australia.

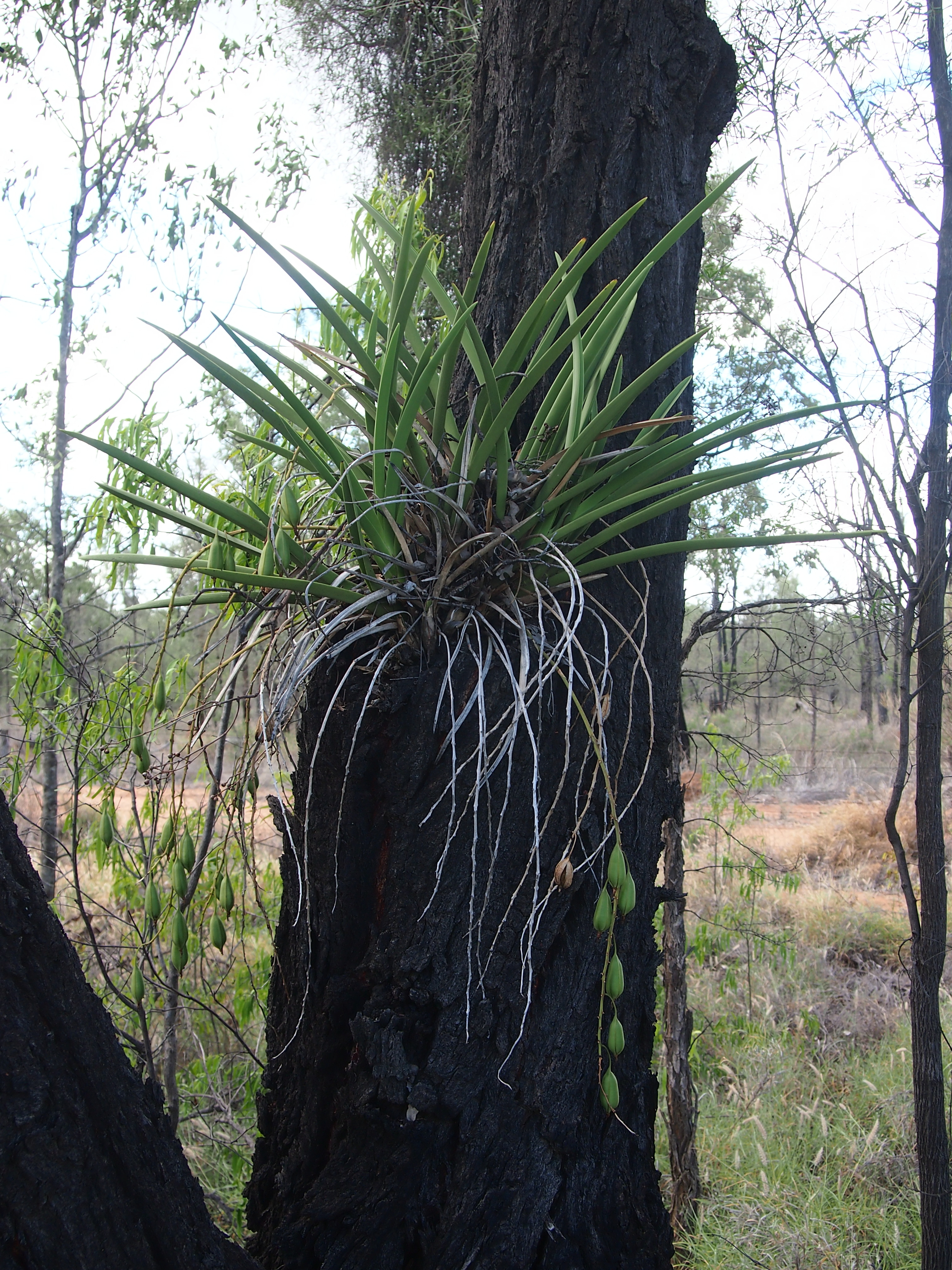
Habitat

== Description ==
Cymbidium canaliculatum is an epiphytic, clump-forming herb with greyish green pseudobulbs 80–120 mm (3.1–4.7 in) long and 30–40 mm (1–2 in) wide. Each pseudobulb has between two and six rigid, fleshy, curved, deeply channelled leaves 300–500 mm (12–20 in) and 30–40 mm (1–2 in) wide. Between five and sixty flowers, 25–45 mm (0.98–1.8 in) long and 20–40 mm (0.79–1.6 in) wide are borne on a flowering stem 200–400 mm (7.9–16 in) long. The flowers are olive green, yellow, brown or purple often with spots, blotches or both. The sepals are 15–25 mm (0.59–0.98 in) long and 7–10 mm (0.3–0.4 in) wide and the petals are 13–22 mm (0.51–0.87 in) long and 5–9 mm (0.2–0.4 in) wide. The labellum is usually white with red or purple markings, 15–20 mm (0.59–0.79 in) long and 8–10 mm (0.31–0.39 in) wide with three lobes. The side lobes are erect and the middle lobe curves downwards with a warty or hairy upper surface and two ridges along its midline. Flowering occurs between September and October.

== Taxonomy and naming ==
Cymbidium canaliculatum was first formally described in 1810 by Robert Brown who published the description in Prodromus Florae Novae Hollandiae et Insulae Van Diemen. The specific epithet (canaliculatum) is derived from the Latin word canaliculus meaning "canal" or "channel".

== Distribution and habitat ==
The channelled boat-lip orchid grows in the forks or hollows of trees in woodlands and drier forests in the Kimberley region of Western Australia, the northern parts of the Northern Territory, (including Melville Island) and from Cape York Peninsula in Queensland south to the Hunter River in New South Wales.
