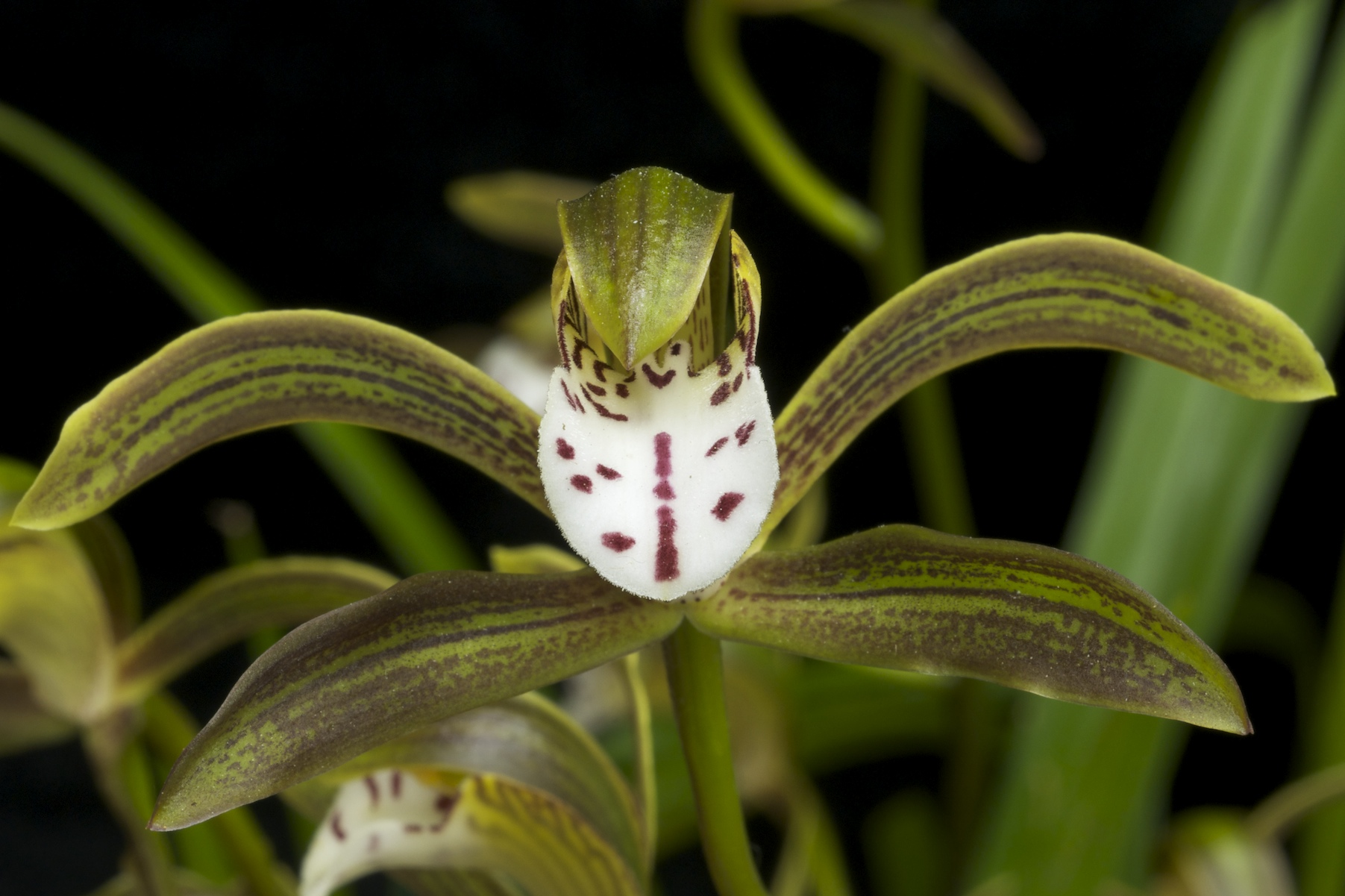

Scientific classification
- Kingdom: Plantae
- Clade: Tracheophytes
- Clade: Angiosperms
- Clade: Monocots
- Order: Asparagales
- Family: Orchidaceae
- Subfamily: Epidendroideae
- Genus: Cymbidium
- Species: C. erythraeum

Binomial name
- Cymbidium erythraeum Lindl. (1859)

Synonyms
- Cymbidium hennisianum Schltr. (1918); Cyperorchis hennisiana (Schltr.) Schltr. (1924)

= Cymbidium erythraeum =

Indian cymbidium

Species of orchid

Cymbidium erythraeum, the Indian cymbidium, is a species of orchid.
