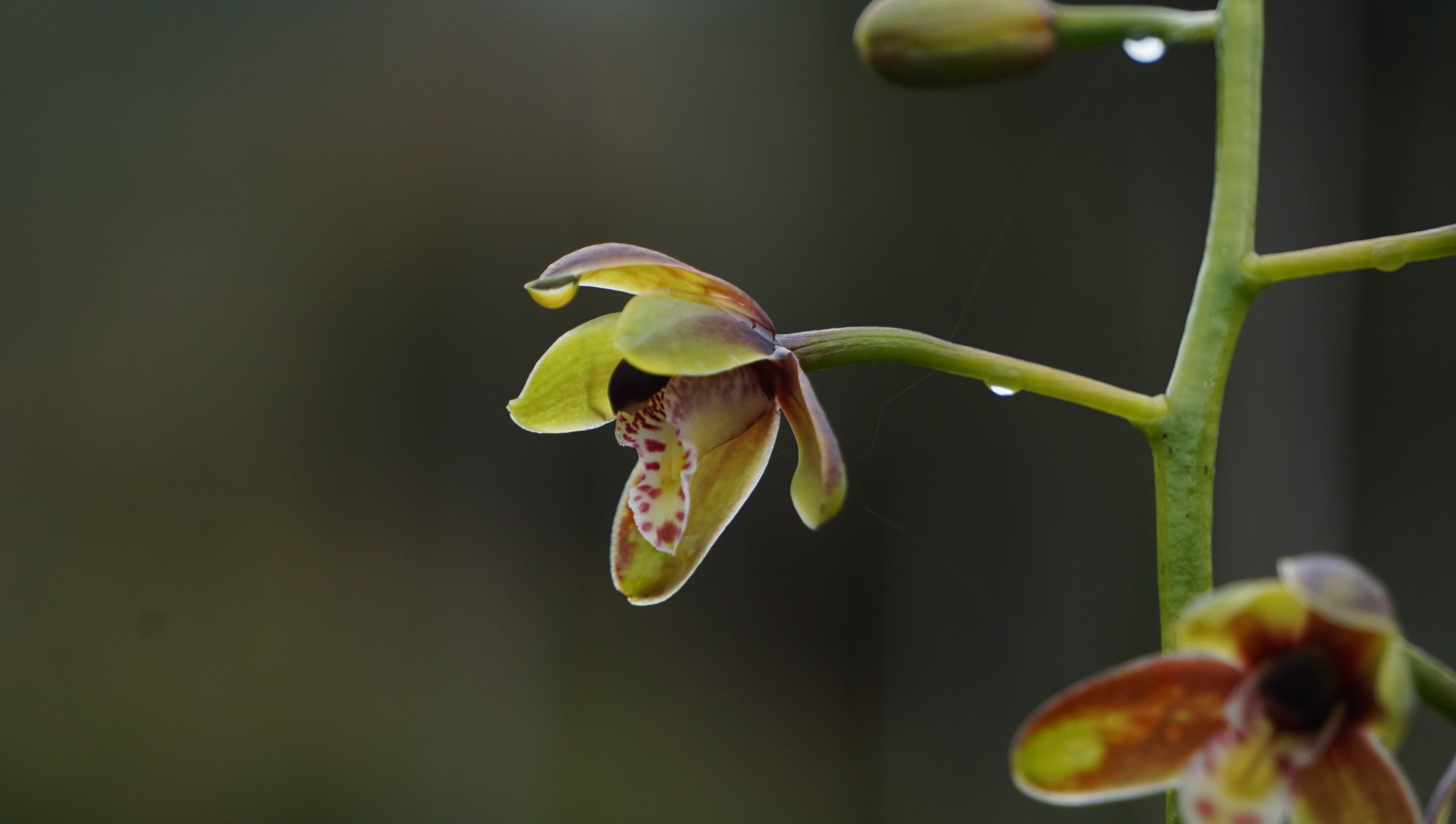

Scientific classification
- Kingdom: Plantae
- Clade: Tracheophytes
- Clade: Angiosperms
- Clade: Monocots
- Order: Asparagales
- Family: Orchidaceae
- Subfamily: Epidendroideae
- Genus: Cymbidium
- Species: C. hartinahianum

Binomial name
- Cymbidium hartinahianum J.B.Comber & Nasution

= Cymbidium hartinahianum =

Species of orchid

Cymbidium hartinahianum is a species of orchid endemic to North Sumatra, Indonesia. It was first found in 1976 by Rusdy E. Nasution, a researcher from Herbarium LBN/LIPI Bogor, at Desa Baniara Tele, Kecamatan Harian, Kabupaten Samosir, North Sumatra. This orchid is classified as 'extinct in the wild' and cannot be sold freely except as a human-propagated specimen. The flower can be found at Kebun Raya Bogor.

The orchid is named for Siti Hartinah, the wife of Indonesia's second president Suharto, in recognition of her efforts in orchid development in Indonesia.

== Description ==
Cymbidium hartinahianum is a pseudobulbous epiphyte. This flower grows best in direct sunlight and can be found surrounded by moss and Nepenthes. The leaves are 50–60 centimetres (20–24 in) long, ribbon-shaped with sharp ends. The flower is small and star-shaped, the top petals and sepals yellow-green, the lip reddish brown with a yellow border.
