= Cymbidium tigrinum =

Tiger-striped Cymbidium

Scientific classification
- Kingdom: Plantae
- Clade: Tracheophytes
- Clade: Angiosperms
- Clade: Monocots
- Order: Asparagales
- Family: Orchidaceae
- Subfamily: Epidendroideae
- Genus: Cymbidium
- Species: C. tigrinum

Binomial name
- Cymbidium tigrinum C.S.P. Parish ex Hook. (1864)

Synonyms
- Cyperorchis tigrina (C.S.P. Parish ex Hook.) Schltr. (1924)

Species of orchid

Cymbidium tigrinum is a species of orchid. It is found in the Yunnan province of China, Myanmar and northeast India.
