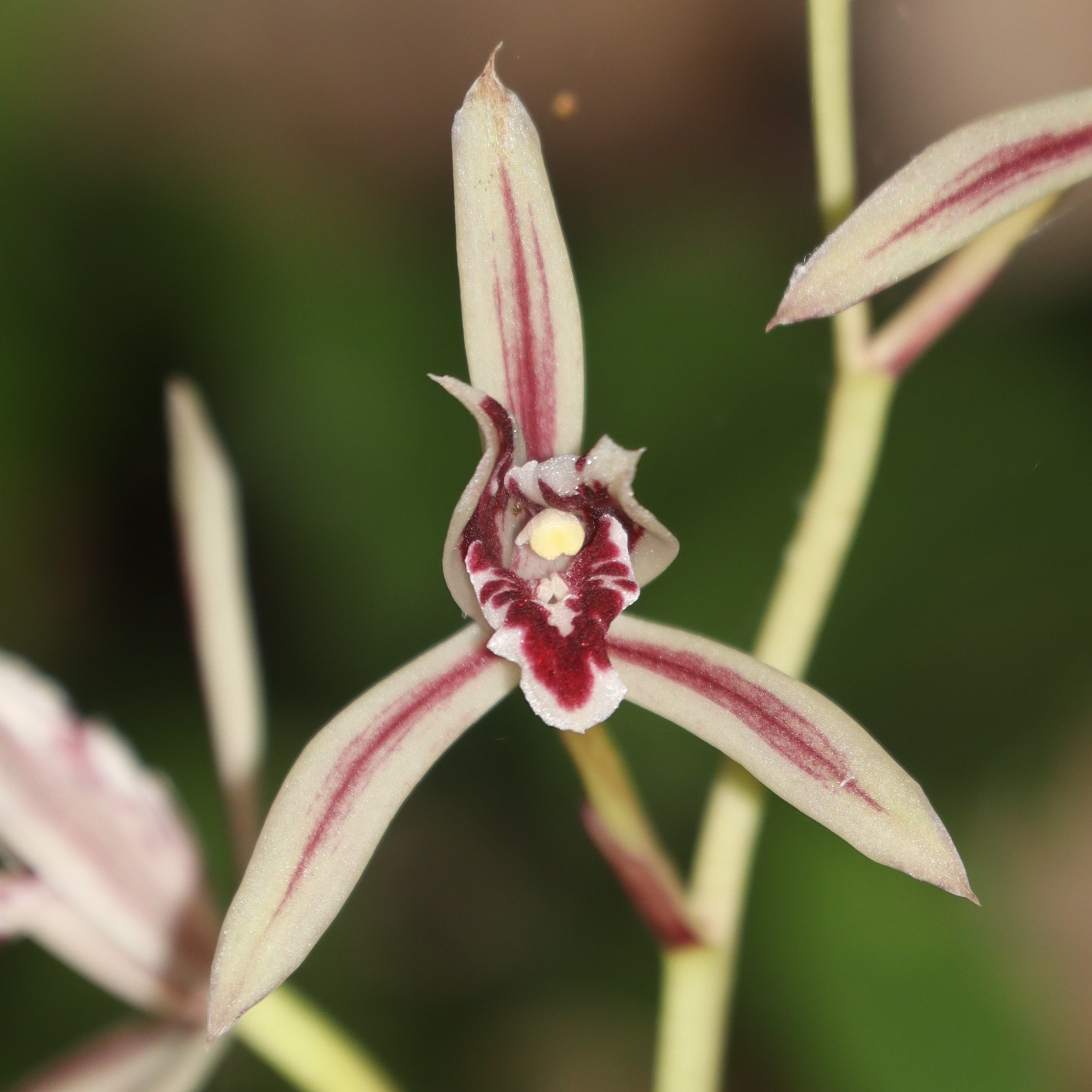

Scientific classification
- Kingdom: Plantae
- Clade: Tracheophytes
- Clade: Angiosperms
- Clade: Monocots
- Order: Asparagales
- Family: Orchidaceae
- Subfamily: Epidendroideae
- Genus: Cymbidium
- Species: C. macrorhizon

Binomial name
- Cymbidium macrorhizon D.Don.

= Cymbidium macrorhizon =

Species of tropical orchid

Cymbidium macrorhizon, sometimes known as the long rhizome cymbidium, is a species of orchid in the genus Cymbidium found in mostly tropical and some parts of temperate Asia.

== Description ==
The plant is up to 30 centimeters (11.811 inches) tall. The Rhizome is scaly and fleshy. There are 4 to 8 flowers at the top, being 3 to 4 centimeters (1.2 to 1.6 inches) across. The Sepals are pale brownish-olivegreen with some purplish, shortly acuminate or nearly cuspidate, up to 3 x 0.5 cm, their petals are shorter and broader, curved over the column. The Labellum is obscurely 3-lobed, whitish, marked with crimson blotches. The bract is 5 to 12 millimeters long.

== Distribution ==
The orchid has a mainly subtropical and tropical distribution and does extend into temperate areas. It is found from the Himalayas (Pakistan, India, Nepal, Himalayan China) through Indochina (Cambodia, Laos, Myanmar, Thailand, Vietnam) and East Asia (China, Ryukyu Islands of Japan, Korea, Taiwan).
