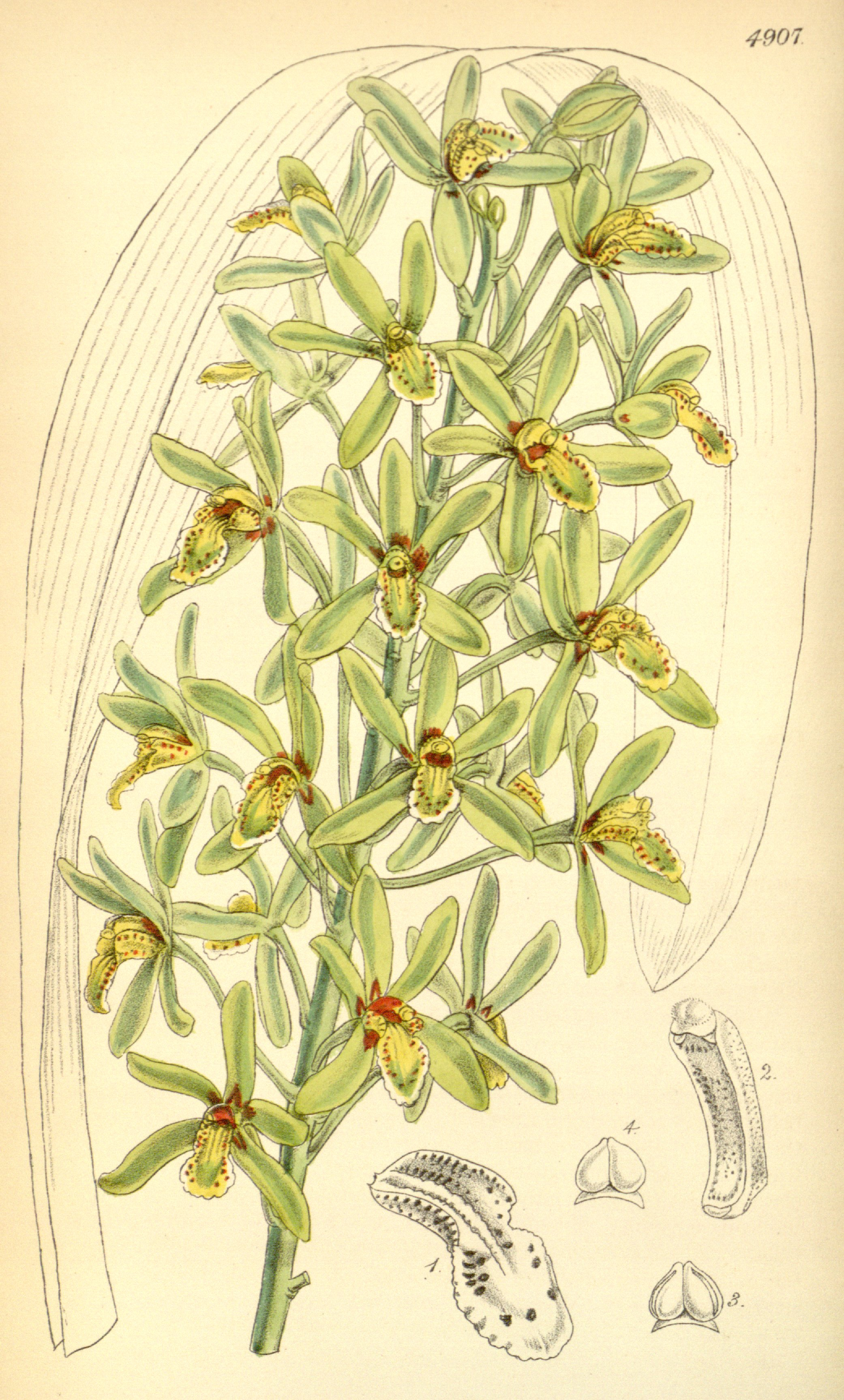

Scientific classification
- Kingdom: Plantae
- Clade: Tracheophytes
- Clade: Angiosperms
- Clade: Monocots
- Order: Asparagales
- Family: Orchidaceae
- Subfamily: Epidendroideae
- Genus: Cymbidium
- Species: C. chloranthum

Binomial name
- Cymbidium chloranthum Lindl. (1843)

Synonyms
- Cymbidium variciferum Rchb.f. (1856); Cymbidium sanguinolentum Teijsm. & Binn. (1862); Cymbidium pulchellum Schltr. (1910)

= Cymbidium chloranthum =

Green-flowered cymbidium

Species of orchid

Cymbidium chloranthum, the green-flowered cymbidium, is a species of orchid.
