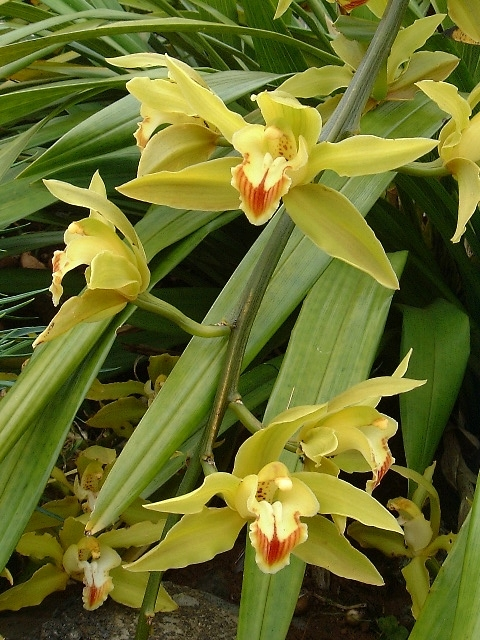
- Flowers

Scientific classification
- Kingdom: Plantae
- Clade: Tracheophytes
- Clade: Angiosperms
- Clade: Monocots
- Order: Asparagales
- Family: Orchidaceae
- Subfamily: Epidendroideae
- Genus: Cymbidium
- Species: C. lowianum

Binomial name
- Cymbidium lowianum (Rchb.f.) Rchb.f.

Synonyms
- List: Cymbidium hookerianum var. lowianum (Rchb.f.) Y.S.Wu & S.C.Chen; Cymbidium iansonii Rolfe; Cymbidium lowianum f. concolor (Rolfe) O.Gruss & M.Wolff; Cymbidium lowianum var. concolor Rolfe; Cymbidium lowianum var. iansonii (Rolfe) P.J.Cribb & Du Puy; Cyperorchis iansonii (Rolfe) Schltr.; Cyperorchis lowiana (Rchb.f.) Schltr.

= Cymbidium lowianum =

Species of plant in the genus Cymbidium

Cymbidium lowianum, called Low's boat orchid, is a species of orchid in the genus Cymbidium, native to Assam in India, Yunnan in China, Myanmar, Thailand, and Vietnam. It has gained the Royal Horticultural Society's Award of Garden Merit.

== Subtaxa ==
The following varieties are currently accepted:

- Cymbidium lowianum var. ailaoense X.M.Xu
- Cymbidium lowianum var. kalawense (Colyear) Govaerts
- Cymbidium lowianum var. lowianum
