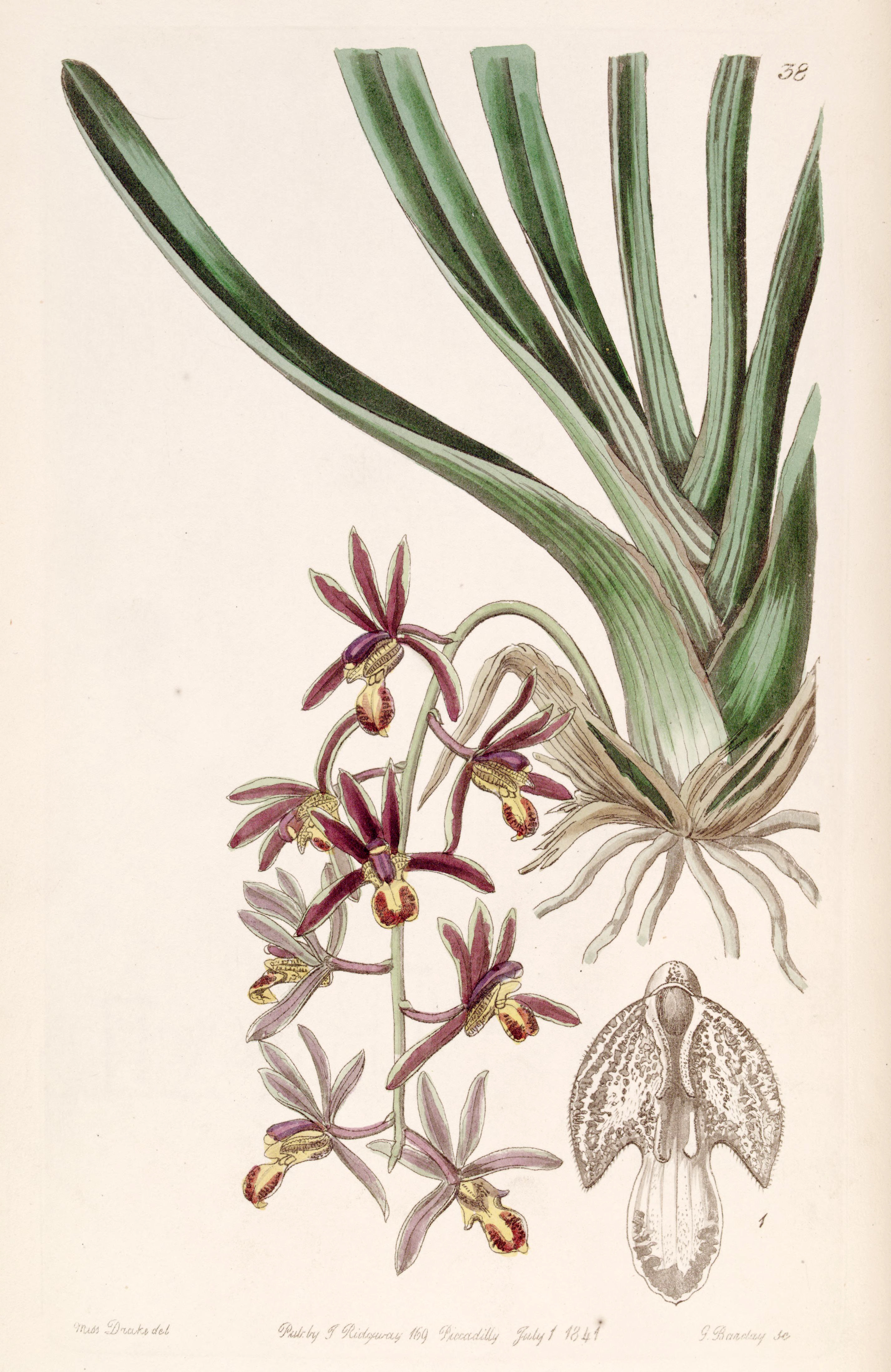
- Cymbidium bicolor ssp. pubescens

Scientific classification
- Kingdom: Plantae
- Clade: Tracheophytes
- Clade: Angiosperms
- Clade: Monocots
- Order: Asparagales
- Family: Orchidaceae
- Subfamily: Epidendroideae
- Genus: Cymbidium
- Species: C. bicolor

Binomial name
- Cymbidium bicolor (L.) Sw. (1799): Cymbidium bicolor. ssp. obtusum Du Puy & P.J.Cribb (1988); Synonyms: Cymbidium crassifolium Wall. (1832), Cymbidium mannii Rchb.f. (1872), Cymbidium flaccidum Schltr. (1913): Cymbidium bicolor ssp. pubescens (Lindl.) Du Puy & P.J.Cribb (1988); Synonyms: Cymbidium pubescens Lindl. (1840) (Basionym), Cymbidium pubescens var. celebicum Schltr. (1911), Cymbidium celebicum (Schltr.) Schltr. (1925)

= Cymbidium bicolor =

Two-colored cymbidium

Species of orchid

Cymbidium bicolor, the two-colored cymbidium, is a species of orchid found in South China to Tropical Asia.

Subspecies

  - Cymbidium bicolor subsp. bicolor (S. India, Sri Lanka) Pseudobulb epiphyte
  - Cymbidium bicolor subsp. obtusum (Himalaya to S. China and Indo-China). Pseudobulb epiphyte
  - Cymbidium bicolor subsp. pubescens (W. & C. Malaysia)
