= Cymbidium cochleare =

Scientific classification
- Kingdom: Plantae
- Clade: Tracheophytes
- Clade: Angiosperms
- Clade: Monocots
- Order: Asparagales
- Family: Orchidaceae
- Subfamily: Epidendroideae
- Genus: Cymbidium
- Species: C. cochleare

Binomial name
- Cymbidium cochleare Lindl.

Species of orchid

Cymbidium cochleare is a species of orchid native to the eastern Himalayas, China (South-West Yunnan), Taiwan.
