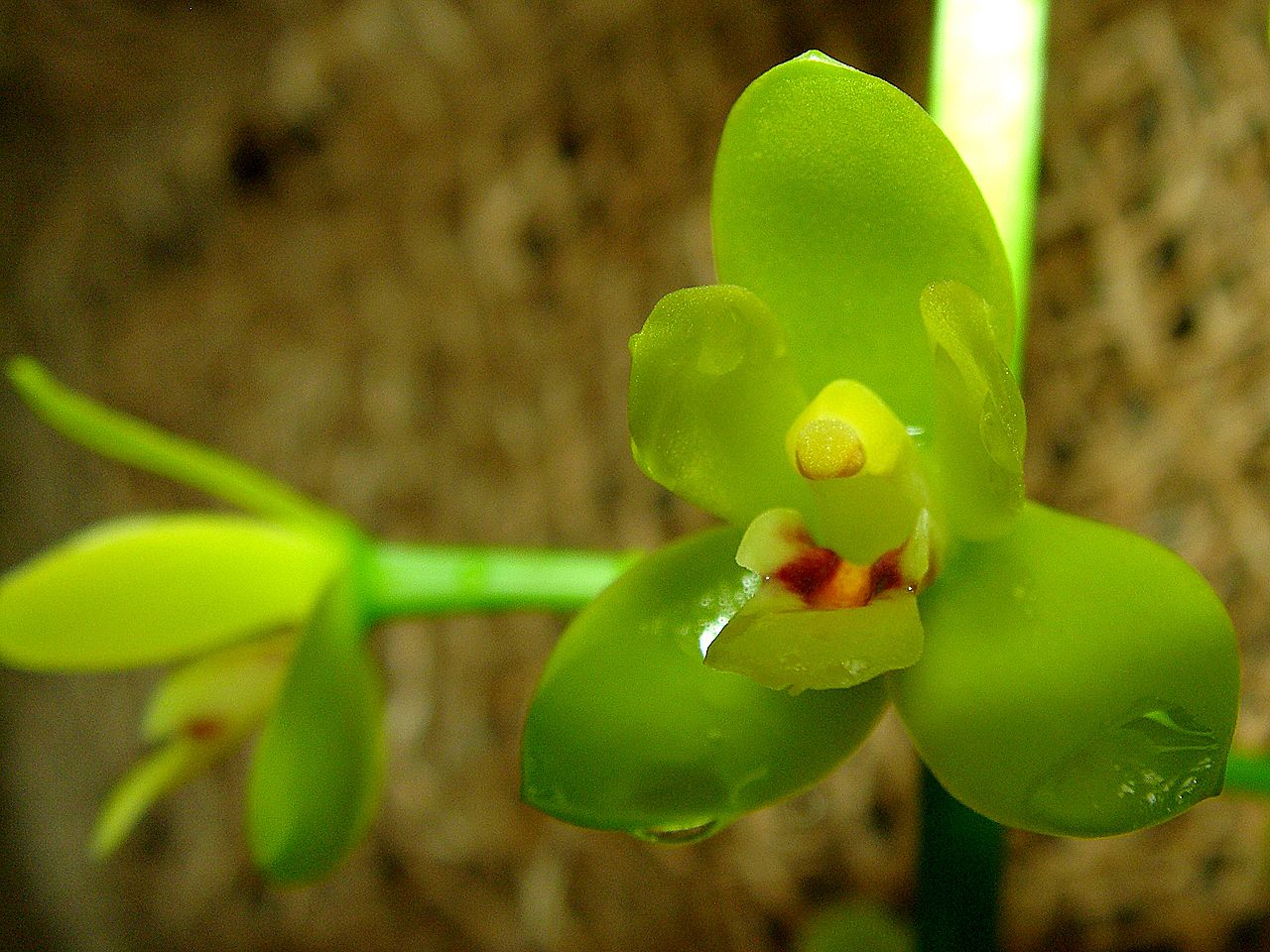

Scientific classification
- Kingdom: Plantae
- Clade: Tracheophytes
- Clade: Angiosperms
- Clade: Monocots
- Order: Asparagales
- Family: Orchidaceae
- Subfamily: Epidendroideae
- Genus: Cymbidium
- Species: C. madidum

Binomial name
- Cymbidium madidum Lindl.

Synonyms
- Cymbidium albuciflorum F.Muell.; Cymbidium iridifolium A.Cunn. ex Lindl. nom. illeg.; Cymbidium leae Rendle; Cymbidium leroyi St.Cloud; Cymbidium madidum var. leroyi (St.Cloud) Menninger; Cymbidium queeneanum Klinge

= Cymbidium madidum =

Giant boat-lip orchid

Species of orchid

Cymbidium madidum, commonly known as giant boat-lip orchid, is a plant in the orchid family and is endemic to north-eastern Australia. It is a clump-forming epiphyte or lithophyte with crowded pseudobulbs, each with between four and eight flat, strap-shaped, thin leaves and up to seventy olive green flowers with the sepals and petals curving forwards. It is found in moist habitats in eastern Queensland and north-eastern New South Wales.

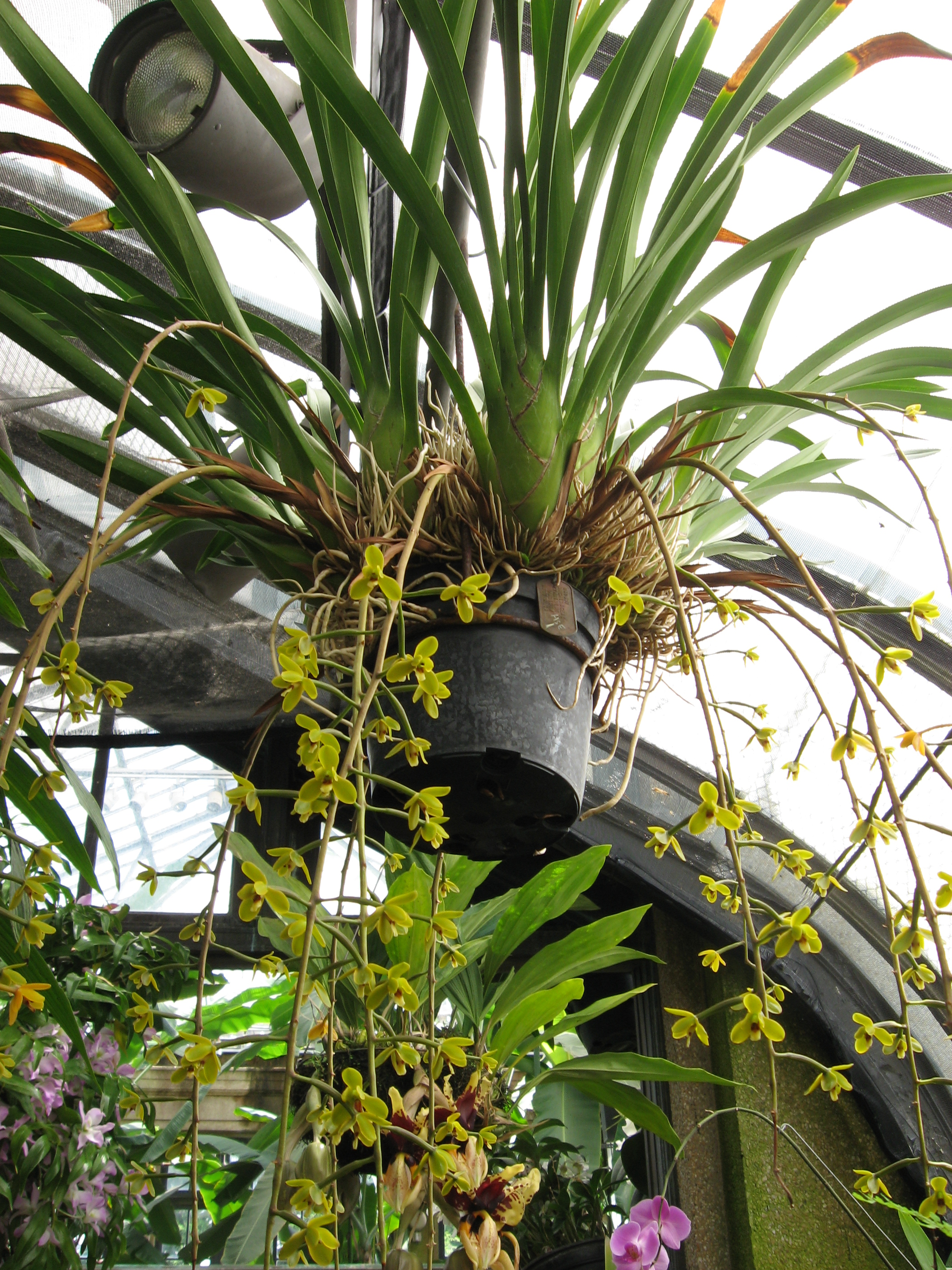
Cultivated specimen in the Heidelberg Botanic Garden

== Description ==
Cymbidium madidum is an epiphytic or lithophytic, clump-forming herb with crowded, oval, slightly flattened, green pseudobulbs 120–250 mm (4.7–9.8 in) and 40–60 mm (1.6–2.4 in) wide. Each pseudobulb has between four and eight thin, strap-like, flexible leaves 300–900 mm (12–35 in) and 30–40 mm (1–2 in) wide. Between ten and seventy olive green to brownish green flowers, 22–35 mm (0.87–1.4 in) long and 20–30 mm (0.79–1.2 in) wide are borne on an arching flowering stem 200–600 mm (7.9–24 in) long. The sepals and petals curve forward rather than spread widely, the sepals 12–15 mm (0.47–0.59 in) long and 5–6 mm (0.20–0.24 in) wide, the petals 10–13 mm (0.39–0.51 in) long and 4–5 mm (0.16–0.20 in) wide. The labellum is 12–15 mm (0.47–0.59 in) long and 5–6 mm (0.20–0.24 in) wide with three lobes. The side lobes are erect and the middle lobe is yellowish and has a shiny ridge along its midline. Flowering occurs between August and February.

== Taxonomy and naming ==
Cymbidium madidum was first formally described in 1840 by John Lindley who published the description in Edwards's Botanical Register. The specific epithet (madidum) is a Latin word meaning "moist", "soaked" or "sodden".

== Distribution and habitat ==
Giant boat-lip orchid grows in rainforest and other moist habitats on trees with fibrous or papery bark and on rocks and cliffs. It is found from the Cape York Peninsula in Queensland south to the Hastings River in New South Wales.

=== Traditional uses ===
Aboriginal Australians and early European settlers used pseudobulbs of Cymbidium madidum for dysentery and its seeds were used as an oral contraceptive.
