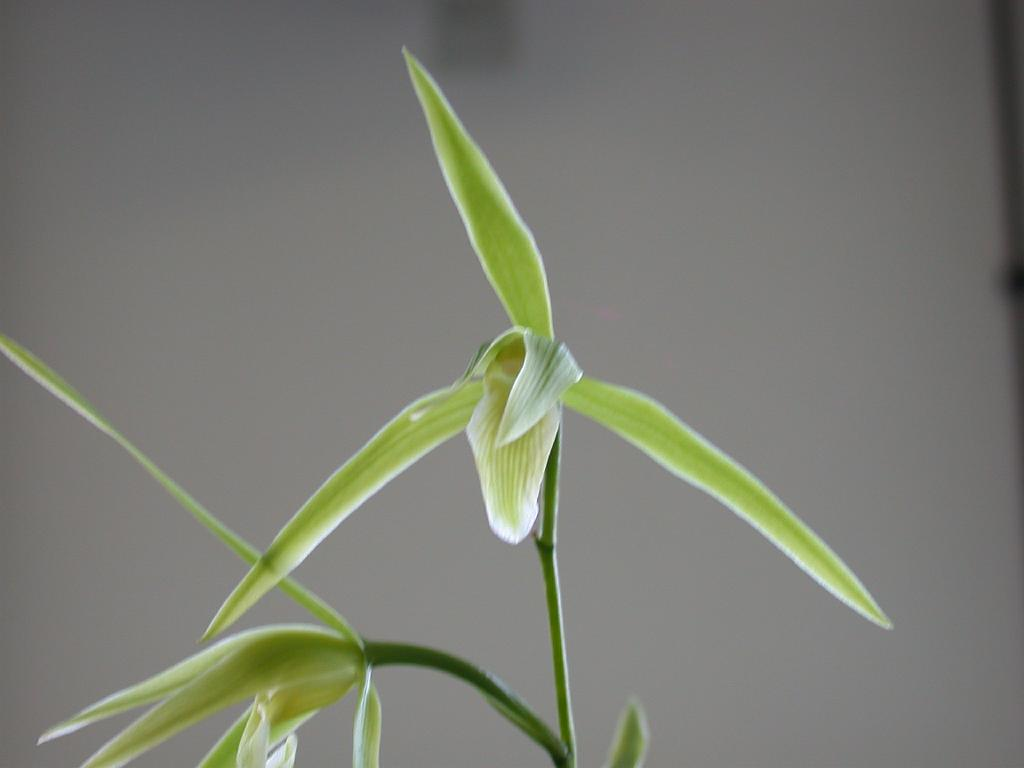

Scientific classification
- Kingdom: Plantae
- Clade: Tracheophytes
- Clade: Angiosperms
- Clade: Monocots
- Order: Asparagales
- Family: Orchidaceae
- Subfamily: Epidendroideae
- Genus: Cymbidium
- Species: C. kanran

Binomial name
- Cymbidium kanran Makino

Synonyms
- Homotypic Synonyms: Cymbidium kanran var. latifolium Makino; Cymbidium kanran f. purpurascens Makino; Cymbidium kanran var. purpureohiemale (Hayata) S.S.Ying; Cymbidium kanran f. viridescens Makino; Cymbidium linearisepalum Yamam.; Cymbidium linearisepalum var. atropurpureum (Yamam.) Masam.; Cymbidium linearisepalum f. atropurpureum Yamam.; Cymbidium linearisepalum var. atrovirens (Yamam.) Masam.; Cymbidium linearisepalum f. atrovirens Yamam.; Cymbidium nigrovenium Z.J.Liu & J.N.Zhang; Cymbidium oreophilum Hayata; Cymbidium purpureohiemale Hayata; Cymbidium sinokanran T.C.Yen; Cymbidium sinokanran var. atropurpureum T.C.Yen; Cymbidium tosyaense Masam.

= Cymbidium kanran =

Cold-growing cymbidium

Species of orchid

Cymbidium kanran, the cold-growing cymbidium, is a species of orchid in the family Orchidaceae. The species was first described by Tomitaro Makino in 1902 and was first domesticated over 2,500 years ago. It is native to South Central China, Southeast China, Hainan, Japan, Korea, Nansei-shoto, Taiwan, Tibet, and Vietnam.

== Characteristics ==
Being lithophytic, it grows in rocky regions, specifically in the grooves created in the rocks by erosion. It likes cold climates and any uninhabited site at altitudes of 700 to 1800 metres above sea level. They grow from October to January, and when they are growing, on a single stem, up to 12 flowers can bloom
