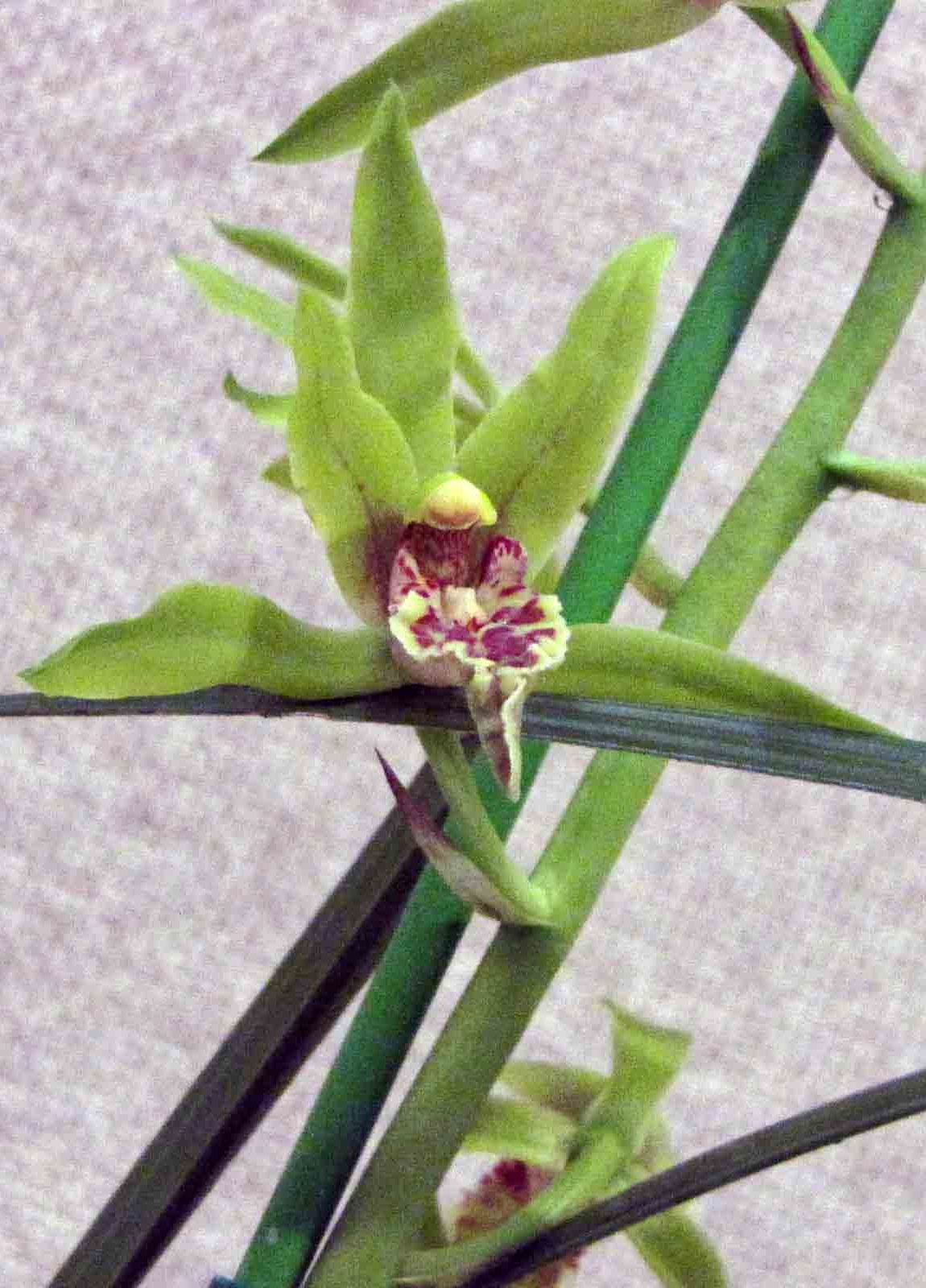

Scientific classification
- Kingdom: Plantae
- Clade: Tracheophytes
- Clade: Angiosperms
- Clade: Monocots
- Order: Asparagales
- Family: Orchidaceae
- Subfamily: Epidendroideae
- Genus: Cymbidium
- Species: C. faberi

Binomial name
- Cymbidium faberi Rolfe. 1896.

Synonyms
- Cymbidium cerinum Schltr.; Cymbidium fukiense T.C.Yen; Cymbidium oiwakense Hayata; Cymbidium scabroserrulatum Makino; Eulophia yunnanensis Rolfe; Semiphajus evrardii Gagnep.

= Cymbidium faberi =

Species of plant

Cymbidium faberi, commonly known as Faber's cymbidium is a species of boat orchid. It is a pseudobulbous geophyte found from Nepal to Taiwan and Myanmar.

== Distribution and habitat ==
Cymbidium faberi is native to China (North-Central, South-Central, Southeast), east Himalayas, Myanmar, Nepal, Tibet, and Taiwan.

Under natural conditions, it is typically found in sunny grasslands or under sparse forests in elevations of 1500-3000 meters from sea level.

== Description ==
It is a pseudobulbous geophyte.

The flowers are 5-7 cm in diameter, and are pale green, pale yellow or tinged with light purple. The sepals are oblong to oblanceolate, 2.4-3.2 cm long and 6-8 mm wide and the petals are lanceolate, 2.2 to 2.6 cm (0.87 to 1.02 in) long and 7 to 9 mm (0.28 to 0.35 in) wide.

The leaves are linear, 60 to 90 cm (24 to 35 in) long and 8 to 12 mm (0.31 to 0.47 in) wide.
