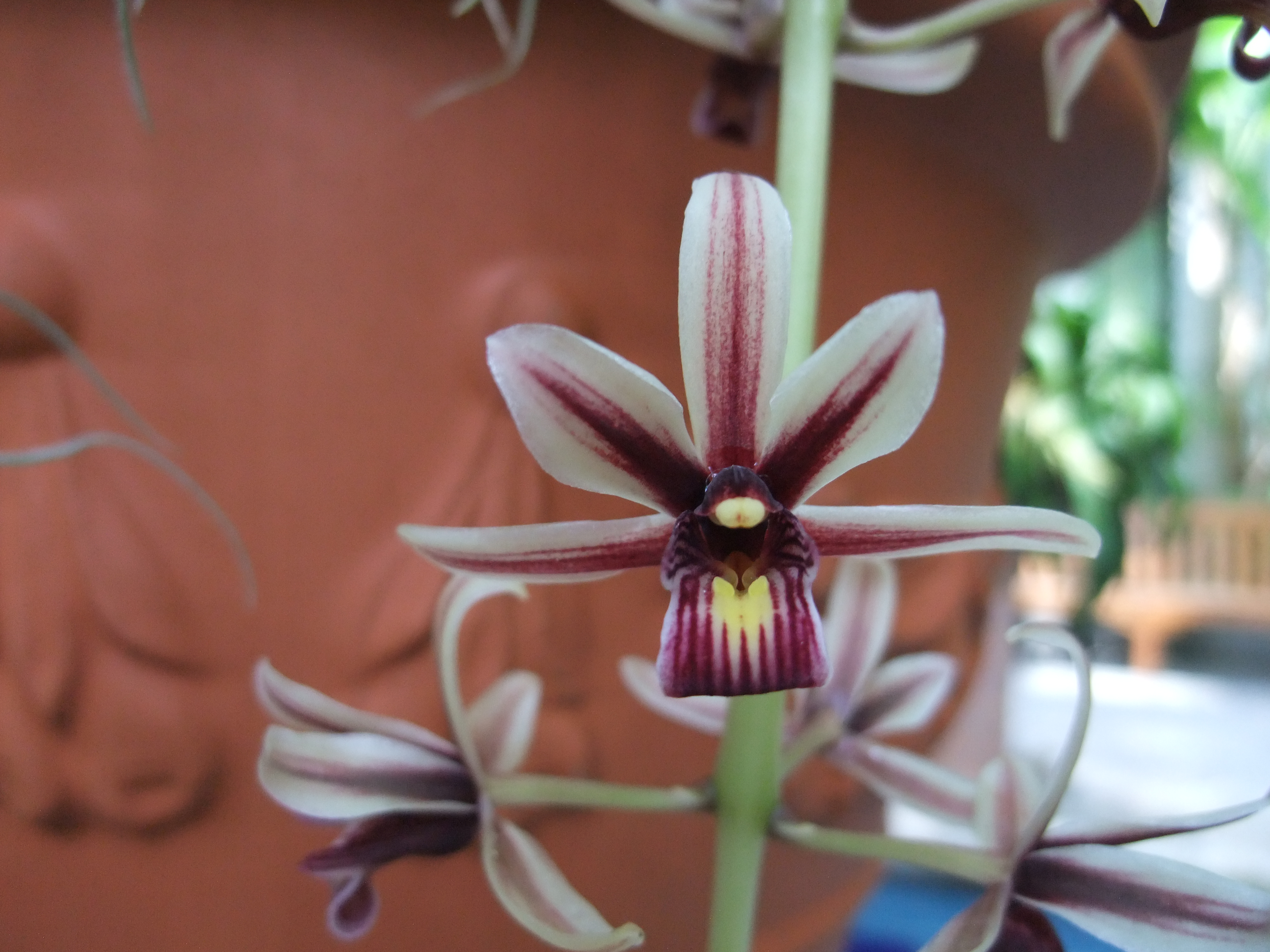

Scientific classification
- Kingdom: Plantae
- Clade: Tracheophytes
- Clade: Angiosperms
- Clade: Monocots
- Order: Asparagales
- Family: Orchidaceae
- Subfamily: Epidendroideae
- Genus: Cymbidium
- Species: C. aloifolium

Binomial name
- Cymbidium aloifolium (L.) Sw.

Synonyms
- Epidendrum aloifolium L. (1753) (Basionym); Epidendrum pendulum Roxb. (1795); Epidendrum aloides Curtis (1797); Cymbidium pendulum (Roxb.) Sw. (1799); Aerides borassii Buch.-Ham. ex Sm. (1818); Cymbidium erectum Wight (1851); Cymbidium simulans Rolfe (1917); Cymbidium intermedium H.G. Jones (1974)

= Cymbidium aloifolium =

Aloe-leafed cymbidium

Species of orchid

Cymbidium aloifolium, the aloe-leafed cymbidium, is a species of orchid found in Asia, especially China and southeast Asia from Burma to Sumatra. It can be found growing between rocks or on another plant. The word cymbidium comes from the Greek kumbos meaning "hole, cavity" and the Latin specific name is just a translation of the English "aloe-leafed".
