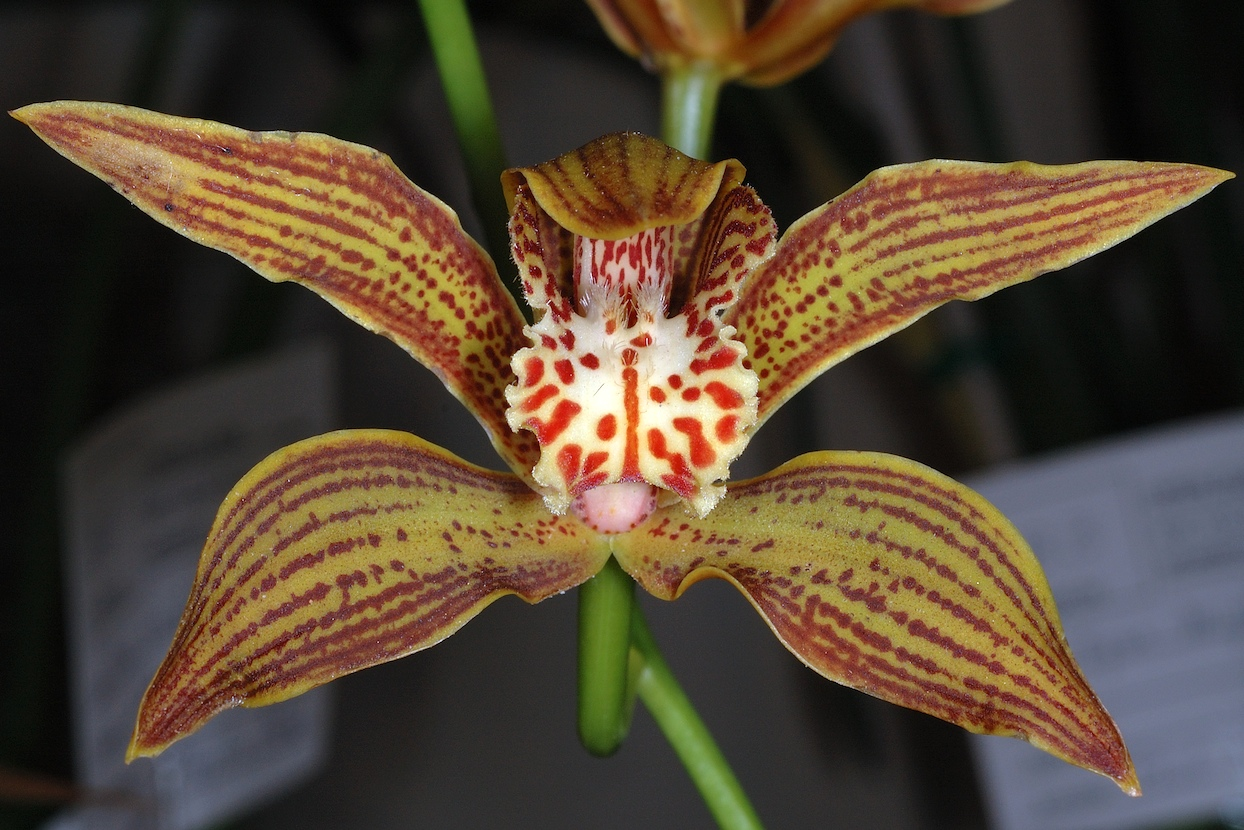

Scientific classification
- Kingdom: Plantae
- Clade: Tracheophytes
- Clade: Angiosperms
- Clade: Monocots
- Order: Asparagales
- Family: Orchidaceae
- Subfamily: Epidendroideae
- Genus: Cymbidium
- Species: C. iridioides

Binomial name
- Cymbidium iridioides D.Don.

= Cymbidium iridioides =

Iris-like cymbidium

Species of orchid

Cymbidium iridioides, commonly known as the Iris-Like Cymbidium is a species of boat orchid. It is a pseudobulbous epiphyte found from Himalaya to south-central China.

== Distribution and habitat ==
Cymbidium iridioides is native to Assam, south-central China, Himalaya, Myanmar, Nepal, Tibet, Vietnam.

Under natural conditions, it is found on trees or rocks, and on shaded cliffs at elevations of 900–2800 meters from sea level.

== Description ==
It is a pseudobulbous epiphyte. The pseudobulbs are 4 to 11 cm (1.6 to 4.3 in) long and 2 to 5 cm (0.79 to 1.97 in) wide, and are ellipsoid-ovoid to narrowly ovoid.

The flowers are 9 to 10 cm (3.5 to 3.9 in) in diameter, the pedicel and ovary are 40 to 45 mm (1.6 to 1.8 in). The sepals and the petals are yellowish green, with 7–9 brownish to reddish brown longitudinal stripes. The lip is yellowish, with red or brown stripes on the lateral lobes and on the mid-lobe. The sepals are narrowly obovate-oblong, and are 37 to 45 mm (1.5 to 1.8 in) × 12 to 15 mm (0.47 to 0.59 in). The petals are slightly falcate, and are 35 to 46 mm (1.4 to 1.8 in) × 7 to 9 mm (0.28 to 0.35 in)
