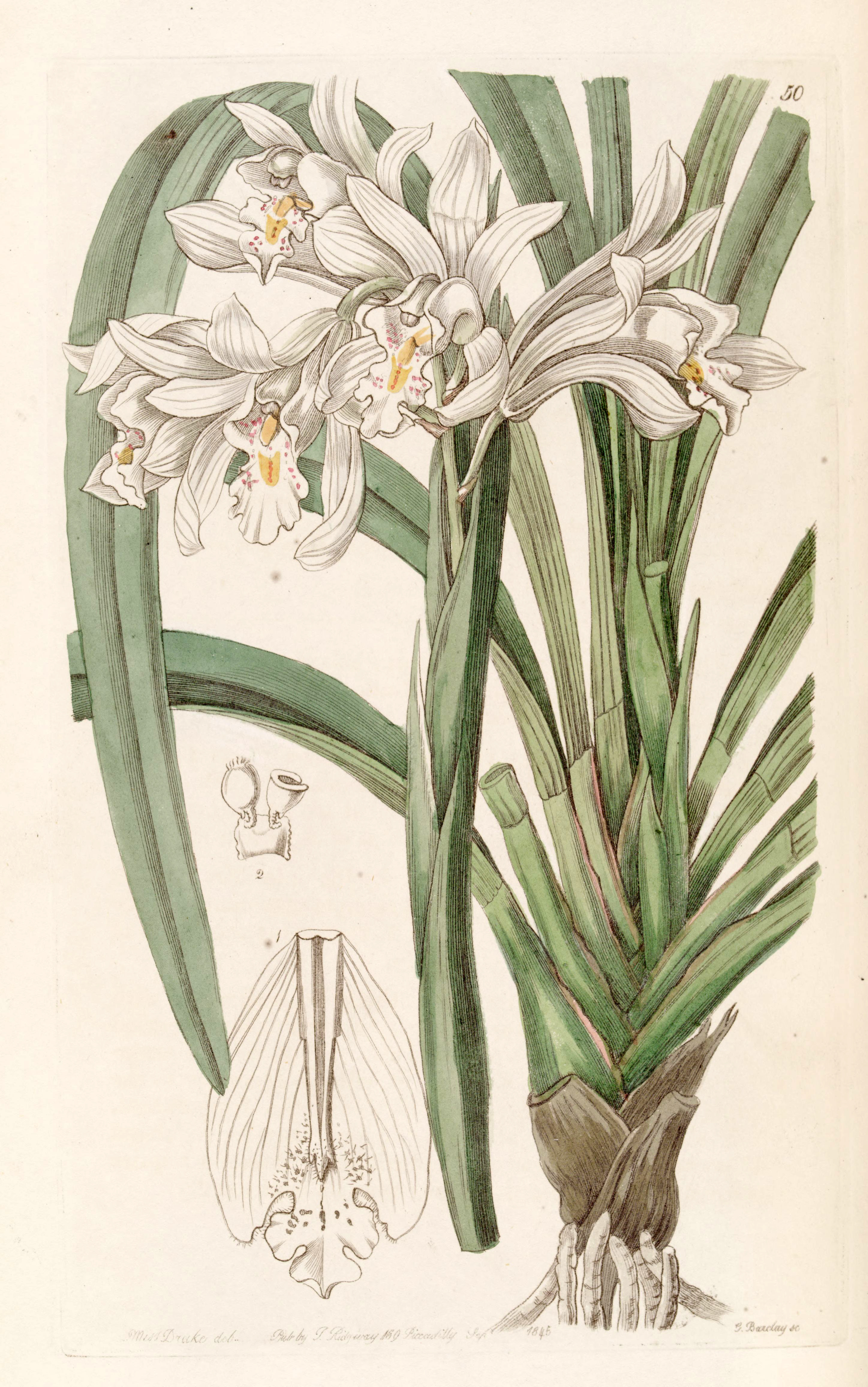

Scientific classification
- Kingdom: Plantae
- Clade: Tracheophytes
- Clade: Angiosperms
- Clade: Monocots
- Order: Asparagales
- Family: Orchidaceae
- Subfamily: Epidendroideae
- Genus: Cymbidium
- Species: C. mastersii

Binomial name
- Cymbidium mastersii Griff. ex Lindl. (1845)

Synonyms
- Cymbidium affine Griff. (1851); Cymbidium micromeson Lindl. (1859); Cyperorchis mastersii (Griff. ex Lindl.) Benth. (1881); Cymbidium maguanense F.Y.Liu (1996)

= Cymbidium mastersii =

Master's cymbidium

Species of orchid

Cymbidium mastersii, the Master's cymbidium, is a species of orchid.
