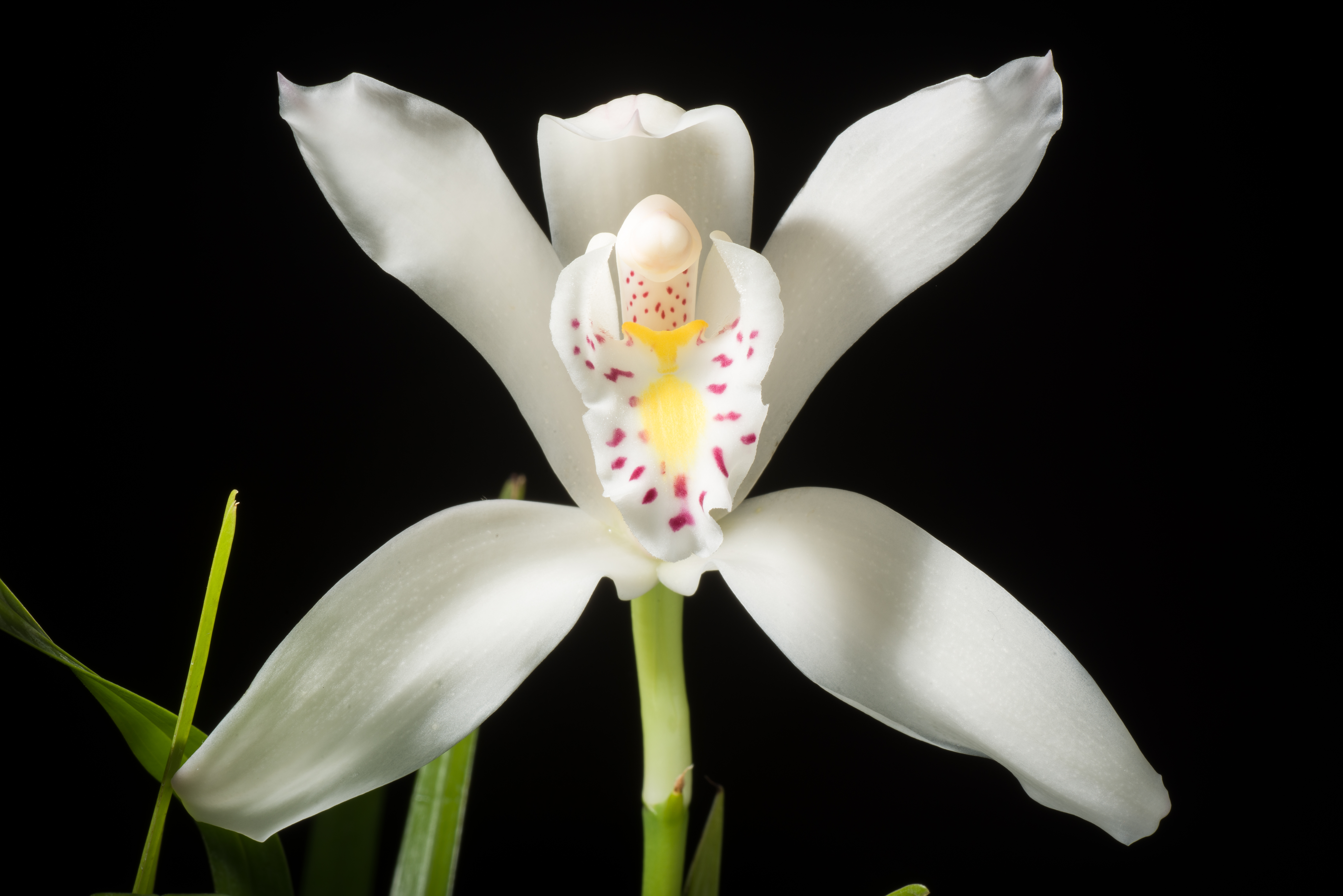

Scientific classification
- Kingdom: Plantae
- Clade: Tracheophytes
- Clade: Angiosperms
- Clade: Monocots
- Order: Asparagales
- Family: Orchidaceae
- Subfamily: Epidendroideae
- Genus: Cymbidium
- Species: C. eburneum

Binomial name
- Cymbidium eburneum Lindl. (1847)

Synonyms
- Cymbidium syringodorum Griff. (1851); Cyperorchis eburnea (Lindl.) Schltr. (1924)

= Cymbidium eburneum =

Ivory-colored cymbidium

Species of orchid

Cymbidium eburneum, the ivory-colored cymbidium, is a species of orchid.

"Cymbidium eburneum, Lindley. - A remarkably handsome evergreen species, one of the finest of the genus. It is of very compact growth, forming graceful tufts of distichous linear-lorate foliage. The spike is erect, about 9 to 12 inches high, the flowers very large and fragrant, with pure white sepals and petals, and a lip of the same colour, with a crispy front lobe, and having a bold band of yellow in the centre, behind which is a long yellow fleshy pubescent crest. It blooms in February and March, and lasts a long time in perfection. ...

There are three varieties; of these a very pretty one grown by the late J. Day, Esq., Tottenham, is of smaller growth than the type, the flowers not so large, but the sepals and petals pure white, as also is the lip, which has a blotch of yellow in the centre and rose-coloured spots on each side. - Khasya: elevation 5,000 - 6,000 feet.

The variety WILLIAMSIANUM, Rchd.F., has the front lobes of the lip and the tips of the side lobes light purple."
