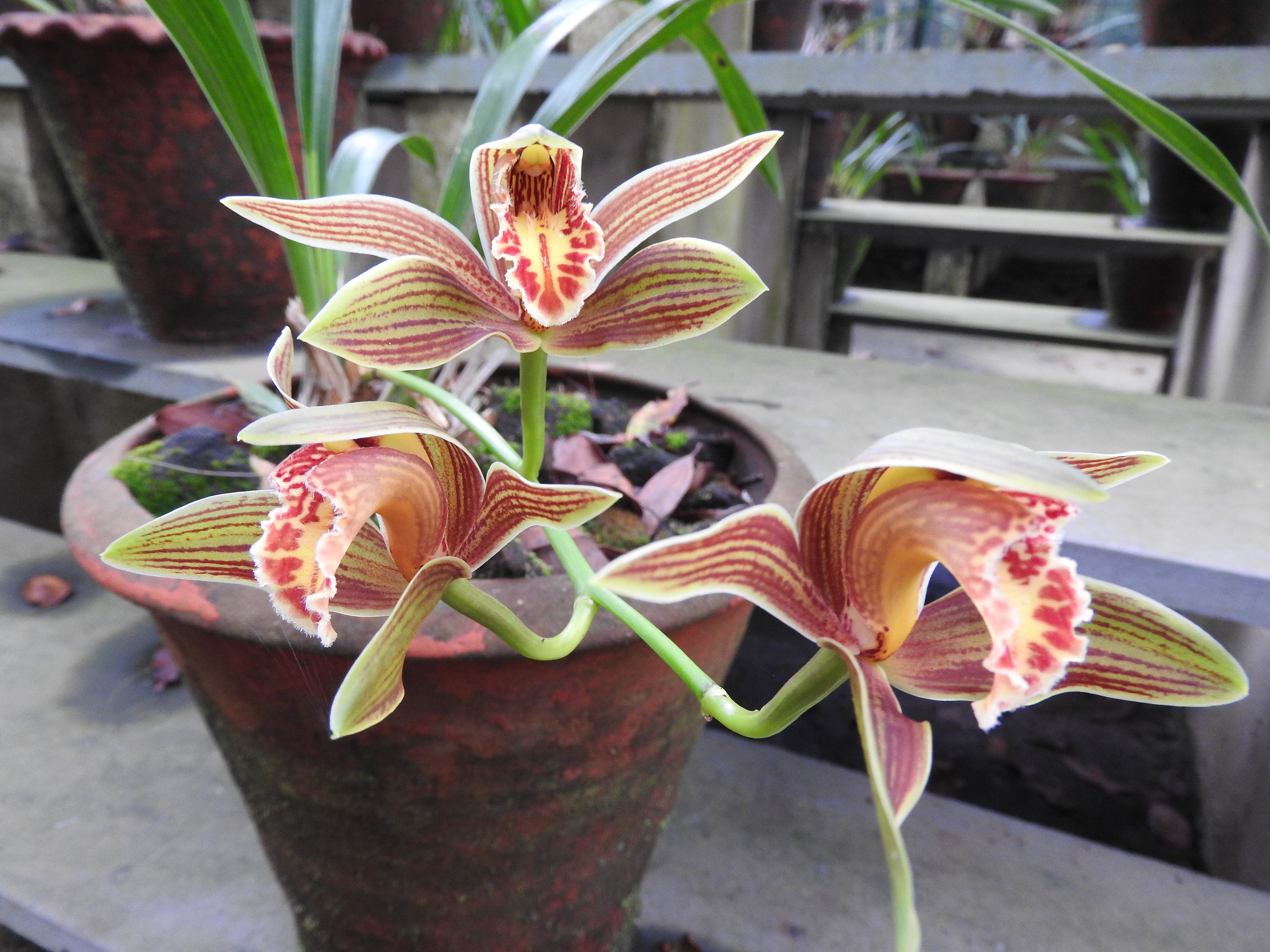
- Cymbidium iridioides

Scientific classification
- Kingdom: Plantae
- Clade: Tracheophytes
- Clade: Angiosperms
- Clade: Monocots
- Order: Asparagales
- Family: Orchidaceae
- Subfamily: Epidendroideae
- Tribe: Cymbidieae
- Subtribe: Cymbidiinae
- Genus: Cymbidium; Swartz

Type species
- Cymbidium aloifolium

Species
- See text

Synonyms
- Arethusantha Finet; Cymbidiopsis H.J.Chowdhery; × Cyperocymbidium A.D.Hawkes; Cyperorchis Carl Ludwig BlumeBlume; Iridorchis Blume nom. illeg.; Jensoa Raf.; Liuguishania Z.J.Liu & J.N.Zhang; Pachyrhizanthe (Schltr.) Nakai; Wutongshania Z.J.Liu & J.N.Zhang

= Cymbidium =

Genus of flowering plants in the orchid family Orchidaceae

Cymbidium /sɪmˈbɪdiəm/, commonly known as boat orchids, is a genus of evergreen flowering plants in the orchid family Orchidaceae. Orchids in this genus are epiphytic, lithophytic, terrestrial or rarely leafless saprophytic herbs usually with pseudobulbs. There are usually between three and twelve leaves arranged in two ranks on each pseudobulb or shoot and lasting for several years. From one to a large number of flowers are arranged on an unbranched flowering stem arising from the base of the pseudobulb. The sepals and petals are all free from and similar to each other. The labellum is significantly different from the other petals and the sepals and has three lobes. There are about fifty-five species and sixteen further natural hybrids occurring in the wild from tropical and subtropical Asia to Australia. Cymbidiums are well known in horticulture and many cultivars have been developed. The genome of Cymbidium mannii has been sequenced to study epiphytism and crassulacean acid metabolism.

== Description ==
Plants in the genus Cymbidium are epiphytic, lithophytic or terrestrial plants, or rarely leafless saprophytes. All are sympodial evergreen herbs. Some species have thin stems but in most species the stems are modified as pseudobulbs. When present, there are from three to twelve leaves arrange in two ranks and last for several years. The leaf bases remain after the leaf has withered, forming a sheath around the pseudobulb. The flowers are arranged on an unbranched flowering stem which arises from the base of the pseudobulb or rarely from a leaf axil. The sepals and petals are usually thin and fleshy, free from, and more or less similar to each other. The labellum (as in other orchids, a highly modified third petal) is significantly different from the other petals and sepals. It is sometimes hinged to the column, or otherwise fused to it. The labellum has three lobes, the side lobes erect, sometimes surrounding the column and the middle lobe often curving downwards. After pollination a glabrous capsule containing many light coloured seeds is produced.

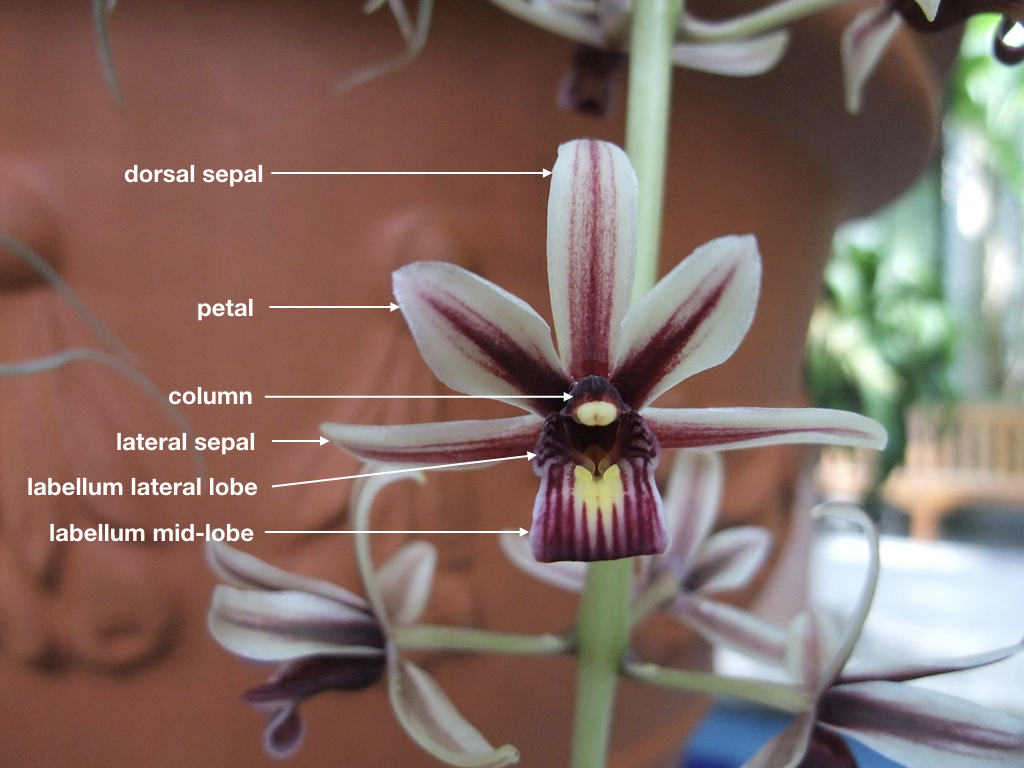
Labelled image of Cymbidium aloifolium

== Taxonomy and naming ==
The genus Cymbidium was first formally described in 1799 by Olof Swartz who published the description in Nova acta Regiae Societatis Scientiarum Upsaliensis. The genus name Cymbidium means 'little boat-shape', referring to the labellum.

In 1848 Blume raised the genus Cyperorchis in Fedde's Repertorium Specierum Novarum Regni Vegetabilis and moved 19 species and 26 hybrids previously included in Cymbidium to the new genus. In 1984 Christopher Seth and Phillip Cribb divided the genus into three subgenera Cyperorchis, Jensoa, and Cymbidium and each subgenus into sections. In 1988, Dupuy and Cribb modified the sections. The three subgenera were confirmed by molecular phylogeny, however the sections did not show monophyly.

=== Species ===
The following is a list of Cymbidium species accepted by Plants of the World Online as of April 2026 separated into subgenera:

==== Subgenus Cymbidium ====
Plants in this subgenus have two pollinia, each deeply cleft with callus ridges

Section	Image	Name	Distribution	Elevation (m)
Section Cymbidium		Cymbidium aloifolium (L.) Sw. 1799	Guangdong, Hong Kong, China; Bangladesh; eastern Himalayas; Assam. India and Andaman Islands; Nepal; Sri Lanka; Myanmar; Thailand; Laos; Cambodia; Vietnam; Malaysia; Java and Sumatra	0–1,500 metres (0–4,921 ft)
Section Cymbidium		Cymbidium atropurpureum (Lindl.) Rolfe 1903	Thailand, Central Malaysia, Vietnam, Borneo, Sumatra and the Philippines	1,630 metres (5,350 ft)
Section Cymbidium		Cymbidium bicolor Lindl. 1833	Southern China, Vietnam, Peninsular Malaysia, Borneo, Sulawesi, Java, Sumatra and the Philippines	800–1,100 metres (2,600–3,600 ft)
Section Cymbidium		Cymbidium crassifolium Herb. 1838	Assam, Bangladesh, Cambodia, China South-Central, China Southeast, East Himalaya, Hainan, India, Laos, Myanmar, Nepal, Thailand, Vietnam	100–1,600 metres (330–5,250 ft)
Section Cymbidium		Cymbidium finlaysonianum Wall. ex Lindl. 1833	Indo-China to Malaysia (Malaya, Sumatra) and on to the Philippines	0–1,200 metres (0–3,937 ft)
Section Cymbidium		Cymbidium puerense Z.J.Liu & S.R.Lan 2018	China (Yunnan)	1,000–2,000 metres (3,300–6,600 ft)
Section Cymbidium		Cymbidium rectum Ridl. 1920	S. Thailand, Malaysia, N. Borneo(Sabah)	450–800 metres (1,480–2,620 ft)
Section Austrocymbidium Schltr. 1924		Cymbidium canaliculatum R.Br. 1810	N. & E. Australia	5–900 metres (16–2,953 ft)
Section Austrocymbidium Schltr. 1924		Cymbidium chloranthum Lindl. 1843	Taiwan, Malaysia, Sumatra, Borneo and Java	300–1,500 metres (980–4,920 ft)
Section Austrocymbidium Schltr. 1924		Cymbidium madidum Lindl. 1840	eastern Australia	0–1,300 metres (0–4,265 ft)
Section Austrocymbidium Schltr. 1924		Cymbidium suave R.Br. 1810	E. Australia	0–1,350 metres (0–4,429 ft)
Section Himantophyllum Schltr. 1924		Cymbidium dayanum Rchb.f 1869	Assam, India; eastern Himalayas; Sikkim; Thailand; Cambodia; Taiwan, Fujian, Guangdong, Guangxi, Hainan, Yunnan, China; Vietnam; Borneo; Malaysia; the Philippines; Sulawesi; Sumatra; Ryukyu Islands and Japan	300–1,600 metres (980–5,250 ft)
Section Himantophyllum Schltr. 1924		Cymbidium lii M.Z.Huang, J.M.Yin & G.S.Yang 2017	Hainan China	800–1,000 metres (2,600–3,300 ft)
Section Himantophyllum Schltr. 1924		Cymbidium repens Aver. & Q.T.Phan 2016	Hoa Binh, Vietnam	400–600 metres (1,300–2,000 ft)
Section Himantophyllum Schltr. 1924		Cymbidium viride Sanjeet Kumar 2020	Assam (Manipur)	616 metres (2,021 ft)
Section Floribundum Seth & Cribb 1984		Cymbidium dianlan H.He 2019	Yunnan	1,200–1,400 metres (3,900–4,600 ft)
Section Floribundum Seth & Cribb 1984		Cymbidium elongatum J.J. Wood, Du Puy & Shim 1988	Borneo(Sarawak and Sabah)	1,200–2,300 metres (3,900–7,500 ft)
Section Floribundum Seth & Cribb 1984		Cymbidium floribundum (Rolfe) Y.S. Wu & S.C. Chen 1980	Yunnan China, Taiwan, and Vietnam	400–3,300 metres (1,300–10,800 ft)
Section Floribundum Seth & Cribb 1984		Cymbidium hartinahianum J.B.Comber & Nasution 1978	N. Sumatra	1,700 to 2,700 metres (5,600 to 8,900 ft)
Section Floribundum Seth & Cribb 1984		Cymbidium suavissimum Sander ex C.H.Curtis 1928	Myanmar, Guizhou and Yunnan China and Vietnam	700 to 1,100 metres (2,300 to 3,600 ft)
Section Floribundum Seth & Cribb 1984		Cymbidium viride Kumar 2018	Assam	616–768 metres (2,021–2,520 ft)
Section Bigibbarium Schltr. 1924		Cymbidium devonianum Paxton 1843	Assam and Meghalaya India, China(Yunnan), Nepal, Bhutan, Myanmar, Thailand, Laos, and Vietnam	1,450–2,200 metres (4,760–7,220 ft)

==== Subgenus Cyperorchis ====
Plants in subgenus Cyberorchis have lips fused at the base to the base of the column.

Section	Image	Name	Distribution	Elevation (m)
Section Annamaea Hunt 1970		Cymbidium erythrostylum Rolfe 1905	Vietnam	1,500 metres (4,900 ft)
Section Annamaea Hunt 1970		Cymbidium wenshanense Y.S.Wu & F.Y.Liu 1990	Yunnan, China and northern Vietnam	1,000–1,500 metres (3,300–4,900 ft)
Section Cyperorchis Hunt 1970		Cymbidium codonanthum Yuting Jiang, Liang Ma & S.Chen 2020	Yunnan, China	1,600–1,800 metres (5,200–5,900 ft)
Section Cyperorchis Hunt 1970		Cymbidium cochleare Lindl. 1858	Taiwan; Assam, Sikkim, India; Bhutan; Myanmar	300–1,600 metres (980–5,250 ft)
Section Cyperorchis Hunt 1970		Cymbidium elegans Lindl. 1828	Yunnan, Xizang, China; Assam, India, eastern Himalayas, Nepal, Bhutan, Sikkim, and Myanmar.	1,500–2,500 metres (4,900–8,200 ft)
Section Cyperorchis Hunt 1970		Cymbidium sigmoideum J.J.Sm. 1907	Malaysia, Borneo, Java and Sumatra	800–1,700 metres (2,600–5,600 ft)
Section Cyperorchis Hunt 1970		Cymbidium wadae T.Yukawa 2002	Thailand	
Section Cyperorchis Hunt 1970		Cymbidium whiteae King & Pantl. 1898	India (Sikkim)	1,500–2,000 metres (4,900–6,600 ft)
Section Eburnea(Bl.)Seth & Cribb 1984		Cymbidium banaense Gagnep. 1951	Vietnam	1,400 metres (4,600 ft)
Section Eburnea(Bl.)Seth & Cribb 1984		Cymbidium changningense Z.J.Liu & S.C.Chen 2005	Yunnan, China	1,700 metres (5,600 ft)
Section Eburnea(Bl.)Seth & Cribb 1984		Cymbidium concinnum Z.J.Liu & S.C.Chen 2006	Yunnan, China	2,300 metres (7,500 ft)
Section Eburnea(Bl.)Seth & Cribb 1984		Cymbidium eburneum Lindl. 1847	Assam India, eastern Himalayas, Nepal, Myanmar, Yunnan China and Vietnam	300–2,000 metres (980–6,560 ft)
Section Eburnea(Bl.)Seth & Cribb 1984		Cymbidium mastersii Griff. ex Lindl. 1845	Assam India, Bhutan, Myanmar, northern Thailand and China	900–2,400 metres (3,000–7,900 ft)
Section Eburnea(Bl.)Seth & Cribb 1984		Cymbidium jiangchengense Ying L.Peng, S.R.Lan & Z.J.Liu 2019	Yunnan, China	1,200–1,400 metres (3,900–4,600 ft)
Section Eburnea(Bl.)Seth & Cribb 1984		Cymbidium maguanense F.Y.Liu 1996	Southeastern Yunnan, China	1,000–1,800 metres (3,300–5,900 ft)
Section Eburnea(Bl.)Seth & Cribb 1984		Cymbidium parishii Rchb. f. 1874	Myanmar	1,500–1,650 metres (4,920–5,410 ft)
Section Eburnea(Bl.)Seth & Cribb 1984		Cymbidium roseum J.J.Sm. 1905	Malayasian peninsula, Java and Sumatra	1,450–2,400 metres (4,760–7,870 ft)
Section Eburnea(Bl.)Seth & Cribb 1984		Cymbidium weishanense X.Yu & Z.J.Liu 2021	China (Yunnan)	800 metres (2,600 ft)
Section Iridorchis (Bl.)Hunt 1970		Cymbidium erythraeum Lindl. 1859	Kumaon, Sikkim, and Assam states of India; Nepal; Bhutan; Myanmar; Yunnan, Sichuan, and Xizang China; and Vietnam	1,000–2,800 metres (3,300–9,200 ft)
Section Iridorchis (Bl.)Hunt 1970		Cymbidium daweishanense G.Q.Zhang & Z.J.Liu 2018	Yunnan, China	1,200–1,400 metres (3,900–4,600 ft)
Section Iridorchis (Bl.)Hunt 1970		Cymbidium gaoligongense Z.J.Liu & J.Yong Zhang 2003	Yunnan, China	1,500 metres (4,900 ft)
Section Iridorchis (Bl.)Hunt 1970		Cymbidium hookerianum Rchb.f.	Nepal, Bhutan, Sikkim & Assam India, and Xizang China	1,500–2,600 metres (4,900–8,500 ft)
Section Iridorchis (Bl.)Hunt 1970		Cymbidium insigne Rolfe 1904	Thailand, Vietnam and Hainan China	1,000–2,600 metres (3,300–8,500 ft)
Section Iridorchis (Bl.)Hunt 1970		Cymbidium iridioides D. Don 1825	Xizang, Guizhou, Sichuan, and Yunnan provinces of China; Kumaon, Assam, Sikkim, and Meghalaya states of India; Bhutan; Nepal; Myanmar; and Vietnam	900–2,800 metres (3,000–9,200 ft)
Section Iridorchis (Bl.)Hunt 1970		Cymbidium lowianum (Rchb. f.) Rchb. f. 1879	Burma, Thailand, Yunnan China and Vietnam	1,300–2,200 metres (4,300–7,200 ft)
Section Iridorchis (Bl.)Hunt 1970		Cymbidium motuoense W.Q.Hu, Qinghai Zhang & Z.J.Liu 2021	China (SE Tibet)	2,760 metres (9,060 ft)
Section Iridorchis (Bl.)Hunt 1970		Cymbidium sanderae Sander ex Rolfe 1904	Vietnam	1,400–1,500 metres (4,600–4,900 ft)
Section Iridorchis (Bl.)Hunt 1970		Cymbidium seidenfadenii (P.J.Cribb & Du Puy) P.J.Cribb 2014	Thailand	1,000–2,600 metres (3,300–8,500 ft)
Section Iridorchis (Bl.)Hunt 1970		Cymbidium schroederi Rolfe 1905	Yunnan China, Vietnam	1,350–1,700 metres (4,430–5,580 ft)
Section Iridorchis (Bl.)Hunt 1970		Cymbidium sichuanicum Z.J.Liu & S.C.Chen 2006	Sichuan, China	1,200–1,600 metres (3,900–5,200 ft)
Section Iridorchis (Bl.)Hunt 1970		Cymbidium tracyanum Rolfe 1890	China, Thailand and Myanmar	1,200–1,900 metres (3,900–6,200 ft)
Section Iridorchis (Bl.)Hunt 1970		Cymbidium wilsonii (Rolfe ex De Cock) Rolfe 1904	Southern Yunnan, China and Vietnam	
Section Parishiella (Bl.)Hunt 1970		Cymbidium tigrinum Parish ex Hook. f. 1864	West Yunnan China, Myanmar and Assam India	1,000–2,700 metres (3,300–8,900 ft)

==== Subgenus Jensoa ====
Plants in this subgenus have four pollinia, in two unequal pairs; lips attached to the base of the column,

Section	Image	Name	Distribution	Elevation (m)
Section Axillaria Du Puy & Cribb 1988		Cymbidium cyperifolium Lindl. 1833	Nepal, Bhutan, India, Myanmar, Thailand, Cambodia, Vietnam, the Philippines, Guangdong, Hainan, Guangxi, Guizhou, and Yunnan China	600–1,650 metres (1,970–5,410 ft)
Section Axillaria Du Puy & Cribb 1988		Cymbidium shidianense G.Z.Chen, G.Q.Zhang & L.J.Chen 2019	China (Yunnan)	1,200 metres (3,900 ft)
Section Borneense Du Puy & Cribb 1988		Cymbidium aliciae Quisumb 1940	Sulawesi and the Philippines (Luzon, Negro Islands and Nueva Vazcaya)	300–2,750 metres (980–9,020 ft)
Section Borneense Du Puy & Cribb 1988		Cymbidium borneense J.J. Wood 1983	Borneo(Sarawak and Sabah)	100–1,300 metres (330–4,270 ft)
Section Geocymbidium Schltr. 1924		Cymbidium biflorens D.Y.Zhang, S.R.Lan & Z.J.Liu 2020	Yunnan China	
Section Geocymbidium Schltr. 1924		Cymbidium lancifolium Hook. 1823	Nepal, Bhutan, Sikkim, China, Korea, Japan, Ryukyu Islands, Taiwan, Myanmar, Thailand, Malaysia, Laos, Cambodia, Vietnam, Borneo, Java Moluccas, Sulawesi, Sumatra and New Guinea	200–2,300 metres (660–7,550 ft)
Section Geocymbidium Schltr. 1924		Cymbidium recurvatum Z.J.Liu, S.C.Chen & P.J.Cribb 2009	Yunnan China	1,700 metres (5,600 ft)
Section Jensoa Du Puy & Cribb 1988		Cymbidium acuminatum M.A.Clem. & D.L.Jones 1996	New Guinea	450–1,300 metres (1,480–4,270 ft)
Section Jensoa Du Puy & Cribb 1988		Cymbidium defoliatum Y.S.Wu & S.C.Chen 1991	Fujian, Guizhou, Yunnan and Sichuan provinces of China	1,000–1,100 metres (3,300–3,600 ft)
Section Jensoa Du Puy & Cribb 1988		Cymbidium ensifolium [L]Swartz 1799	Japan, China, Vietnam, Cambodia, Laos, Hong Kong to Sumatra and Java	0–1,500 metres (0–4,921 ft)
Section Jensoa Du Puy & Cribb 1988		Cymbidium formosanum Hayata 1911	Taiwan	
Section Jensoa Du Puy & Cribb 1988		Cymbidium goeringii [Rchb.f]Rchb.f 1864	India, Bhutan, China, Taiwan, Ryukyu Islands, Japan and Korea	300–3,000 metres (980–9,840 ft)
Section Jensoa Du Puy & Cribb 1988		Cymbidium haematodes Lindl. 1833	Hainan and Yunnan provinces of China, India, Sri Lanka, Thailand, Laos, Indonesia and New Guinea	500–1,900 metres (1,600–6,200 ft)
Section Jensoa Du Puy & Cribb 1988		Cymbidium induratifolium Z.J.Liu & J.N.Zhang 1998	Vietnam	
Section Jensoa Du Puy & Cribb 1988		Cymbidium kanran Makino 1902	Taiwan, Guangdong, Gunagxi, Yunnan, Sichuan, Guizhou, and Hainan Island provinces of China; Honshu and the Ryukyu Islands, Japan; and South Korea	400–2,500 metres (1,300–8,200 ft)
Section Jensoa Du Puy & Cribb 1988		Cymbidium longipes Z.J.Liu & J.N.Zhang 1998	Vietnam	
Section Jensoa Du Puy & Cribb 1988		Cymbidium micranthum Z.J.Liu & S.C.Chen 2004	Yunnan, China	1,500 metres (4,900 ft)
Section Jensoa Du Puy & Cribb 1988		Cymbidium munronianum King & Pantl. 1895	Assam India	
Section Jensoa Du Puy & Cribb 1988		Cymbidium omeiense Y.S.Wu & S.C.Chen 1966	Sichuan China	
Section Jensoa Du Puy & Cribb 1988		Cymbidium qiubeiense K.M.Feng & H.Li 1980	Yunnan and Guangxi provinces of China	700–1,800 metres (2,300–5,900 ft)
Section Jensoa Du Puy & Cribb 1988		Cymbidium sinense (Andrews) Willd.1805	Guangdong, Hainan，Taiwan, Fujian, Jiangxi, Southern Sichuan, Guizhou, and Yunnan provinces of China and Northern Vietnam.	0–2,000 metres (0–6,562 ft)
Section Jensoa Du Puy & Cribb 1988		Cymbidium tamphianum Aver. 2018	Lam Dong, Vietnam	1,600 metres (5,200 ft)
Section Jensoa Du Puy & Cribb 1988		Cymbidium sangii Aver. & V.C.Nguyen 2023	Lam Dong, Vietnam	800–900 metres (2,600–3,000 ft)
Section Jensoa Du Puy & Cribb 1988		Cymbidium xichouense Xin Y.Xu, C.C.Ding & S.R.Lan	Yunnan China	1,400 metres (4,600 ft)
Section Nanula Du Puy & Cribb 1988		Cymbidium atrolabium X.Y.Liao, S.R.Lan & Z.J.Liy 2019	Yunnan China	2,300 metres (7,500 ft)
Section Nanula Du Puy & Cribb 1988		Cymbidium brevifolium Z.Zhou, S.R.Lan & Z.J.Liu 2020	Hubei China	2,300 metres (7,500 ft)
Section Nanula Du Puy & Cribb 1988		Cymbidium faberi Rolfe 1896	Anhui, Fujian, Gansu, Guangdong, Guangxi, Guizhou, Henan, Hubei, Hunan, Jiangxi, Shaanxi, Sichuan, Xizang, Yunnan, Zhejiang provinces of China; Taiwan;	700–3,000 metres (2,300–9,800 ft)
Section Nanula Du Puy & Cribb 1988		Cymbidium nanulum Y.S.Wu & S.C.Chen 2017	Yunnan, Guizhou, Hainan provinces of China	
Section Nanula Du Puy & Cribb 1988		Cymbidium purpureisepalum M.J.Zhu & S.R.Lan 2022	Yunnan China	1,200 metres (3,900 ft)
Section Nanula Du Puy & Cribb 1988		Cymbidium serratum Schltr. 1919	Guizhou, Hubei, Sichuan, Yunnan provinces of China; Taiwan	1,000–3,000 metres (3,300–9,800 ft)
Section Nanula Du Puy & Cribb 1988		Cymbidium ledinhhienii Aver., Vuong et V.C. Nguyen 2024	Vietnam (Dak Lak)	300–400 metres (980–1,310 ft)
Section Nanula Du Puy & Cribb 1988		Cymbidium sungwookii Aver., Vuong et V.C. Nguyen 2024	Vietnam (Binh Dinh)	500–600 metres (1,600–2,000 ft)
Section Nanula Du Puy & Cribb 1988		Cymbidium teretipetiolatum Z.J.Liu & S.C.Chen 2002	Yunnan China	1,000 metres (3,300 ft)
Section Nanula Du Puy & Cribb 1988		Cymbidium tortisepalum Fukuy. 1934	Guizhou, Sichuan, Yunnan provinces of China; Taiwan	800–2,500 metres (2,600–8,200 ft)
Section Pachyrhizanthe Schltr. 1924		Cymbidium macrorhizon Lindl. 1833	Pakistan, the Chinese Himalayas, Assam, the eastern Himalayas, Nepal, Bhutan, Myanmar, Thailand, Laos, Vietnam, Taiwan, the Ryukyu Islands and Korea	700–1,500 metres (2,300–4,900 ft)
Section Pachyrhizanthe Schltr. 1924		Cymbidium hengbungense A.N. Rao, K. Chowlu, H.B. Sharma, K.S. Thithila & D.S. Thokchom 2016	India (Manipur)	1,200 metres (3,900 ft)

=== Natural Hybrids ===
- Cymbidium × ballianum Rolfe
- Cymbidium × baoshanense F.Y.Liu & Perner
- Cymbidium × dilatatiphyllum J.M.H.Shaw
- Cymbidium × florinda Rolfe
- Cymbidium × gammieanum King & Pantl.
- Cymbidium × glebelandense Rolfe
- Cymbidium × hillii F.Muell. ex Regel
- Cymbidium × monanthum J.M.H.Shaw
- Cymbidium × nishiuchianum Makino ex J.M.H.Shaw
- Cymbidium × nomachianum T.Yukawa & Nob.Tanaka
- Cymbidium × nujiangense X.P.Zhou, S.P.Lei & Z.J.Liu
- Cymbidium × oblancifolium Z.J.Liu & S.C.Chen
- Cymbidium × purpuratum L.J.Chen, Li.Q.Li & Z.J.Liu
- Cymbidium × rosefieldense Rolfe
- Cymbidium × woodlandense Rolfe

== Distribution ==
This genus is distributed in tropical and subtropical Asia (such as northern India, China, Japan, Malaysia, the Philippines, and Borneo) and Australia. The large flowering species from which the large flowering hybrids are derived usually grow at low altitudes, while short leaved species, from which compact hybrids with small to medium size flowers are derived, are high altitudes lithophytes and epiphytes.

== Uses ==
=== Use in horticulture ===
Cymbidium (abbreviated Cym. in the horticultural trade) orchids are among the oldest horticultural orchids in the world and were mentioned in a manuscript from the Jin dynasty from about 200s CE and by Confucius. Today they are among the most popular orchid genera in cultivation. They have decorative flowers spikes and are one of the least demanding indoor orchids. To flower well they need a distinct difference between day and night temperatures in late summer. Plants need to remain outside in autumn until night temperatures drop to near 0 °C (32 °F).

Cymbidiums have few pests or diseases but can be affected by aphids, spider mites and viral diseases.

=== Use in cooking ===
The species Cymbidium hookerianum is considered a delicacy in Bhutan, where it is traditionally cooked in a spicy curry or stew and called "olatshe" or "olachoto".
