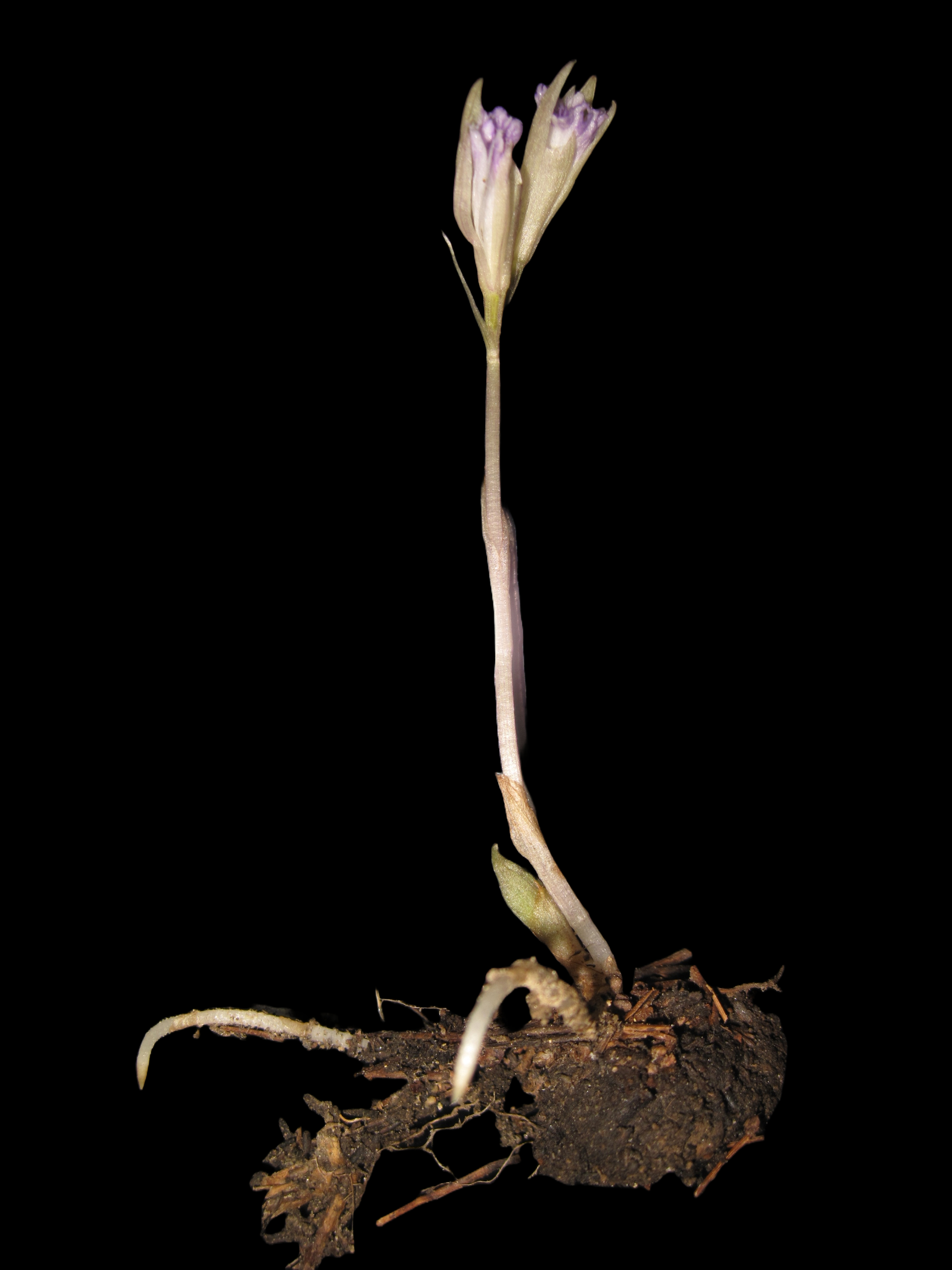
- Plant of Nervilia simplex var. himachalensis

Scientific classification
- Kingdom: Plantae
- Clade: Tracheophytes
- Clade: Angiosperms
- Clade: Monocots
- Order: Asparagales
- Family: Orchidaceae
- Subfamily: Epidendroideae
- Genus: Nervilia
- Species: N. simplex
- Variety: N. s. var. himachalensis

Trinomial name
- Nervilia simplex var. himachalensis R.Chandra & K.Gogoi

= Nervilia simplex var. himachalensis =

Twin Nervilia

Variety of orchid from Himachal Pradesh, India

Nervilia simplex var. himachalensis is a variety of the orchid Nervilia simplex from the Northwestern Himalayas, Himachal Pradesh, India.

== Taxonomy and naming ==
Nervilia simplex var. himachalensis was first formally described in 2024 by Rimjhim Chandra and Khyanjeet Gogoi, who published the description in The Journal of the Orchid Society of India.

The specific epiphet is a metonym after the Himachal Pradesh, where the type specimens were collected.

== Description ==
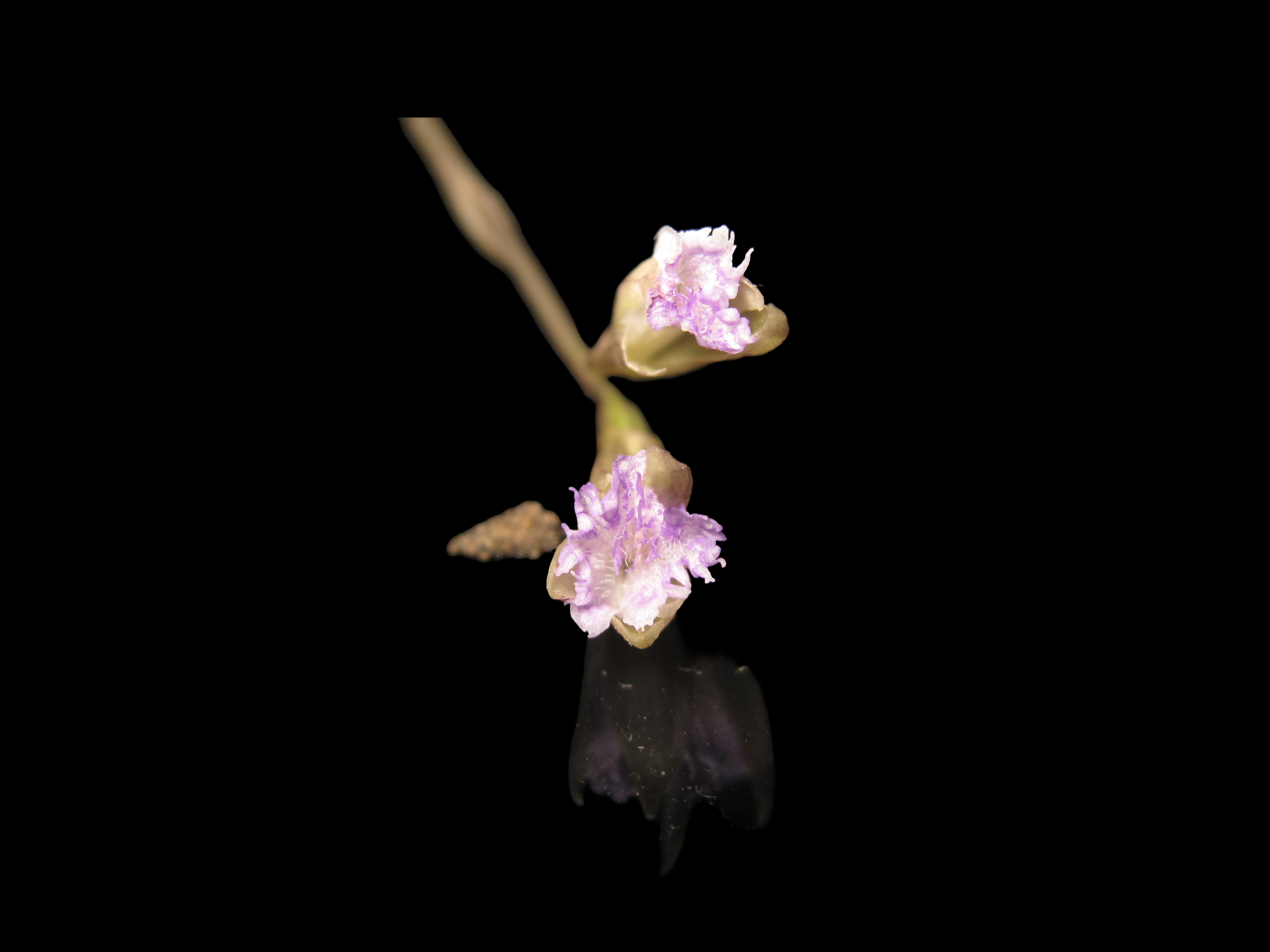
Flower of Nervilia simplex var. himachalensis

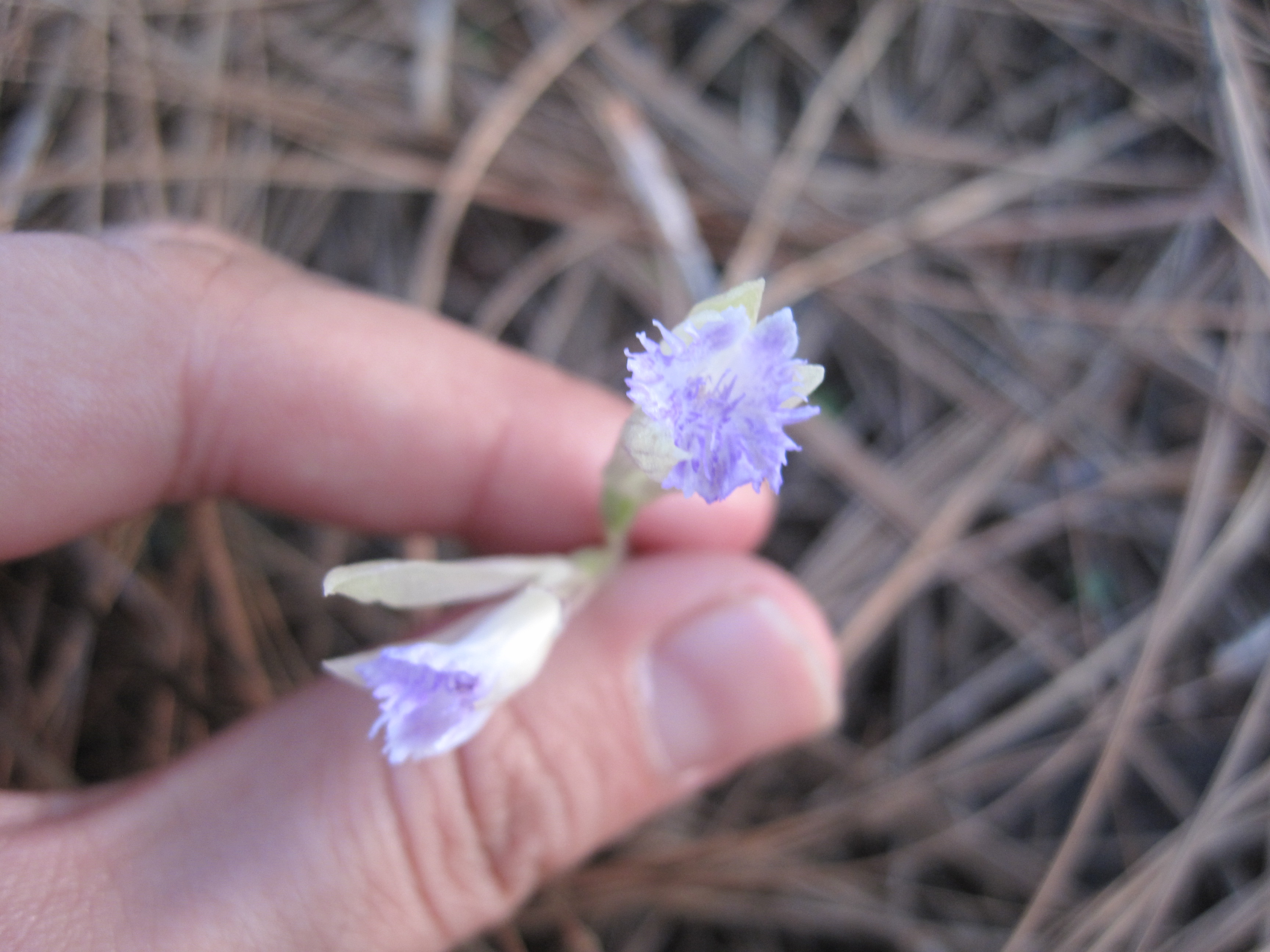
Flower of Nervilia simplex var. himachalensis in habitat

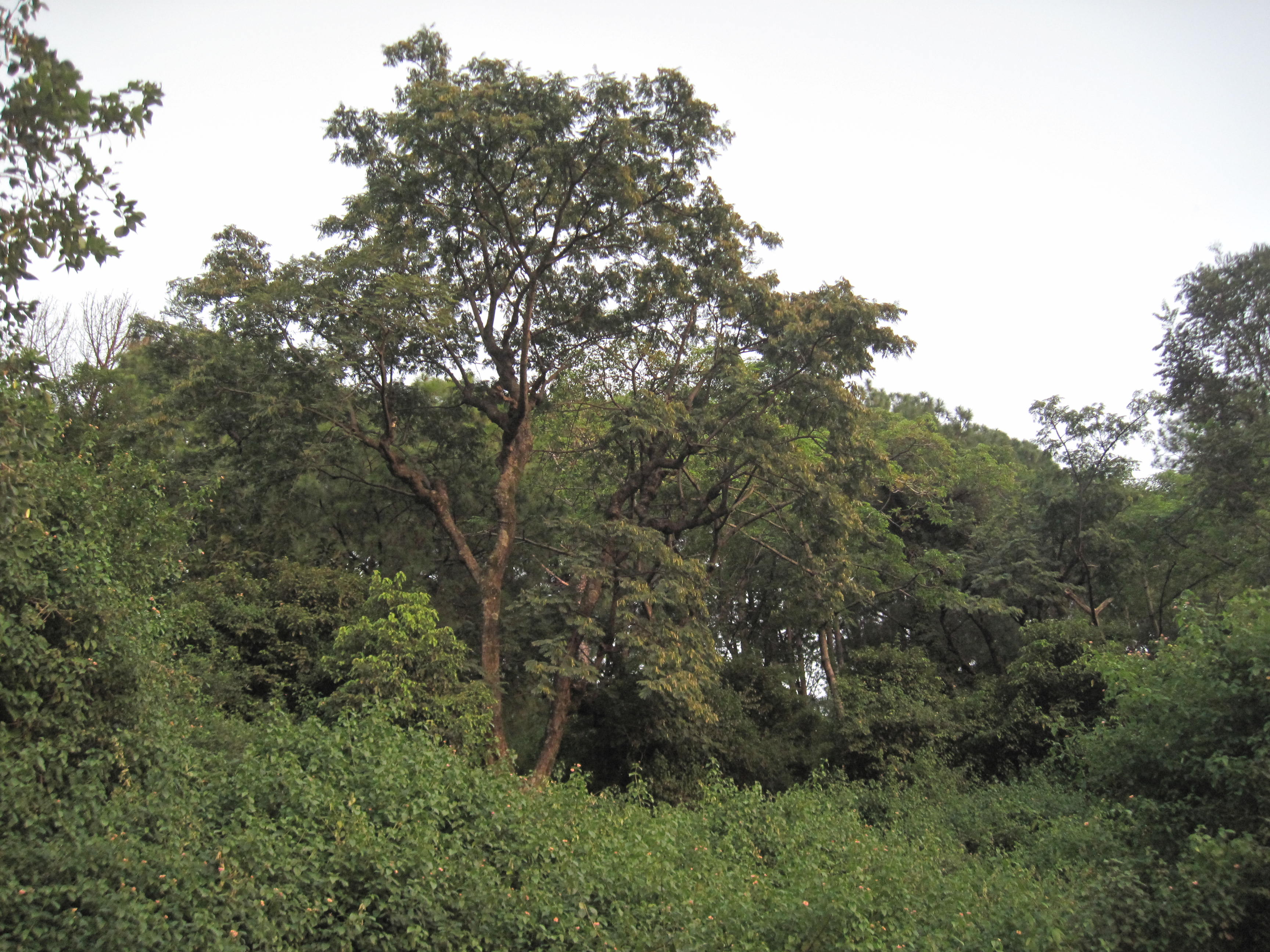
Habitat at the type locality

Nervilia simplex var. himachalensis is a ground-dwelling plant with somewhat round to oval tubers measuring 2.0–2.5 cm (0.79–0.98 in) in length and 1.8–2.0 cm (0.71–0.79 in) in width. The leaf, about 2–5 cm (0.79–1.97 in) long and 2–3 cm (0.79–1.18 in) wide, is pale green on the side facing away from the stem and darker green on the other side, with fine white branched veins, and is heart-shaped and slightly fleshy. The side facing the stem is sparsely bristly throughout, with 11–13 main veins. The leaf is wavy-edged with a pointed tip and an erect leaf stalk which is 2–6 cm (0.79–2.36 in) long. The inflorescence, consisting of two flowers, is held erect, and is 4–7 cm (1.6–2.8 in) long, circular in cross section, slender, and hairless. The sheath below the base of the flower is about 1.3 cm (0.51 in) across. The peduncle is pale green, with 3–4 tube-shaped stem-clasping sheaths. The flower bract is narrow, papillose-shaped to tapering at the tip. The individual flower is held erect and is partly closed, measuring 1.5–2.7 cm (0.59–1.06 in) across. The sepal is pale green with faint grey lines, narrow in shape and with a pointed or tapering tip. The dorsal sepal is about 2 cm (0.79 in) long and 0.2 cm (0.079 in) wide with a pointed tip, while the lateral sepal is 1.5 cm (0.59 in) long and 0.3 cm (0.12 in) wide. The petals are creamy white and purple from the tip, narrow in shape, 1.5–2 cm (0.59–0.79 in) long and 0.2–0.4 cm (0.079–0.157 in) wide. The lip is strongly reflexed above the middle and is white tinged, purple fringed and white at base, about 2 cm (0.79 in) long and 0.6 cm (0.24 in) wide when closed, lacking spurs. It is simple or 3 lobed with side margins erect and margins at the tip irregularly fringed, about 1.5 cm (0.59 in) long and 0.6 cm (0.24 in) wide. The side margins are erect and loosely enclose the column, while the margin at the tip is irregularly jagged or fringed; side lobes, when present, are small and somewhat round; the disk is papillose, with 3 horizontal ridges extending from near the base almost to the tip. The capsule is 2 cm long.

== Distribution and habitat ==
Nervilia simplex var. himachalensis occurs in the forests of the northwestern Himalayan range of Himachal Pradesh, India. It grows on the forest floor covered with dry pine needles from Pinus roxburghii, at an altitude around 1,500 metres (4,900 feet).

== Etymology ==
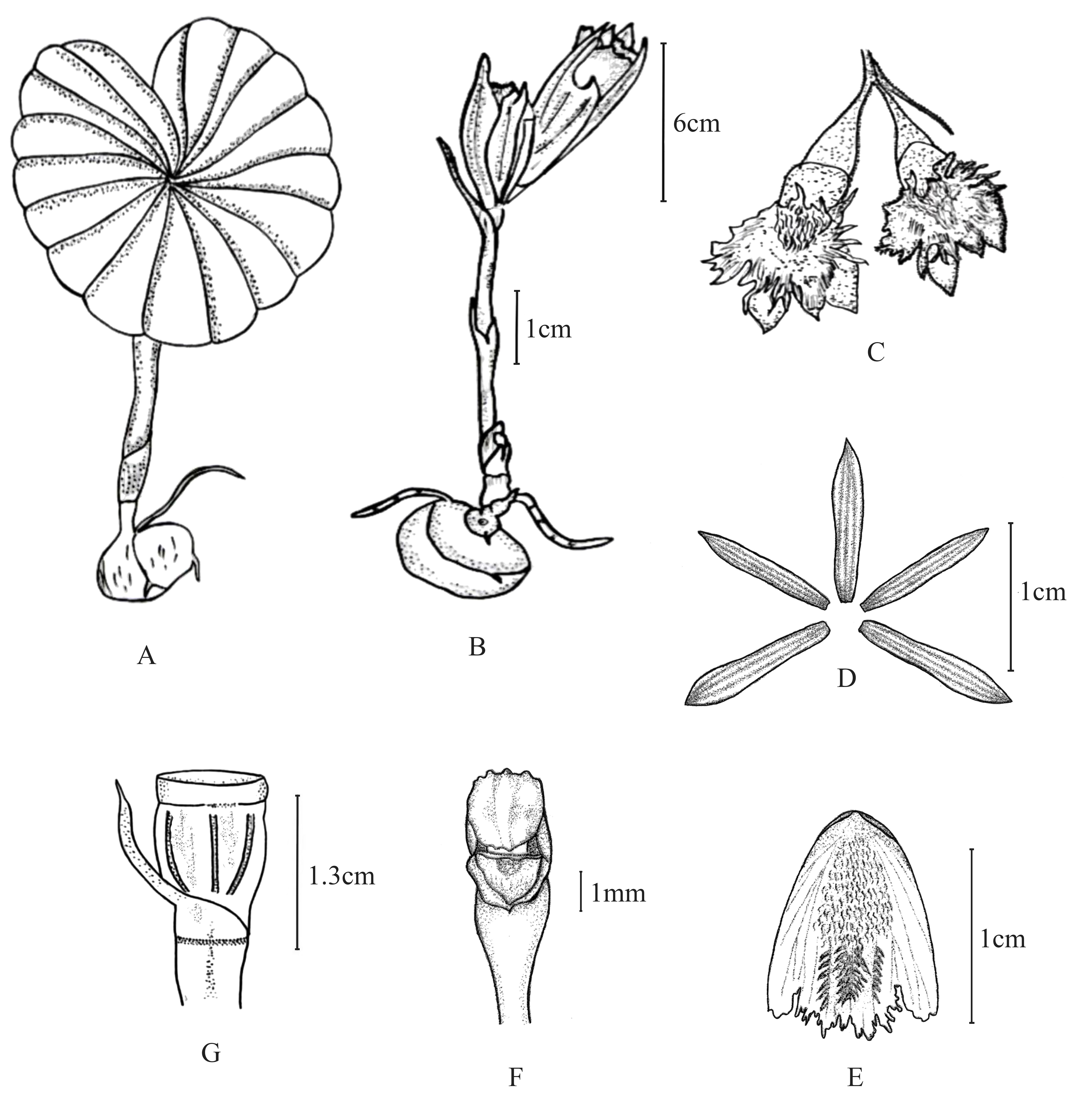
Illustration of Nervilia simplex var. himachalensis

The specific epithet refers to the Himachal Pradesh, India from where the plant was collected.

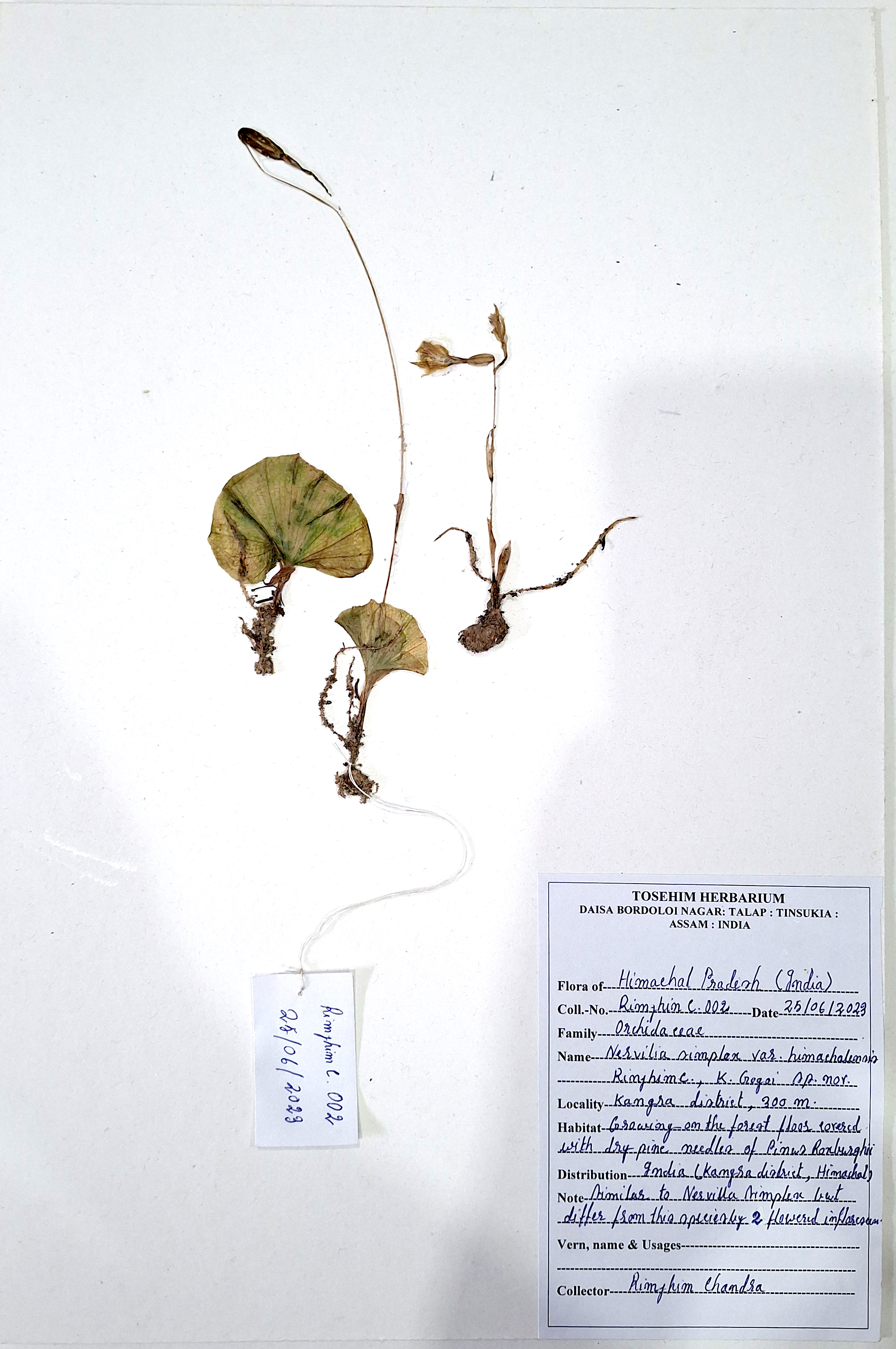
Holotype of Nervilia simplex var. himachalensis
