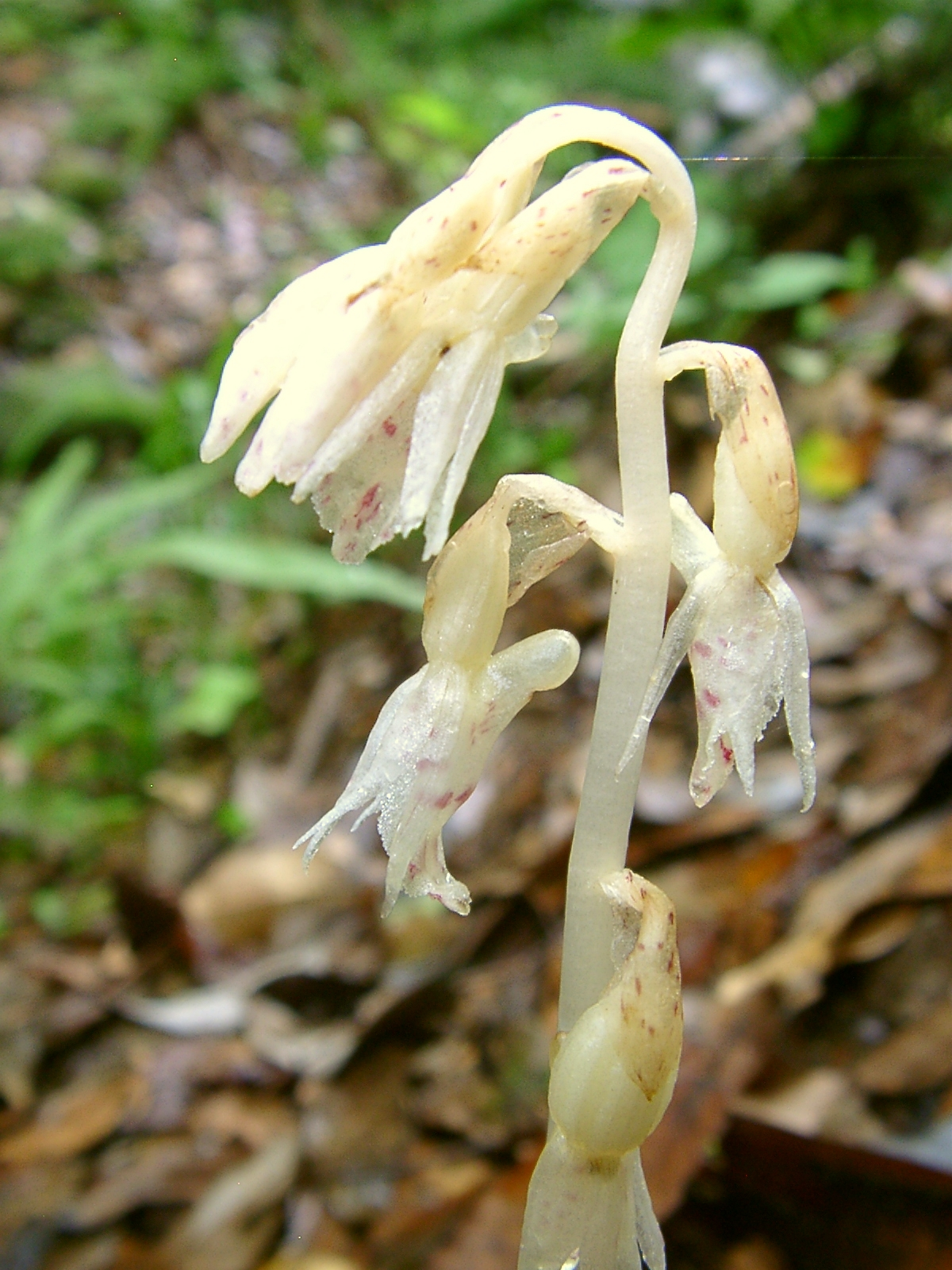
- Growing near Hiratsuka-city, Japan

Scientific classification
- Kingdom: Plantae
- Clade: Tracheophytes
- Clade: Angiosperms
- Clade: Monocots
- Order: Asparagales
- Family: Orchidaceae
- Subfamily: Epidendroideae
- Genus: Epipogium
- Species: E. roseum

Binomial name
- Epipogium roseum (D.Don) Lindl.

Synonyms
- List: Ceratopsis rosea (D.Don) Lindl.; Epipogium africanum Schltr.; Epipogium dentilabellum Ohtani & Shig.Suzuki; Epipogium japonicum Makino; Epipogium kusukusense (Hayata) Schltr.; Epipogium makinoanum Schltr.; Epipogium maknoanum Dockrill orth. var.; Epipogium nutans (Blume) Rchb.f.; Epipogium poneranthum Fukuy.; Epipogium pooncranthum Dockrill orth. var.; Epipogium pooneranthum M.A.Clem. orth. var.; Epipogium sinicum C.L.Tso; Epipogium sp.; Epipogium tuberosum Duthie; Epipogum guilfoylei Rupp nom. inval., pro syn.; Epipogum guilfoylii Benth. nom. inval., pro syn.; Epipogum nutans Rchb.f. orth. var.; Epipogum poneranthum Fukuy. orth. var.; Epipogum roseum Rupp orth. var.; Epipogum tuberosum Duthie orth. var.; Galera kusukusense Dockrill orth. var.; Galera kusukusensis Hayata; Galera nutans Blume; Galera rolfei Hayata; Galera rosea (D.Don) Blume; Gastrodia schinziana Kraenzl.; Limodorum roseum D.Don; Podanthera pallida Wight

= Epipogium roseum =

Ghost orchid

Species of orchid

Epipogium roseum, commonly known as ghost orchid, leafless nodding orchid or 虎舌兰 (hu she lan), is a leafless terrestrial mycotrophic orchid in the family Orchidaceae. It has up to sixteen cream-coloured, yellowish or pinkish flowers with an enlarged ovary on a fleshy hollow flowering stem. This ghost orchid is widely distributed in tropical Africa, Asia, Southeast Asia, New Guinea, Australia and some Pacific Islands.

== Description ==
Epipogium roseum is a leafless, terrestrial mycotrophic herb that has a fleshy underground rhizome and a fleshy, hollow, dull yellow flowering stem 200–600 mm (8–20 in) tall. There are between two and sixteen resupinate cream-coloured, yellowish or pinkish flowers 10–12 mm (0.4–0.5 in) long with an unusually swollen ovary. The sepals are linear to lance-shaped, 8–11 mm (0.3–0.4 in) long, 2–3 mm (0.08–0.1 in) wide and the petals are often slightly shorter and wider. The dorsal sepal and petals are joined at the base and spread weakly. The labellum is egg-shaped, 11–14 mm (0.4–0.6 in) long, 4–5 mm (0.16–0.20 in) wide with a spur at its base. Flowering occurs from December to March in Australia and from April to September in China. The plants appear a few days after the first heavy rains of the wet season and set seed within a few days.

== Taxonomy and naming ==
This ghost orchid was first described in 1857 by David Don who gave it the name Limodorum roseum and published the description in Prodromus florae Nepalensis. In 1857, John Lindley changed the name to Epipogium roseum in the Journal of the Proceedings of the Linnean Society, Botany. The specific epithet (roseum) is a Latin word meaning "rose-coloured".

== Distribution and habitat ==
Epipogium roseum grows in high rainfall habitats, especially rainforest, on decaying wood. It is found in many countries including China, India, Indonesia, Japan, Laos, Malaysia, Nepal, the Philippines, Sri Lanka, Thailand, Vietnam, tropical Africa, New Guinea, Australia and some Pacific islands including the Solomon Islands. In Australia it occurs from the Windsor Tablelands in Queensland to the Macleay River in New South Wales.
