= Stereosandra =

Scientific classification
- Kingdom: Plantae
- Clade: Tracheophytes
- Clade: Angiosperms
- Clade: Monocots
- Order: Asparagales
- Family: Orchidaceae
- Subfamily: Epidendroideae
- Tribe: Nervilieae
- Subtribe: Epipogiinae
- Genus: Stereosandra; Blume
- Species: S. javanica

Binomial name
- Stereosandra javanica Blume

Synonyms
- Stereosandra pendula Kraenzl.; Stereosandra javanica var. papuana J.J.Sm.; Stereosandra koidzumiana Ohwi; Stereosandra liukiuensis Tuyama

Monotypic genus of plant

Stereosandra is a genus of leafless orchids native to Southeast Asia (Thailand, Vietnam, Malaysia, Philippines, Indonesia), the range extending north to Yunnan, Taiwan and the Ryukyu Islands, and also eastward to New Guinea, the Solomon Islands and Samoa. These are myco-heterotrophic orchids, lacking chlorophyll, obtaining nutrients from fungi in the soil instead.

As of June 2014, only one species is recognized: Stereosandra javanica.
