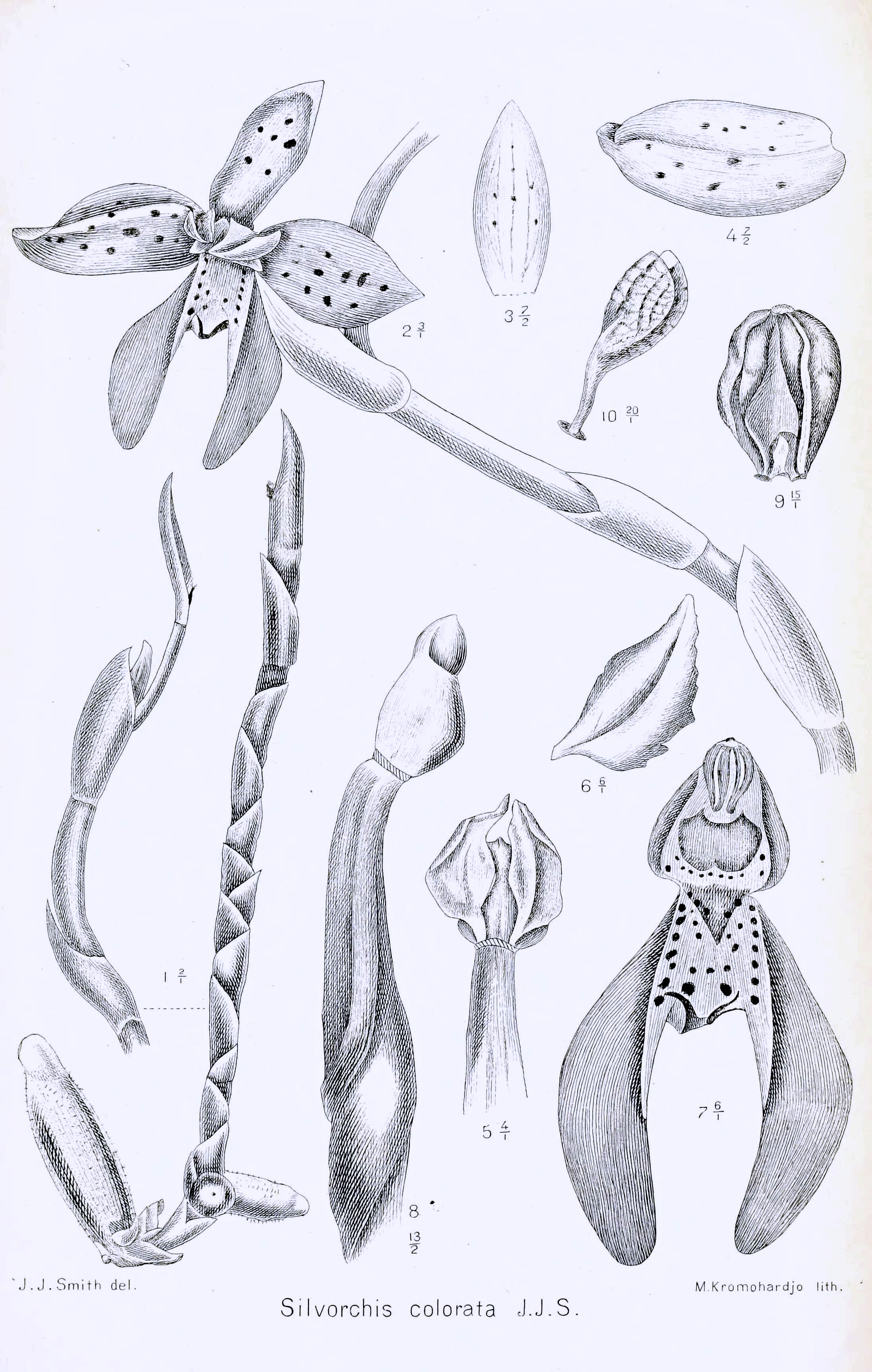

Scientific classification
- Kingdom: Plantae
- Clade: Tracheophytes
- Clade: Angiosperms
- Clade: Monocots
- Order: Asparagales
- Family: Orchidaceae
- Subfamily: Orchidoideae
- Genus: Silvorchis
- Species: S. colorata

Binomial name
- Silvorchis colorata J.J.Sm.

= Silvorchis colorata =

Species of plant

Silvorchis colorata is a species of orchid. It is endemic to Java. This is a holomycotrophic species, completely lacking in chlorophyll.
