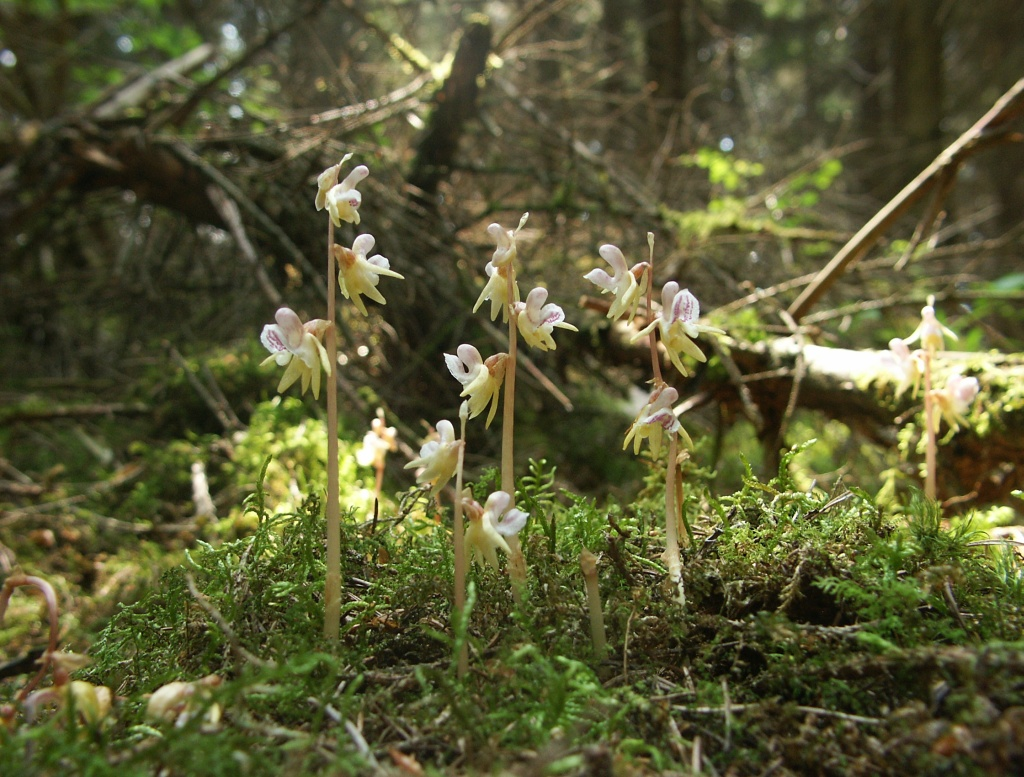
- Habit
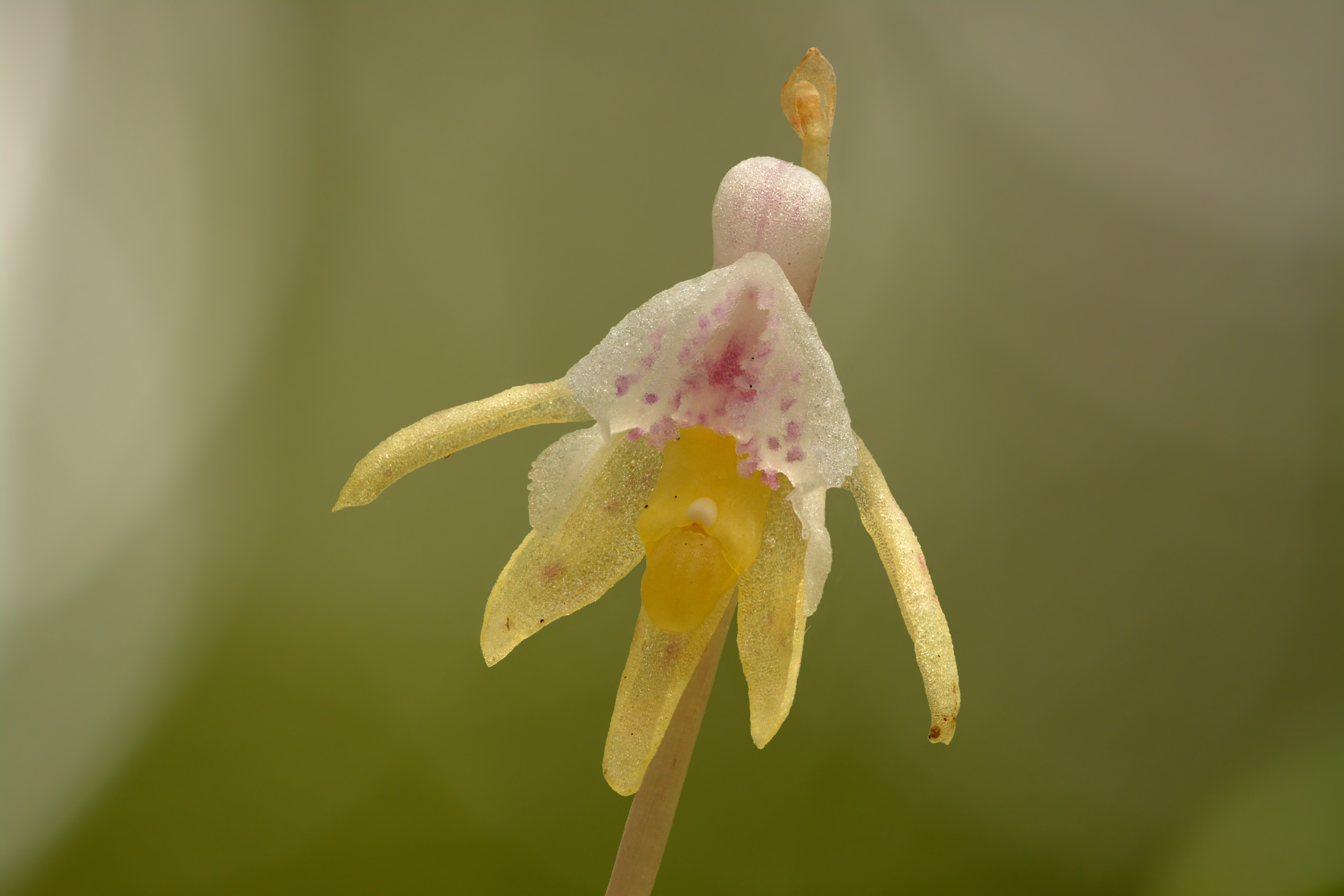
- Ghost orchid flower

Conservation status
- Least Concern (IUCN 3.1)(Europe)

Scientific classification
- Kingdom: Plantae
- Clade: Tracheophytes
- Clade: Angiosperms
- Clade: Monocots
- Order: Asparagales
- Family: Orchidaceae
- Subfamily: Epidendroideae
- Genus: Epipogium
- Species: E. aphyllum

Binomial name
- Epipogium aphyllum Sw.

Synonyms
- Satyrium epipogium L.

= Epipogium aphyllum =

Ghost orchid

Species of flowering plant

Epipogium aphyllum, the ghost orchid, is a hardy mycoheterotrophic orchid lacking chlorophyll. In much of its range, it is a rare representative of family Orchidaceae.

It is famous for its unpredictable appearance; in many localities it has been seen just once. It is found in beech, oak, pine, and spruce forests of Europe and Asia, on base-rich soils. It is a rare and critically endangered plant in Britain; it was believed to be extinct throughout much of its former range, although in 2009 and in 2024 it was re-confirmed, where the plants were believed to have become extinct.

The plants are protected in many locales, and removing the plants from habitat or disturbing the plants, even for scientific study, can be a very serious matter in many jurisdictions. These plants are exceptionally rare and should never be removed from habitat or disturbed.

In 1926 the Welsh botanist Eleanor Vachell was asked by the British Museum to investigate a report of the ghost orchid in England. For many years the Welsh National Herbarium at Amgueddfa Cymru (National Museum of Wales) had only a small rhizome that had been gathered by Vachell on 29 May 1926.

== Biology ==
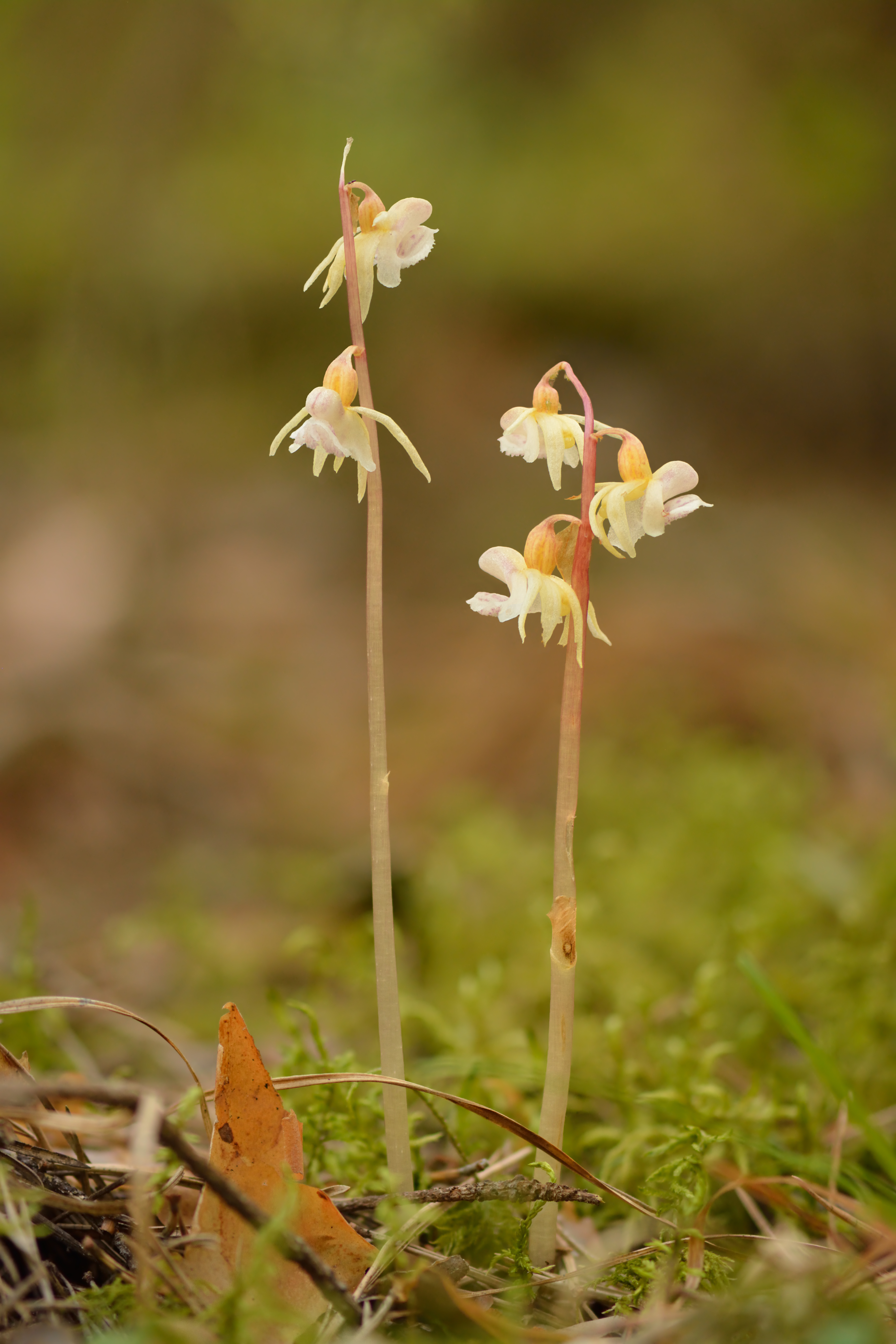

Once thought to be saprophytic, these hardy plants are actually obligate mycoheterotrophs (or epiparasites) that obtain nutrients from mycorrhizal networks involving basidiomycete fungi that are in turn associated with the roots of various species of coniferous trees. They grow from an underground, burrowing stem which lacks chlorophyll and possesses ephemeral leaves that are small scales. The plants only emerge above ground to flower, especially during very wet summers in Western Europe.

These plants harness an array of fungal symbionts across several families, often simultaneously. Analysis of these plants have identified ectomycorrhizal Inocybe species as exclusive symbionts for 75% of the plants in habitat, as well as others (Hebeloma, Xerocomus, Lactarius and Thelephora). The plants also host ascomycete endophytes, which appear to assist the plant in parasitizing some of the plant's basidiomycete symbionts.

The plants defy cultivation outside of laboratory conditions, as they require not only specific fungal symbionts, but also specific host trees with which these mushroom species form mycorrhizal relationships. Large plants of this species can produce a rather stunning woodland display with up to a dozen flower stalks at once bearing 3–4 flowers each growing out of coniferous leaf litter.

The flowers are most likely pollinated by bumblebees; to reproduce, it produces numerous dust-like seeds that are dispersed by the wind over long distances.

Chromosome number is often stated as 2n = 68, though one research article questions whether this value could be for a different Epipogium species.

Researchers discovered in 2016 that a certain rare European Epipogium aphyllum displayed both forms of asexual and sexual reproduction. The study was conducted in northern Poland where a population was observed going through gametophyte development with unpollinated flower buds.

== Distribution ==
The plants have an extremely wide range of distribution. The species is widespread across much of the temperate zone in northern and central Europe, Russia and northern Asia from Spain to Kamchatka and south to the Himalayas. There are hotspots of records ranging from the boreal regions of Scandinavia stretching as far south as the Pyrenees, the Vercors Massif, northern Greece, and Crimea. It was reported for the first time on Mount Željin in central Serbia for the first time in 2023; the estimated IUCN conservation status in Serbia is Endangered (EN). In Asia, Epipogium aphyllum is considered vulnerable in Mongolia and endangered in both Japan and China; however in North and South Korea, it is not considered threatened.

Although its conservation status, per the 2011 IUCN 3.1 assessment in Europe, was Least Concern (LC) due to its low risk of extinction, it is, however, exceptionally rare in habitat. It is protected or listed on the IUCN red list of nearly 56 countries. The plants are all found in areas which typically experience cold winters. The plant's rhizomes are densely colonized by fungi bearing clamp-connections and dolipores, all basidiomycetes, gill or pore-forming mushroom species that are normally found growing in mycorrhizal association with the roots of coniferous trees.

Only in July does Epipogium aphyllum appear above ground in northwestern Russia. Late July and the early part of August are when the blossoming period occurs. Notably, isolated specimens have been known to blossom until September in exceptional cases.
