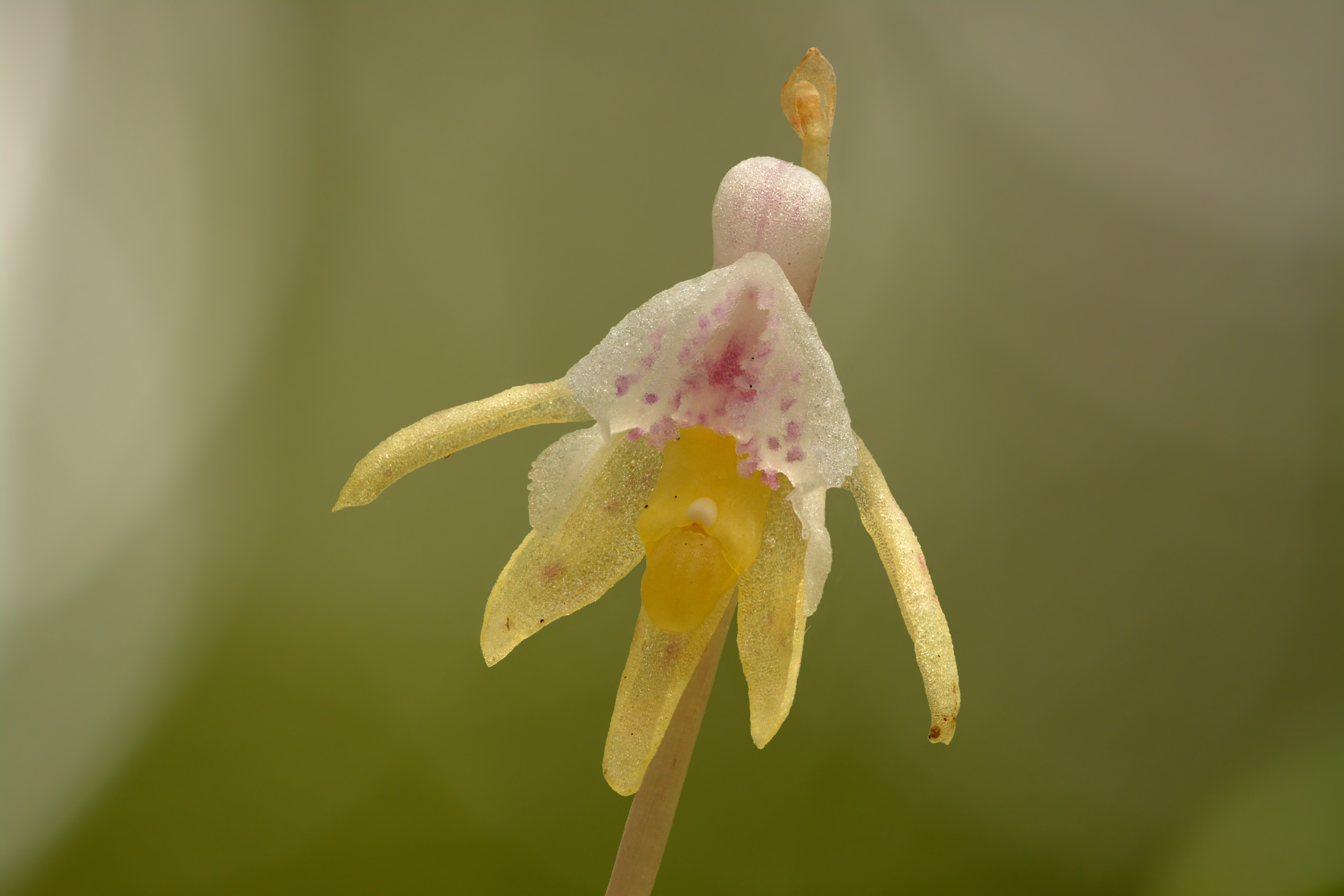
- Epipogium aphyllum

Scientific classification
- Kingdom: Plantae
- Clade: Tracheophytes
- Clade: Angiosperms
- Clade: Monocots
- Order: Asparagales
- Family: Orchidaceae
- Subfamily: Epidendroideae
- Tribe: Nervilieae
- Subtribe: Epipogiinae
- Genus: Epipogium; Borkh.

Synonyms
- Ceratopsis Lindl.; Epipogion St.-Lag.; Epipogon Ledeb.; Galera Blume; Podanthera Wight

= Epipogium =

Ghost orchids

Genus of orchids

Epipogium, commonly known as ghost orchids (Chinese: 虎舌蘭; pinyin: hǔshé lán or 上鬚蘭; shàngxū lán), is a genus of four species of terrestrial leafless orchids in the family Orchidaceae. Orchids in this genus have a fleshy, underground rhizome and a fleshy, hollow flowering stem with small, pale coloured, drooping, short-lived flowers with narrow sepals and petals. They are native to a region extending from tropical Africa to Europe, temperate and tropical Asia, Australia and some Pacific Islands.

== Description ==
Orchids in the genus Epipogium are leafless, terrestrial, mycotrophic herbs. They have a fleshy underground rhizome and the flowering stem is the only part above ground level. The flowering stem is pale-coloured, hollow, fleshy and bears a few to many drooping flowers and papery bracts. The flowers are yellowish white with violet or reddish brown markings and are short-lived. The sepals and petals are narrow and similar in size and shape to each other. The labellum is relatively broad and dished with a prominent spur at its base.

== Taxonomy and naming ==
The genus Epipogium was first formally described in 1792 by Moritz Balthasar Borkhausen after an unpublished description by Johann Georg Gmelin and the description was published in Borkhausen's book Tentamen dispositionis Plantarum Germaniae seminiferarum. The name Epipogium is derived from the Ancient Greek epi (ἐπί) meaning "upon" or "on" and pōgōn (πώγων) meaning "beard", apparently referring to the labellum.

== List of species ==
The following is a list of species of Epipogium recognised by Plants of the World Online as at October 2025:

- Epipogium aphyllum Sw. – widespread across much of Europe and northern Asia from Spain to Kamchatka and south to the Himalayas
- Epipogium japonicum Makino – Japan (Honshu), Taiwan (Hengchun Peninsula), China (Sichuan).
- Epipogium kentingense T.P.Lin & Shu H.Wu – Taiwan (Hengchun Peninsula)
- Epipogium lalashanense S.S.Ying
- Epipogium meridianum T.P.Lin
- Epipogium roseum (D.Don) Lindl. – Africa, Australia and South, Southeast and East Asia
- Epipogium sessanum S.N.Hegde & A.N.Rao
- Epipogium taiwanense T.C.Hsu

== Distribution and habitat ==
Orchids in the genus Epipogon grow in a range of habitats but are most common in rainforest, especially where there is rotting wood. They are found in Europe, Africa, India, Japan, Malaysia, Indonesia, New Guinea, the Philippines, New Guinea, Australia, the Solomon Islands, Vanuatu and east to Fiji. One species occurs in Australia and three are found in China.
