= Silvorchis aurea =

Scientific classification
- Kingdom: Plantae
- Clade: Tracheophytes
- Clade: Angiosperms
- Clade: Monocots
- Order: Asparagales
- Family: Orchidaceae
- Subfamily: Orchidoideae
- Genus: Silvorchis
- Species: S. aurea

Binomial name
- Silvorchis aurea (Aver. & Averyanova) Szlach.

Synonyms
- Vietorchis aurea Aver. & Averyanova

Genus of orchids

Silvorchis aurea is a species of myco-heterotrophic flowering plants in the orchid family, Orchidaceae. It is endemic to northern Vietnam. It was first described as Vietorchis aurea, the only species in the genus Vietorchis.
