= Nervilia uniflora =

Red shield orchid

Scientific classification
- Kingdom: Plantae
- Clade: Embryophytes
- Clade: Tracheophytes
- Clade: Spermatophytes
- Clade: Angiosperms
- Clade: Monocots
- Order: Asparagales
- Family: Orchidaceae
- Subfamily: Epidendroideae
- Genus: Nervilia
- Species: N. uniflora

Binomial name
- Nervilia uniflora (F.Muell.) Schltr.

Synonyms
- Pogonia uniflora F.Muell.

Species of orchid

Nervilia uniflora, commonly known as the red shield orchid, is a small terrestrial orchid found in northern Queensland, Australia. It has a single short-lived, pink or mauve flower. A dark green, heart-shaped leaf emerges at the base of the flowering stem after flowering.

== Description ==
Nervilia uniflora is a terrestrial, perennial, deciduous, sympodial herb which grows in colonies with only a few individuals producing flowers in any one year. A single pink or mauve flower 25–30 mm (0.98–1.2 in) long and wide are borne on a flowering stem 100–200 mm (4–8 in) tall. The sepals are 18–23 mm (0.7–0.9 in) long and about 3 mm (0.1 in) wide and the petals are similar but slightly shorter and narrower. The labellum is pink to mauve, 14–18 mm (0.6–0.7 in) long, 5–6 mm (0.20–0.24 in) wide with three lobes, the middle lobe turned downwards. After flowering, a single heart-shaped leaf develops, including on those plants that did not flower. The leaf is dark green on the upper surface, reddish below, 25–35 mm (0.98–1.4 in) wide and held horizontally above ground level. Flowering occurs between November and January.

== Taxonomy and naming ==
The red shield orchid was first formally described in 1866 by Ferdinand von Mueller who gave it the name Pogonia uniflora and published the description in Fragmenta phytographiae Australiae. In 1906 Rudolf Schlechter changed the name to Nervilia uniflora. The specific epithet (uniflora) means "one-flowered".

== Distribution and habitat ==
Nervilia uniflora occurs in north Queensland between Cooktown and Proserpine. It grows in woodland, forest and rainforest.
