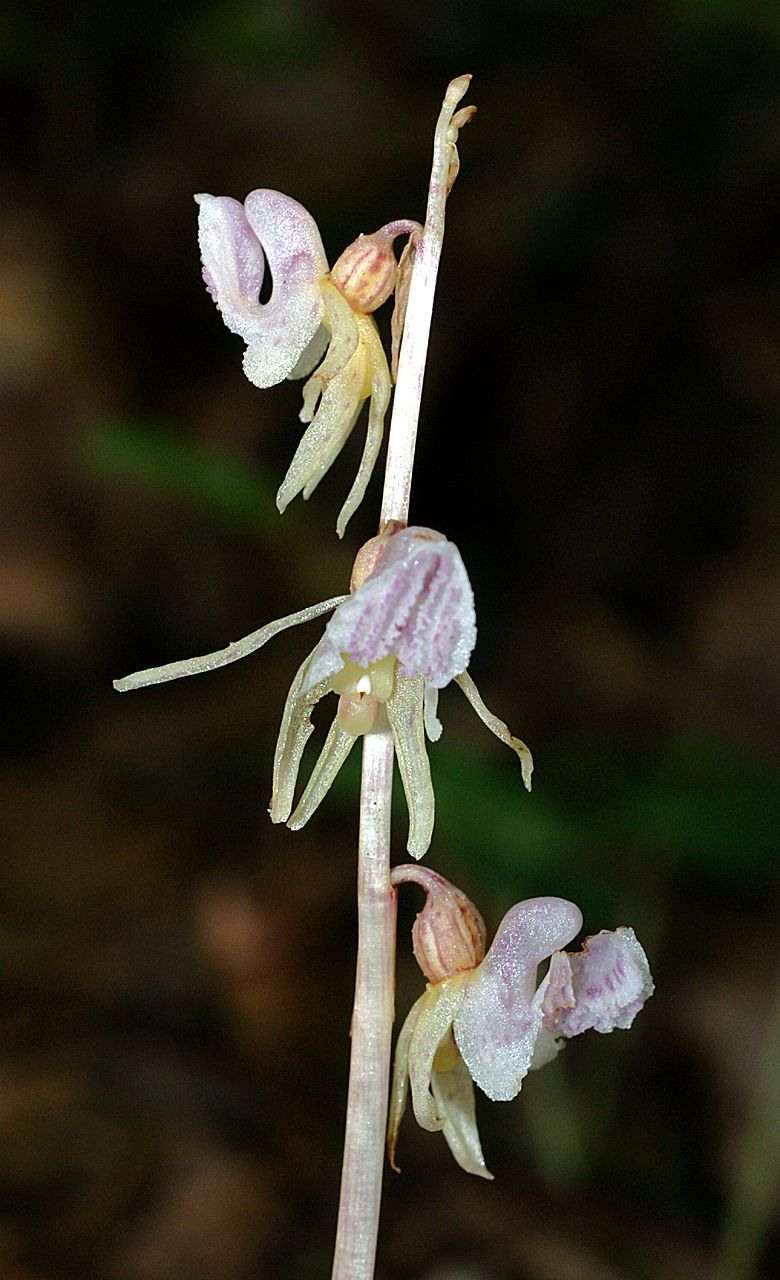

Scientific classification
- Kingdom: Plantae
- Clade: Embryophytes
- Clade: Tracheophytes
- Clade: Spermatophytes
- Clade: Angiosperms
- Clade: Monocots
- Order: Asparagales
- Family: Orchidaceae
- Subfamily: Epidendroideae
- Tribe: Nervilieae; Dressler (1990) Lindleyana, 5, 117-25 (1990)

Subtribes and genera
- Nerviliinae; Nervilia; Epipogiinae; Epipogium; Stereosandra

= Nervilieae =

Tribe of orchids

Nervilieae is an orchid tribe in the subfamily Epidendroideae.

== See also ==
- Taxonomy of the Orchidaceae
