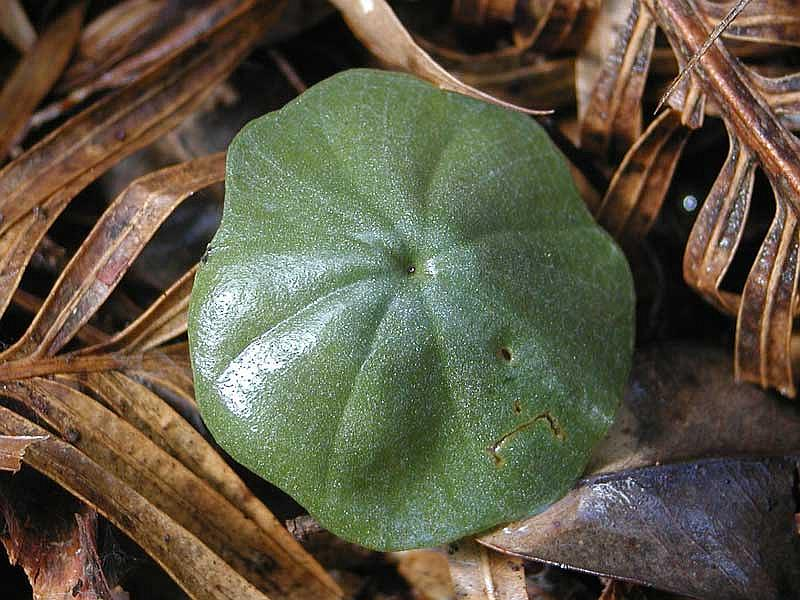

Scientific classification
- Kingdom: Plantae
- Clade: Tracheophytes
- Clade: Angiosperms
- Clade: Monocots
- Order: Asparagales
- Family: Orchidaceae
- Subfamily: Epidendroideae
- Genus: Nervilia
- Species: N. peltata

Binomial name
- Nervilia peltata B.Gray & D.L.Jones

= Nervilia peltata =

Grey shield orchid

Species of orchid

Nervilia peltata, commonly known as the grey shield orchid, is a small terrestrial orchid found in northern Australia. It has up to three pale green, short-lived flowers with a white labellum and a more or less circular leaf which emerges at the base of the flowering stem after flowering.

== Description ==
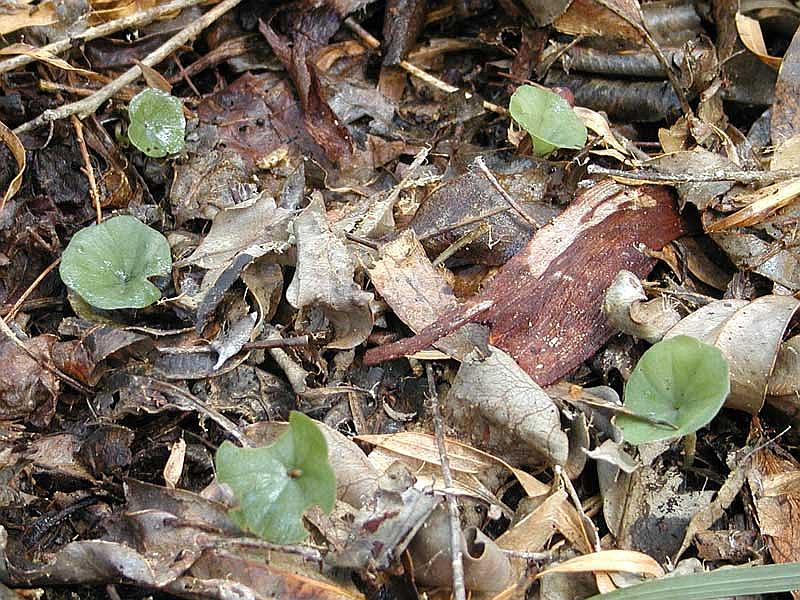
Nervilia peltata

Nervilia peltata is a terrestrial, perennial, deciduous, sympodial herb which grows in colonies with only a few individuals producing flowers in any one year. A single pale green flower 20–28 mm (0.8–1 in) long and wide is borne on an erect, fleshy flowering stem 100–200 mm (4–8 in) tall. The sepals are 18–23 mm (0.7–0.9 in) long and about 3 mm (0.1 in) wide and the petals are similar but slightly shorter and narrower. The labellum is white with a wide fringe and small calli. The flower only lasts for about one day, following which a single leaf develops, including on those plants that did not flower. The leaf is pale greyish green, more or less circular with a central stalk, 20–45 mm (0.8–2 in) in diameter with irregular edges. Flowering occurs between December and February.

== Taxonomy and naming ==
Nervilia peltata was first formally described in 1994 by Bruce Gray and David Jones and the description was published in the journal Austrobaileya. The specific epithet (peltata) is a Latin word meaning "shield-shaped" or "armed with a shield".

== Distribution and habitat ==
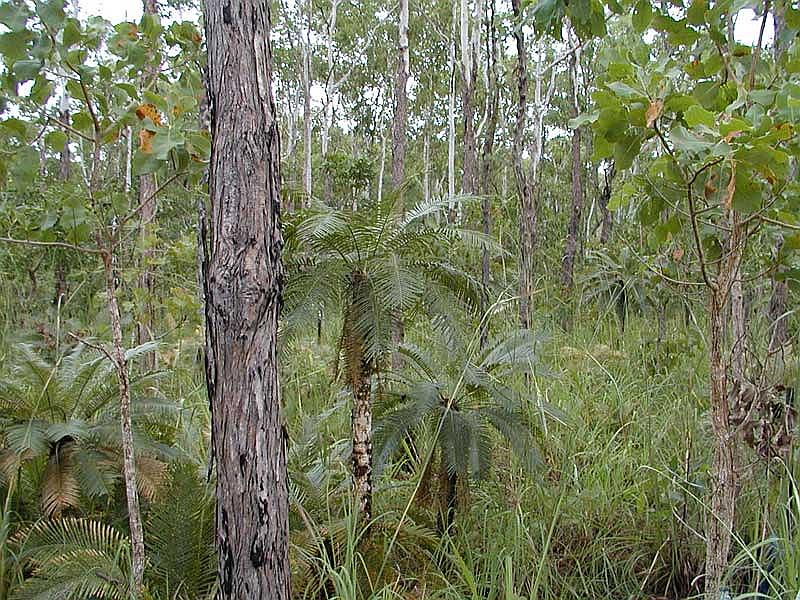
Habitat

The grey shield orchid occurs on the Cape York Peninsula as far south as Hinchinbrook Island and on some of the islands in the Torres Strait. It is also found in the northern part of the Northern Territory. The usual habitat is forest or woodland where the orchid grows with grasses, often in large open colonies.
