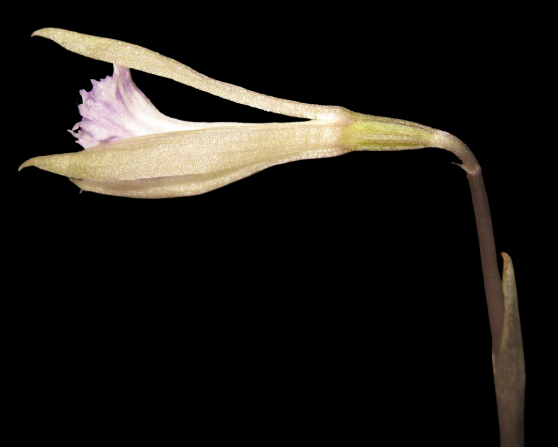
- Resupination of flower with 180° torsion

Scientific classification
- Kingdom: Plantae
- Clade: Tracheophytes
- Clade: Angiosperms
- Clade: Monocots
- Order: Asparagales
- Family: Orchidaceae
- Subfamily: Epidendroideae
- Genus: Nervilia
- Species: N. simplex

Binomial name
- Nervilia simplex (Thouars) Schltr.

= Nervilia simplex =

Species of flowering plant

Nervilia simplex, commonly known as trembling nervilia or round shield orchid, is a small terrestrial orchid found in South and Southeast Asia and in New Guinea and northern Australia. It has a single short-lived green flower with a white labellum. A more or less circular leaf held horizontally above the ground emerges at the base of the flowering stem after flowering.

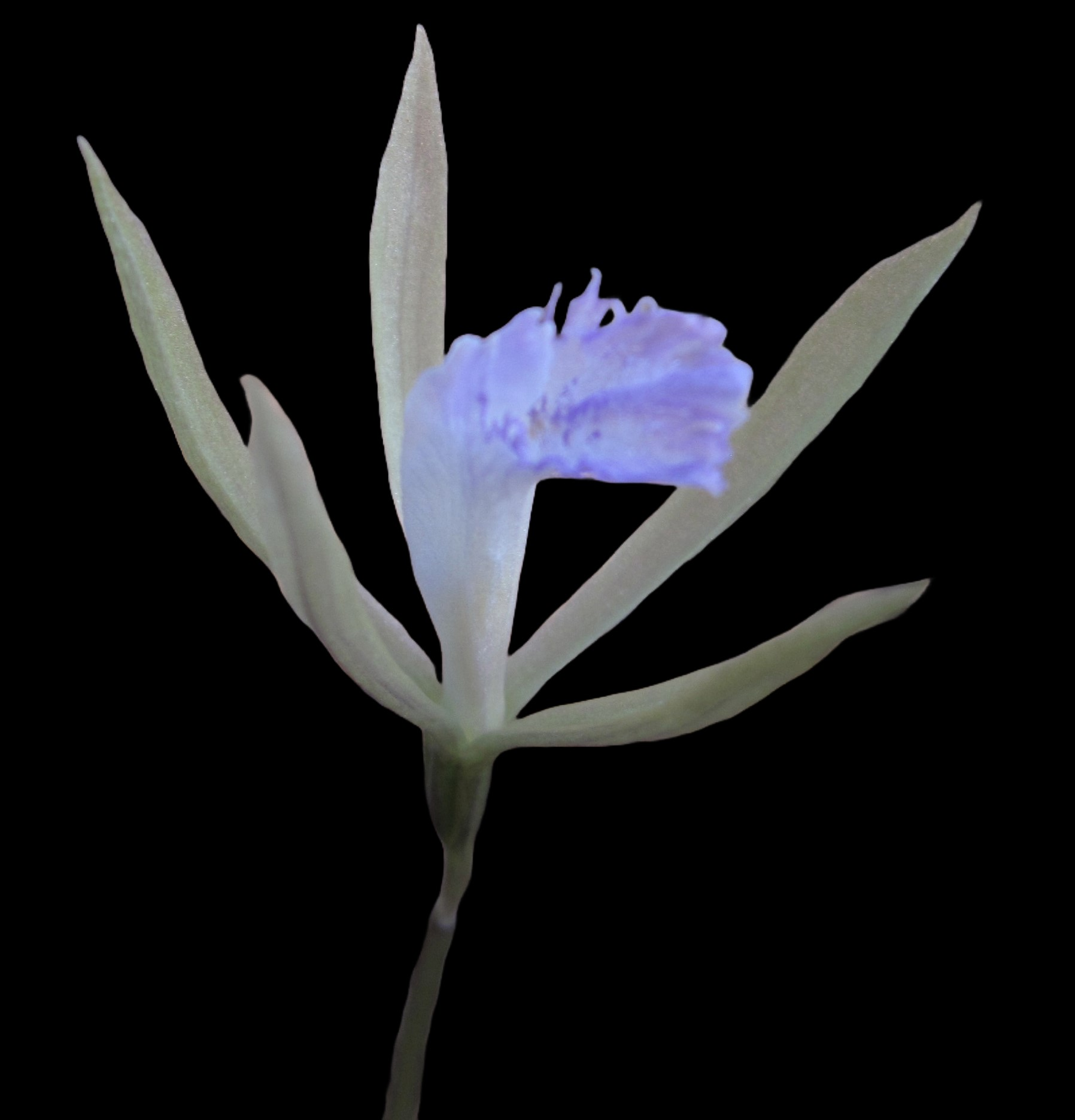
Flower of Nervilia simplex at Himachal Pradesh India.

== Description ==
The tuber is somewhat round to egg-shaped, 1–2 cm (0.4–0.8 inches) across, whitish in colour and sparsely covered with root-knobes, producing only one leaf each year. The leaf measures 2.5 cm (0.98 in) long and 2.5 cm (0.98 in) wide and is kidney-shaped to nearly circular, with shallow rounded teeth and a pointed tip. The base is heart-shaped, and the side facing away from the stem is coloured pale green, while the side facing toward the stem is darker green with fine white branched veins and small sparse bristles. The leaf has 7 main veins. The leaf stalk is erect, about 2 cm (0.79 in) long. The flower stalk is produced from the top of the bulb and is held erect, about 4–5 cm (1.6–2.0 in) long, and is green in colour, bearing one flower. The flower bract is small, egg-shaped to lance-shaped, and pointed. The flowers open widely, twisting as they open, and measure 2–4 cm (0.79–1.57 in) across. The sepals (outer tepals) are yellowish green with faint grey lines, and are narrow, 2–2.5 cm (0.79–0.98 in) long and 0.12–0.25 cm (0.047–0.098 in) wide, with a sharp to tapering point. The petals (inner tepals) are creamy white and narrowly lance-shaped, measuring 1.8–2.3 cm (0.71–0.91 in) long and 0.1–0.2 cm (0.039–0.079 in) wide. The lip of the flower is strongly reflexed above the middle and is also creamy white, with a light purple mid lobe. This lobe is fringed and white at the base, with a yellowish patch at the centre, and is rhombic in shape, 1.5–1.8 cm (0.59–0.71 in) long and 0.8–1.3 cm (0.31–0.51 in) wide when flattened. It lacks spurs, and is entire or 3-lobed, loosely embracing the column; the margin at the growing tip is irregularly jagged or fringed, and a ridge extends from the base to the tip of the disk. The column is club-shaped, 0.6–0.8 cm (0.24–0.31 in) long, and the tip is relatively large. The stigma is somewhat round. The fruit-stalk is about 17 cm (6.7 in) long, bearing capsules measuring 1–1.5 cm (0.39–0.59 in) long and 0.5 cm (0.20 in) wide. The flower's tepals partially cover the capsule even after drying.

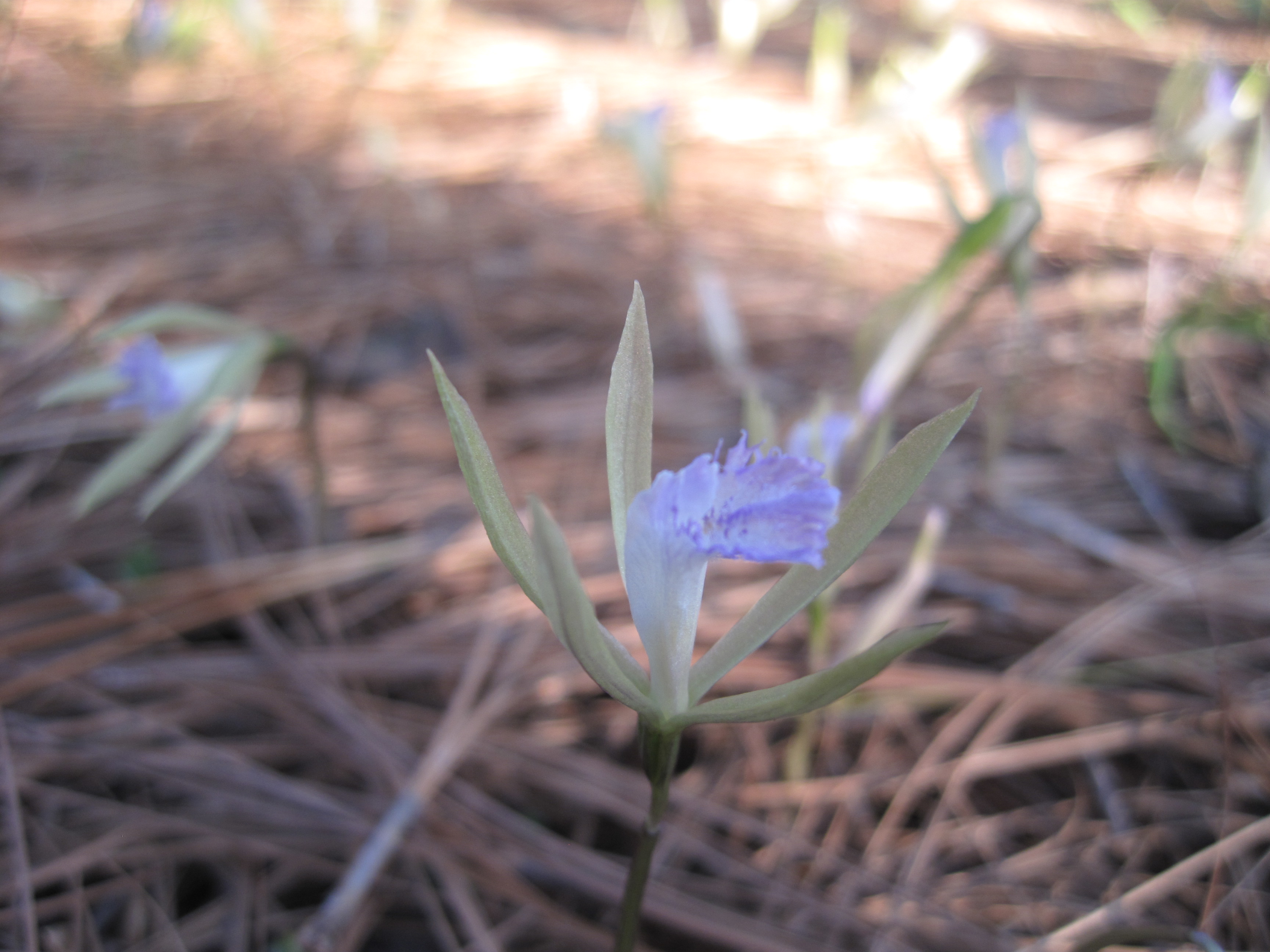
Flower

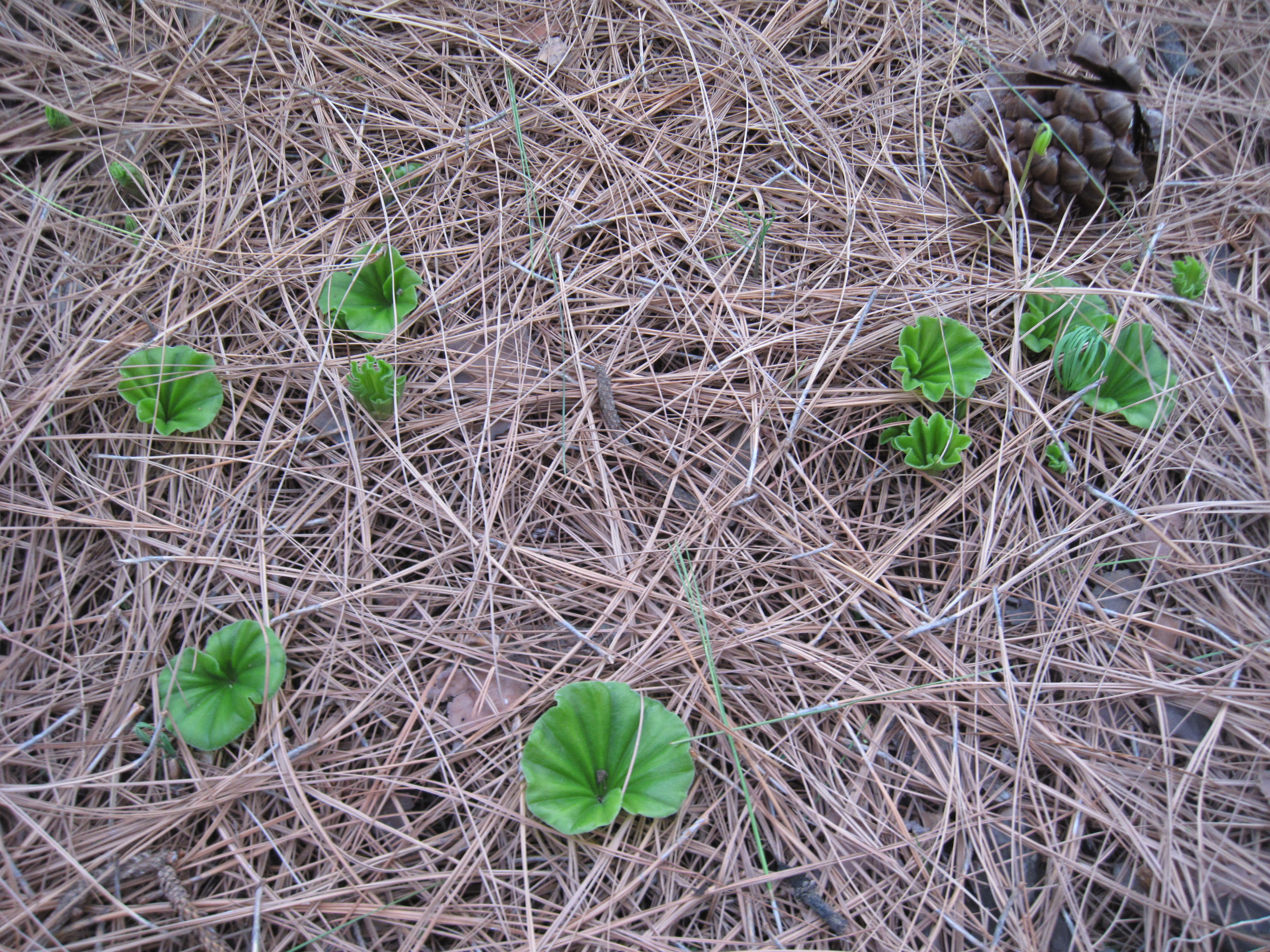
Leaf

== Taxonomy and naming ==
This species was first formally described in 1822 by Louis-Marie Aubert du Petit-Thouars who gave it the name Arethusa simplex in Histoire particulière des plantes orchidées recueillies sur les trois îles australes d'Afrique, de France, de Bourbon et de Madagascar. In 1911, Rudolf Schlechter transferred the species to Nervilia as N. simplex in Botanische Jahrbücher für Systematik, Pflanzengeschichte und Pflanzengeographie.

- In 1826, Kurt Polycarp Joachim Sprengel transferred Thouars's Arethusa simplex to Epidendrum as E. simplex in Systema vegetabilium, but according to Plants of the World Online, that name is a synonym of Nervilia simplex.
- In 1846, Heinrich Zollinger and Alexander Moritzi described Bolborchis crociformis and published the description in the Moritzi's book Systematisches verzeichniss der von H. Zollinger, but according to Plants of the World Online, B. crociformis is a synonym of Nervilia simplex.
- In 1978, Gunnar Seidenfaden transferred Zollinger's B. crociformis to Nervilia as N. crociformis, but, according to Plants of the World Online, Nervilia crociformis is a synonym of Nervilia simplex.
- In 1854, John Lindley described Coelogyne javanica in Folia Orchidacea, but according to Plants of the World Online, this name is a synonym of Nervilia simplex.
- In 1865, Reichenbach transferred Thouars's Arethusa simplex to Pogonia as P. simplex in Xenia Orchidacea, but that name is also a synonym of Nervilia simplex.

== Distribution and habitat ==
Nervilia simplex is a ground-dwelling plant, growing in open forest floors covered with dry pine needles, at an elevation of 300–1,500 metres (980–4,920 feet). It can be found in the countries India (specifically in the states Andhra Pradesh, Arunachal Pradesh, Goa, Jharkhand, Karnataka, Kerala, Maharashtra, Manipur, Odisha, Sikkim, Tamil Nadu, Uttarakhand and now in Himachal Pradesh), Nepal, China, Indonesia, Malaysia, Philippines, Thailand, Indo-China, New Guinea, Africa, and Australia.

== Variety ==
A variety of N. simplex, known as var. himachalensis has been described in 2024, but is not as yet accepted by Plants of the World Online. The new variety has leaves 50–60 mm (2.0–2.4 in) long and 50–75 mm (2.0–3.0 in) wide with eleven to thirteen main prominent veins, and creamy-white and purple flowers arranged in pairs on a pale green peduncle.
