= Nervilia holochila =

Ribbed shield orchid

Scientific classification
- Kingdom: Plantae
- Clade: Tracheophytes
- Clade: Angiosperms
- Clade: Monocots
- Order: Asparagales
- Family: Orchidaceae
- Subfamily: Epidendroideae
- Genus: Nervilia
- Species: N. holochila

Binomial name
- Nervilia holochila (F.Muell.) Schltr.

Synonyms
- Pogonia holochila F.Muell.

Species of orchid

Nervilia holochila, commonly known as the ribbed shield orchid, is a small terrestrial orchid found in northern Australia. It has up to six pink, greenish or cream-coloured, short-lived flowers with a pink to mauve labellum. A dark green, egg-shaped leaf emerges at the base of the flowering stem after flowering.

== Description ==
Nervilia holochila is a terrestrial, perennial, deciduous, sympodial herb which grows in colonies with only a few individuals producing flowers in any one year. Up to six pink, greenish or cream-coloured flowers 20–30 mm (0.8–1 in) long and wide are borne on a flowering stem 150–250 mm (6–10 in) tall. The sepals are 20–25 mm (0.8–1 in) long and about 3 mm (0.1 in) wide and the petals are similar but slightly shorter. The labellum is pink to mauve, 18–24 mm (0.7–0.9 in) long, 10–14 mm (0.4–0.6 in) wide with a wavy edge and dark hairy veins. The flowers only last for a few days, following which a single leaf develops, including on those plants that did not flower. The leaf is erect and dark green, 150–200 mm (6–8 in) long, 50–70 mm (2–3 in) wide and broadly egg-shaped with a stalk, 30–50 mm (1–2 in) long. Flowering occurs between November and December.

== Taxonomy and naming ==
The ribbed shield orchid was first formally described in 1866 by Ferdinand von Mueller who gave it the namePogonia holochila and published the description in Fragmenta phytographiae Australiae. In 1906 Rudolf Schlechter changed the name to Nervilia holochila. The specific epithet (holochila) is derived from the ancient Greek words holos (ὅλος) meaning "whole" and cheilos (χεῖλος) meaning "lip".

== Distribution and habitat ==
The ribbed shield orchid occurs in the northern Kimberley region of Western Australia, northern parts of the Northern Territory, on the Cape York Peninsula as far south as Bowen and on some of the islands in the Torres Strait. It grows in forest, on rainforest margins and around swamps.
