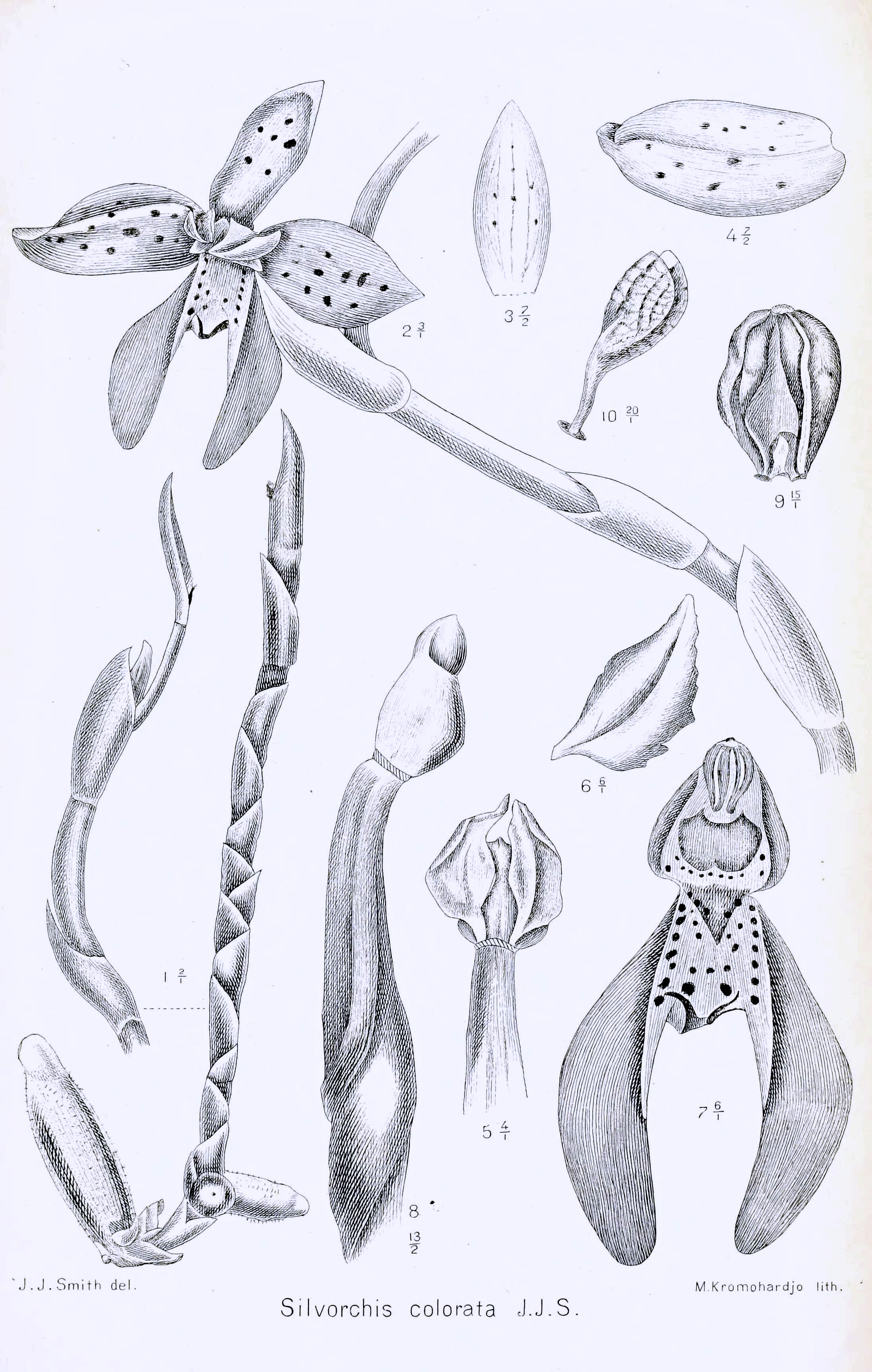
- Silvorchis colorata

Scientific classification
- Kingdom: Plantae
- Clade: Tracheophytes
- Clade: Angiosperms
- Clade: Monocots
- Order: Asparagales
- Family: Orchidaceae
- Subfamily: Orchidoideae
- Tribe: Orchideae
- Subtribe: Orchidinae
- Genus: Silvorchis; J.J.Sm.

Synonyms
- Vietorchis Aver. & Averyanova

= Silvorchis =

Genus of plants in the orchid family

Silvorchis is a genus of flowering plants from the orchid family, Orchidaceae.

Silvorchis was previously included in the subtribe Epipogiinae, but is now placed in Orchidinae.

== Species ==
Species accepted by Plants of the World Online as of August 2023:

- Silvorchis aurea (Aver. & Averyanova) Szlach.
- Silvorchis colorata J.J.Sm.
- Silvorchis furcata (Aver. & Nuraliev) Oledrz. & Szlach.
- Silvorchis vietnamica Aver., Dinh & K.S.Nguyen

== See also ==
- List of Orchidaceae genera
