= Epipogiinae =

Scientific classification
- Kingdom: Plantae
- Clade: Tracheophytes
- Clade: Angiosperms
- Clade: Monocots
- Order: Asparagales
- Family: Orchidaceae
- Subfamily: Epidendroideae
- Tribe: Nervilieae
- Subtribe: Epipogiinae; Schltr., Notizbl. Bot. Gart. Mus. Berlin-Dahlem 9: 571 (1926)

Genera
- Epipogium; Stereosandra

Subtribe of orchids

Epipogiinae is an orchid subtribe in the tribe Nervilieae.

The genus Silvorchis was previously included but is now placed in the subtribe Orchidinae.

== See also ==
- Taxonomy of the Orchidaceae
