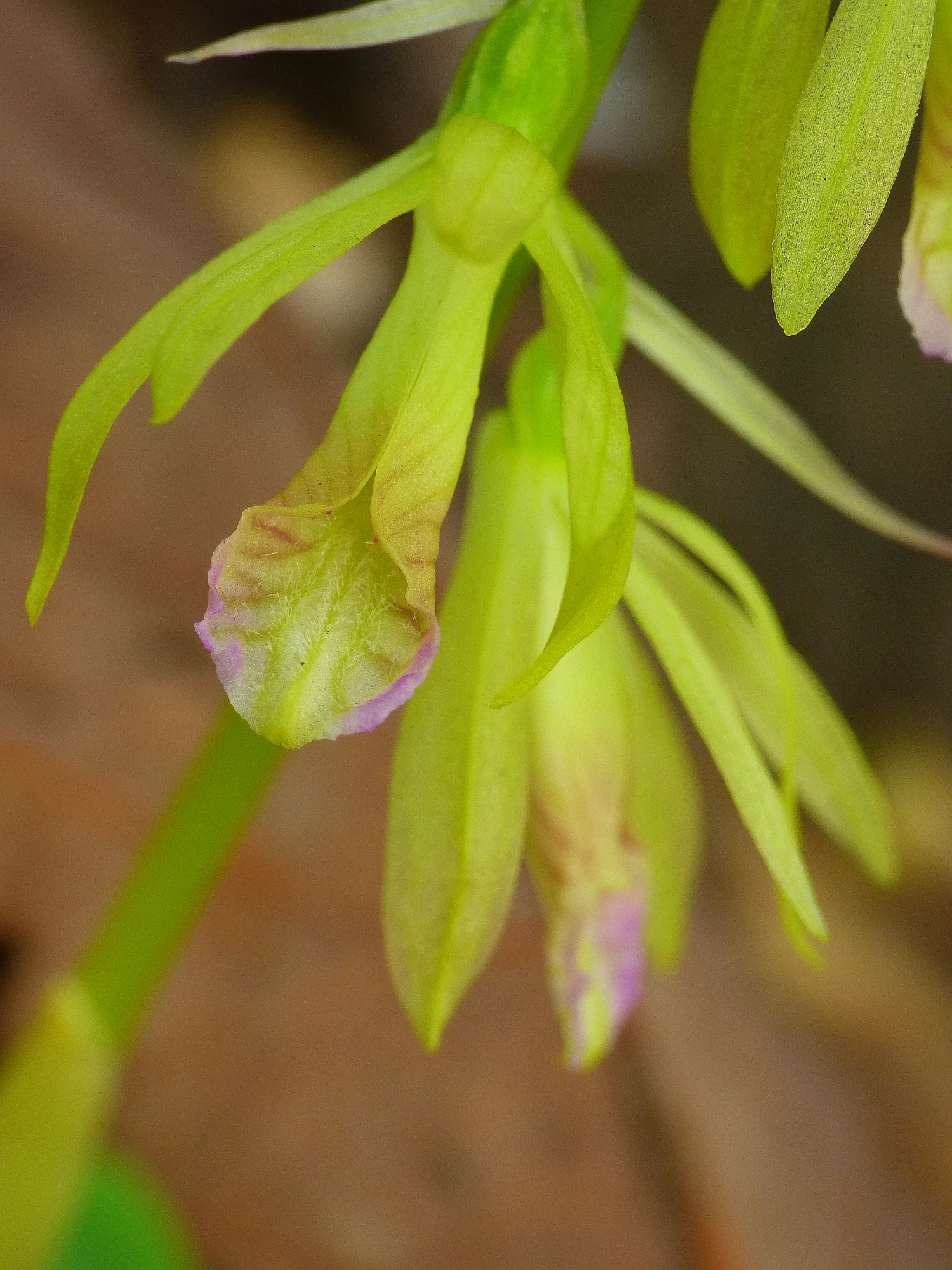
- In Udaipur district, India

Scientific classification
- Kingdom: Plantae
- Clade: Embryophytes
- Clade: Tracheophytes
- Clade: Spermatophytes
- Clade: Angiosperms
- Clade: Monocots
- Order: Asparagales
- Family: Orchidaceae
- Subfamily: Epidendroideae
- Genus: Nervilia
- Species: N. concolor

Binomial name
- Nervilia concolor (Blume) Schltr.

Synonyms
- List: Cordyla concolor Blume; Pogonia concolor (Blume) Blume; Roptrostemon concolor (Blume) Lindl.; Aplostellis flabelliformis (Lindl.) Ridl.; Epipactis carinata Roxb.; Nervilia aragoana Gaudich.; Nervilia carinata (Roxb.) Schltr.; Nervilia flabelliformis (Lindl.) Tang & F.T.Wang; Nervilia scottii (Rchb.f.) Schltr.; Nervilia tibetensis Rolfe; Nervilia yaeyamensis Hayata; Pogonia carinata (Roxb.) Lindl.; Pogonia flabelliformis Lindl.; Pogonia gracilis Blume ); Pogonia nervilia Blume; Pogonia scottii Rchb.f.

= Nervilia concolor =

Tall shield orchid

Species of orchid

Nervilia concolor (known by some taxonomic authorities as Nervilia aragoana) commonly known as tall shield orchid, is a small terrestrial orchid found in South Asia and Southeast Asia and in the northern regions of Australia. It has pale green, short-lived flowers with a cream-colored or yellowish labellum and a more or less circular leaf that emerges at the base of the flowering stem after flowering.

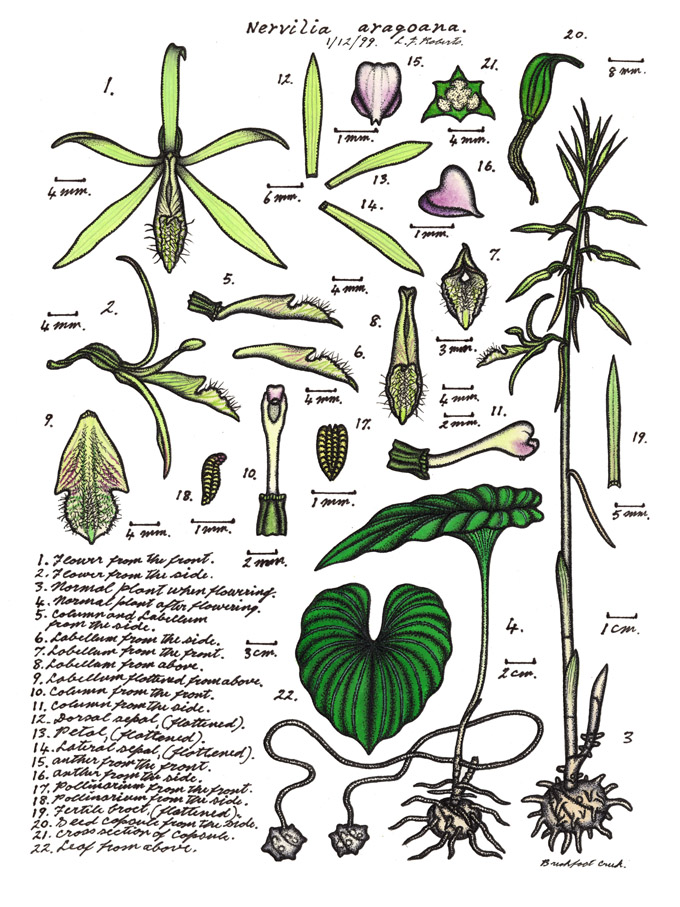
Illustration by Lewis Roberts

== Description ==
Nervilia concolor is a terrestrial, perennial, deciduous, sympodial herb which grows in colonies with only a few individuals producing flowers in any one year. Between two and six pale green flowers 35–40 mm (1–2 in) long and 30–35 mm (1.2–1.4 in) wide are borne on an erect flowering stem 200–350 mm (8–10 in) tall. The sepals are 17–24 mm (0.7–0.9 in) long and about 2 mm (0.08 in) wide and the petals are similar but slightly shorter. The labellum has three lobes and is cream-coloured or yellowish with hairy purple or green veins. The side lobes curl inwards and the middle lobe has wavy edges and three hairy ridges. The flowers only last up to four days, following which a single leaf develops, including on those plants that did not flower. The leaf is bright green, heart-shaped or kidney-shaped but appears almost circular, 150–250 mm (6–10 in) in diameter with wavy edges and prominent radiating veins. In Australia, flowering occurs between September and December after heavy rain but in areas north of the equator in April and May.

== Taxonomy and naming ==
The tall shield orchid was first formally described in 1825 by Carl Ludwig Blume who gave it the name Cordyla concolor and published the description in Bijdragen tot de flora van Nederlandsch Indië. In 1911 Rudolf Schlechter transferred the species to Nervilia as N. concolor in Botanische Jahrbücher für Systematik, Pflanzengeschichte und Pflanzengeographie. The specific epithet (concolor) is a Latin word meaning "coloured uniformly".

In Australia the species is known as Nervilia aragoana, first described in 1827 by Charles Gaudichaud-Beaupré in Voyage autour du monde...sur les corvettes de S.M. l'Uranie et la Physicienne from specimens collected on Guam in the Mariana Islands.

The species is known by a variety of vernacular names in Asia:

- Malaysia: Daun sa-helai sa-tahun, daun satu tahun (Peninsular).
- Thailand: Phaen din yen (Chiang Rai), waan phra chim (Bangkok).
- Vietnam: Ch[aa]n tr[aa]u xanh, thanh thi[ee]n q[uf]y, Ian c[owf].
- Japan: Yaeyama-kuma-sô, aoi-bokuro

== Distribution and habitat ==
Nervilia concolor occurs in Nepal, Bhutan, eastern India, Myanmar, Indochina, southern China, Taiwan, southern Japan, Thailand, the Malaysian region, New Guinea, the Pacific Islands, Queensland and the Northern Territory. It grows in forest, rainforest and monsoonal rainforest.

== Gallery ==
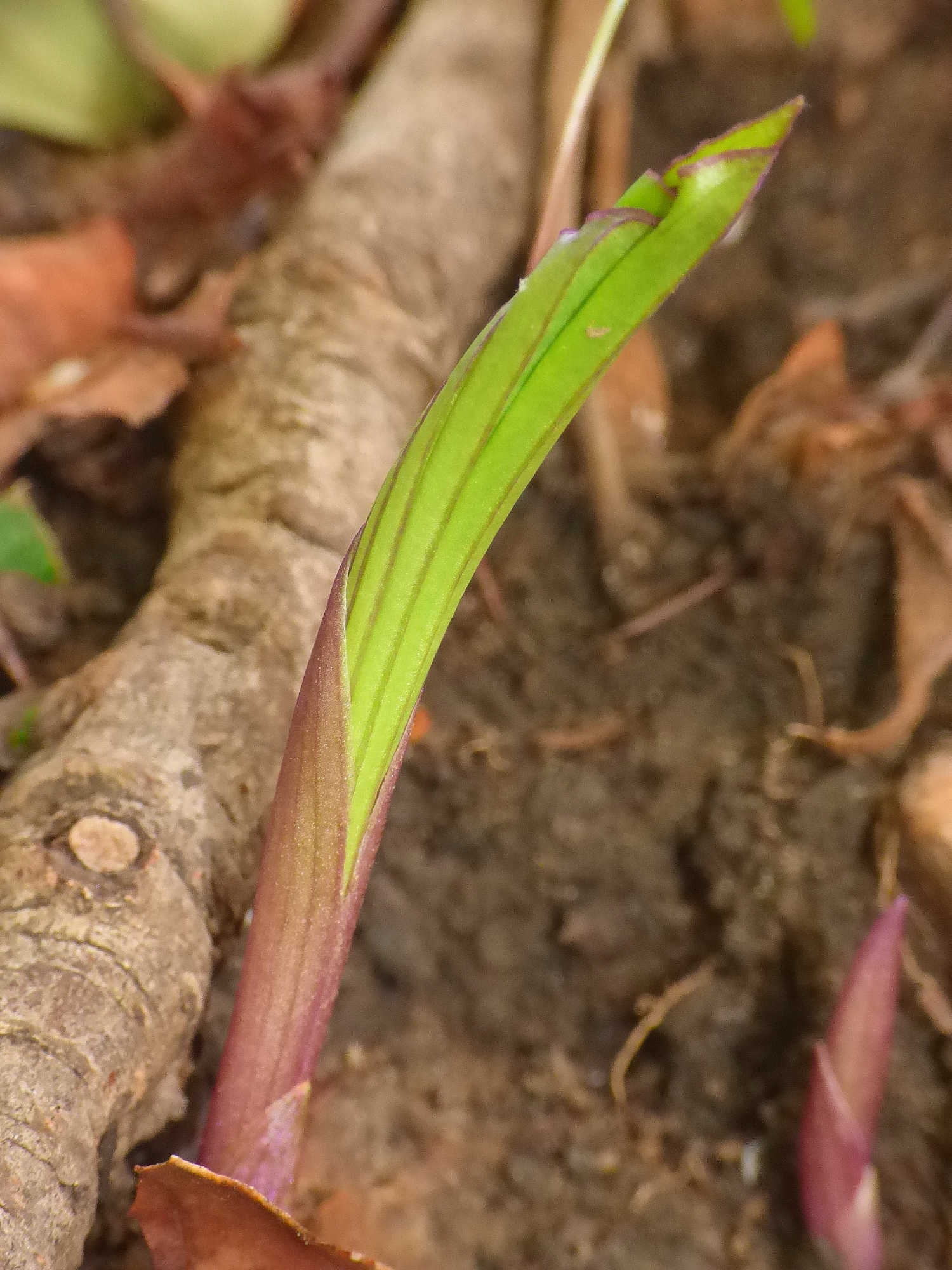
Emergent leaf. Nala Village, Udaipur district, Rajasthan

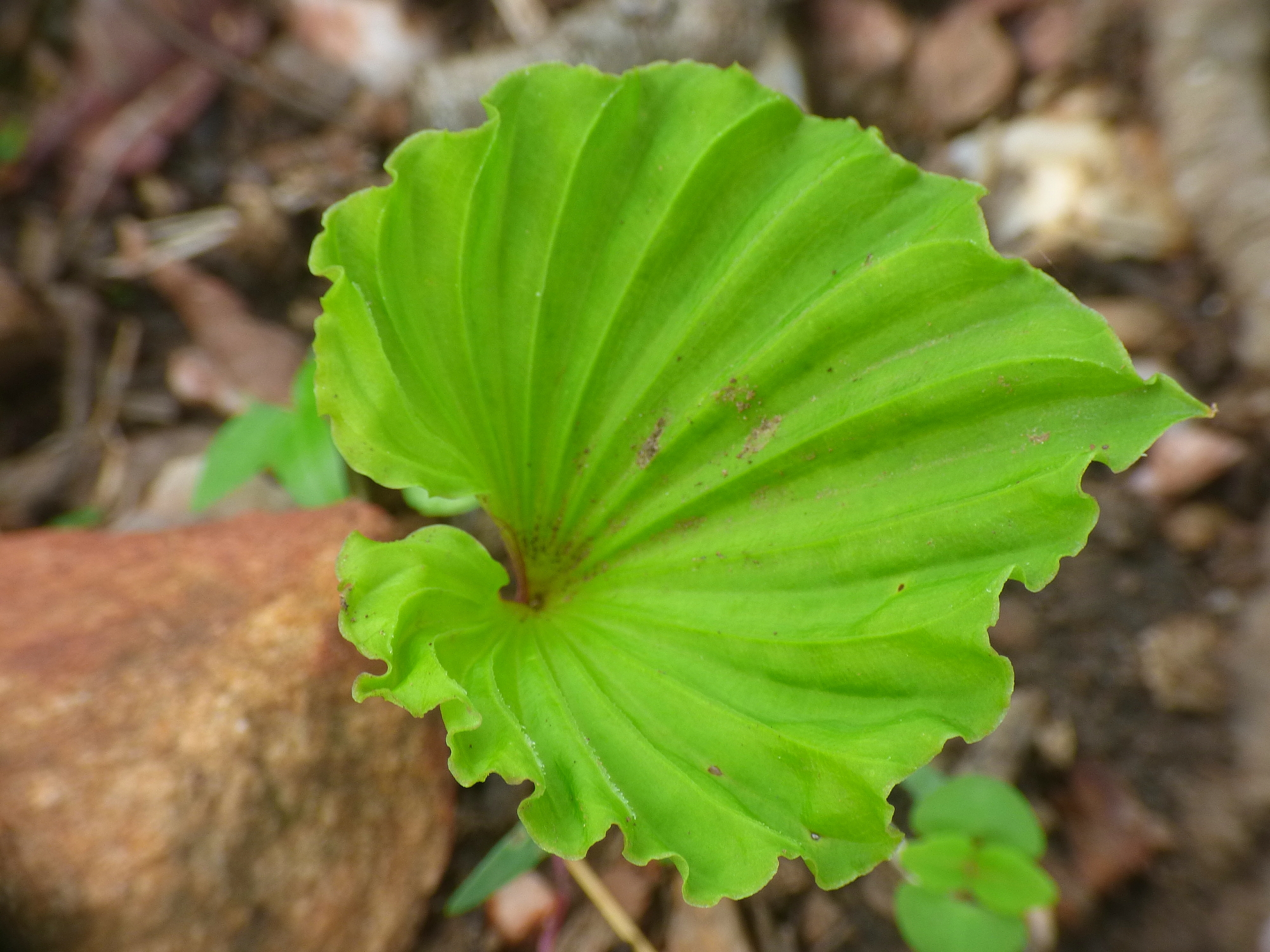
New leaf still showing folds. Nala Village, Udaipur district, Rajasthan

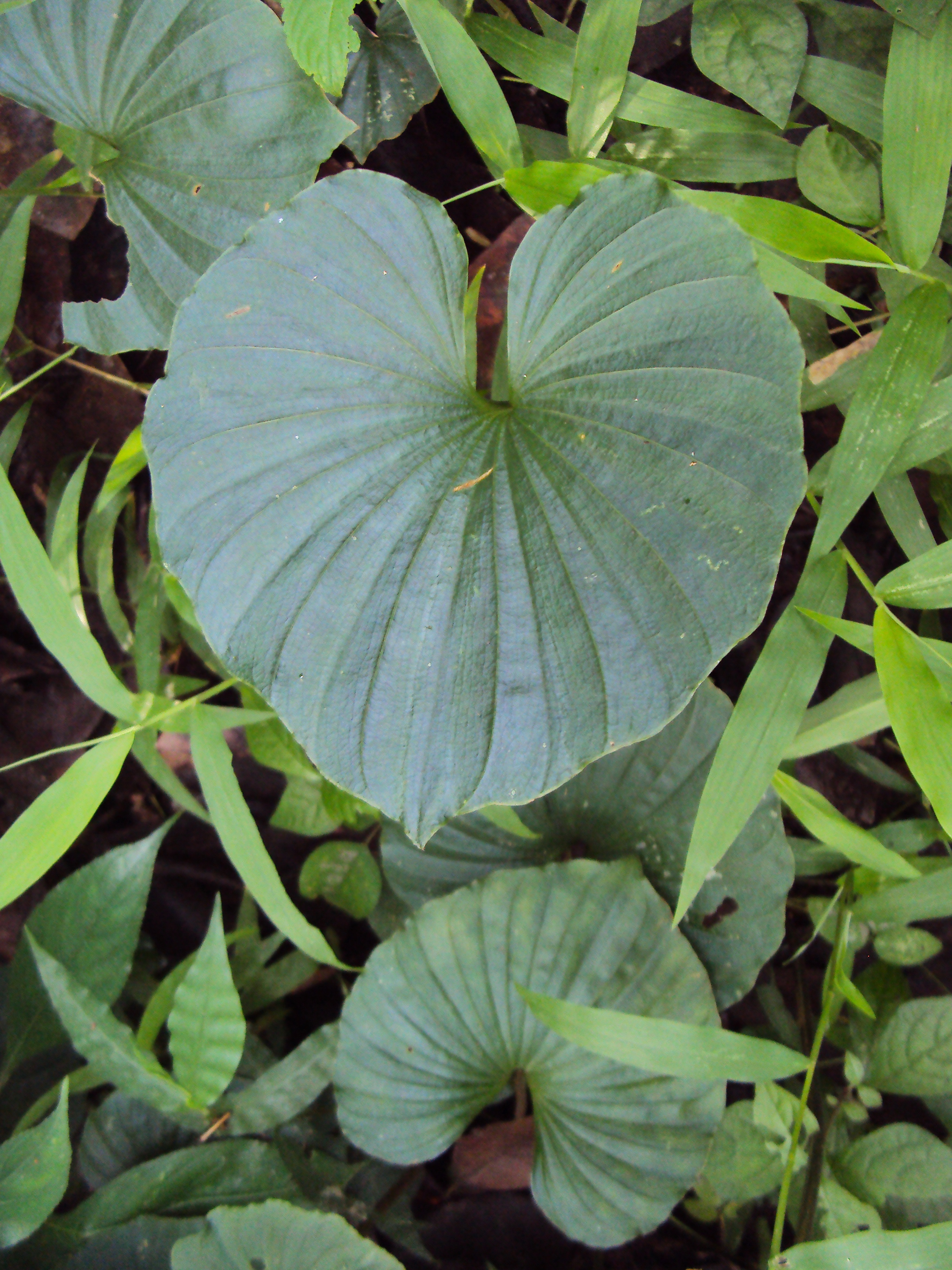
Leaves. Vayathur, Kerala, India

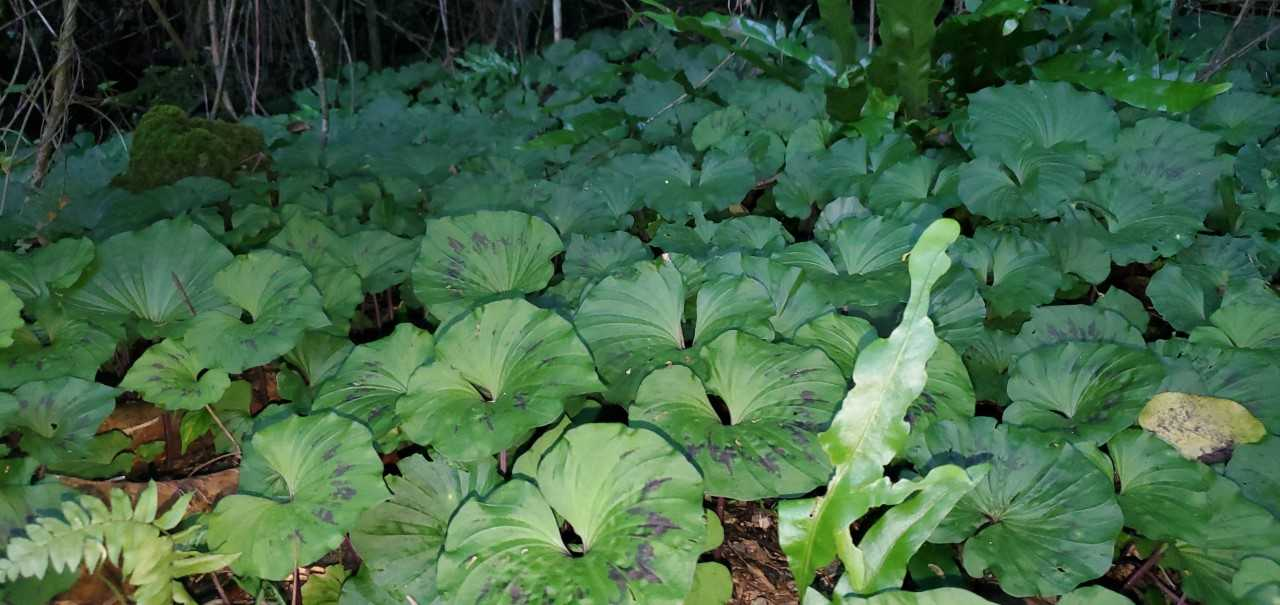
Colony in Tanguisson, Dededo, Guam

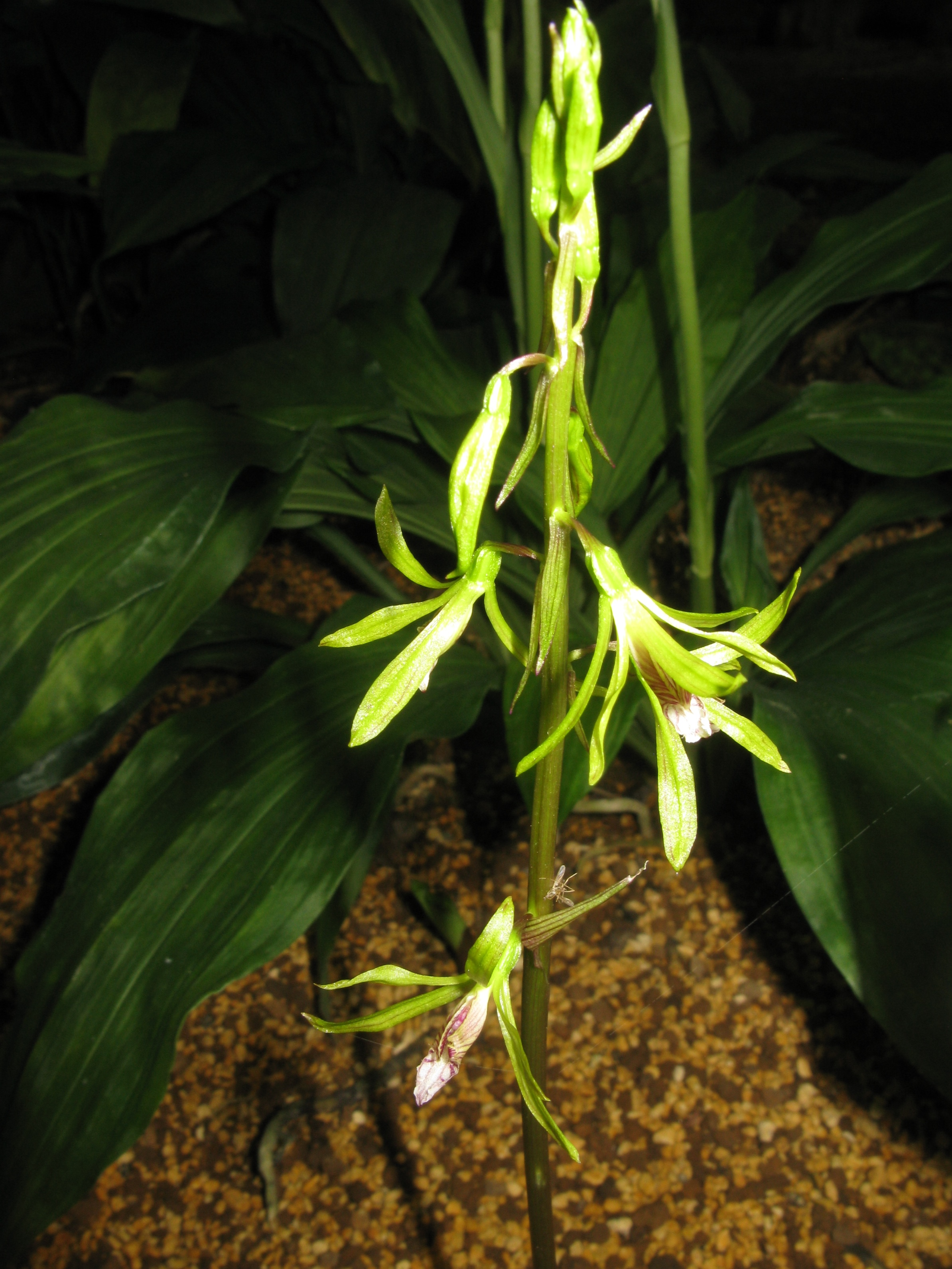
Flowering stem. Tsukuba Botanical Garden, Ibaraki pref., Japan

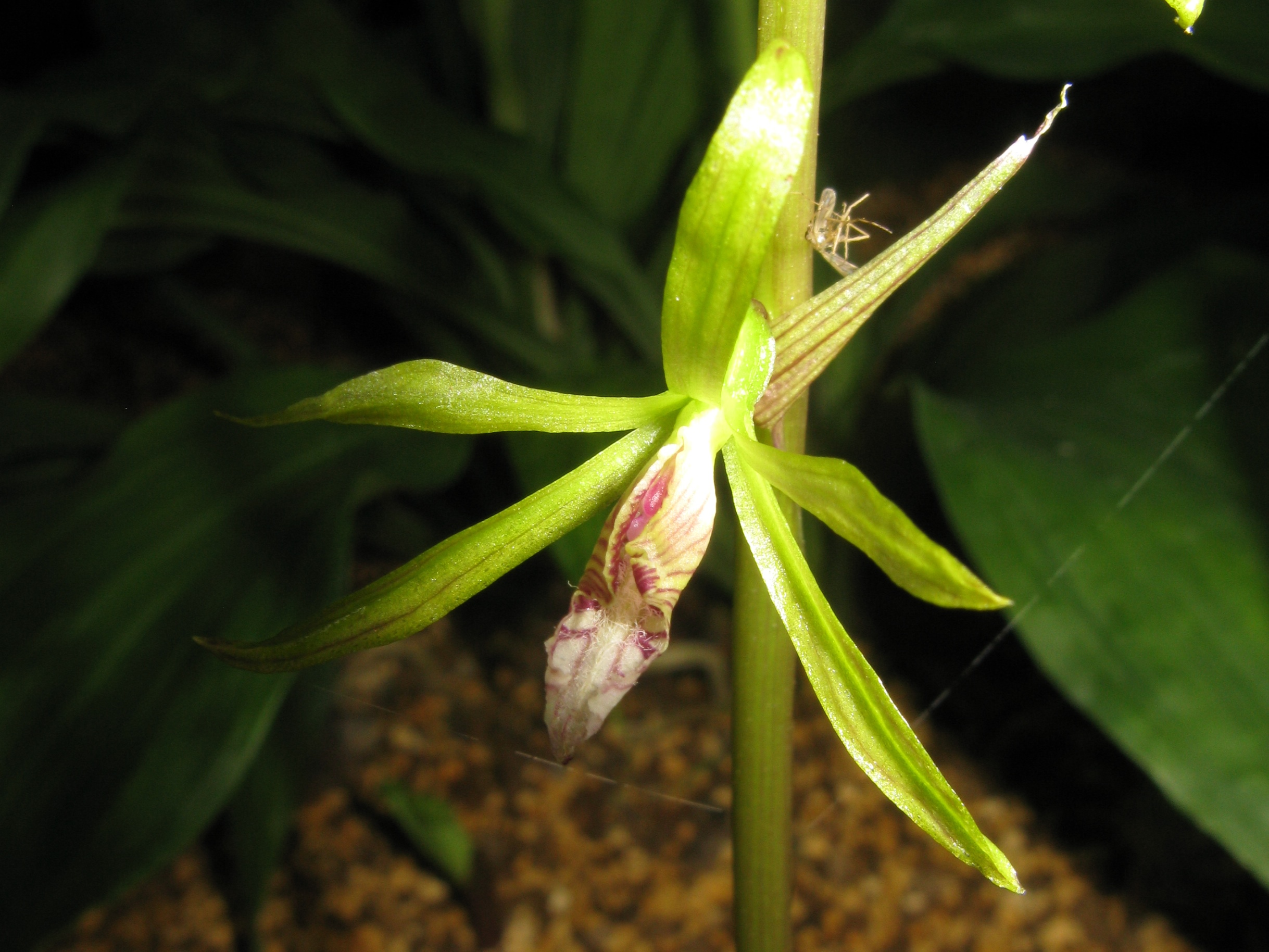
Flower. Tsukuba Botanical Garden, Ibaraki pref., Japan

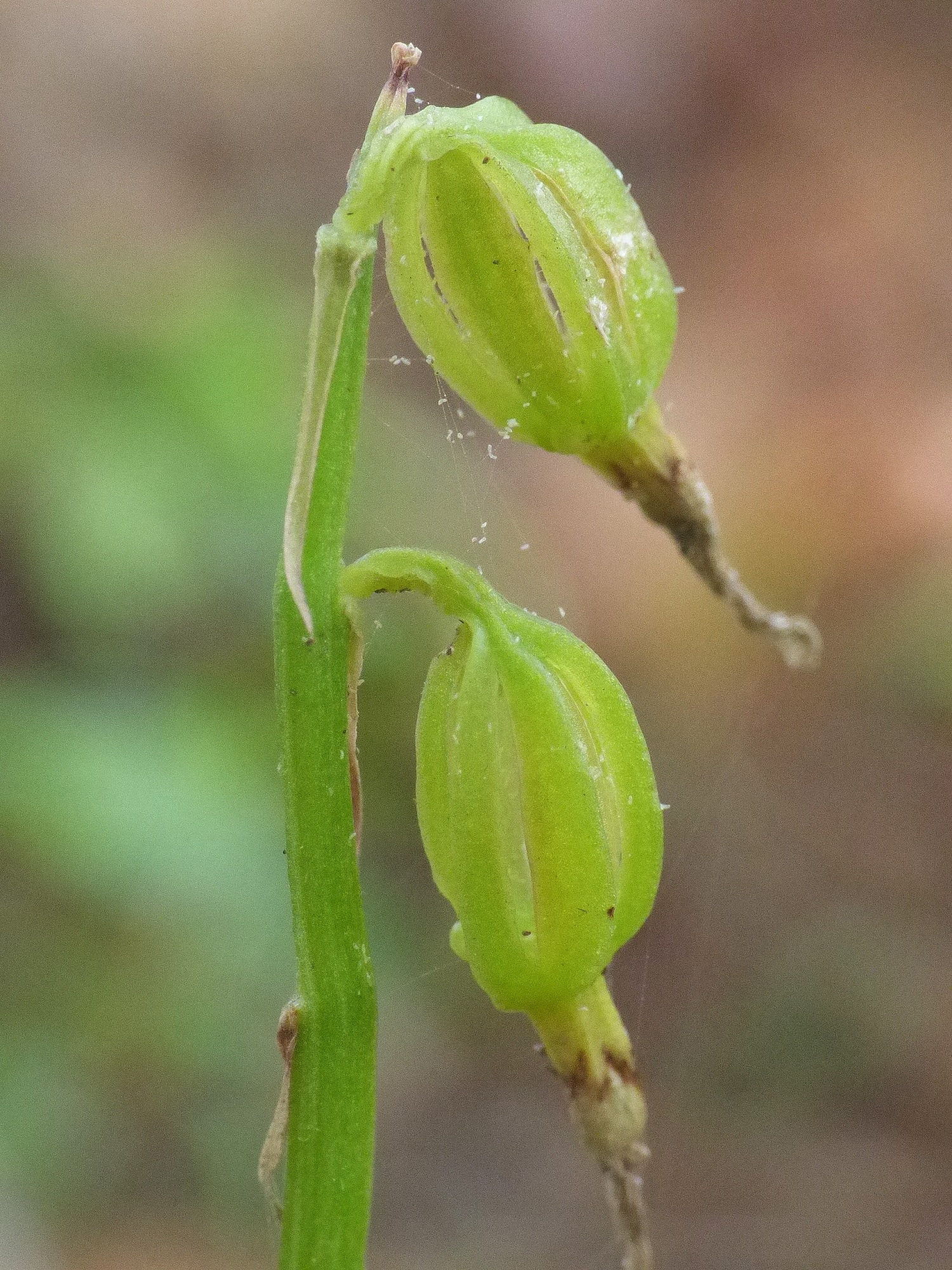
Fruits. Nala Village, Udaipur district, Rajasthan
