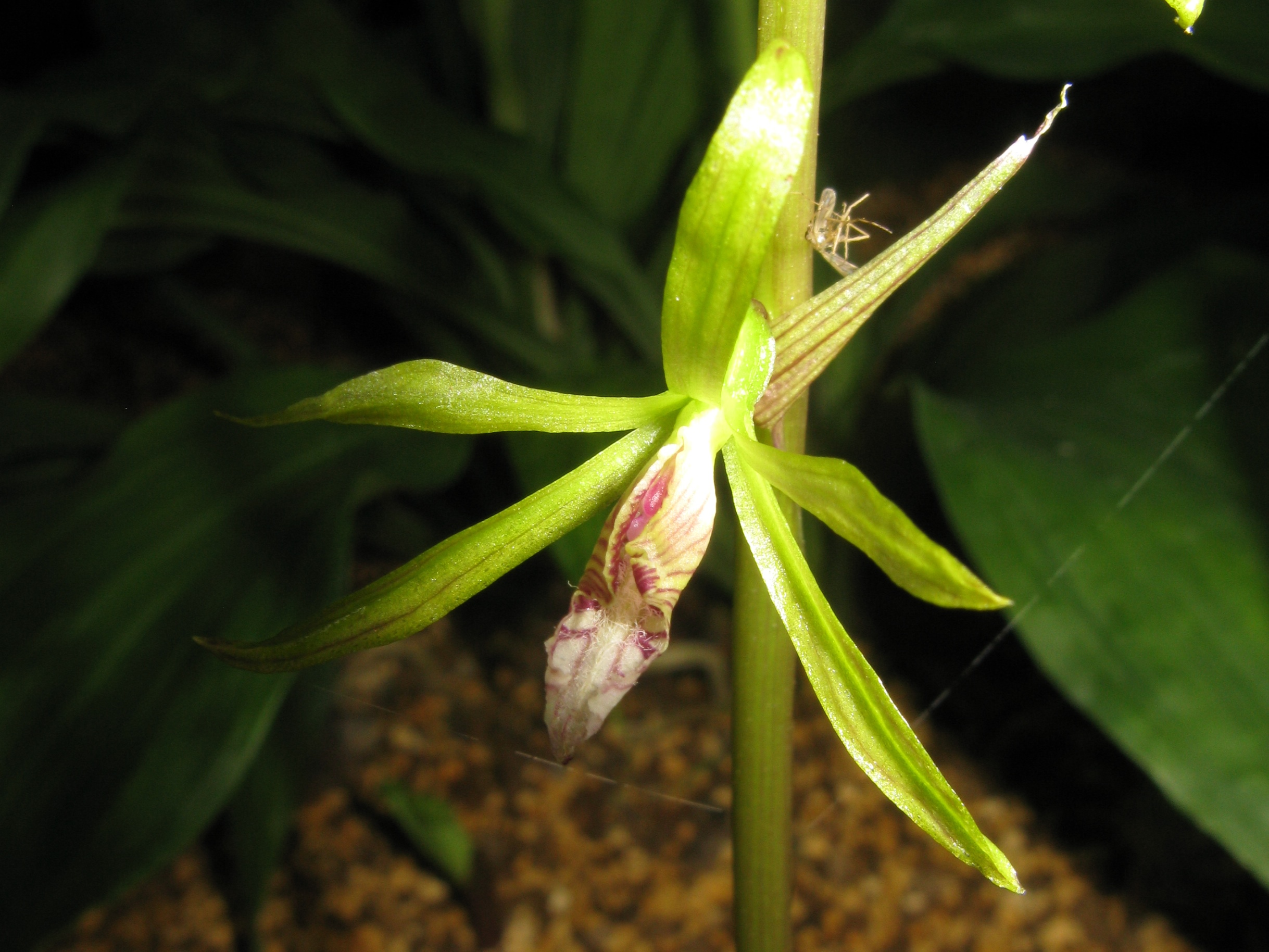
- Nervilia concolor in the Tsukuba Botanical Garden

Scientific classification
- Kingdom: Plantae
- Clade: Tracheophytes
- Clade: Angiosperms
- Clade: Monocots
- Order: Asparagales
- Family: Orchidaceae
- Subfamily: Epidendroideae
- Tribe: Nervilieae
- Subtribe: Nerviliinae; Schltr.
- Genus: Nervilia; Comm. ex Gaudich.

Species
- About 65, see text

Synonyms
- Aplostellis A.Rich.; Bolborchis Zoll. & Moritzi; Cordyla Blume (nom.illeg.); Haplostellis Endl.; Rophostemon Endl. (orth. var.); Roptrostemon Blume

= Nervilia =

Shield orchids

Genus of orchids

Nervilia, commonly known as shield orchids, is a genus of orchids with about 80 species widely distributed across most of sub-Saharan Africa, southern Asia (Saudi Arabia, Pakistan, India, China, Japan, Indochina, Indonesia, etc.), Australia, and various islands of the Pacific and Indian Oceans. Six species occur in Australia (2 or 3 of these endemic), with 16 in India, 10 in China and 5 in South Africa.

== Description ==
Orchids in the genus Nervilia are terrestrial, perennial, deciduous, sympodial herbs with an oval to almost spherical tuber and sometimes a few short roots. One or two flowers are borne on an erect, fleshy, leafless flowering stem. When flowering the plants lack leaves, but a single erect or ground-hugging leaf develops after the flower has fully opened. The leaves are usually wrinkled or crumpled with distinct, fan-like veins, giving rise to the genus name. The flowers are often short-lived, lasting for only a few days. The sepals and petals are similar, but the labellum is prominent and often composed of three lobes. The genus is poorly understood, mainly because the flower and leaf are present at different times, so that herbarium specimens are often incomplete.

== Taxonomy and naming ==
The genus Nervilia was first formally described in 1827 by Charles Gaudichaud-Beaupré after an unpublished description by Philibert Commerson. The description was published in his book Voyage autour du monde. The name Nervilia is derived from the Latin word nervus meaning "nerve", referring to the veined leaves.

Nervilia is the sole member of its subtribe, the Nerviliinae.

=== Species list ===
The following is a list of species of Nervilia recognised by the Plants of the World Online as of April 2025:

- Nervilia acuminata (J.J.Sm.) Schltr.
- Nervilia adolphi Schltr.
- Nervilia affinis Schltr.
- Nervilia alishanensis T.C.Shu, S.W.Chung & C.M.Kuo
- Nervilia appressifolia Aver. & V.C.Nguyen
- Nervilia ballii G.Will.
- Nervilia bandana (Blume) Schltr.
- Nervilia beumeei J.J.Sm.
- Nervilia bicarinata (Blume) Schltr.
- Nervilia borneensis (J.J.Sm.) Schltr.1
- Nervilia concolor (Blume) Schltr.
- Nervilia cumberlegii Seidenf. & Smitinand
- Nervilia dilatata (Blume) Schltr.
- Nervilia falcata (King & Pantl.) Schltr.
- Nervilia fordii (Hance) Schltr.
- Nervilia fuerstenbergiana Schltr.
- Nervilia futago S.W.Gale & T.Yukawa
- Nervilia gammieana (Hook.f.) Pfitzer
- Nervilia gleadowii A.N.Rao
- Nervilia gracilis Aver.
- Nervilia grandiflora Schltr.
- Nervilia hirsuta (Blume) Schltr.
- Nervilia hispida Blatt. & McCann
- Nervilia holochila (F.Muell.) Schltr.
- Nervilia hookeriana (King & Pantl.) Schltr.
- Nervilia hungii Tuyama
- Nervilia ignobilis Tuyama
- Nervilia infundibulifolia Blatt. & McCann
- Nervilia jacksoniae Rinehart & Fosberg
- Nervilia juliana (Roxb.) Schltr.
- Nervilia kasiensis S.W.Gale & Phaways.
- Nervilia khaoyaica Suddee, Wattana & S.W.Gale
- Nervilia khasiana (King & Pantl.) Schltr.
- Nervilia kotschyi (Rchb.f.) Schltr.
- Nervilia lanyuensis S.S.Ying
- Nervilia leguminosarum Jum. & H.Perrier
- Nervilia lilacea Jum. & H.Perrier
- Nervilia linearilabia T.P.Lin
- Nervilia mackinnonii (Duthie) Schltr.
- Nervilia macroglossa (Hook.f.) Schltr.
- Nervilia macrophylla Schltr.
- Nervilia maculata (E.C.Parish & Rchb.f.) Schltr.
- Nervilia maliana Schltr.
- Nervilia marmorata S.W.Gale, Suddee & Duangjai
- Nervilia multinervis Cavestro
- Nervilia muratana S.W.Gale & S.K.Wu
- Nervilia nipponica Makino
- Nervilia oxyglossa Fukuy.
- Nervilia palawensis Schltr.
- Nervilia pallidiflora Schltr.1
- Nervilia pangteyana Jalal, Kumar & G.S.Rawat
- Nervilia parishiana (King & Pantl.) Schltr.
- Nervilia pectinata P.J.Cribb
- Nervilia peltata B.Gray & D.L.Jones
- Nervilia petaloidea Carr
- Nervilia petraea (Afzel. ex Sw.) Summerh.
- Nervilia platychila Schltr.
- Nervilia plicata (Andrews) Schltr.
- Nervilia pubilabia T.C.Hsu, C.W.Chen & Luu
- Nervilia pudica (Ames) W.Suarez
- Nervilia punctata (Blume) Makino
- Nervilia purpureotincta T.C.Hsu
- Nervilia renschiana (Rchb.f.) Schltr.
- Nervilia sciaphila Schltr.
- Nervilia septemtrionarius T.P.Lin
- Nervilia seranica J.J.Sm.
- Nervilia shirensis (Rolfe) Schltr.
- Nervilia similis Schltr.
- Nervilia simplex (Thouars) Schltr.
- Nervilia singaporensis Niissalo
- Nervilia stolziana Schltr.
- Nervilia subintegra Summerh.
- Nervilia tahanshanensis T.P.Lin & W.M.Lin
- Nervilia taitoensis (Hayata) Schltr.
- Nervilia taiwaniana S.S.Ying
- Nervilia trangensis S.W.Gale, Suddee & Duangjai
- Nervilia trichophylla Fukuy.
- Nervilia umenoi Fukuy.
- Nervilia umphangensis Suddee, Rueangr. & S.W.Gale
- Nervilia uniflora (F.Muell.) Schltr.
- Nervilia viridis S.W.Gale, Watthana & Suddee
- Nervilia winckelii J.J.Sm.

Nervilia simplex var. himachalensis has been described, but is not accepted by Plants of the World Online.
