= Micropond =

Micropond may be

- a millionth of a pond, a unit of force
- a small pond in hydrology etc.
- MicroPond, a brand of Aquascape
- a digital organism simulator, Artificial life#Program-based
