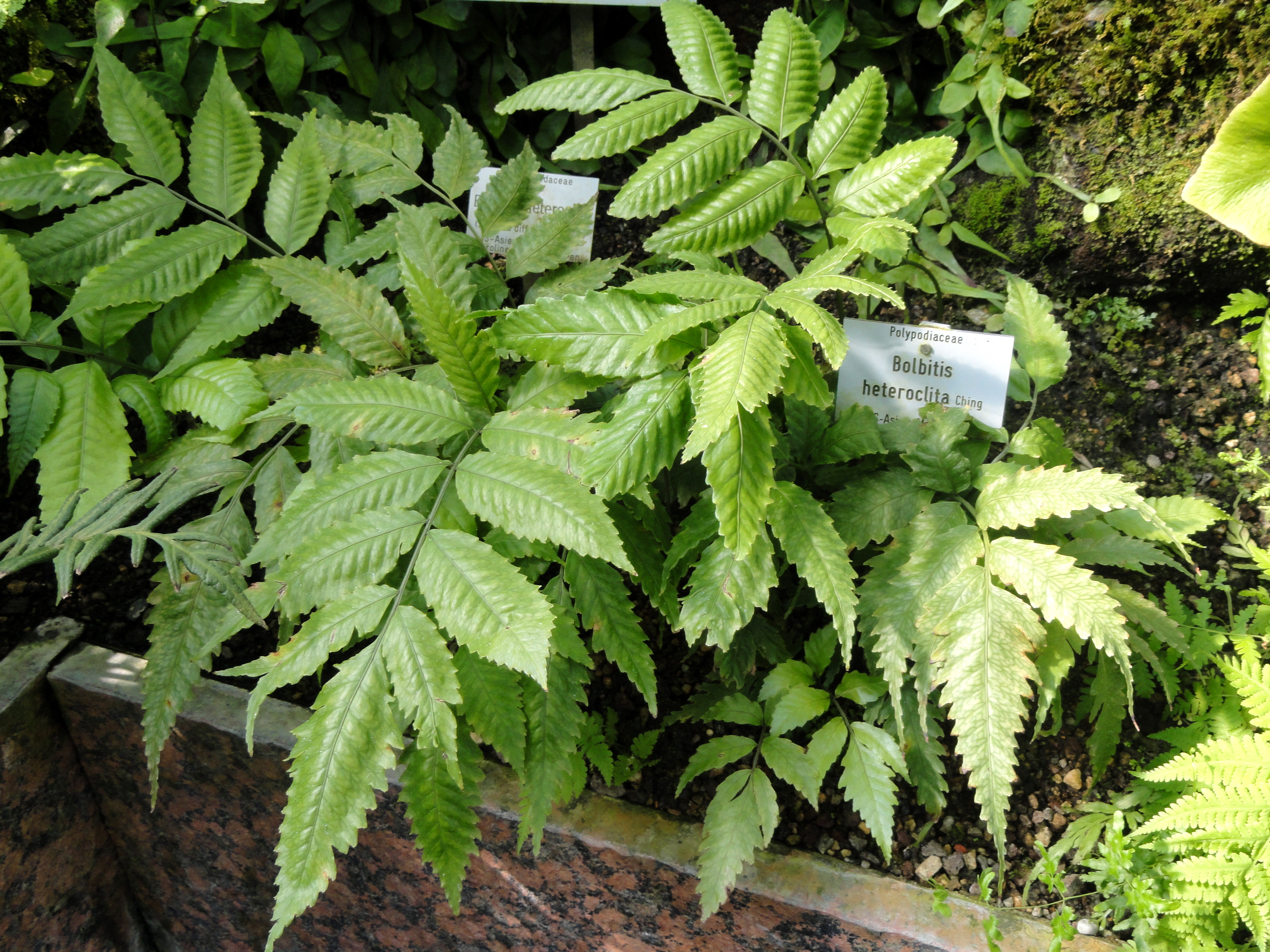
- Terrestrial habit of B. heteroclita
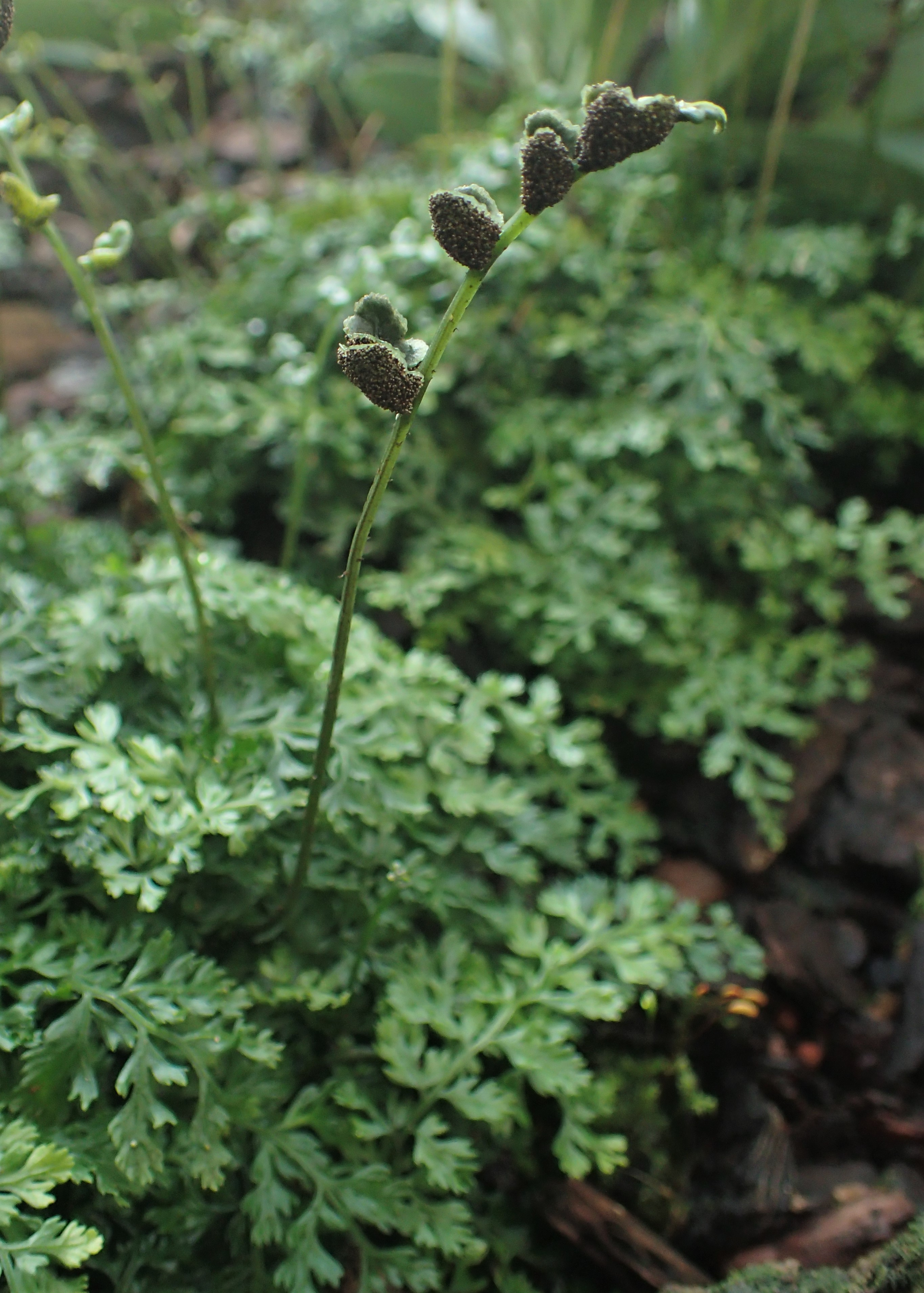
- B. heteroclita 'Difformis', a small-leafed variety from the Philippines

Scientific classification
- Kingdom: Plantae
- Clade: Tracheophytes
- Division: Polypodiophyta
- Class: Polypodiopsida
- Order: Polypodiales
- Suborder: Polypodiineae
- Family: Dryopteridaceae
- Genus: Bolbitis
- Species: B. heteroclita

Binomial name
- Bolbitis heteroclita (Presl) Ching

Synonyms
- Bolbitis asiatica

= Bolbitis heteroclita =

Species of aquatic plant

Bolbitis heteroclita is an aquatic fern species of Bolbitis, it is native to Southeast Asia and Melanesia, as well as parts of northeastern South Asia, southern East Asia, and Micronesia (Pohnpei and Kosrae). It is commonly cultivated as an aquatic ornamental for aquariums and garden ponds.

== Distribution ==
Bolbitis heteroclita is native to the subtropical and tropical regions Asia, Melanesia, and Micronesia; including Assam (India), Bangladesh, Nepal and Bhutan in South Asia; southern China (including Hainan), Taiwan, and the Ryukyu Islands (Japan) in East Asia; Myanmar, Thailand, and Vietnam in Mainland Southeast Asia; Malaysia, Indonesia, and the Philippines in Island Southeast Asia; Papua New Guinea and the Solomon Islands in Melanesia; and Pohnpei and Kosrae in the Caroline Islands in Micronesia.

== Cultivation ==
Bolbitis heteroclita is, fairly commonly, cultivated and sold as an ornamental plant for planted aquariums and garden ponds. It is one of two species of Bolbitis that are popular for use as freshwater aquarium plants, the second being Bolbitis heudelotii. Despite their relative popularity, these plants are not suitable for most novice aquarists. They can be unexpectedly sensitive in some cases, requiring minimal flow of water, with a gentle current; soft, acidic water is also preferred, ideally between 6.0 and 7.0, although there may be exceptions based on local water qualities. As these ferns are more adapted to a riparian, semi-submerged growth habit (rather than fully aquatic and submerged), it may be taxing on the plants to maintain them fully underwater, long-term. It is best to cultivate aquatic ferns, including Bolbitis, with their roots simply tied or attached to driftwood or rocks, and only a few inches beneath the water's surface. Their leaves are best maintained floating just at and above the waterline, where they can access fresh air while keeping their delicate, hair-like roots fully saturated.

The addition of carbon dioxide can greatly improve the health of all aquarium plants, especially epiphytes like ferns, with many online tutorials and videos demonstrating how to achieve this; for the average aquarist, though, this is inconceivable, if only initially, and may be considered a difficult feat for others. Thankfully, it is not a requirement. More importantly, weekly water changes of between 25 and 75% of the total aquarium volume are vital, dependent on bioload and vertebrate and fish count in the aquarium. Clean, renewed water has been shown to boost aquatic ferns' health, as it stirs the water column and cleans off the broad surfaces of the leaves, preventing the buildup of algae, mulm and detritus; this buildup can ultimately block sunlight and prevent photosynthesis, and even cause the plant to decline.

This species, however, is easy to grow as a terrestrial or immersed (in ponds) potted plant. It is remarkable for the resemblance of the fronds of a certain size to poison ivy leaves. Some plant nurseries and growers sell this under the former name Bolbitis asiatica.
