= Limnophila =

Limnophila may refer to:

- Limnophila (fly), a crane fly genus
  - Limnophila (subgenus), a subgenus in the fly taxonomy
- Limnophila (plant), an aquatic plant genus
