= L. indica =

L. indica may refer to:

- Lagerstroemia indica, the crape myrtle or crepe myrtle, a plant species
- Limnophila indica, a plant species in the genus Limnophila

== See also ==
- Indica (disambiguation)
