= Aquascaping =

Craft of designing and planting aquariums

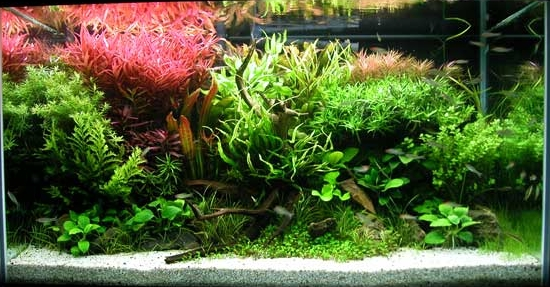
58 gallon (220 litre) freshwater aquascape

Aquascaping is the craft of arranging aquatic plants, as well as rocks, stones, cavework, or driftwood, in an aesthetically pleasing manner within an aquarium—in effect, gardening under water. Aquascape designs include a number of distinct styles, including the garden-like Dutch style and the Japanese-inspired nature style. Typically, an aquascape houses fish as well as plants, although it is possible to create an aquascape with plants only, or with rockwork or other hardscape and no plants.

Aquascaping appears to have begun to be a popular hobby in the 1930s in the Netherlands, following the introduction of the Dutch-style aquascaping techniques. With the increasing availability of mass-produced freshwater fishkeeping products and popularity of fishkeeping following the First World War, hobbyists began exploring the new possibilities of creating an aquarium that did not have fish as the main attraction.

Although the primary aim of aquascaping is to create an artful underwater landscape, the technical aspects of tank maintenance and the growth requirements of aquatic plants are also taken into consideration. Many factors must be balanced in the closed system of an aquarium tank to ensure the success of an aquascape. These factors include filtration, maintaining carbon dioxide at levels sufficient to support photosynthesis underwater, substrate and fertilization, lighting, and algae control.

Aquascape hobbyists trade plants, conduct contests, and share photographs and information via the Internet. The United States-based Aquatic Gardeners Association has about 1,200 members.

== Designs ==
=== Dutch style ===
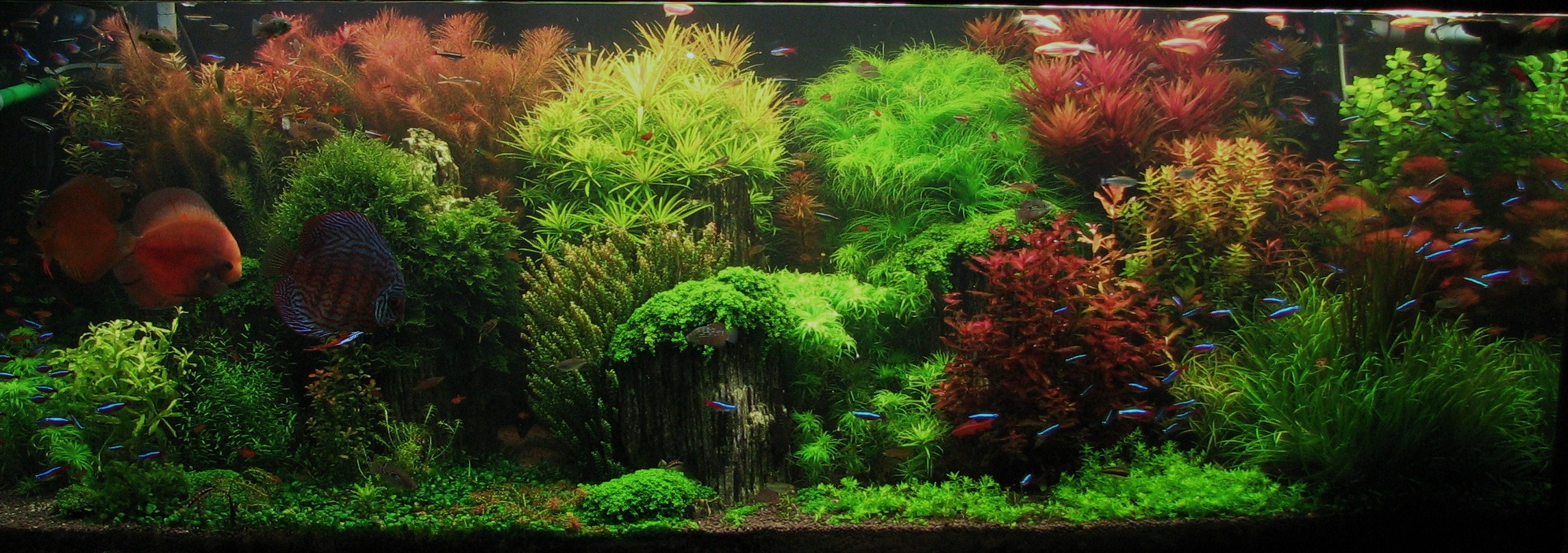
Dutch style aquascape

The Dutch aquarium employs a lush arrangement in which multiple types of plants having diverse leaf colors, sizes, and textures are displayed much as terrestrial plants are shown in a flower garden. This style was developed in the Netherlands starting in the 1930s, as freshwater aquarium equipment became commercially available. It emphasizes plants located on terraces of different heights, and frequently omits rocks and driftwood. Linear rows of plants running left-to-right are referred to as "Dutch streets". Although many plant types are used, one typically sees neatly trimmed groupings of plants with fine, feathery foliage, such as Limnophila aquatica and various types of Hygrophila, along with the use of red-leaved Alternanthera reineckii, Ammania gracilis, and assorted Rotala for color highlights. More than 80% of the aquarium floor is covered with plants, and little or no substrate is left visible. Tall growing plants that cover the back glass originally served the purpose of hiding bulky equipment behind the tank.

=== Nature style ===
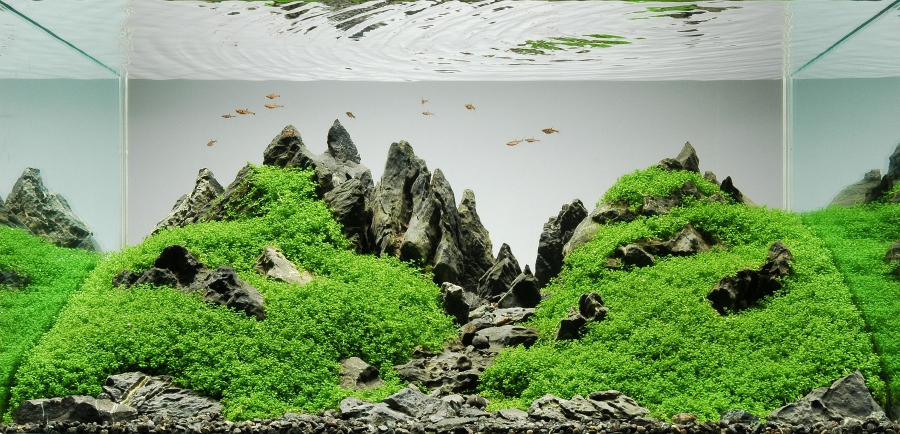
A nature style aquascape, suggesting mountains

A contrasting approach is the "nature aquarium" or Japanese style, introduced in the 1990s by Takashi Amano. Amano's three-volume series, Nature Aquarium World, sparked a wave of interest in aquarium gardening, and he has been cited as having "set a new standard in aquarium management". Amano also worked in natural-landscape photography, and used multi-exposure techniques to photograph aquariums better, and has been described as a portrait photographer of aquariums. Amano's compositions drew on Japanese gardening techniques that attempt to mimic natural landscapes by the asymmetrical arrangement of masses of relatively few species of plants, and which set rules governing carefully selected stones or driftwood, usually with a single focal point positioned to reflect the golden ratio. The objective is to evoke a terrestrial landscape in miniature, rather than a colourful garden. This style draws particularly from the Japanese aesthetic concepts of Wabi-sabi (侘寂), which focuses on transience and minimalism as sources of beauty. Plants with small leaves like Glossostigma elatinoides, Eleocharis acicularis, Eleocharis parvula, Echinodorus tenellus, Hemianthus callitrichoides, Riccia fluitans, small aquatic ferns, Staurogyne repens, and Java moss (Versicularia dubyana or Taxiphyllum barbieri) are often used to emulate grass or moss. Colours are more limited than in the Dutch style, and the hardscape is not completely covered. Fish, or freshwater shrimp such as Caridina multidentata and Neocaridina davidi, are usually selected to complement the plants and control algae, but for reasons of minimalism the number of species are often limited. Smaller species may also be used to give the impression of a larger aquarium. The Nature style can be broken down into three different sub-styles: Ryoboku (流木), Iwagumi (岩組), and diorama.

==== Ryoboku ====
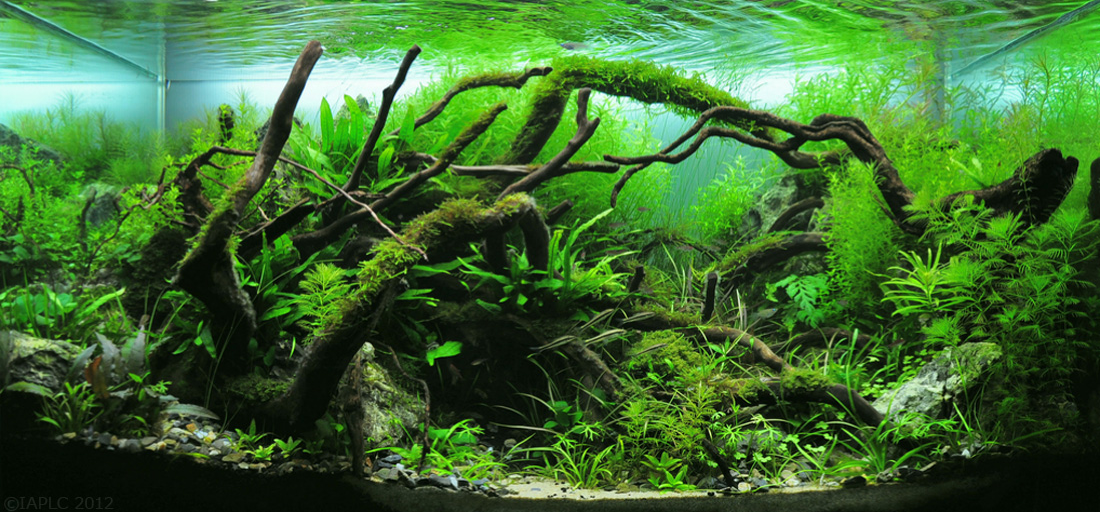
Ryoboku style aquascape, with overhanging wood evoking an overgrown cave and decaying trees

This aquascape style is based on using wood as the main hardscape material. The word Ryoboku (流木), which can be translated into English "driftwood", represents aquariums set up with wood. There are many types of wood that can be used, including driftwood, bogwood, Manzanita wood and Redmoor roots. Often the wood will protrude from the water surface, which adds an enhanced sense of nature. Moss and other epiphyte plants are also commonly used, adding a beautiful sense of maturity and aged appearance. Only one type of wood is usually used in order to make it more natural. Stones can also be used, but these are not main focus.

==== Iwagumi ====
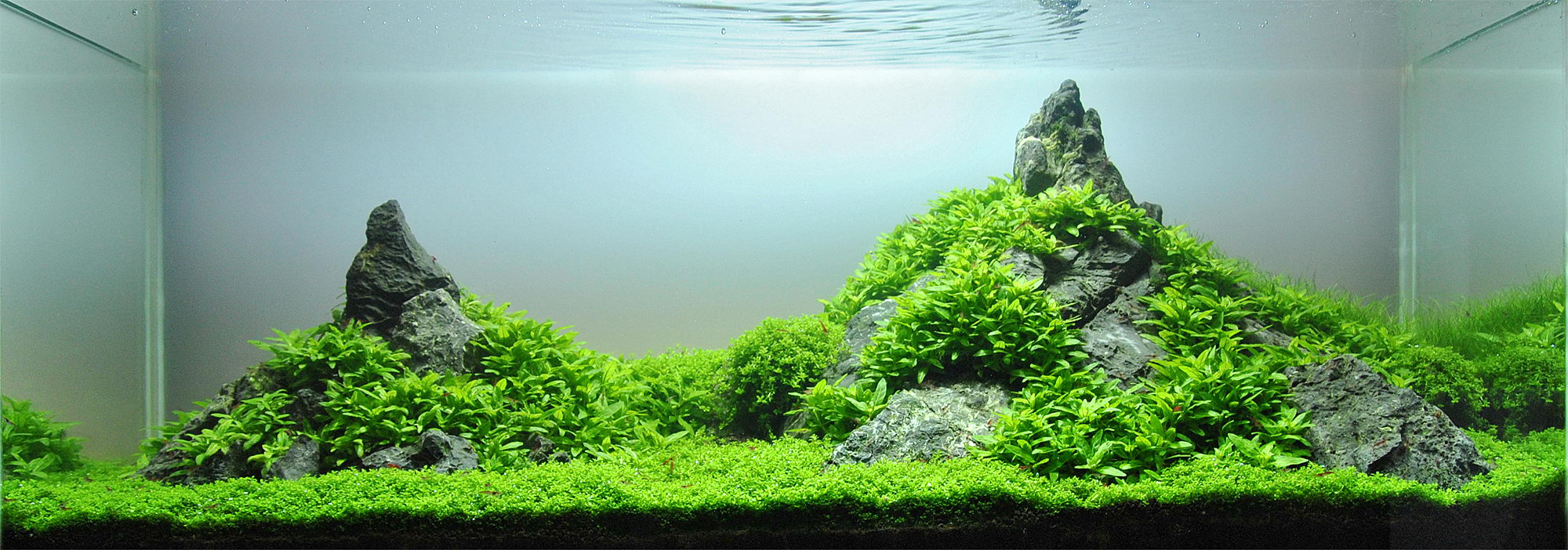
Iwagumi style aquascape, with the Oyaishi stone at the right

The Iwagumi (岩組) term itself comes from the Japanese "rock formation" and refers to a layout where stones play a leading role. In the Iwagumi style, each stone has a name and a specific role. Rocks provide the bony structure of the aquascape and the typical geometry employs a design with three main stones, with one larger stone and two other smaller stones, although additional rocks can also be used. The Oyaishi (親石), or main stone, is placed slightly off-center in the tank, and Soeishi (添石), or accompanying stones, are grouped near it, while Fukuseki (副石), or secondary stones, are arranged in subordinate positions. The location of the focal point of the display, determined largely by the asymmetric placement of the Oyaishi, is considered important, and follows ratios that reflect Pythagorean tuning.

==== Diorama ====
This nature aquascape sub-style uses a physical landscape or fantasy scene as the main source of inspiration. This aquascape style typically focuses on the hardscape in order to create a landscape effect with planting often limited to very small textures and a few species in order to maintain a sense of scale. The hardscape layouts are often highly complex underwater structures that take months to create rocks or wood being painstakingly glued together.

=== Jungle style ===
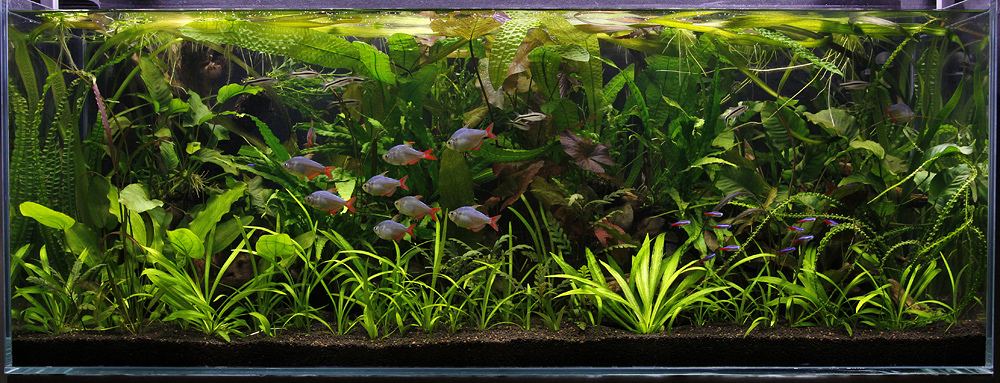
Jungle style aquascape

Some hobbyists also refer to a "jungle" (or "wild jungle") style, separate from either the Dutch or nature styles, and incorporating some of the features of them both. The plants are left to assume a natural, untrimmed look. Jungle style aquascapes usually have little or no visible hardscape material, as well as limited open space. Bold, coarser leaf shapes, such as Echinodorus bleheri, are used to provide a wild, untamed appearance. Unlike nature style, the jungle style does not follow clean lines, or employ fine textures. A jungle canopy effect can be obtained using combinations of darker substrates, tall plants growing up to the surface, and floating plants that block light, offering a dappled lighting effect. Other plants used in jungle style aquascapes include Microsorum pteropus, Bolbitis heudelotii, Vallisneria americana, Crinum species, Aponogeton species, Echinodorus species, Sagittaria subulata, Hygrophila pinnatifida, Anubias species, and Limnobium laevigatum.

=== Biotopes ===
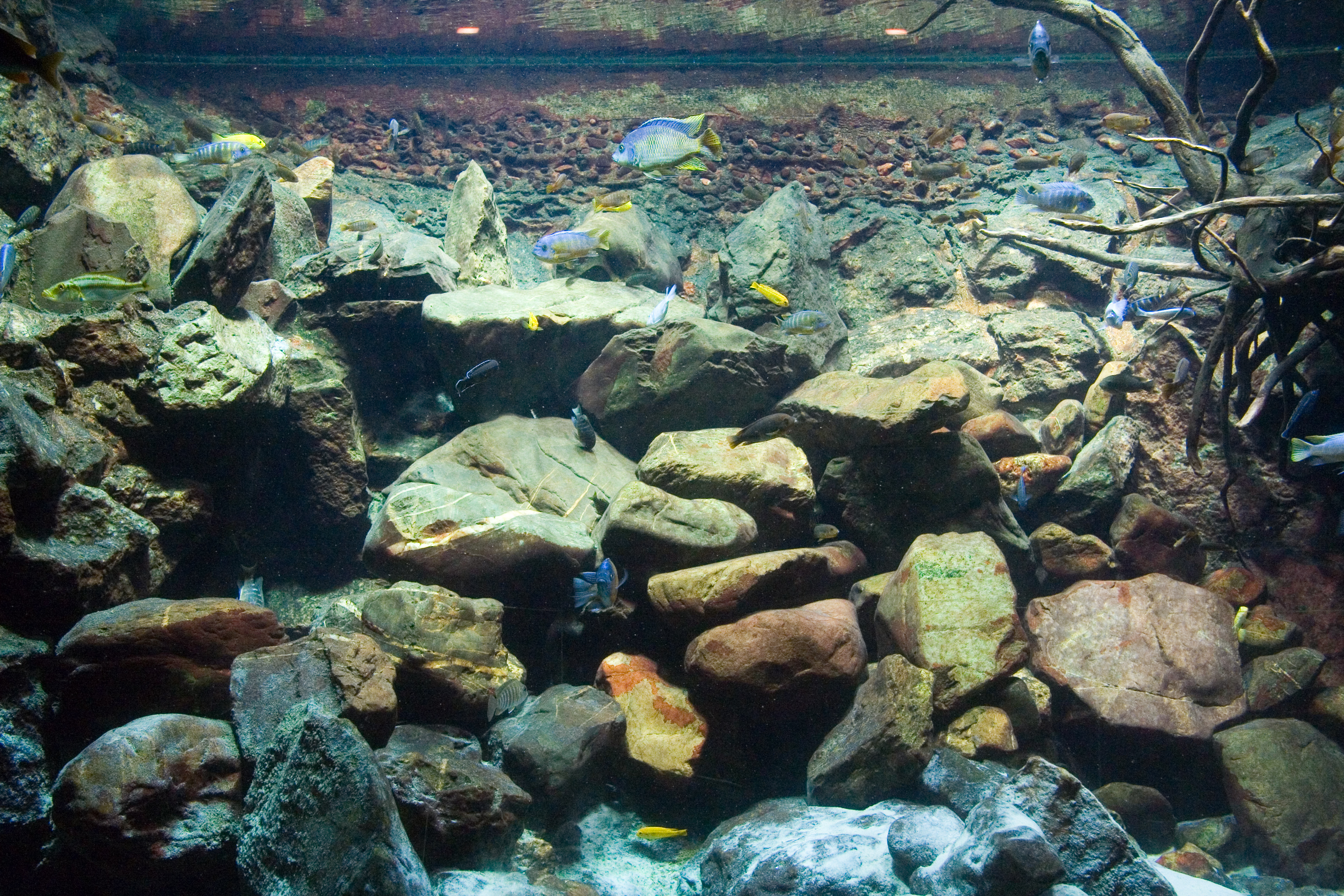
This Lake Malawi biotope with cichlids is an exhibit of Artis, a zoo in Amsterdam. Note the oligotrophic water and absence of green plants in this rift lake habitat.

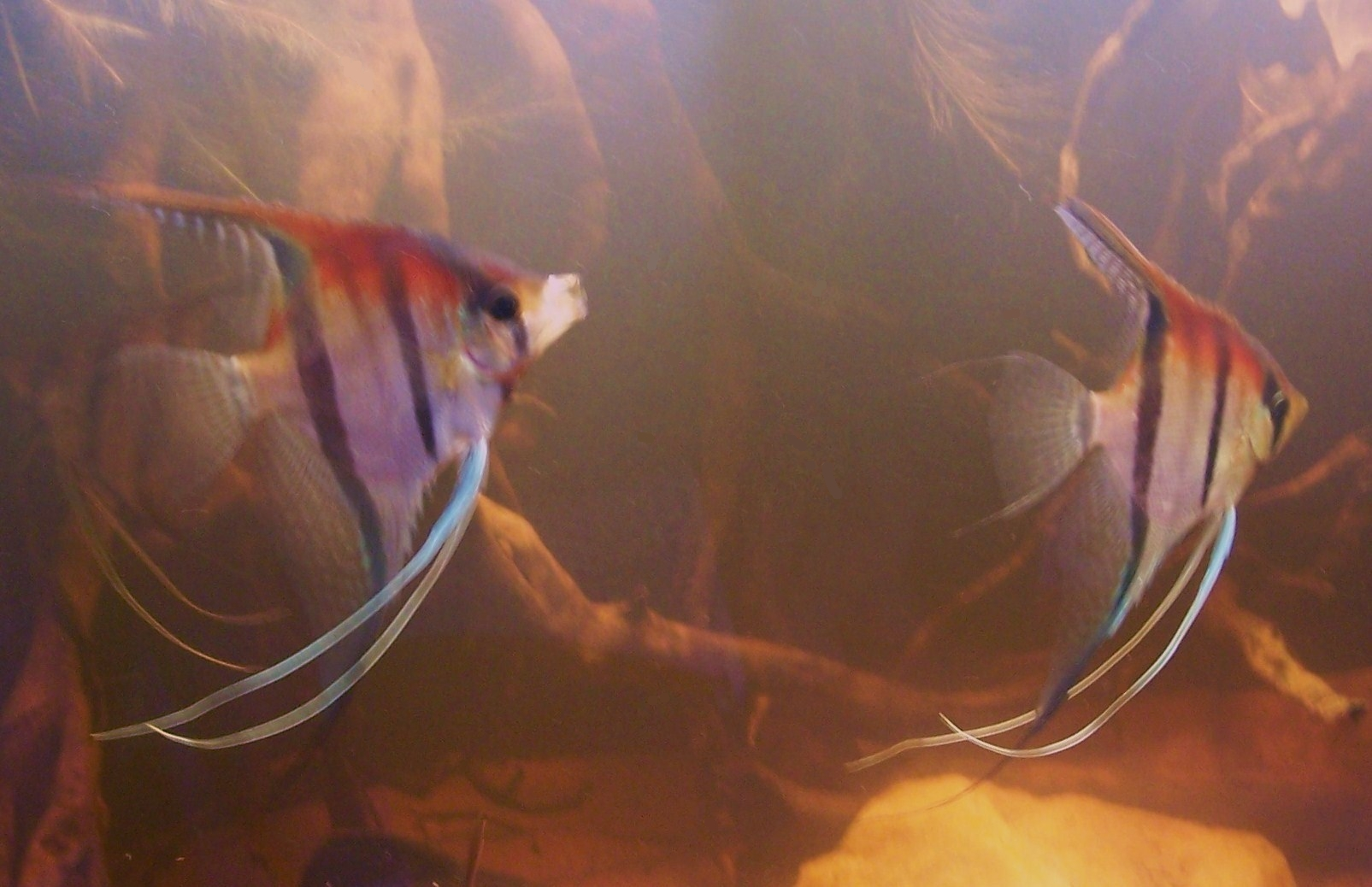
Part of a blackwater biotope, showing darkened water

The styles above often combine plant and animal species based on the desired visual impact without regard to geographic origin. Instead, Biotope aquariums are designed to replicate a particular aquatic habitat at a particular geographic location, not necessarily to provide a gardenlike display. Plants and fish need not be present, but if they are, they must match what would be found in nature in the habitat being represented. The gravel, hardscape, and chemical composition of the water must also represent the habitat desired. By including only organisms that naturally exist together, biotopes can be used to study ecological interactions in a relatively natural setting.

For instance, blackwater biotope aquariums mimic a blackwater watercourse, pond, or swamp. Blackwater aquariums resemble the native environment of many popular aquarium fish. The chemical composition of blackwater rivers in the Amazon rainforest is often used as a reference. They contain recalcitrant (slow-decaying) organics like driftwood, leaf litter, and pinecones. These organics release tannins, humics and fulvics, which darken and acidify the water. The water is also soft water, low in dissolved minerals. There is evidence that tannins have anti-fungal properties and can boost fish immune systems. This environment is less stressful and more conducive to natural behavior and breeding. Blackwater aquaria may not contain plants; if they do, they use plants that thrive in the low light levels caused by the dark water. Some aquarists may decrease artificial lighting further to mimic the dark conditions fish are accustomed to. A water pump may be added to help with water flow, similar to the conditions of a slow-moving river.

=== Paludariums ===
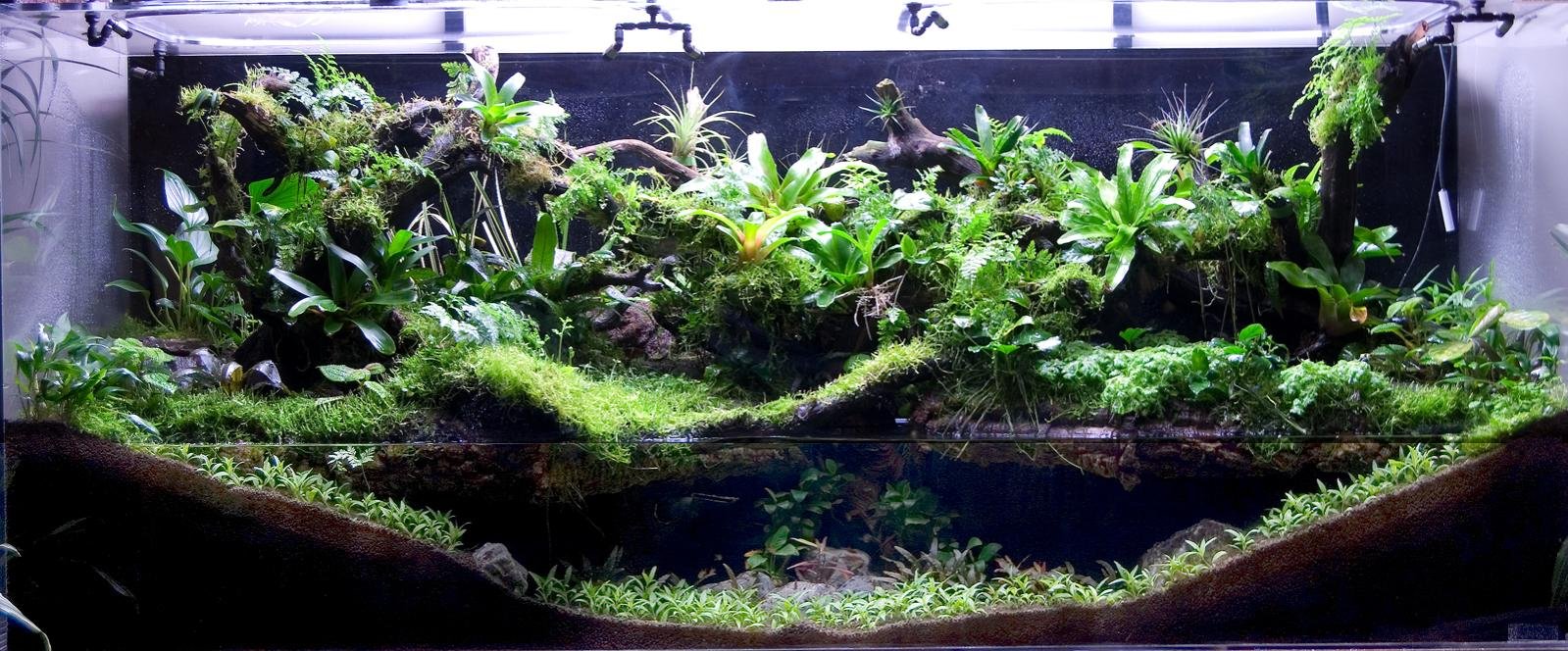
A paludarium

A paludarium is an aquarium that combines water and land inside the same environment. These designs can represent habitats including tropical rainforests, jungles, riverbanks, bogs, or even the beach. In a paludarium, part of the aquarium is underwater, and part is above water. Substrate is built up so that some "land" regions are raised above the waterline, and the tank is only partially filled with water. This allows plants, such as Cyperus alternifolius and Spathiphyllum wallisii, as well as various Anubias and some bromeliads, to grow emersed, with their roots underwater but their tops in the air, as well as completely submersed. In some configurations, plants that float on the surface of the water, such as Eichhornia crassipes and Pistia stratiotes, can be displayed to full advantage. Unlike other aquarium setups, paludariums are particularly well-suited to keeping amphibians.

A riparium is a paludarium that imitates a riparian area, the bank of a watercourse. The plants are often in floating pots attached to the rear wall. It may be left open, with the plants growing out of the tank.

=== Saltwater reefs ===
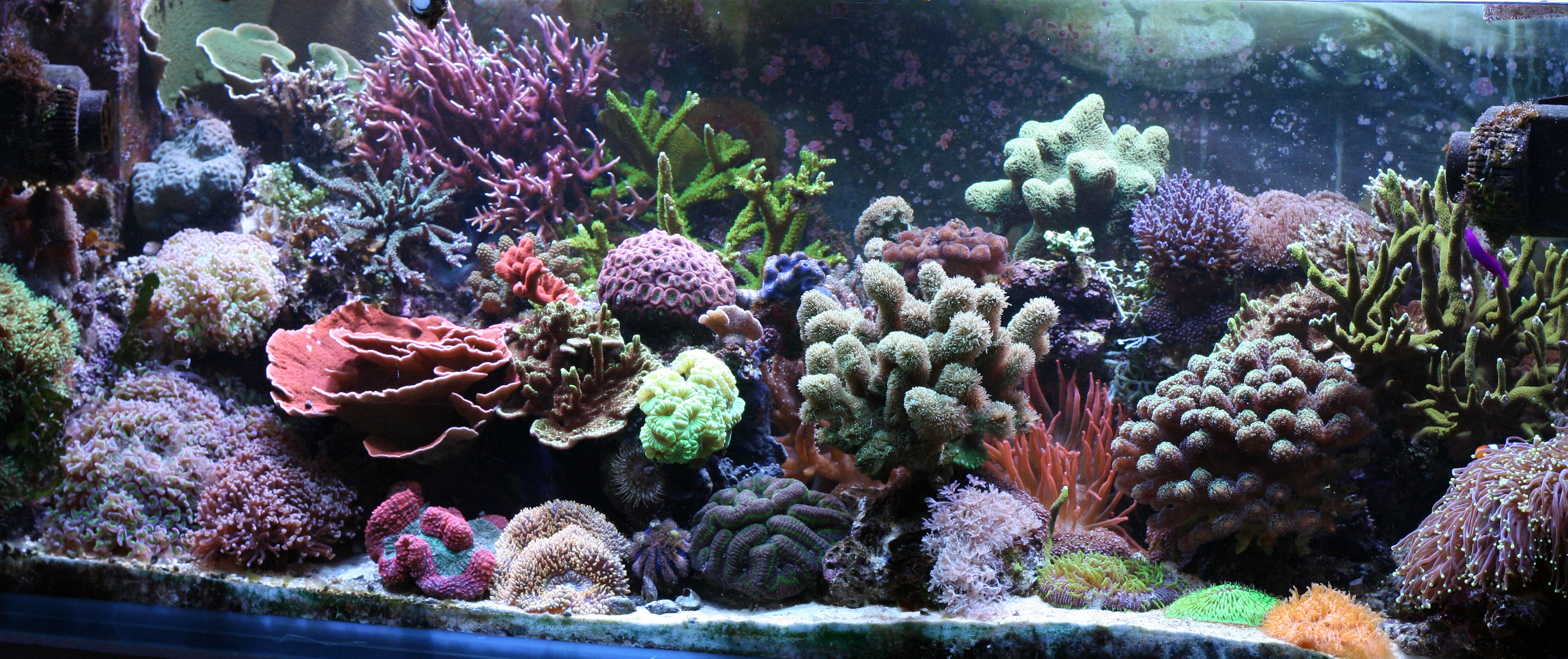
Reef aquascape

Dutch and nature style aquascapes are traditionally freshwater systems. In contrast, relatively few ornamental plants can be grown in a saltwater aquarium. Saltwater aquascaping typically centers, instead, on mimicking a reef. An arrangement of live rock forms the main structure of this aquascape, and it is populated by corals and other marine invertebrates as well as coralline algae and macroalgae, which together serve much the same aesthetic role as freshwater plants.

Lighting plays a particularly significant role in the reef aquascape. Many corals, as well as tridacnid clams, contain symbiotic fluorescent algae-like dinoflagellates called zooxanthellae. By providing intense lighting supplemented in the ultraviolet wavelengths, reef aquarists not only support the health of these invertebrates, but also elicit particularly bright colors emitted by the fluorescent microorganisms.

== Techniques ==
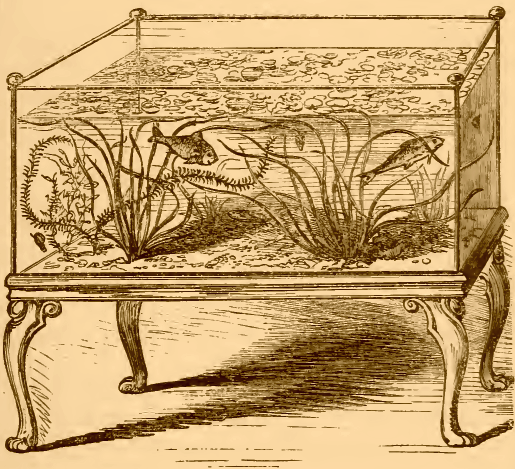
From the Victorian era, aquarists have planted their tanks, as seen in this 1856 example containing Vallisneria spiralis.

In addition to design, freshwater aquascaping also requires specific methods to maintain healthy plants underwater. Plants are often trimmed to obtain the desired shape, and they can be positioned by tying them in place inconspicuously with thread. Most serious aquascapers use aquarium-safe fertilizers, commonly in liquid or tablet form, to help the plants fill out more rapidly. Some aquarium substrates containing laterite also provide nutrients. Reverse osmosis filters may be used mitigate damaging effects of hard water on sensitive animals and plants, and filtered water is remineralized to the ideal hardness.

It is also necessary to support photosynthesis by providing light. A variety of lighting systems may be used to produce the full spectrum of light, usually at 2–4 watts per gallon (0.5–1 watts per litre). Lights are usually controlled by a timer that allows the plants to be acclimated to a set cycle. Alternatively, some aquarists opt for placing their aquariums near windows (usually north or northeastern-facing, to avoid harsh direct sun), without artificial lighting, thus giving plants a more consistent, natural light cycle.

Depending on the number of plants and fish, the aquascape may also require carbon dioxide supplementation. This can be accomplished with a simple homemade system (using a bottle filled with yeast, warm water, and sugar, connected to an airstone in the aquarium), or, more commonly, with a pressurized CO_{2} tank that diffuses a set amount of carbon dioxide into the aquarium water. Both methods have benefits and challenges, with the use of pressurized carbon dioxide necessitating the refilling of tanks periodically, usually at a gas supplier, and yeast-sugar methods requiring general maintenance and more frequent changing-out.

Algae (including cyanobacteria, as well as true algae) is considered distracting and unwanted in aquascaping, and is controlled in several ways. Algae is most commonly caused by an excess of nutrients and waste, so aquarists will perform water changes to lower the nitrates present. Another method is the use of animals that consume algae, such as some fish (notably cyprinids of the genera Crossocheilus and Gyrinocheilus, and catfish of the genera Ancistrus, Hypostomus, and Otocinclus), shrimp, or snails, to clean the algae that collect on the leaves. A third method is using adequate light and CO_{2} to promote rapid growth of desired plants, while controlling nutrient levels, to ensure that the plants utilize all fertilizer without leaving nutrients to support algae. When adding new fish to a tank, aquascapers may also disinfect their plants by using diluted hydrogen peroxide or bleach, as unknown plants may carry undesired species of algae, as well as potential snail eggs or worms.

Although serious aquascapers often use a considerable amount of equipment to provide lighting, filtration, and CO_{2} supplementation to the tank, some hobbyists choose instead to maintain plants with a minimum of technology, and some have reported success in producing lush plant growth this way. This approach, sometimes called the "Walstad Method" and popularized by Diana Walstad, can include the use of soil in place of aquarium gravel, the elimination of CO_{2} apparatus and most filtration, and limited lighting. Only a few fish or shrimp are kept to limit the quantity of fish waste. Plants are used to perform the water-cleansing role typically played by aquarium filters by utilizing what fish waste there is as fertilizer.

== Contests ==
Early Dutch hobbyists began the practice of aquascape contests, with over 100 local clubs. Judges had to go through about three years of training and pass examinations in multiple disciplines in order to qualify. This competition continues to be held every year, under the auspices of the National Aquarium Society. There are three rounds, beginning with contests in local clubs. First-place local winners are entered in the second round, held in fifteen districtkeuring (districts). The winners at that level are then entered in the third round, which is the national championship.

In the Dutch contest, the focus is not only on composition, but also on the biological well-being of the aquarium's inhabitants. Most points are, in fact, awarded for such biological criteria as fish health, plant health, and water quality. Unlike contests in other countries, the judges travel to each contestant's home to evaluate the tank, where they measure the water parameters themselves.

The Aquatic Gardeners Association, based in the United States, Aqua Design Amano, based in Japan, and AquaticScapers Europe, based in Germany, also conduct annual freshwater aquascaping contests. Entries from around the world are submitted as photographs and explanatory text online.

The Aquatic Gardeners Association contest is judged on:

- Overall impression (Maximum 35 points)
- Composition, balance, use of space and use of color (Maximum 30 points)
- Selection and use of materials (Maximum 20 points)
- Viability of aquascape (Maximum 15 points)

The International Aquatic Plant Layout Contest (IAPLC), run by Aqua Design Amano (ADA), is the largest aquascaping competition, with 1450 online entries in 2024. Winners of the IAPLC include Josh Sim (2017, 2019), Takayuki Fukada (2015, 2016), and Luis Carlos Galarraga (2024).

There are also smaller contests conducted by Acuavida in Spain, by the Greek Aquarist's Board, and by the French association Aquagora.

== Public aquariums ==
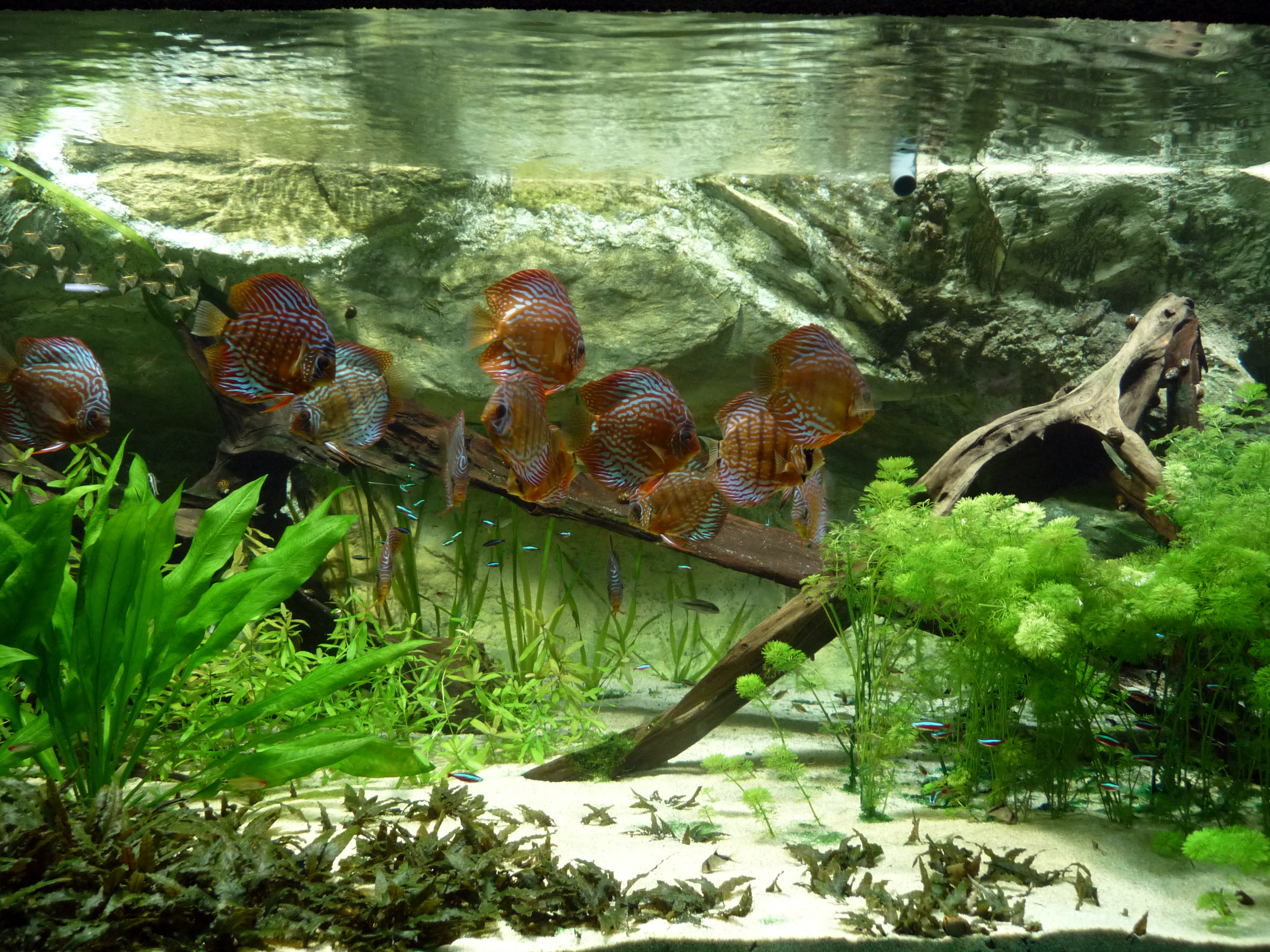
Discus and cardinal tetras in an Amazon River basin display at the Palais de la Porte Dorée aquarium in Paris

Large public aquariums sometimes use aquascaping as part of their displays. As early as the 1920s, the New York Aquarium included a moray eel display tank that was decorated with calcareous tufa rock, arranged to resemble a coral reef, and supporting some stony corals and sea fans. Because they typically present wildlife from a particular habitat, modern day displays are often created to be biologically accurate biotopes.

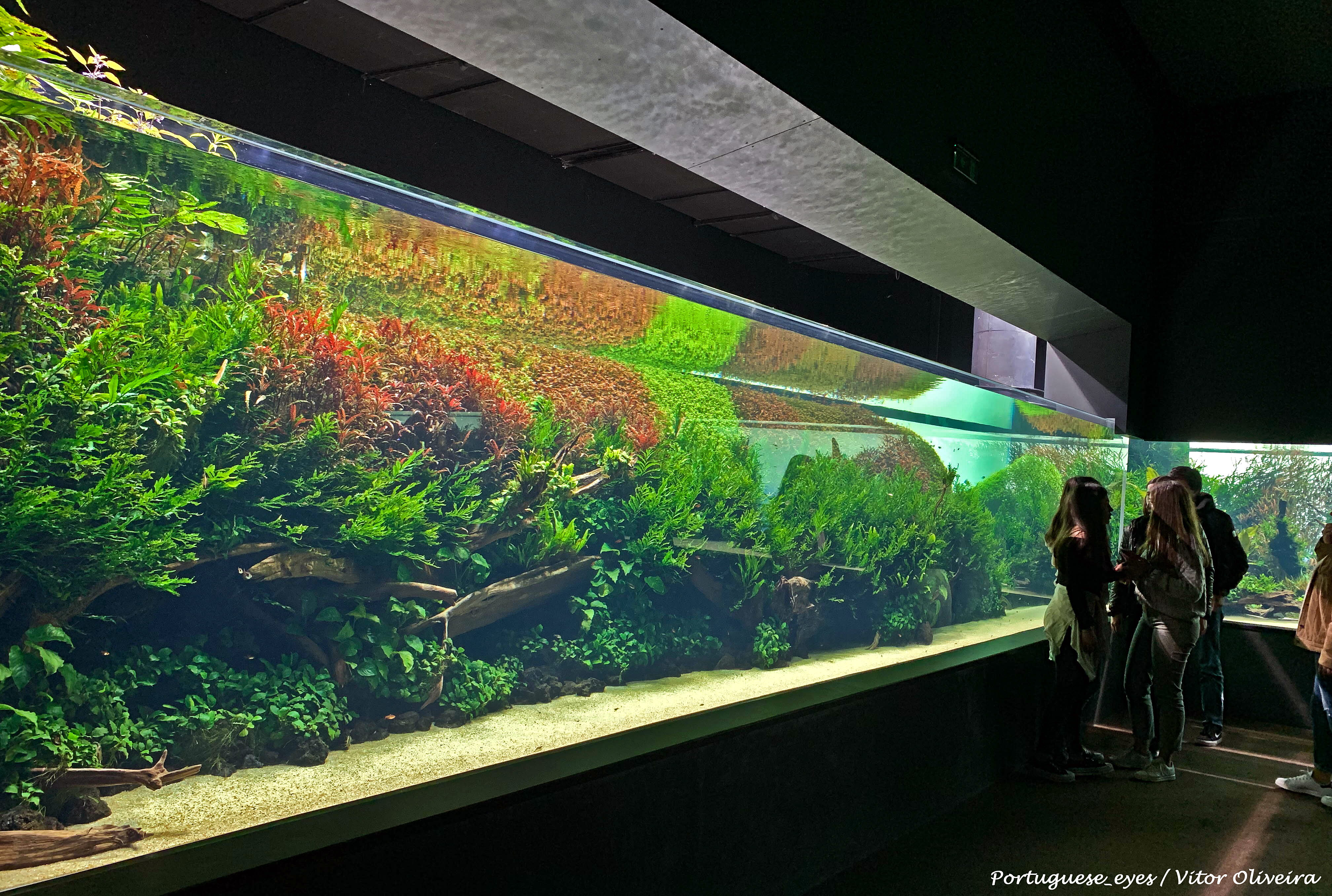
Forests Underwater by Takashi Amano at the Lisbon Oceanarium

The largest aquascape of the Japanese nature aquarium style in a public aquarium was situated in the Lisbon Oceanarium in Portugal. The exhibit is called "Forests Underwater by Takashi Amano". It was initially intended to be temporary, but has now become a permanent exhibition at the Lisbon Oceanarium, residing there for over 9 years as of 2024.

== See also ==
- Aquarium
- Terrarium (land)
