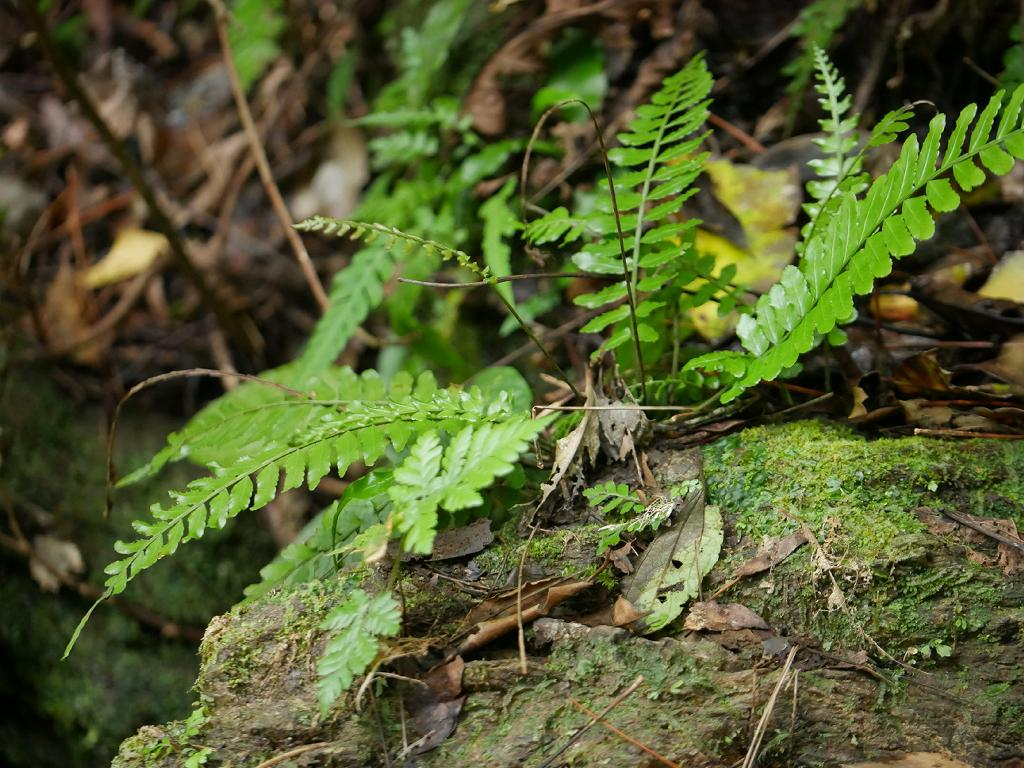

Conservation status
- Least Concern (IUCN 3.1)

Scientific classification
- Kingdom: Plantae
- Clade: Tracheophytes
- Division: Polypodiophyta
- Class: Polypodiopsida
- Order: Polypodiales
- Suborder: Polypodiineae
- Family: Dryopteridaceae
- Genus: Bolbitis
- Species: B. appendiculata

Binomial name
- Bolbitis appendiculata (Willd.) K.Iwats.

Synonyms
- List: Acrostichum appendiculatum Willd.; Gymnogramma auriculatum Kaulf.; Polybotrya marginata Blume; Acrostichum hamiltonianum Wall.; Acrostichum setosum Wall.; Acrostichum wightianum Wall.; Egenolfia hamiltoniana Schott; Polybotrya appendiculata (Willd.) J.Sm.; Acrostichum alatum Roxb.; Lacaussadea appendiculata (Willd.) Gaudich.; Egenolfia gaudichaudiana Fée; Egenolfia marginata (Blume) Fée; Egenolfia montana (Gaudich.) Fée; Egenolfia schottii Fée; Lacaussadea montana Gaudich.; Polybotrya gaudichaudiana (Fée) T.Moore; Polybotrya montana (Gaudich.) T.Moore; Egenolfia appendiculata (Willd.) J.Sm.; Acrostichum alatum f. minutum Kuhn; Polybotrya appendiculata var. marginata C.Chr.; Egenolfia aspleniifolia var. moniliformis Tardieu & C.Chr.; Egenolfia aspleniifolia var. montana (Gaudich.) Tardieu & C.Chr.; Egenolfia appendiculata var. moniliformis (Tardieu & C.Chr.) Tardieu & C.Chr.; Egenolfia appendiculata var. montana (Gaudich.) Tardieu & C.Chr.; Egenolfia keralensis B.K.Nayar & Kaur; Egenolfia crenata Ching & P.S.Chiu ex Ching & C.H.Wang; Bolbitis appendiculata var. kummatta B.K.Nayar & Geev.

= Bolbitis appendiculata =

Species of fern

Bolbitis appendiculata is a lithophyte in the family Dryopteridaceae, seen in evergreen forests. It is found in India, Sri Lanka, Bangladesh, Borneo, Myanmar, Cambodia, China, Hong Kong, Japan, Java, Malaysia, Philippines, Sumatra, Taiwan, Thailand and Vietnam. Fronds are dimorphic, scaly beneath and hairy above. Sterile lamina dark green and simply pinnate, stalked, oblong, serrate with larger pinnae in the middle, reduced towards both ends. Fertile lamina narrower, elliptic, obtuse and base unequal. Dark brown to black sporangia covers almost the entirety of the underside of the leaf surface (acrostichoid).
