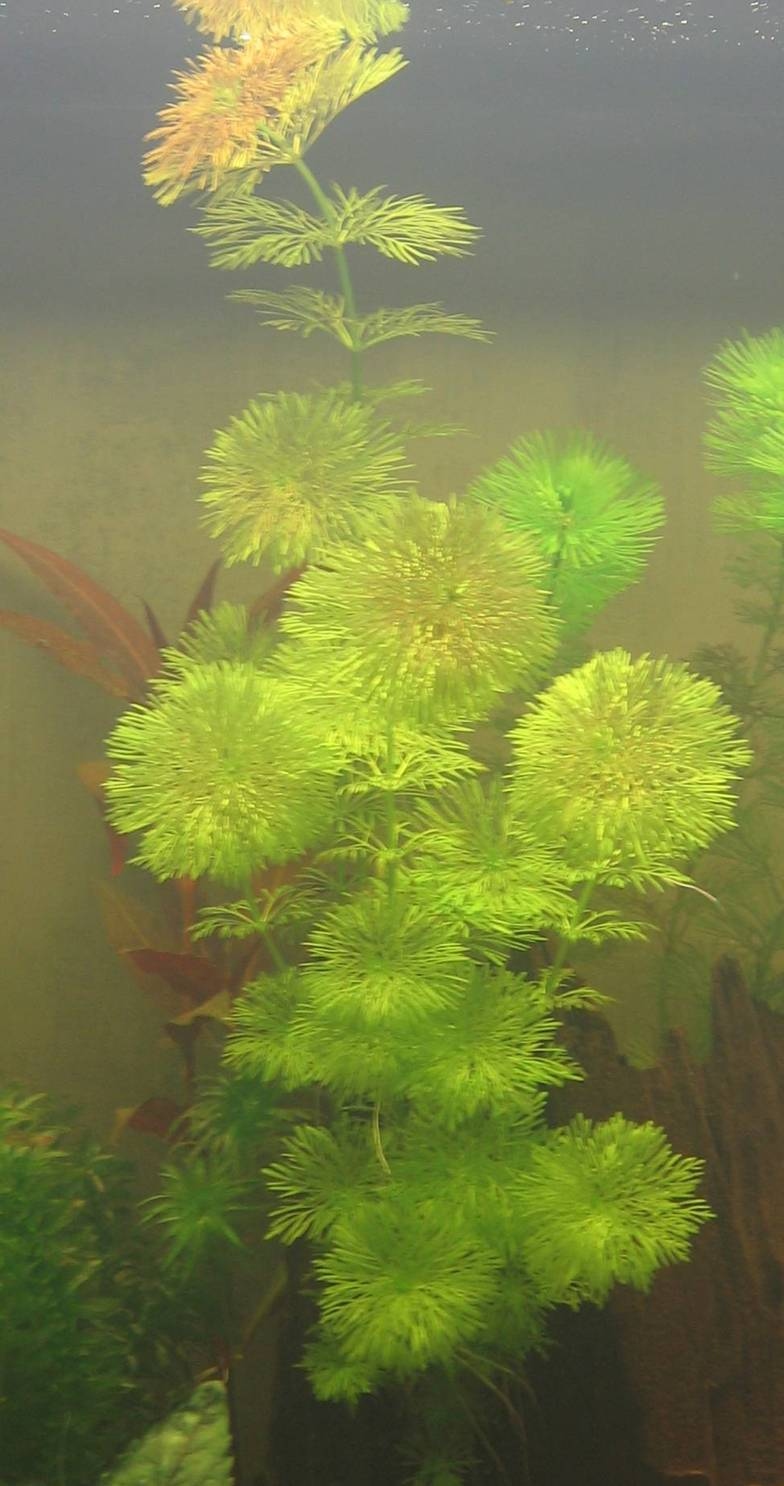

Conservation status
- Least Concern (IUCN 3.1)

Scientific classification
- Kingdom: Plantae
- Clade: Tracheophytes
- Clade: Angiosperms
- Clade: Eudicots
- Clade: Asterids
- Order: Lamiales
- Family: Plantaginaceae
- Genus: Limnophila
- Species: L. sessiliflora

Binomial name
- Limnophila sessiliflora (Vahl) Blume

Synonyms
- Hottonia sessiliflora Vahl; Benjaminia glabra Benj.; Stemodia sessiliflora (Vahl) F.Muell.; Limnophila griffithii Hook.f.; Ambulia sessiliflora (Vahl) Baill. ex Wettst.; Terebinthina sessiliflora (Vahl) Kuntze; Stemodiacra sessiliflora (Vahl) Hiern; Limnophila taoyuanensis Y.P.Yang & S.H.Yen

= Limnophila sessiliflora =

Species of flowering plant

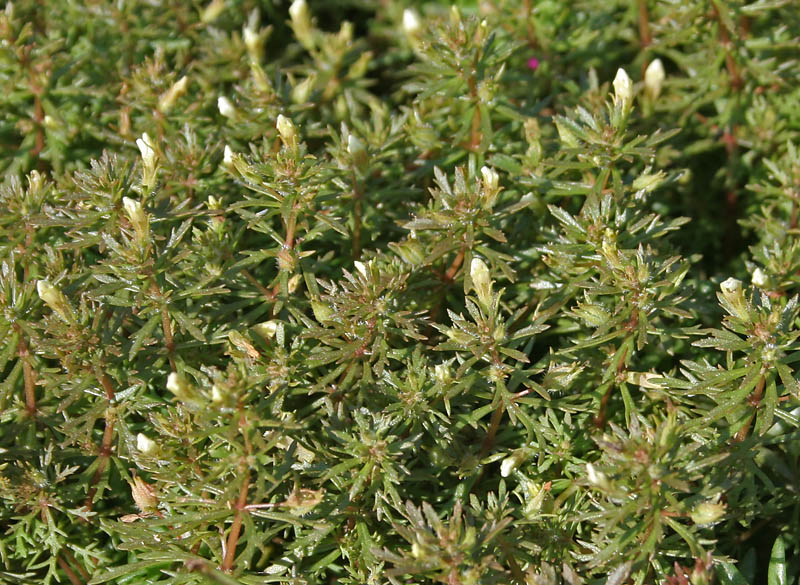
in Hyderabad, India.

Limnophila sessiliflora, known as dwarf ambulia, ambulis, and Asian marshweed is a flowering plant in the family Plantaginaceae, mostly found in southeast Asia.

== Distribution and habitat ==
L. sessiliflora is native to Bangladesh, Bhutan, China (Anhui, Fujian, Guangdong, Guangxi, Guizhou, Hainan, Henan, Inner Mongolia, Jiangsu, Jiangxi, Liaoning, Sichuan, Yunnan, Zhejiang), Hong Kong, India (Assam, Sikkim), Indonesia (Java), Japan (Ryukyu Islands), North Korea, Malaysia, Myanmar, Nepal, the Northern Mariana Islands, the Philippines, Singapore, South Korea, Sri Lanka, Taiwan, Thailand, and Vietnam. It inhabits a wide range of natural and man-made freshwater wetland habitats including ponds, rice fields, and swamps. It occurs in both permanent and seasonal waters at altitudes up to 1,900 m (6,200 ft).

This species has become invasive in the United States, occurring in the states of Florida, Georgia, and Texas. It likely became established in the U.S. after escaping cultivation in Florida, where it was first recorded growing in Hillsborough County in 1961.

== Description ==
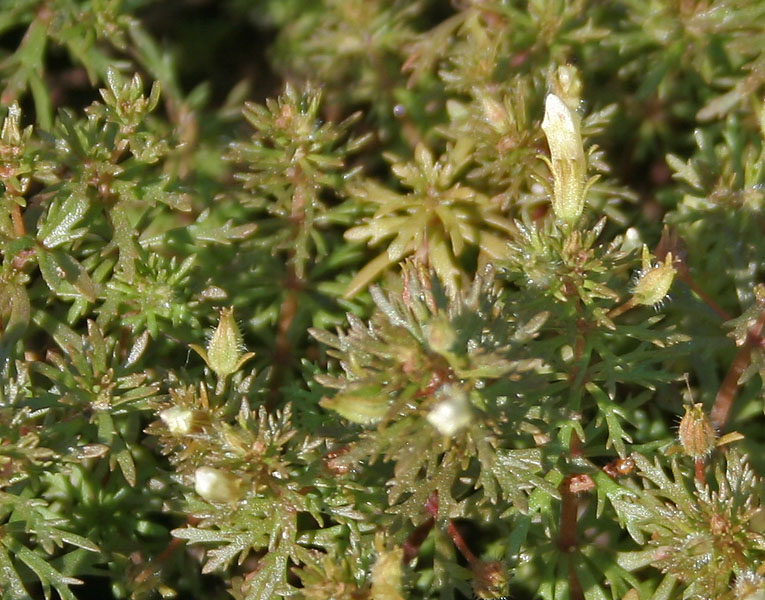
in Hyderabad, India.

This species appears superficially similar to Cabomba caroliniana, yet it has leaves formed in whorls, about 1.2 inches (3 cm) in diameter. Any confusion is likely due to the leaves being pinnate and bright green in colour. Under strong artificial light or sunlight, the leaves take on a reddish, 'stresses' hue, as do many plant species. When the plant has received enough light for the day, the whorls of leaves will often close, and the entire plant will "sleep". This plant can, eventually, reach over 16 inches (40 cm) in height, often growing emergent (out of the water's surface), where sunlight and carbon dioxide are more available. Leaves that emerge above the water appear quite different, being often a darker green, and more or less 'Lance'-shaped.

The fruit are elliptical capsules, 3.5–5.5 mm long, green-brown when submersed, dark brown when emersed.

== Ecology ==
L. sessiliflora is an aquatic perennial herb. It is capable of growing fully submerged or emergent, with the leaves taking on distinct submerged and emerged forms. It is a fast growing species that may reproduce by seed or by stem fragmentation.
