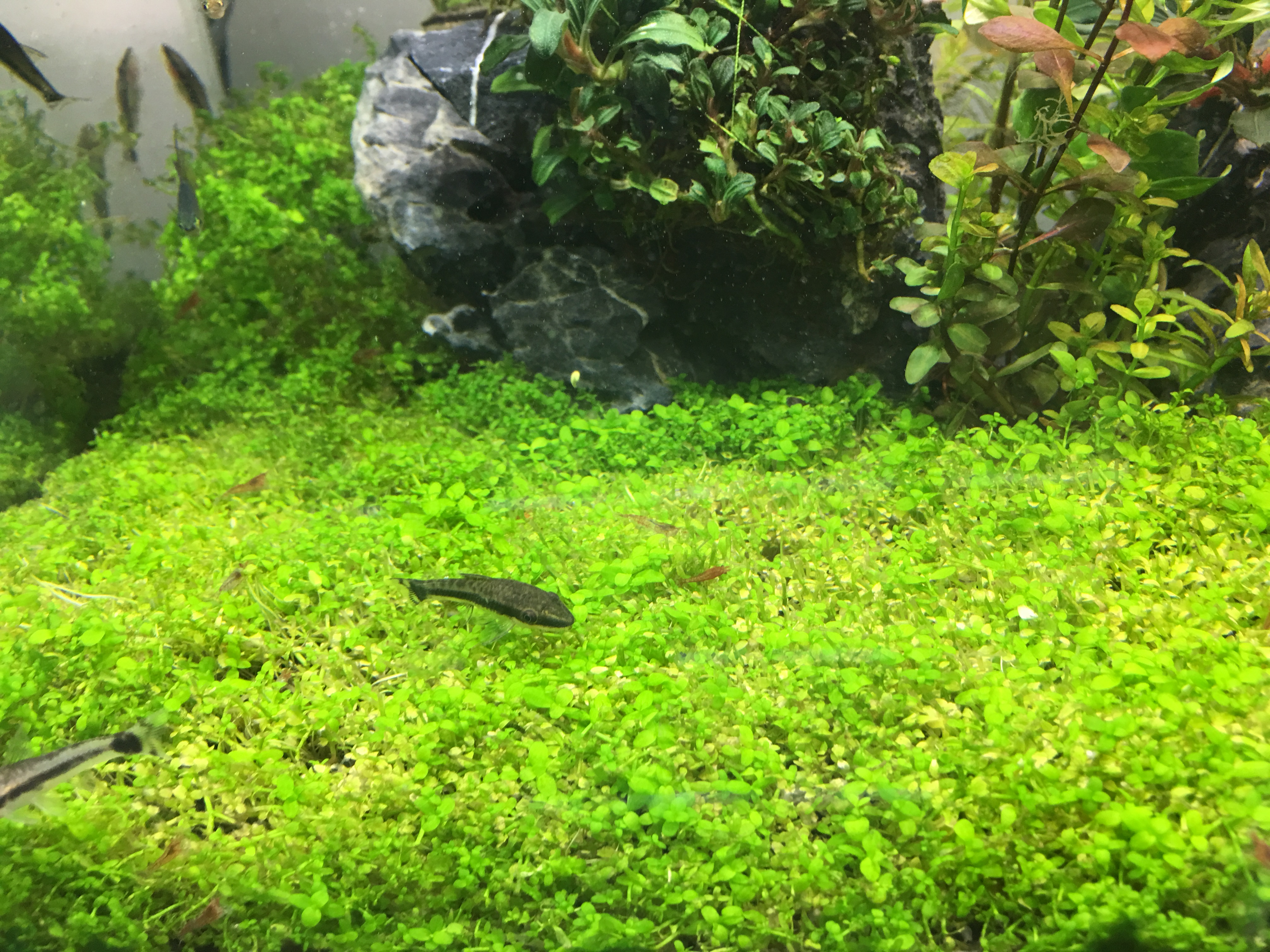

Scientific classification
- Kingdom: Plantae
- Clade: Tracheophytes
- Clade: Angiosperms
- Clade: Eudicots
- Clade: Asterids
- Order: Lamiales
- Family: Scrophulariaceae
- Genus: Hemianthus
- Species: H. callitrichoides

Binomial name
- Hemianthus callitrichoides Griseb.

= Hemianthus callitrichoides =

Species of aquatic plant

Hemianthus callitrichoides (called dwarf baby tears, cuba or simply by the initials HC) is a semi-aquatic plant in the family Linderniaceae. The plant is endemic to West Indies, where it is native to the islands of The Bahamas, Cuba, Hispaniola, Jamaica, and Puerto Rico. In The Bahamas, this species known as water-starwort.

This species is commonly used as a foreground or carpeting plant in planted aquariums. When used in aquascaping, this species is known to have relatively high light and carbon dioxide requirements. Once planted, each portion will produce runners which basically are individual stems that branch off and grow along the substrate.

Hemianthus callitrichoides was first collected by Holger Windeløv and Eusebio Canicio Delgado Pérez in 2003 in Las Pozas, Cuba, about 90 kilometres (56 mi) east of Havana.
