= Limnophila limnophiloides =

Conservation status
- Extinct (IUCN 3.1)

Scientific classification
- Kingdom: Plantae
- Clade: Tracheophytes
- Clade: Angiosperms
- Clade: Eudicots
- Clade: Asterids
- Order: Lamiales
- Family: Plantaginaceae
- Genus: Limnophila
- Species: †L. limnophiloides

Binomial name
- †Limnophila limnophiloides (Blatt. & Hallb.) Karthik. & V.S.Kumar

Synonyms
- Bonnayodes limnophiloides Blatt. & Hallb., 1921

Species of flowering plant

Limnophila limnophiloides is an aquatic plant belonging to the family Plantaginaceae which was endemic to the Bhushi lake in India. It was last recorded from a single specimen collected in 1918 and has been listed as extinct by the International Union for Conservation of Nature in June 2024.
