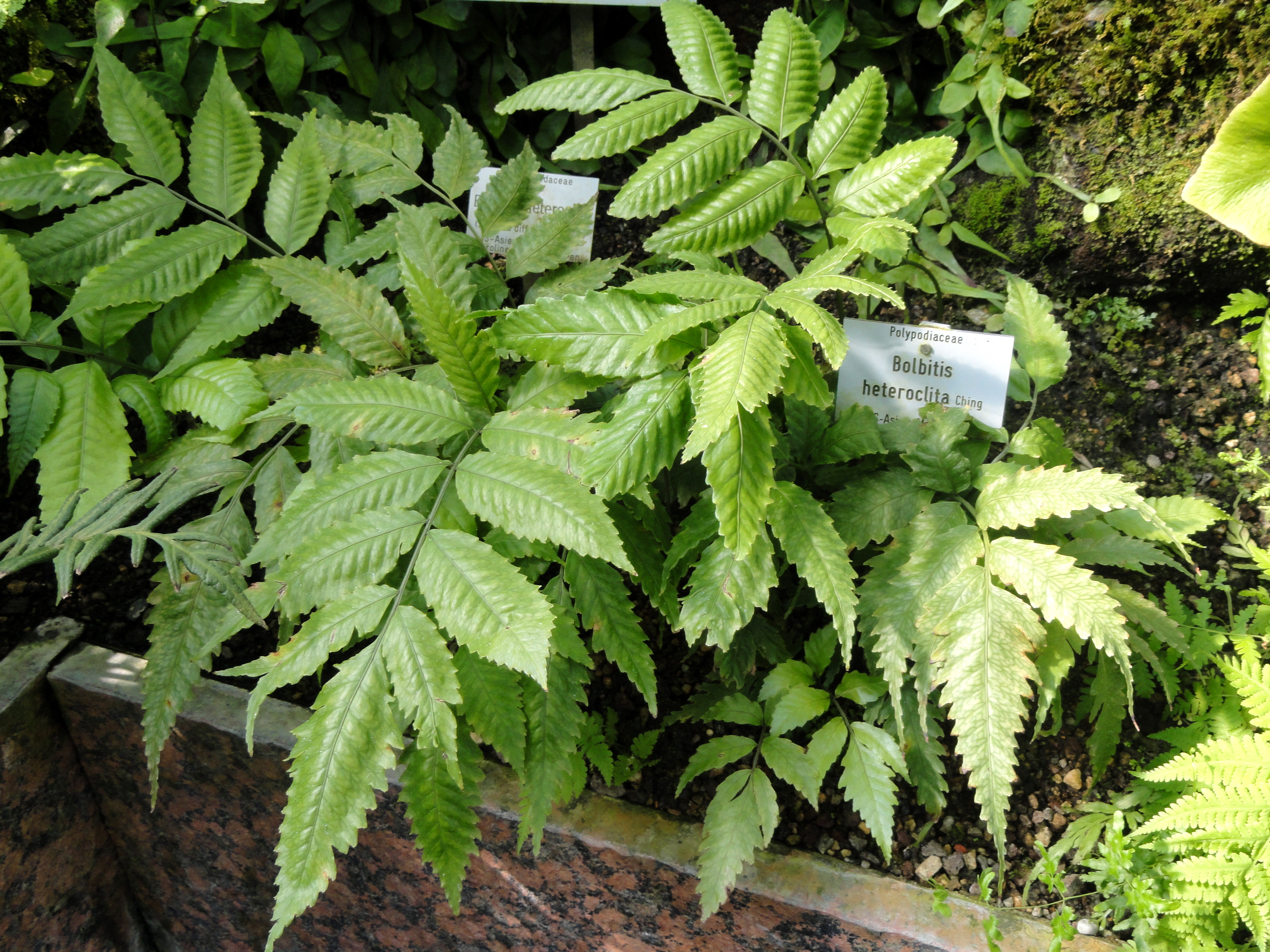
- Bolbitis heteroclita

Scientific classification
- Kingdom: Plantae
- Clade: Tracheophytes
- Division: Polypodiophyta
- Class: Polypodiopsida
- Order: Polypodiales
- Suborder: Polypodiineae
- Family: Dryopteridaceae
- Subfamily: Elaphoglossoideae
- Genus: Bolbitis; Schott

Species
- See text.

= Bolbitis =

Genus of ferns

Bolbitis is a genus of ferns in the family Dryopteridaceae, subfamily Elaphoglossoideae, in the Pteridophyte Phylogeny Group classification of 2016 (PPG I).

Two particular members of the genus are often grown as immersed water plants in aquaria, B. heudelotii, and B. heteroclita. B. heudelotii, the African water fern, normally grows submerged in its native habitat, while B. heteroclita normally grows on the margin of water bodies, but will also grow submerged.

== Species ==
As of November 2026, the Checklist of Ferns and Lycophytes of the World accepted 67 species and 8 hybrids in Bolbitis. World Flora Online accepted 65 species and 8 hybrids, while Plants of the World Online accepted 67 species and 7 hybrids.

- Bolbitis acrostichoides (Afzel. ex Sw.) Ching
- Bolbitis aliena (Sw.) Alston
- Bolbitis andreisii Fraser-Jenk. & Kandel
- Bolbitis angustipinna (Hayata) Itô
- Bolbitis appendiculata (Willd.) K.Iwats.
- Bolbitis aspleniifolia (Bory) K.Iwats.
- Bolbitis auriculata (Lam.) Alston
- Bolbitis beddomei Fraser-Jenk. & Gandhi
- Bolbitis bipinnatifida (Mett. ex Kuhn) Ching
- Bolbitis cadieri (Christ) Ching
- Bolbitis changjiangensis F.G.Wang & F.W.Xing
- Bolbitis christensenii (Ching) Ching
- Bolbitis confertifolia Ching (synonymized with B. heteroclita by World Flora Online)
- Bolbitis costata (Wall. ex Hook.) Ching
- Bolbitis crispatula (Wall. ex Hook.) Ching
- Bolbitis cuneata (Bonap.) Fraser-Jenk. (synonymized with Lomagramma sinuata by World Flora Online and Microsorum commutatum by Plants of the World Online)
- Bolbitis deltigera ([Wall. ex] Hook.) C.Chr.
- Bolbitis difformis (Copel.) Knouse
- Bolbitis feeiana (Copel.) Fraser-Jenk. & Gandhi
- Bolbitis fengiana (Ching) S.Y.Dong
- Bolbitis fluviatilis (Hook.) Ching
- Bolbitis gaboonensis (Hook.) Alston
- Bolbitis gemmifera (Hieron.) C.Chr.
- Bolbitis hainanensis Ching & C.H.Wang
- Bolbitis hastata (Liebm. ex E.Fourn.) Hennipman
- Bolbitis hekouensis Ching
- Bolbitis helferiana (Kunze) K.Iwats. (treated as a hybrid by World Ferns Online and Plants of the World Online)
- Bolbitis heteroclita (C.Presl) Ching
- Bolbitis heudelotii (Bory ex Fée) Alston
- Bolbitis humblotii (Baker) Ching
- Bolbitis inconstans (Copel.) Ching
- Bolbitis interlineata (Copel.) Ching
- Bolbitis lanceolata S.K.Wu & J.Y.Xiang
- Bolbitis lianhuachihensis Y.S.Chao, Y.F.Huang & H.Y.Liu
- Bolbitis lonchophora (Kunze) C.Chr.
- Bolbitis longiflagellata (Bonap.) Ching
- Bolbitis major (Bedd.) Hennipman
- Bolbitis medogensis (Ching & S.K.Wu) S.Y.Dong
- Bolbitis moranii J.B.Jiménez
- Bolbitis nodiflora (Bory) Fraser-Jenk.
- Bolbitis novoguineensis Hennipman
- Bolbitis occidentalis R.C.Moran
- Bolbitis pandurifolia (Hook.) Ching
- Bolbitis portoricensis (Spreng.) Hennipman
- Bolbitis quoyana (Gaudich.) Ching
- Bolbitis rawsonii (Baker) Ching
- Bolbitis repanda (Blume) Schott
- Bolbitis rhizophylla (Kaulf.) Hennipman
- Bolbitis rivularis (Brack.) Ching
- Bolbitis salicina (Hook.) Ching
- Bolbitis scalpturata (Fée) Ching
- Bolbitis semicordata (Baker) Ching
- Bolbitis semipinnatifida (Fée) Alston
- Bolbitis serrata (Kuhn) Ching
- Bolbitis serratifolia (Mert. ex Kaulf.) Schott
- Bolbitis simplex R.C.Moran
- Bolbitis sinensis (Baker) K.Iwats.
- Bolbitis singaporensis Holttum
- Bolbitis sinuata (C.Presl) Hennipman
- Bolbitis subcordata (Copel.) Ching
- Bolbitis subcrenata (Hook. & Grev.) Ching
- Bolbitis taylorii (Bailey) Ching
- Bolbitis tibetica Ching & S.K.Wu
- Bolbitis tonkinensis (C.Chr. ex Ching) K.Iwats.
- Bolbitis umbrosa (Liebm.) Ching
- Bolbitis vanuaensis Brownlie
- Bolbitis virens (Wall. ex Hook. & Grev.) Schott
- Bolbitis × arguta (Fée) Ching (considered a species by Plants of the World Online)
- Bolbitis × boivinii (Mett.) Ching (considered a species by Plants of the World Online)
- Bolbitis × lancea (Copel.) Ching
- Bolbitis × laxireticulata K.Iwats.
- Bolbitis × multipinna F.G.Wang, K.Iwats. & F.W.Xing
- Bolbitis × nanjenensis C.M.Kuo
- Bolbitis × sinuosa (Fée) Copel.
- Bolbitis × terminans (Wall.) Gandhi & Fraser-Jenk.
