= Aquarium lighting =

Artificial lighting to illuminate an aquarium

Aquarium lighting describes any type of artificial lighting that is used to illuminate an aquarium. Some types of aquaria such as reef aquariums and planted aquariums require specialized high intensity lighting to support photosynthetic life within the tank.

== Freshwater ==
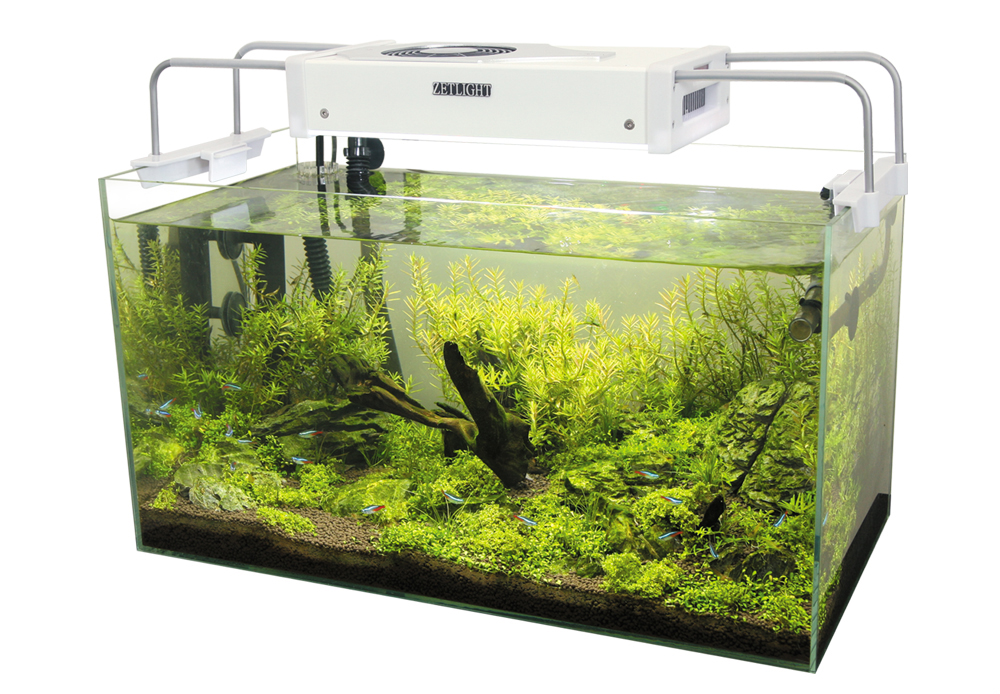
Aquarium with LED lighting

Freshwater aquarium lighting is commonly provided by screw-in incandescent bulbs, fluorescent tubes and LED lamps. Incandescent lighting is becoming less popular because it uses much more energy and produces more heat than the other lighting types. Compact fluorescent lighting with a compatible screw-in base is frequently used as a direct replacement for incandescent bulbs.

Freshwater planted aquariums require more specialized light sources. High-intensity compact fluorescent bulbs, high output fluorescent bulbs or metal halide lamps are often used over such aquariums to encourage plant growth. In addition to providing a much stronger light source, these light sources also offer a better spectrum for plant and algae growth than standard lighting. However, this metal halide lighting often uses more electricity and can produce excessive heat.

Other newer sources for planted aquariums that use less electricity and produce less heat include the T2, T5, SHO, and LED. The LED aquarium light fixtures generally are the most efficient, although the T2, T5, and in particular the SHO, have their positive planted aquarium applications as well.

== Brackish ==
Brackish aquarium lighting is similar to freshwater and planted tank lighting, depending on the species included. Brackish aquariums may also include infrared or UVB bulbs (or both types) for basking animals such as turtles.

== Marine ==
=== Fish only ===
In fish-only marine aquariums, lighting is intended only for illumination. Lighting is chosen primarily with aesthetic considerations for optimal viewing of the fish. The lighting is generally of much lower intensity than is used in reef aquariums to limit algae growth.

=== Reef ===
The lighting used for reef aquariums is the highest intensity of all aquarium types. Typical light sources types include LED, fluorescent, metal halide, and sometimes plasma lamps. Simple lighting setups use a single lamp or multiple lamps of a single type. More advanced setups can include several lamp types and can also include lamps of different colours. Lamp colour plays an important role in reef aquarium lighting for both aesthetic preference and to optimally sustain the photosynthetic life within the aquarium. Many corals require a deep blue or actinic spectrum of light to thrive.

T5 High Output fluorescent bulbs which are thinner than traditional T8 bulbs and provide a much brighter, more powerful light are commonly used as are the older VHO (Very High Output) fluorescent tubes and compact fluorescent lighting.

Another light source in reef aquariums is metal halide lighting. Metal halide bulbs can exhibit color temperatures ranging from 5000k to 20,000k and so allow the zooxanthellae algae, that inhabit coral tissues, to photosynthesize. Many aquarists will use metal halide bulbs in conjunction with either power compact fluorescents or T5 fluorescents since halide lighting does not have the overall balanced effect of other light types. While very useful to reef aquarium keepers, halide lighting also uses a lot of electricity (150-400 watts being common) and produces copious amounts of heat. Most reef keepers mount halide bulbs at least one foot above their tank and some, due to the lights' heat output have had to add chillers to keep aquarium water cool.

Many light fixtures come as all-in-one units with light for both daylight hours and nighttime viewing. LED lamps of 3/4 to 2 watts can be implemented to come on at night, simulating the glow of the moon over the tank. All in one fixtures may require large fans to cool the bulbs and achieve maximum efficiency. LED lighting is also becoming more common for not only lunar lighting but also to simulate daylight conditions. LEDs have a higher initial cost than other lighting sources but utilize much less energy. LED lighting also provides other benefits such as being dimmable. LEDs produce a very narrow color spectrum that is limited to a narrow band of wavelengths. For this reason an array of different colored LEDs is required to be used in combination to simulate spectral coverage that is suitable for coral growth. Early adopters of pure LED based systems have reported that the limited color spectrum provided by LEDs may not produce optimal coral growth.
