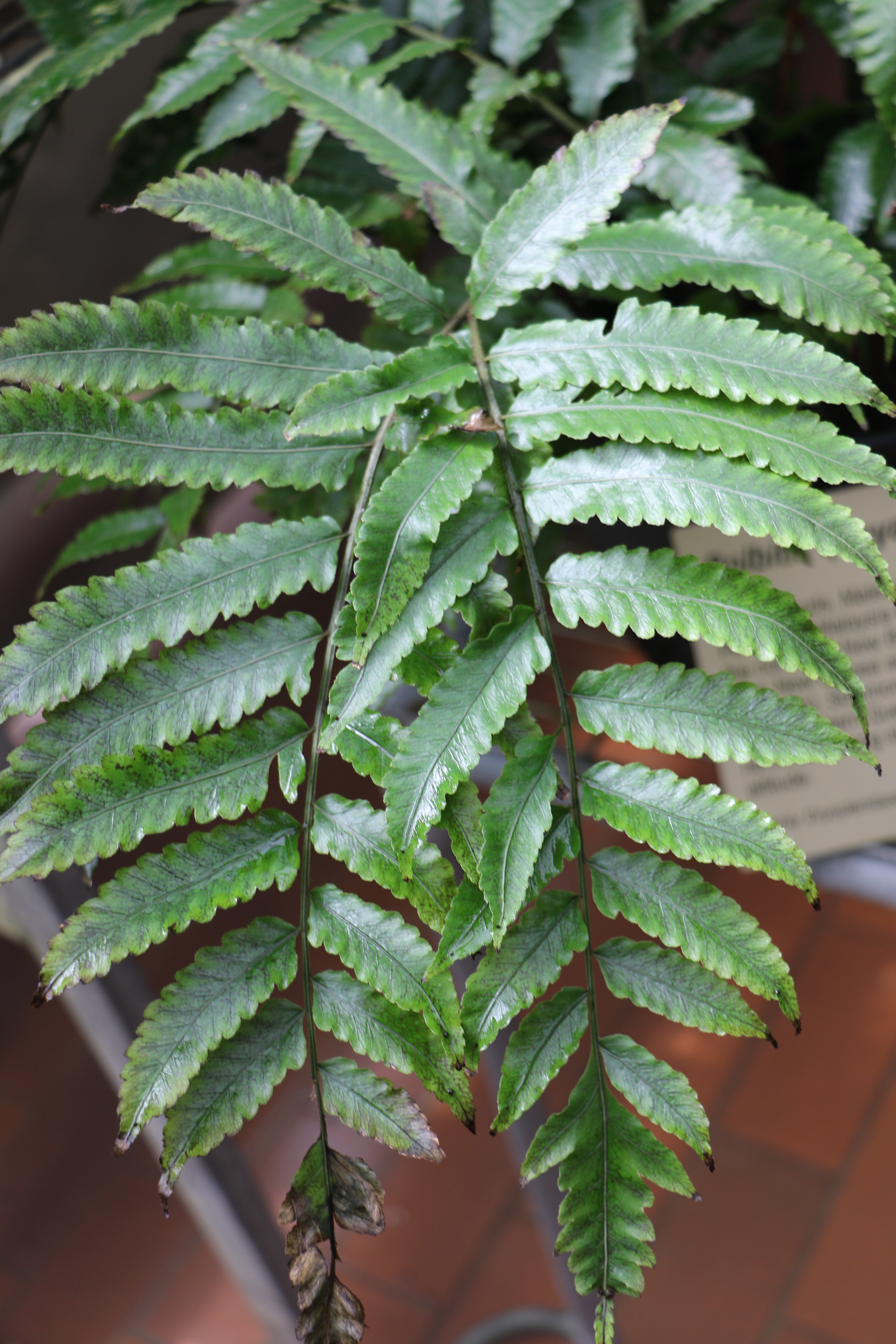

Scientific classification
- Kingdom: Plantae
- Clade: Tracheophytes
- Division: Polypodiophyta
- Class: Polypodiopsida
- Order: Polypodiales
- Suborder: Polypodiineae
- Family: Dryopteridaceae
- Genus: Bolbitis
- Species: B. quoyana

Binomial name
- Bolbitis quoyana (Gaudich.) Ching

= Bolbitis quoyana =

Species of plant

Bolbitis quoyana is a species of fern. Indigenous to Australia, Malesia, and some Pacific islands such as Samoa and Fiji. Found in tropical rainforests, often beside streams, up to 500 metres above sea level.
