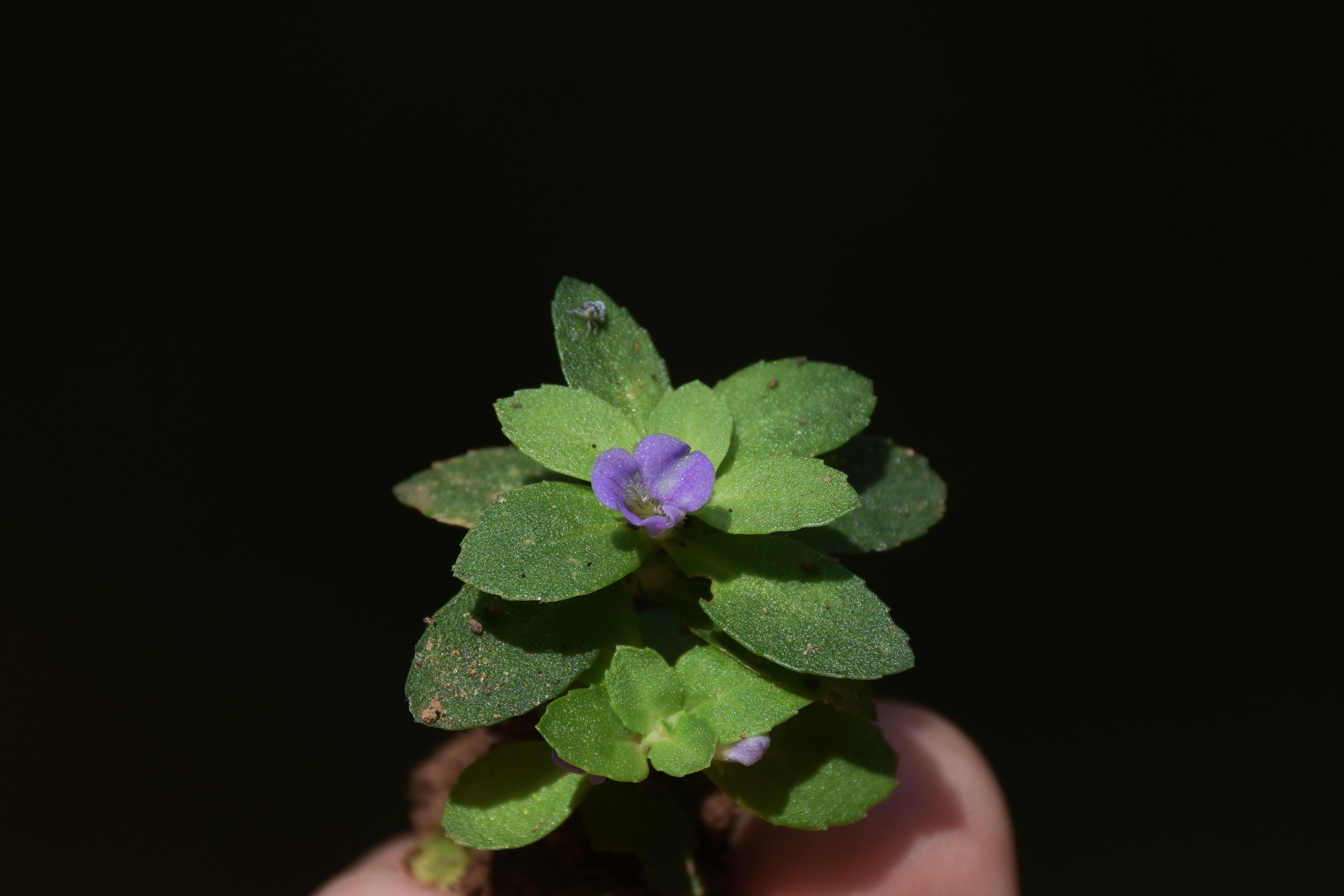

Scientific classification
- Kingdom: Plantae
- Clade: Tracheophytes
- Clade: Angiosperms
- Clade: Eudicots
- Clade: Asterids
- Order: Lamiales
- Family: Plantaginaceae
- Genus: Limnophila
- Species: L. repens

Binomial name
- Limnophila repens Benth.

= Limnophila repens =

Species of flowering plant

Limnophila repens, the creeping marshweed, is a herbaceous plant belonging to the family Plantaginaceae. It grows up to 45 cm tall both in terrestrial and fresh water habitats. The plant has a strong aromatic smell. Stems are covered with fine hair. Leaves are subsessile opposite and oblong. Violet-pink(rarely yellow) flowers are axilary and solitary or in short racemes. Seeds are angular and brown. Flowering season: November to May.
