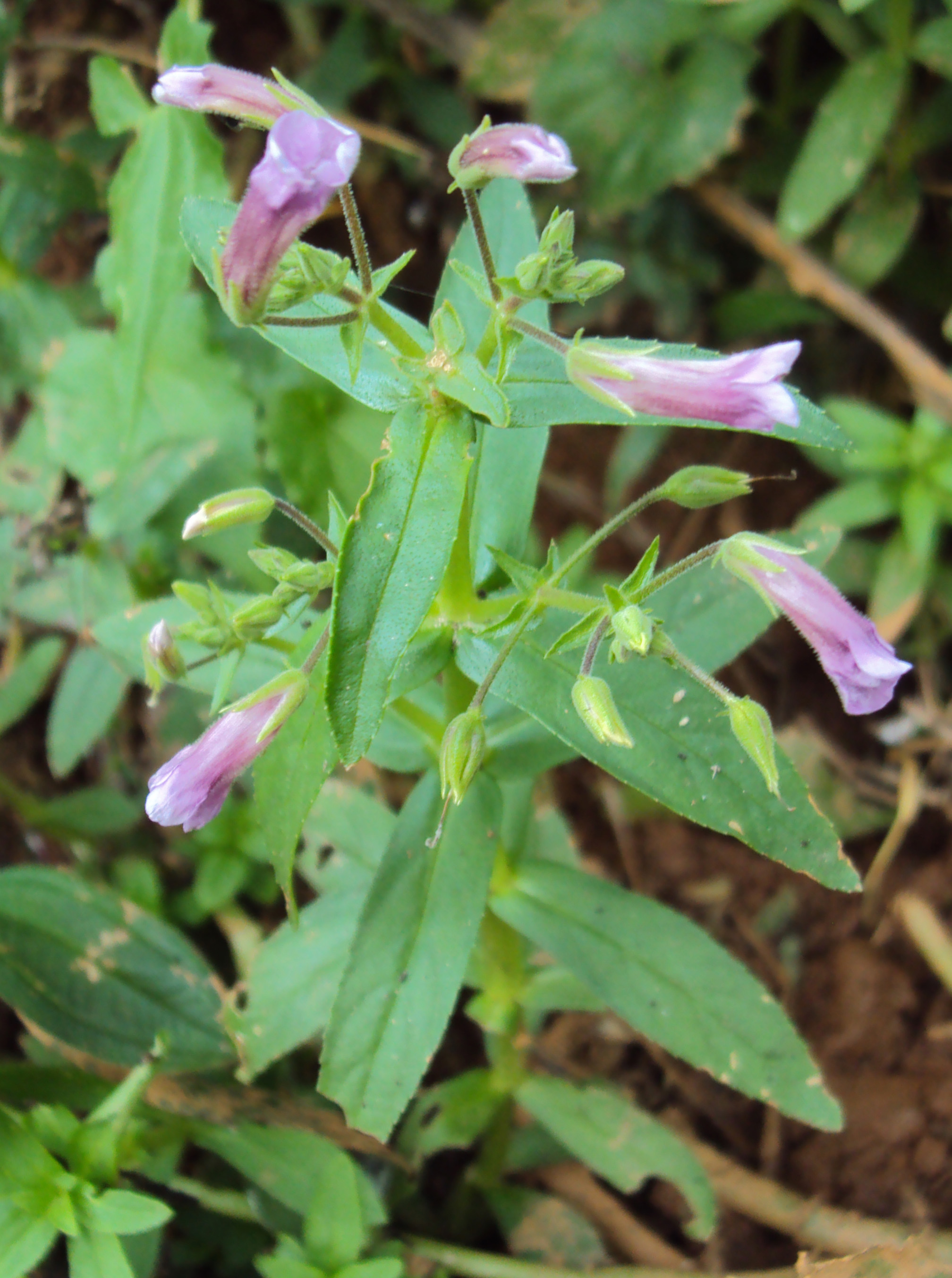
- flowering plant

Scientific classification
- Kingdom: Plantae
- Clade: Tracheophytes
- Clade: Angiosperms
- Clade: Eudicots
- Clade: Asterids
- Order: Lamiales
- Family: Plantaginaceae
- Genus: Limnophila
- Species: L. aromatica

Binomial name
- Limnophila aromatica (Lam.) Merr.

Synonyms
- Limnophila aromaticoides Yang & Yen; Limnophila chinensis subsp. aromatica (Lam.) T. Yamaz.

= Limnophila aromatica =

Species of flowering plant

Limnophila aromatica, the rice paddy herb, is a tropical flowering plant in the family Plantaginaceae. It is native to Southeast Asia, where it flourishes in hot temperatures and grows most often in watery environments, particularly in flooded rice fields. It is called ngò ôm, ngò om, or ngổ in Vietnam and used as an herb and also cultivated for use as an aquarium plant. The plant was introduced to North America in the 1970s due to Vietnamese immigration following the Vietnam War. It is called "ma om" (ម្អម) in Khmer. It is used in traditional Cambodian soup dishes and Southern Vietnamese cuisine. It can grow in flooded rice paddies during wet season but it grows best on drained but still wet sandy soil of harvested rice paddies for a few months after the rainy season ends. It dies out soon after it flowers. Rural Cambodians often harvest them and put them on the roof of their houses to dry for later use.

== Taxonomy ==
Limnophila aromatica was formerly classified as a member of the figwort family, Scrophulariaceae, but is now classified in the plantain family, Plantaginaceae.

== Culinary use ==
Limnophila aromatica has a flavor and aroma reminiscent of both lemon and cumin. It is used most often in Vietnamese cuisine, where it is called ngò ôm or ngò om. It is an ingredient in canh chua, a sweet and sour seafood soup which also includes tamarind, not to be confused with ngò gai which is also added as an accompaniment to the noodle soup called phở. In Thai cuisine it is known as phak khaeyng (ผักแขยง) and is also used to make om.

== Ornamental use ==
Limnophila aromatica is able to live completely submerged, and as such it is a popular aquarium plant. The submerged leaf form is less rigid and bigger than the emergent leaf form, it is green with a purple underside, turning completely red under high light conditions.

== See also ==
- Cuisine of Vietnam
- Cuisine of Cambodia
- List of Thai ingredients
