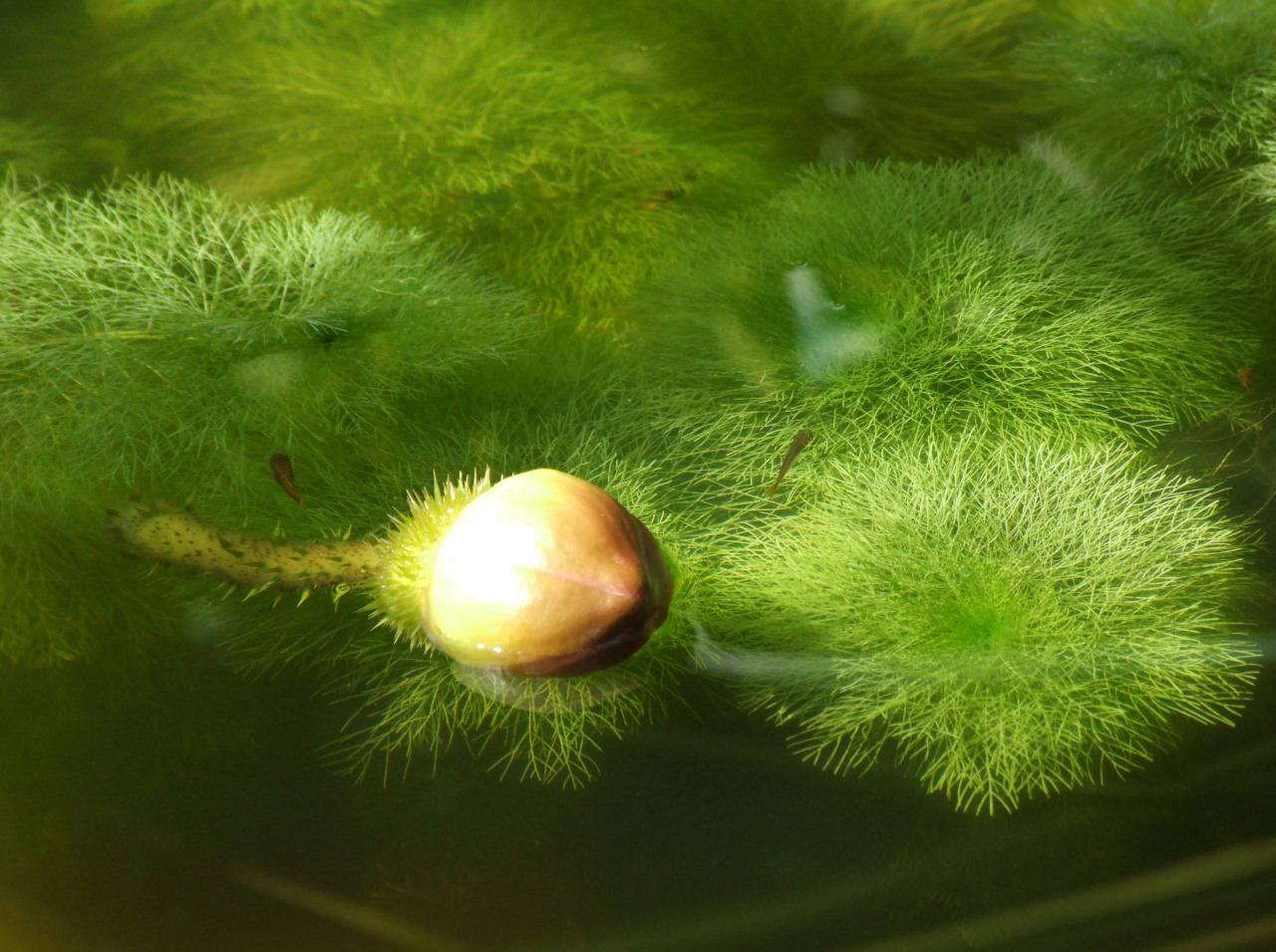

Scientific classification
- Kingdom: Plantae
- Clade: Tracheophytes
- Clade: Angiosperms
- Clade: Eudicots
- Clade: Asterids
- Order: Lamiales
- Family: Plantaginaceae
- Genus: Limnophila
- Species: L. aquatica

Binomial name
- Limnophila aquatica (Roxb.) Alston

= Limnophila aquatica =

Species of flowering plant

Limnophila aquatica, known commonly as the giant ambulia, is a plant belonging to the family Plantaginaceae. Limnophila aquatica grows naturally in Asia, Sri Lanka and India and is characterised by its fine leaves and bushy, pine-like appearance. In the aquarium it grows best in medium or very high lighting, preferably in acidic conditions. It can grow to a height of 9-20 inches, and its width can vary from 3-6 inches.
