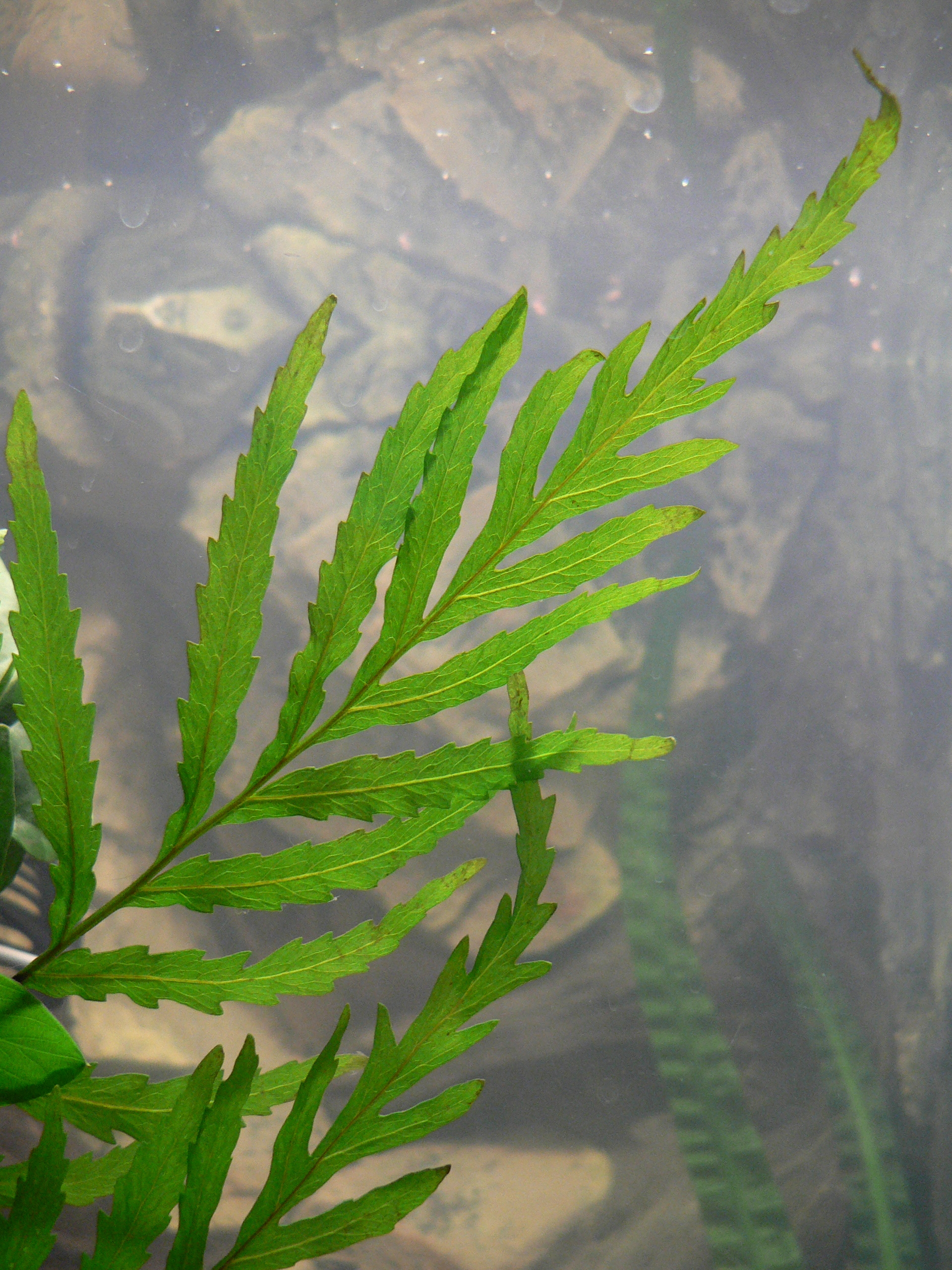

Conservation status
- Least Concern (IUCN 3.1)

Scientific classification
- Kingdom: Plantae
- Clade: Tracheophytes
- Division: Polypodiophyta
- Class: Polypodiopsida
- Order: Polypodiales
- Suborder: Polypodiineae
- Family: Dryopteridaceae
- Genus: Bolbitis
- Species: B. heudelotii

Binomial name
- Bolbitis heudelotii (Bory ex Fée) Alston

Synonyms
- Gymnopteris heudelotii Bory ex Fée; Anapausia heudelotii (Bory ex Fée) C.Presl; Acrostichum heudelotti (Bory ex Fée) Hook.; Chrysodium heudelotii (Bory ex Fée) Kuhn; Leptochilus heudelotii (Bory ex Fée) C.Chr.; Campium angustifolium Copel.; Campium heudelotti (Bory ex Fée) Copel.; Bolbitis felixii Tardieu

= Bolbitis heudelotii =

Species of aquatic plant

Bolbitis heudelotii, also known as the African water fern, creeping fern, and Congo fern, is native to subtropical and tropical Africa, from Ethiopia west to Senegal; and down to northern South Africa.

== Description ==
Bolbitis heudelotii, named for the botanical explorer of West Africa Jean-Pierre Heudelot (1802–1837), is an aquatic polypody fern growing submerged in rivers and streams, attached to rocks or wood by the threadlike rootlets extending from its rhizomes. It has dark green, pinnate leaves 15–40 cm long and 15–25 cm broad. It grows submerged. The water in its native habitat is fast-moving over sandy or rocky bottoms, very clean, not very hard and slightly acidic. The roots cling to rocks and the sandy beds.

== Cultivation ==
In the aquarium, B. heudelotii requires water temperatures of 20–28 °C and moderately acidic ('soft') to neutral water with a pH range of 5.0–7.0, but tolerates a wide range of light levels. It does best in flowing water.

This species is often used as a midground specimen plant in tropical freshwater aquaria. Propagation is from divisions and cuttings from the rhizome.

It seems to be intolerant to being crowded and to fish excreta. It is best grown secured to a piece of wood rather than planted direct in the substrate. Additional CO_{2} seems to boost growth and it grows best in a rather shady position.

Propagation is by division of the rhizome. It is a slow-growing plant.
