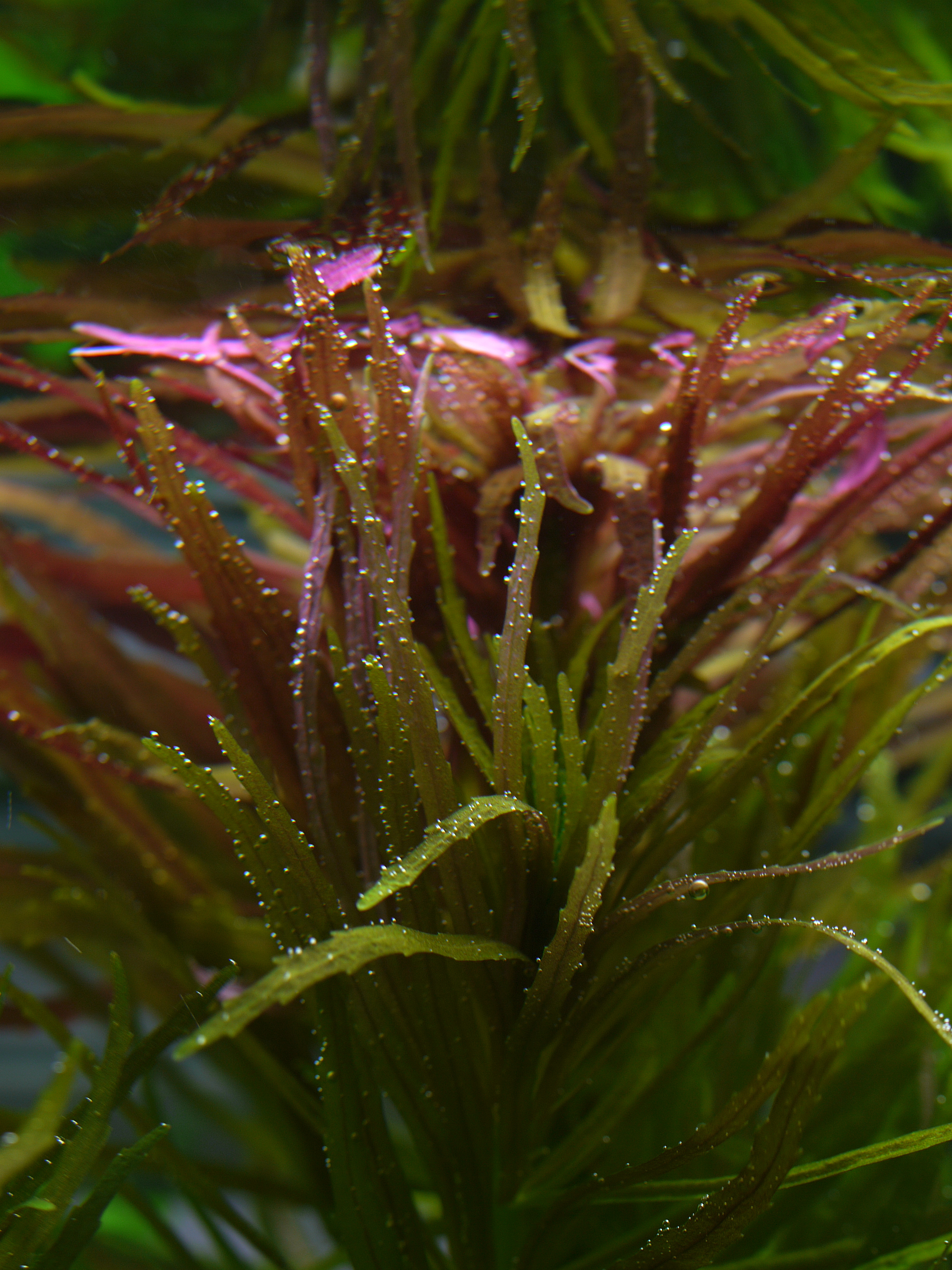
- Limnophila aromatica

Scientific classification
- Kingdom: Plantae
- Clade: Tracheophytes
- Clade: Angiosperms
- Clade: Eudicots
- Clade: Asterids
- Order: Lamiales
- Family: Plantaginaceae
- Tribe: Gratioleae
- Genus: Limnophila; R.Br.

Type species
- Limnophila gratioloides R.Br.

Species
- About 40 – see text

Synonyms
- Diceros Lour.; Bonnayodes Blatt. & Hallb.; Cybbanthera Buch.-Ham. ex D.Don; Honottia Rchb.; Hydropityon C.F.Gaertn.; Tala Blanco; Terebinthina Rumph. ex Kuntze; Ambulia Lam.

= Limnophila (plant) =

Genus of flowering plants in the plantain family

Limnophila is a genus of flowering plants in the family Plantaginaceae. It is distributed in tropical and subtropical regions of Africa, Asia, Australia, and the Pacific Islands. Species are known commonly as marshweeds.

== Description ==
These are annual or perennial herbs. They grow in wet habitat, such as marshes, and some are aquatic. Some species are glandular and aromatic. Plants of the genus vary in form, from erect to prostrate, and with branching or unbranched stems. Submerged leaves are whorled; aerial leaves are whorled or oppositely arranged. The leaves are lance-shaped or pinnate, and the blades have smooth or serrated edges. Some species have flowers solitary in the leaf axils, and others have flowers in inflorescences. The sepals are arranged in a tubular calyx, and the corolla is tubular or funnel-shaped. The corolla has a lower lip with three lobes and an upper lip that is unlobed or double-lobed.

== Species ==
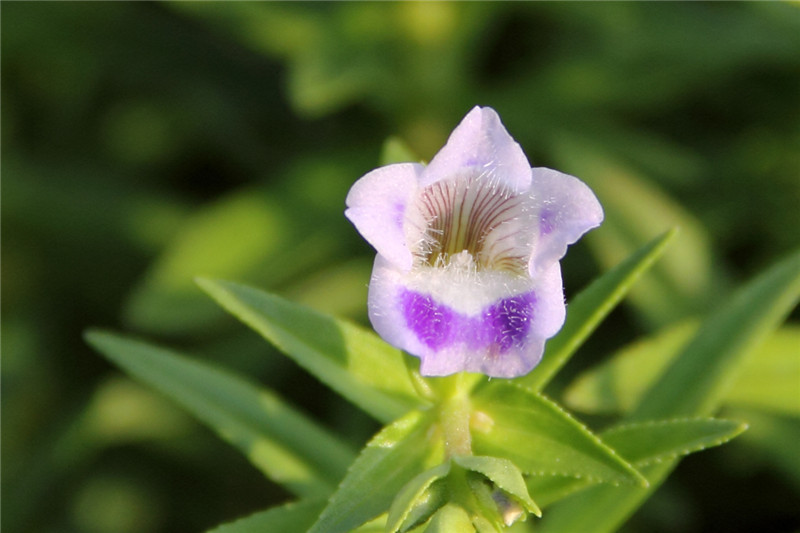
Limnophila heterophylla in China

As of May 2025, Plants of the World Online accepts the following 46 species:

- Limnophila aquatica (Roxb.) Alston
- Limnophila aromatica (Lam.) Merr.
- Limnophila australis Wannan & J.T.Waterh.
- Limnophila balsamea (Benth.) Benth.
- Limnophila bangweolensis (R.E.Fr.) Verdc.
- Limnophila barteri Skan
- Limnophila borealis Y.Z.Zhao & Ma f.
- Limnophila brownii Wannan
- Limnophila cambodiana T.Yamaz.
- Limnophila cana Griff.
- Limnophila ceratophylloides (Hiern) Skan
- Limnophila chinensis (Osbeck) Merr.
- Limnophila connata (Buch.-Ham. ex D.Don) Hand.-Mazz.
- Limnophila crassifolia Philcox
- Limnophila dasyantha (Engl. & Gilg) Skan
- Limnophila erecta Benth.
- Limnophila fluviatilis A.Chev.
- Limnophila fragrans (G.Forst.) Seem.
- Limnophila geoffrayi Bonati
- Limnophila glabra (Benj.) Kerr
- Limnophila glandulifera Philcox
- Limnophila hayatae T.Yamaz.
- Limnophila helferi Hook.f.
- Limnophila heterophylla (Roxb.) Benth.
- Limnophila hippuridoides Philcox
- Limnophila indica (L.) Druce
- Limnophila laotica Bonati
- Limnophila laxa Benth.
- Limnophila limnophiloides (Blatt. & Hallb.) Karthik. & V.S.Kumar
- Limnophila × ludoviciana Thieret
- Limnophila micrantha (Benth.) Benth.
- Limnophila palauensis T.Yamaz.
- Limnophila parviflora T.Yamaz.
- Limnophila poilanei T.Yamaz.
- Limnophila polyantha Kurz ex Hook.f.
- Limnophila polystachya Benth.
- Limnophila pulcherrima Hook.f.
- Limnophila repens (Benth.) Benth.
- Limnophila rugosa (Roth) Merr.
- Limnophila sessiliflora (Vahl) Blume
- Limnophila siamensis T.Yamaz.
- Limnophila tillaeoides Hook.f.
- Limnophila verticillata T.Yamaz.
- Limnophila villifera Miq.
- Limnophila villosa Blume
- Limnophila wilsonii Kasselm.
