= List of trees of northern Thailand =

This is a list of forest trees of northern Thailand, organized by family. The list is from Gardner, Sidisunthorn & Anusarnsunthorn (2007).

The trees listed below can be found in the following ecoregions of Thailand:

- Northern Thailand–Laos moist deciduous forests
- Central Indochina dry forests
- Kayah–Karen montane rain forests

== Selected species ==
Some of the better known or more common species characteristic of northern Thailand are:

- Dillenia indica
- Magnolia champaca
- Magnolia × alba
- Magnolia liliifera
- Cananga odorata
- Crateva religiosa
- Crateva adansonii
- Cratoxylum cochinchinense
- Cratoxylum maingayi
- Mesua ferrea
- Mammea siamensis
- Calophyllum inophyllum
- Hydnocarpus kurzii
- Camellia oleifera
- Schima wallichii
- Anisoptera costata
- Dipterocarpus costatus
- Dipterocarpus turbinatus
- Dipterocarpus alatus
- Dipterocarpus obtusifolius
- Dipterocarpus tuberculatus
- Hopea odorata
- Shorea roxburghii
- Shorea siamensis
- Shorea obtusa
- Hibiscus tiliaceus
- Bombax ceiba
- Ceiba pentandra
- Hiptage benghalensis
- Murraya paniculata
- Aegle marmelos
- Irvingia malayana
- Ochna integerrima
- Melia azedarach
- Chukrasia tabularis
- Toona ciliata
- Ziziphus mauritiana
- Spondias pinnata
- Dracontomelon dao
- Xylia xylocarpa
- Afzelia xylocarpa
- Sindora siamensis
- Bauhinia purpurea
- Cassia fistula
- Senna siamea
- Senna alata
- Peltophorum pterocarpum
- Butea monosperma
- Pterocarpus macrocarpus
- Dalbergia oliveri
- Millettia leucantha
- Terminalia bellirica
- Terminalia chebula
- Terminalia catappa
- Terminalia alata
- Syzygium cumini
- Barringtonia acutangula
- Lagerstroemia speciosa
- Tetrameles nudiflora
- Morinda citrifolia
- Pavetta indica
- Vernonia arborea
- Alstonia scholaris
- Wrightia religiosa
- Fagraea fragrans
- Strychnos nux-vomica
- Millingtonia hortensis
- Tectona grandis
- Vitex pinnata
- Horsfieldia kingii
- Cinnamomum camphora
- Cinnamomum iners
- Aquilaria crassna
- Aleurites moluccana
- Aporosa villosa
- Baccaurea ramiflora
- Phyllanthus emblica
- Phyllanthus acidus
- Trema orientalis
- Ficus benghalensis
- Ficus altissima
- Ficus benjamina
- Ficus hispida
- Ficus racemosa
- Ficus religiosa
- Castanopsis acuminatissima
- Quercus kerrii
- Dracaena angustifolia
- Phoenix loureiroi
- Podocarpus neriifolius
- Pinus kesiya

== Dilleniales ==
=== Dilleniaceae ===
- Dillenia
  - Dillenia hookeri
  - Dillenia parviflora
  - Dillenia pentagyna
  - Dillenia aurea
  - Dillenia ovata
  - Dillenia indica

== Magnoliales ==
=== Magnoliaceae ===
- Magnolia
  - Magnolia champaca
  - Magnolia × alba
  - Magnolia floribunda
  - Magnolia rajaniana
  - Magnolia baillonii
  - Magnolia liliifera
  - Magnolia henryi
  - Magnolia garrettii

=== Annonaceae ===
- Melodorum
  - Melodorum fruticosum
- Mitrephora
  - Mitrephora maingayi
  - Mitrephora tomentosa
  - Mitrephora wangii
- Alphonsea
  - Alphonsea boniana
- Orophea
  - Orophea brandisii
  - Orophea thorelii
  - Orophea polycarpa
  - Orophea sp.
- Goniothalamus
  - Goniothalamus laoticus
  - Goniothalamus griffithii
- Miliusa
  - Miliusa velutina
  - Miliusa lineata
  - Miliusa cuneata
  - Miliusa thorelii
- Cananga
  - Cananga latifolia
  - Cananga odorata
- Polyalthia
  - Polyalthia littoralis
  - Polyalthia cerasoides
  - Polyalthia evecta
  - Polyalthia suberosa
  - Polyalthia viridis
  - Polyalthia simiarum
- Cyathocalyx
  - Cyathocalyx martabanicus

=== Myristicaceae ===
- Knema
  - Knema erratica
  - Knema linifolia
  - Knema conferta
  - Knema globularia
  - Knema furfuracea
  - Knema laurina
  - Knema cinerea
- Horsfieldia
  - Horsfieldia glabra
  - Horsfieldia kingii
  - Horsfieldia valida

== Ranunculales ==
=== Berberidaceae ===
- Mahonia
  - Mahonia nepalensis

== Brassicales ==
=== Capparaceae ===
- Crateva
  - Crateva magna
  - Crateva religiosa
  - Crateva adansonii

=== Akaniaceae ===
- Bretschneidera
  - Bretschneidera sinensis

== Apiales ==
=== Pittosporaceae ===
- Pittosporum
  - Pittosporum napaulense
  - Pittosporum kerrii

=== Araliaceae ===
- Aralia
  - Aralia montana
  - Aralia foliolosa
  - Aralia lanata
  - Aralia pectinata
  - Aralia fragrans
  - Aralia parasitica
- Brassaiopsis
  - Brassaiopsis hainla
  - Brassaiopsis glomerulata
  - Brassaiopsis ciliata
  - Brassaiopsis griffithii
  - Brassaiopsis ficifolia
- Heptapleurum
  - Heptapleurum bengalense
  - Heptapleurum calyptratum
  - Heptapleurum ellipticum
  - Heptapleurum siamense
  - Heptapleurum petelotii
  - Heptapleurum subintegrum
- Heteropanax
  - Heteropanax fragrans
- Macropanax
  - Macropanax spp.
- Trevesia
  - Trevesia palmata
  - Trevesia lateospina

== Malpighiales ==
=== Malpighiaceae ===
- Hiptage
  - Hiptage benghalensis

=== Hypericaceae ===
- Cratoxylum
  - Cratoxylum formosum
  - Cratoxylum cochinchinense
  - Cratoxylum maingayi
  - Cratoxylum sumatranum

=== Clusiaceae ===
- Garcinia
  - Garcinia thorelii
  - Garcinia mckeaniana
  - Garcinia speciosa
  - Garcinia xanthochymus
  - Garcinia merguensis
  - Garcinia cowa
  - Garcinia propinqua
  - Garcinia pedunculata

=== Calophyllaceae ===
- Mesua
  - Mesua ferrea
- Mammea
  - Mammea siamensis
- Calophyllum
  - Calophyllum inophyllum
  - Calophyllum polyanthum

=== Salicaceae ===
- Scolopia
  - Scolopia spinosa
- Xylosma
  - Xylosma brachystachys
  - Xylosma longifolium
- Homalium
  - Homalium ceylanicum
  - Homalium grandiflorum
  - Homalium tomentosum
- Flacourtia
  - Flacourtia indica
  - Flacourtia jangomas
  - Flacourtia rukam
- Casearia
  - Casearia grewiaefolia
  - Casearia flexuosa
  - Casearia flavovirens
  - Casearia graveolens
- Salix
  - Salix tetrasperma
  - Salix babylonica

=== Achariaceae ===
- Hydnocarpus
  - Hydnocarpus ilicifolia
  - Hydnocarpus kurzii
  - Hydnocarpus anthelminthica

=== Irvingiaceae ===
- Irvingia
  - Irvingia malayana

=== Ochnaceae ===
- Ochna
  - Ochna integerrima

=== Centroplacaceae ===
- Bhesa
  - Bhesa robusta

=== Chrysobalanaceae ===
- Parinari
  - Parinari anamensis

=== Rhizophoraceae ===
- Carallia
  - Carallia brachiata

=== Euphorbiaceae ===
- Euphorbia
  - Euphorbia antiquorum
- Ricinus
  - Ricinus communis
- Aleurites
  - Aleurites moluccana
- Sumbaviopsis
  - Sumbaviopsis albicans
- Cleidion
  - Cleidion spiciflorum
- Croton
  - Croton argyratus
  - Croton tiglium
  - Croton hutchinsonianus
  - Croton kerrii
  - Croton poilanei
  - Croton roxburghii
  - Croton robustus
  - Croton cascarilloides
  - Croton kongensis
- Homonoia
  - Homonoia riparia
- Macaranga
  - Macaranga denticulata
  - Macaranga siamensis
  - Macaranga kurzii
- Mallotus
  - Mallotus khasianus
  - Mallotus cuneatus
  - Mallotus barbatus
  - Mallotus oblongifolius
  - Mallotus paniculatus
  - Mallotus peltatus
  - Mallotus philippensis
- Suregada
  - Suregada multiflora
- Balakata
  - Balakata baccata
- Triadica
  - Triadica cochinchinensis
- Falconeria
  - Falconeria insignis
- Trigonostemon
  - Trigonostemon thyrsoideus
  - Trigonostemon albiflorus
- Trewia
  - Trewia nudiflora

=== Phyllanthaceae ===
- Cleistanthus
  - Cleistanthus hirsutulus
  - Cleistanthus tomentosus
- Antidesma
  - Antidesma bunius
  - Antidesma ghaesembilla
  - Antidesma sootepense
  - Antidesma acidum
  - Antidesma montanum
  - Antidesma velutinosum
- Aporosa
  - Aporosa villosa
  - Aporosa dioica
  - Aporosa wallichii
- Baccaurea
  - Baccaurea ramiflora
- Bischofia
  - Bischofia javanica
- Bridelia
  - Bridelia curtisii
  - Bridelia affinis
  - Bridelia retusa
  - Bridelia stipularis
  - Bridelia tomentosa
  - Bridelia glauca
  - Bridelia ovata
- Glochidion
  - Glochidion dasystylum
  - Glochidion assamicum
  - Glochidion acuminatum
  - Glochidion rubrum
  - Glochidion eriocarpum
  - Glochidion sphaerogynum
- Ostodes
  - Ostodes paniculata
- Phyllanthus
  - Phyllanthus emblica
  - Phyllanthus columnaris
  - Phyllanthus roseus
  - Phyllanthus acidus

== Ericales ==
=== Ericaceae ===
- Vaccinium
  - Vaccinium sprengelii
  - Vaccinium apricum
- Craibiodendron
  - Craibiodendron stellatum
- Lyonia
  - Lyonia ovalifolia
- Rhododendron
  - Rhododendron microphyton
  - Rhododendron ludwigianum
  - Rhododendron veitchianum
  - Rhododendron moulmainense
  - Rhododendron arboreum
  - Rhododendron surasianum
  - Rhododendron simsii
  - Rhododendron lyi

=== Theaceae ===
- Camellia
  - Camellia taliensis
  - Camellia connata
  - Camellia tenii
  - Camellia sinensis
  - Camellia oleifera
- Schima
  - Schima wallichii
- Gordonia
  - Gordonia dalglieshiana
- Pyrenaria
  - Pyrenaria garrettiana
  - Pyrenaria cameliaefolia

=== Pentaphylacaceae ===
- Ternstroemia
  - Ternstroemia gymnanthera
  - Ternstroemia bancana
- Adinandra
  - Adinandra integerrima
  - Adinandra laotica
  - Adinandra oblonga
- Anneslea
  - Anneslea fragrans
- Eurya
  - Eurya acuminata
  - Eurya nitida

=== Actinidiaceae ===
- Saurauia
  - Saurauia roxburghii
  - Saurauia napaulensis

=== Lecythidaceae ===
- Careya
  - Careya arborea
- Barringtonia
  - Barringtonia acutangula
  - Barringtonia augusta

=== Lythraceae ===
- Lagerstroemia
  - Lagerstroemia indica
  - Lagerstroemia loudonii
  - Lagerstroemia villosa
  - Lagerstroemia calyculata
  - Lagerstroemia tomentosa
  - Lagerstroemia floribunda
  - Lagerstroemia cochinchinensis
  - Lagerstroemia balansae
  - Lagerstroemia venusta
  - Lagerstroemia macrocarpa
  - Lagerstroemia speciosa
- Duabanga
  - Duabanga grandiflora

=== Primulaceae ===
- Ardisia
  - Ardisia corymbifera
  - Ardisia crenata
  - Ardisia attenuata
  - Ardisia kerrii
  - Ardisia quinquegona
  - Ardisia polycephala
  - Ardisia colorata
  - Ardisia nervosa
  - Ardisia virens
- Rapanea
  - Rapanea yunnanensis
- Maesa
  - Maesa perlarius
  - Maesa ramentacea
  - Maesa paniculata
  - Maesa permollis
  - Maesa glomerata
  - Maesa montana
  - Maesa indica

=== Sapotaceae ===
- Palaquium
  - Palaquium garrettii
  - Palaquium obovatum
- Payena
  - Payena lanceolata
  - Payena lucida
- Planchonella
  - Planchonella grandifolia
- Sarcosperma
  - Sarcosperma arboreum
  - Sarcosperma kachinense
- Xantolis
  - Xantolis burmanica
  - Xantolis cambodiana
  - Xantolis tomentosa

=== Ebenaceae ===
- Diospyros
  - Diospyros ferrea
  - Diospyros variegata
  - Diospyros pilosanthera
  - Diospyros dictyoneura
  - Diospyros frutescens
  - Diospyros malabarica
  - Diospyros rhodocalyx
  - Diospyros glandulosa
  - Diospyros ehretioides
  - Diospyros mollis
  - Diospyros dumetorum
  - Diospyros montana
  - Diospyros undulata
  - Diospyros martabanica
  - Diospyros coaetanea
  - Diospyros dasyphylla

=== Symplocaceae ===
- Symplocos
  - Symplocos lucida
  - Symplocos longifolia
  - Symplocos sumuntia
  - Symplocos dryophila
  - Symplocos hookeri
  - Symplocos racemosa
  - Symplocos macrophylla
  - Symplocos henschelii
  - Symplocos cochinchinensis

=== Styracaceae ===
- Styrax
  - Styrax benzoides
  - Styrax rugosum
  - Styrax benzoin

== Malvales ==
=== Dipterocarpaceae ===
- Anisoptera
  - Anisoptera costata
  - Anisoptera scaphula
- Vatica
  - Vatica harmandiana
  - Vatica odorata
- Parashorea
  - Parashorea stellata
- Dipterocarpus
  - Dipterocarpus costatus
  - Dipterocarpus turbinatus
  - Dipterocarpus alatus
  - Dipterocarpus obtusifolius
  - Dipterocarpus tuberculatus
  - Dipterocarpus retusus
- Hopea
  - Hopea odorata
- Shorea
  - Shorea roxburghii
  - Shorea farinosa
  - Shorea siamensis
  - Shorea obtusa
  - Shorea guiso
  - Shorea thorelii

=== Malvaceae ===
==== Malvoideae ====
- Kydia
  - Kydia calycina
- Hibiscus
  - Hibiscus macrophyllus
  - Hibiscus tiliaceus
  - Hibiscus glanduliferus
  - Hibiscus mutabilis

==== Bombacoideae ====
- Bombax
  - Bombax ceiba
  - Bombax anceps
  - Bombax insigne
- Ceiba
  - Ceiba pentandra
- Pachira
  - Pachira aquatica

==== Byttnerioideae ====
- Abroma
  - Abroma augusta
- Melochia
  - Melochia umbellata

==== Helicteroideae ====
- Helicteres
  - Helicteres angustifolia
  - Helicteres elongata
  - Helicteres hirsuta
  - Helicteres isora
  - Helicteres lanata
  - Helicteres lanceolata
  - Helicteres viscida
- Reevesia
  - Reevesia pubescens

==== Sterculioideae ====
- Pterygota
  - Pterygota alata
- Sterculia
  - Sterculia pexa
  - Sterculia foetida
  - Sterculia urens
  - Sterculia villosa
  - Sterculia hypochroa
  - Sterculia balanghas
  - Sterculia guttata
  - Sterculia lanceolata
- Firmiana
  - Firmiana colorata
  - Firmiana kerrii
- Pterocymbium
  - Pterocymbium macranthum
  - Pterocymbium tinctorium

==== Dombeyoideae ====
- Pterospermum
  - Pterospermum cinnamomeum
  - Pterospermum lanceifolium
  - Pterospermum littorale
  - Pterospermum acerifolium
  - Pterospermum grande
  - Pterospermum grandiflorum
  - Pterospermum diversifolium
  - Pterospermum semisagittatum
- Eriolaena
  - Eriolaena candollei
- Schoutenia
  - Schoutenia glomerata
  - Schoutenia ovata

==== Brownlowioideae ====
- Pentace
  - Pentace burmanica
- Brownlowia
  - Brownlowia peltata
- Berrya
  - Berrya mollis
  - Berrya cordifolia

==== Grewioideae ====
- Colona
  - Colona winitii
  - Colona elobata
  - Colona auriculata
  - Colona floribunda
  - Colona flagrocarpa
- Grewia
  - Grewia eriocarpa
  - Grewia winitii
  - Grewia sessilifolia
  - Grewia abutilifolia
  - Grewia lacei
  - Grewia laevigata
  - Grewia hirsuta
- Microcos
  - Microcos paniculata
  - Microcos tomentosa

=== Muntingiaceae ===
- Muntingia
  - Muntingia calabura

=== Thymelaeaceae ===
- Aquilaria
  - Aquilaria crassna

== Oxalidales ==
=== Elaeocarpaceae ===
- Elaeocarpus
  - Elaeocarpus floribundus
  - Elaeocarpus hainanensis
  - Elaeocarpus rugosus
  - Elaeocarpus petiolatus
  - Elaeocarpus stipularis
  - Elaeocarpus braceanus
  - Elaeocarpus robustus
  - Elaeocarpus sphaericus
  - Elaeocarpus hygrophilus
  - Elaeocarpus lanceifolius
  - Elaeocarpus prunifolius
- Sloanea
  - Sloanea tomentosa
  - Sloanea sigun

== Sapindales ==
=== Rutaceae ===
- Glycosmis
  - Glycosmis esquirolii
  - Glycosmis ovoidea
  - Glycosmis puberula
  - Glycosmis cochinchinensis
- Acronychia
  - Acronychia pedunculata
- Atalantia
  - Atalantia roxburghiana
  - Atalantia monophylla
- Murraya
  - Murraya paniculata
  - Murraya koenigii
- Aegle
  - Aegle marmelos
- Feronia
  - Feronia limonia
- Euodia
  - Euodia meliaefolia
  - Euodia triphylla
  - Euodia viticina
  - Euodia glomerata
- Micromelum
  - Micromelum minutum
  - Micromelum falcatum
  - Micromelum hirsutum
- Clausena
  - Clausena excavata
- Zanthoxylum
  - Zanthoxylum rhetsa
  - Zanthoxylum acanthopodium
  - Zanthoxylum nitidum
  - Zanthoxylum evodiaefolium
  - Zanthoxylum myriacanthum
- Harrisonia
  - Harrisonia perforata

=== Simaroubaceae ===
- Ailanthus
  - Ailanthus triphysa
- Picrasma
  - Picrasma javanica
- Eurycoma
  - Eurycoma longifolia
- Brucea
  - Brucea mollis
  - Brucea javanica

=== Burseraceae ===
- Protium
  - Protium serratum
- Garuga
  - Garuga pinnata
  - Garuga floribunda
  - Garuga pierrei
- Canarium
  - Canarium subulatum
  - Canarium strictum
  - Canarium euphyllum

=== Meliaceae ===
- Walsura
  - Walsura robusta
  - Walsura intermedia
  - Walsura trichostemon
- Cipadessa
  - Cipadessa baccifera
- Melia
  - Melia toosendan
  - Melia dubia
  - Melia azedarach
  - Melia indica
- Dysoxylum
  - Dysoxylum cochinchinense
  - Dysoxylum excelsum
  - Dysoxylum andamanicum
- Chisocheton
  - Chisocheton siamensis
- Sandoricum
  - Sandoricum koetjape
- Aglaia
  - Aglaia lawii
  - Aglaia chittagonga
  - Aglaia grandis
- Aphanamixis
  - Aphanamixis polystachya
- Chukrasia
  - Chukrasia tabularis
  - Chukrasia velutina
- Toona
  - Toona ciliata
  - Toona microcarpa
  - Toona sureni
- Trichilia
  - Trichilia connaroides

=== Sapindaceae ===
- Allophylus
  - Allophylus cobbe
- Nephelium
  - Nephelium hypoleucum
  - Nephelium lappaceum
- Sisyrolepis
  - Sisyrolepis muricata
- Xerospermum
  - Xerospermum noronhianum
- Arytera
  - Arytera littoralis
- Pometia
  - Pometia pinnata
- Harpullia
  - Harpullia arborea
  - Harpullia cupanioides
- Schleichera
  - Schleichera oleosa
- Dimocarpus
  - Dimocarpus longan
- Litchi
  - Litchi chinensis
- Lepisanthes
  - Lepisanthes rubiginosa
  - Lepisanthes tetraphylla
- Arfeuillea
  - Arfeuillea arborescens
- Sapindus
  - Sapindus rarak
- Mischocarpus
  - Mischocarpus pentapetalus
- Aesculus
  - Aesculus assamica
- Acer
  - Acer laurinum
  - Acer oblongum
  - Acer chiangdaoense
  - Acer thomsonii
  - Acer wilsonii
  - Acer calcaratum

=== Anacardiaceae ===
- Bouea
  - Bouea oppositifolia
  - Bouea racemosus
- Holigarna
  - Holigarna kurzii
- Mangifera
  - Mangifera sylvatica
  - Mangifera caloneura
  - Mangifera odorata
  - Mangifera indica
- Buchanania
  - Buchanania arborescens
  - Buchanania glabra
  - Buchanania lanzan
  - Buchanania reticulata
- Gluta
  - Gluta obovata
  - Gluta usitata
- Semecarpus
  - Semecarpus cochinchinensis
- Rhus
  - Rhus chinensis
  - Rhus succedanea
  - Rhus rhetsoides
- Choerospondias
  - Choerospondias axillaris
- Spondias
  - Spondias pinnata
  - Spondias lakonensis
- Lannea
  - Lannea coromandelica
- Dracontomelon
  - Dracontomelon dao

== Santalales ==
=== Schoepfiaceae ===
- Schoepfia
  - Schoepfia fragrans

=== Olacaceae ===
- Anacolosa
  - Anacolosa ilicoides

== Aquifoliales ==
=== Aquifoliaceae ===
- Ilex
  - Ilex umbellulata
  - Ilex godajam
  - Ilex englishii

=== Cardiopteridaceae ===
- Gonocaryum
  - Gonocaryum lobbianum

=== Stemonuraceae ===
- Gomphandra
  - Gomphandra tetrandra

== Metteniusales ==
=== Metteniusaceae ===
- Apodytes
  - Apodytes dimidiata

== Icacinales ==
=== Icacinaceae ===
- Nothapodytes
  - Nothapodytes foetida
- Pittosporopsis
  - Pittosporopsis kerrii
- Platea
  - Platea latifolia

== Celastrales ==
=== Celastraceae ===
- Microtropis
  - Microtropis pallens
- Maytenus
  - Maytenus stylosa
  - Maytenus marcanii
- Euonymus
  - Euonymus similis
  - Euonymus colonoides
  - Euonymus mitratus
- Glyptopetalum
  - Glyptopetalum sclerocarpum
- Lophopetalum
  - Lophopetalum wallichii
- Siphonodon
  - Siphonodon celastrineus

== Rosales ==
=== Rhamnaceae ===
- Ziziphus
  - Ziziphus rugosa
  - Ziziphus incurva
  - Ziziphus nummularia
  - Ziziphus mauritiana

=== Rosaceae ===
- Prunus
  - Prunus cerasoides
  - Prunus persica
  - Prunus arborea
  - Prunus phaeosticta
  - Prunus javanica
  - Prunus wallichii
  - Prunus ceylanica
- Eriobotrya
  - Eriobotrya bengalensis
  - Eriobotrya japonica

=== Moraceae ===
- Morus
  - Morus macroura
  - Morus alba
  - Morus australis
- Broussonetia
  - Broussonetia papyrifera
- Streblus
  - Streblus asper
  - Streblus ilicifolius
  - Streblus taxoides
  - Streblus indicus
- Artocarpus
  - Artocarpus lakoocha
  - Artocarpus gomezianus
  - Artocarpus chaplasha
  - Artocarpus lanceolata
- Maclura
  - Maclura fruticosa
- Ficus
  - Ficus elastica
  - Ficus benghalensis
  - Ficus altissima
  - Ficus annulata
  - Ficus auriculata
  - Ficus benjamina
  - Ficus callosa
  - Ficus capillipes
  - Ficus curtipes
  - Ficus fistulosa
  - Ficus fulva
  - Ficus geniculata
  - Ficus glaberrima
  - Ficus heteropleura
  - Ficus heterophylla
  - Ficus hirta
  - Ficus hispida
  - Ficus lacor
  - Ficus microcarpa
  - Ficus nervosa
  - Ficus pisocarpa
  - Ficus racemosa
  - Ficus religiosa
  - Ficus rumphii
  - Ficus semicordata
  - Ficus superba
  - Ficus variegata
  - Ficus virens

=== Urticaceae ===
- Maoutia
  - Maoutia puya
- Dendrocnide
  - Dendrocnide sinuata
  - Dendrocnide stimulans
- Boehmeria
  - Boehmeria clidemioides
  - Boehmeria chiangmaiensis
  - Boehmeria macrophylla
  - Boehmeria malabarica
  - Boehmeria thailandica
  - Boehmeria zollingeriana
- Debregeasia
  - Debregeasia longifolia
  - Debregeasia squamata
  - Debregeasia wallichiana

=== Cannabaceae ===
- Trema
  - Trema orientalis
- Celtis
  - Celtis tetrandra
  - Celtis timorensis

=== Ulmaceae ===
- Holoptelea
  - Holoptelea integrifolia
- Ulmus
  - Ulmus lancifolia

== Crossosomatales ==
=== Staphyleaceae ===
- Turpinia
  - Turpinia pomifera
  - Turpinia nepalensis

== Fabales ==
=== Polygalaceae ===
- Xanthophyllum
  - Xanthophyllum virens
  - Xanthophyllum flavescens

=== Fabaceae ===
- Ormosia
  - Ormosia sumatrana

==== Mimosoideae ====
- Mimosa
  - Mimosa spp.
- Acacia
  - Acacia harmandiana
- Adenanthera
  - Adenanthera microsperma
  - Adenanthera pavonina
- Albizia
  - Albizia lucidior
  - Albizia lebbeck
  - Albizia crassiramea
  - Albizia procera
  - Albizia odoratissima
  - Albizia garrettii
  - Albizia lebbekoides
  - Albizia chinensis
- Archidendron
  - Archidendron clypearia
  - Archidendron lucidum
  - Archidendron jiringa
  - Archidendron glomeriflorum
- Xylia
  - Xylia xylocarpa
- Parkia
  - Parkia leiophylla
  - Parkia sumatrana
  - Parkia timoriana
  - Parkia fraxinifolius
- Pithecellobium
  - Pithecellobium tenue

==== Caesalpinioideae ====
- Caesalpinia
  - Caesalpinia sappan
- Senna
  - Senna siamea
  - Senna timoriensis
  - Senna surattensis
  - Senna sulfurea
  - Senna spectabilis
  - Senna alata
- Cassia
  - Cassia fistula
  - Cassia garrettiana
  - Cassia bakeriana
  - Cassia grandis
  - Cassia agnes
  - Cassia javanica
- Peltophorum
  - Peltophorum dasyrrhachis
  - Peltophorum pterocarpum

==== Detarioideae ====
- Afzelia
  - Afzelia xylocarpa
- Sindora
  - Sindora siamensis

==== Cercidoideae ====
- Bauhinia
  - Bauhinia variegata
  - Bauhinia purpurea
  - Bauhinia racemosa
  - Bauhinia malabarica
  - Bauhinia brachycarpa
  - Bauhinia saccocalyx

==== Phaseoleae ====
- Butea
  - Butea monosperma
  - Butea superba
- Erythrina
  - Erythrina stricta
  - Erythrina subumbrans
  - Erythrina suberosa

==== Faboideae ====
- Pterocarpus
  - Pterocarpus macrocarpus
  - Pterocarpus indicus
- Dalbergia
  - Dalbergia nigrescens
  - Dalbergia lanceolaria
  - Dalbergia rimosa
  - Dalbergia ovata
  - Dalbergia oliveri
  - Dalbergia cana
  - Dalbergia cultrata
  - Dalbergia assamica
  - Dalbergia sericea
  - Dalbergia stipulacea
- Callerya
  - Callerya atropurpurea
- Millettia
  - Millettia macrostachya
  - Millettia leucantha
  - Millettia pubinervis
  - Millettia brandisiana
- Derris
  - Derris robusta

== Myrtales ==
=== Combretaceae ===
- Terminalia
  - Terminalia bellirica
  - Terminalia chebula
  - Terminalia catappa
  - Terminalia mucronata
  - Terminalia glaucifolia
  - Terminalia calamansanai
  - Terminalia myriocarpa
  - Terminalia alata
  - Terminalia cambodiana
  - Terminalia triptera
  - Terminalia franchetii
- Combretum
  - Combretum quadrangulare
  - Combretum apetalum
  - Combretum winitii
  - Combretum deciduum
  - Combretum trifoliatum
  - Combretum decandrum
  - Combretum acuminatum

=== Myrtaceae ===
- Eugenia
  - Eugenia bracteata
- Syzygium
  - Syzygium zeylanicum
  - Syzygium gratum
  - Syzygium cerasiforme
  - Syzygium helferi
  - Syzygium thumra
  - Syzygium grande
  - Syzygium glaucum
  - Syzygium globiflorum
  - Syzygium angkae
  - Syzygium polyanthum
  - Syzygium winitii
  - Syzygium balsameum
  - Syzygium ripicola
  - Syzygium megacarpum
  - Syzygium formosum
  - Syzygium siamense
  - Syzygium diospyrifolium
  - Syzygium jambos
  - Syzygium cumini
  - Syzygium fruticosum
  - Syzygium albiflorum
  - Syzygium zimmermannii
  - Syzygium claviflorum
  - Syzygium cinereum
- Cleistocalyx
  - Cleistocalyx operculatus
  - Cleistocalyx nervosum
- Decaspermum
  - Decaspermum parviflorum
- Tristaniopsis
  - Tristaniopsis burmanica

=== Melastomataceae ===
- Memecylon
  - Memecylon plebejum
  - Memecylon scutellatum

=== Crypteroniaceae ===
- Crypteronia
  - Crypteronia paniculata

== Cucurbitales ==
=== Tetramelaceae ===
- Tetrameles
  - Tetrameles nudiflora

== Cornales ==
=== Cornaceae ===
- Alangium
  - Alangium salviifolium
  - Alangium barbatum
  - Alangium kurzii
  - Alangium chinense

=== Nyssaceae ===
- Nyssa
  - Nyssa javanica
- Mastixia
  - Mastixia euonymoides

== Dipsacales ==
=== Adoxaceae ===
- Viburnum
  - Viburnum inopinatum
  - Viburnum cylindricum
  - Viburnum foetidum
- Sambucus
  - Sambucus javanica
  - Sambucus simpsonii

== Gentianales ==
=== Rubiaceae ===
- Adina
  - Adina cordifolia
- Breonia (syn. Anthocephalus)
  - Breonia chinensis (syn. Anthocephalus chinensis)
- Canthium
  - Canthium glabrum
  - Canthium umbellatum
  - Canthium parvifolium
- Catunaregam
  - Catunaregam spathulifolia
  - Catunaregam spinosa
  - Catunaregam longispina
  - Catunaregam tomentosa
- Ceriscoides
  - Ceriscoides sessilifolia
  - Ceriscoides turgida
- Fagerlindia
  - Fagerlindia plumbea
- Gardenia
  - Gardenia sootepensis
  - Gardenia obtusifolia
- Hymenodictyon
  - Hymenodictyon orixense
  - Hymenodictyon excelsum
- Hyptianthera
  - Hyptianthera bracteata
  - Hyptianthera stricta
- Ixora
  - Ixora kerrii
- Lasianthus
  - Lasianthus hookeri
  - Lasianthus kurzii
- Meyna
  - Meyna spp.
- Mycetia
  - Mycetia chasalioides
  - Mycetia rivicola
  - Mycetia longifolia
- Psychotria
  - Psychotria monticola
  - Psychotria ophioxyloides
- Nauclea
  - Nauclea orientalis
- Mitragyna
  - Mitragyna rotundifolia
  - Mitragyna hirsuta
  - Mitragyna diversifolia
  - Mitragyna parvifolia
  - Mitragyna trichotoma
- Morinda
  - Morinda tomentosa
  - Morinda citrifolia
- Pavetta
  - Pavetta indica
- Rothmannia
  - Rothmannia sootepensis
- Schizomussaenda
  - Schizomussaenda dehiscens
- Tarenna
  - Tarenna vanprukii
- Tarennoidea
  - Tarennoidea wallichii
- Vangueria
  - Vangueria pubescens
  - Vangueria spinosa
- Wendlandia
  - Wendlandia tinctoria
  - Wendlandia scabra

=== Apocynaceae ===
- Rauvolfia
  - Rauvolfia verticillata
- Carissa
  - Carissa spinarum
- Hunteria
  - Hunteria zeylanica
- Tabernaemontana
  - Tabernaemontana corymbosa
  - Tabernaemontana bovina
  - Tabernaemontana divaricata
  - Tabernaemontana peduncularis
  - Tabernaemontana bufalina
- Kibatalia
  - Kibatalia macrophylla
- Kopsia
  - Kopsia arborea
- Alstonia
  - Alstonia scholaris
  - Alstonia rostrata
  - Alstonia rupestris
  - Alstonia macrophylla
- Holarrhena
  - Holarrhena pubescens
  - Holarrhena curtisii
- Wrightia
  - Wrightia arborea
  - Wrightia religiosa
  - Wrightia coccinea
  - Wrightia pubescens

=== Gentianaceae ===
- Fagraea
  - Fagraea ceilanica
  - Fagraea fragrans

=== Loganiaceae ===
- Strychnos
  - Strychnos nux-blanda
  - Strychnos nux-vomica

== Asterales ==
=== Asteraceae ===
- Gochnatia
  - Gochnatia decora
- Vernonia
  - Vernonia volkameriifolia
  - Vernonia parishii
  - Vernonia arborea

== Lamiales ==
=== Oleaceae ===
- Fraxinus
  - Fraxinus floribunda
- Schrebera
  - Schrebera swietenioides
- Chionanthus
  - Chionanthus ramiflorus
  - Chionanthus caudifolius = Linociera caudata
  - Chionanthus sutepensis = Linociera sutepensis
- Ligustrum
  - Ligustrum confusum
- Olea
  - Olea rosea
  - Olea oblanceolata
  - Olea salicifolia
  - Olea dioica

=== Scrophulariaceae ===
- Buddleja
  - Buddleja asiatica

=== Paulowniaceae ===
- Wightia
  - Wightia speciosissima

=== Bignoniaceae ===
- Santisukia
  - Santisukia kerrii
- Pauldopia
  - Pauldopia ghorta
- Markhamia
  - Markhamia stipulata
- Fernandoa
  - Fernandoa adenophylla
  - Fernandoa collignonii
- Dolichandrone
  - Dolichandrone serrulata
  - Dolichandrone columnaris
- Radermachera
  - Radermachera eberhardtii
  - Radermachera ignea
- Stereospermum
  - Stereospermum fimbriatum
  - Stereospermum cylindricum
  - Stereospermum colais
  - Stereospermum neuranthum
- Oroxylum
  - Oroxylum indicum
- Millingtonia
  - Millingtonia hortensis
- Heterophragma
  - Heterophragma sulfureum

=== Lamiaceae ===
- Clerodendrum
  - Clerodendrum colebrookianum
  - Clerodendrum disparifolium
  - Clerodendrum fragrans
  - Clerodendrum garrettianum
  - Clerodendrum infortunatum
  - Clerodendrum paniculatum
  - Clerodendrum villosum
- Gmelina
  - Gmelina arborea
- Tectona
  - Tectona grandis
- Callicarpa
  - Callicarpa arborea
  - Callicarpa rubella
- Premna
  - Premna latifolia
  - Premna villosa
  - Premna pyramidata
- Vitex
  - Vitex trifolia
  - Vitex limonifolia
  - Vitex pinnata
  - Vitex peduncularis
  - Vitex glabrata
  - Vitex vestita
  - Vitex canescens
  - Vitex quinata

== Boraginales ==
=== Boraginaceae ===
- Ehretia
  - Ehretia acuminata
  - Ehretia laevis

== Solanales ==
=== Solanaceae ===
- Solanum
  - Solanum verbascifolium

== Laurales ==
=== Lauraceae ===
- Machilus
  - Machilus cochinchinensis
- Actinodaphne
  - Actinodaphne henryi
  - Actinodaphne montana
- Litsea
  - Litsea wightiana
  - Litsea semecarpifolia
  - Litsea firma
  - Litsea albicans
  - Litsea cubeba
  - Litsea salicifolia
  - Litsea glutinosa
  - Litsea monopetala
- Neolitsea
  - Neolitsea cassia
- Lindera
  - Lindera caudata
- Cinnamomum
  - Cinnamomum porrectum
  - Cinnamomum camphora
  - Cinnamomum iners
  - Cinnamomum caudatum
  - Cinnamomum verum
- Phoebe
  - Phoebe lanceolata
  - Phoebe paniculata
  - Phoebe cathia
- Persea
  - Persea gamblei
- Nothaphoebe
  - Nothaphoebe umbelliflora
- Alseodaphne
  - Alseodaphne spp.
- Cryptocarya
  - Cryptocarya pallens
- Potameia
  - Potameia spp.
- Beilschmiedia
  - Beilschmiedia spp.

== Proteales ==
=== Proteaceae ===
- Helicia
  - Helicia nilagirica
  - Helicia formosana
  - Helicia terminalis

=== Sabiaceae ===
- Meliosma
  - Meliosma simplicifolia
  - Meliosma pinnata

== Fagales ==
=== Juglandaceae ===
- Engelhardia
  - Engelhardia spicata
  - Engelhardia serrata

=== Betulaceae ===
- Betula
  - Betula alnoides
- Carpinus
  - Carpinus londoniana
  - Carpinus poilanei

=== Myricaceae ===
- Myrica
  - Myrica esculenta

=== Fagaceae ===
- Castanopsis
  - Castanopsis acuminatissima
  - Castanopsis argyrophylla
  - Castanopsis armata
  - Castanopsis calathiformis
  - Castanopsis diversifolia
  - Castanopsis indica
  - Castanopsis tribuloides
- Lithocarpus
  - Lithocarpus dealbatus
  - Lithocarpus aggregatus
  - Lithocarpus craibianus
  - Lithocarpus elegans
  - Lithocarpus fenestratus
  - Lithocarpus garrettianus
  - Lithocarpus echinops
  - Lithocarpus lindleyanus
  - Lithocarpus polystachyus
  - Lithocarpus sootepensis
  - Lithocarpus truncatus
  - Lithocarpus thomsonii
- Quercus
  - Quercus incana
  - Quercus aliena
  - Quercus brandisiana
  - Quercus eumorpha
  - Quercus kerrii
  - Quercus kingiana
  - Quercus lanata
  - Quercus lenticellata
  - Quercus lineata
  - Quercus mespilifolioides
  - Quercus semiserrata
  - Quercus vestita

== Asparagales ==
=== Asparagaceae ===
- Dracaena
  - Dracaena loureiri
  - Dracaena angustifolia

== Pandanales ==
=== Pandanaceae ===
- Pandanus
  - Pandanus spp.

== Arecales ==
=== Arecaceae ===
- Livistona
  - Livistona speciosa
  - Livistona jenkinsiana
  - Livistona chinensis
- Trachycarpus
  - Trachycarpus oreophilus
- Corypha
  - Corypha umbraculifera
  - Corypha utan
- Borassus
  - Borassus flabellifer
- Caryota
  - Caryota gigas
  - Caryota urens
  - Caryota mitis
- Wallichia
  - Wallichia siamensis
- Pinanga
  - Pinanga sylvestris
- Areca
  - Areca triandra
  - Areca laosensis
  - Areca catechu
- Arenga
  - Arenga westerhoutii
  - Arenga pinnata
- Phoenix
  - Phoenix loureiri

== Pinales ==
=== Cupressaceae ===
- Calocedrus
  - Calocedrus macrolepis

=== Taxaceae ===
- Cephalotaxus
  - Cephalotaxus griffithii

=== Podocarpaceae ===
- Podocarpus
  - Podocarpus neriifolius
- Dacrycarpus
  - Dacrycarpus imbricatus
- Nageia
  - Nageia wallichiana
- Dacrydium
  - Dacrydium elatum

=== Pinaceae ===
- Pinus
  - Pinus kesiya
  - Pinus latteri

== Cycadales ==
=== Cycadaceae ===
- Cycas
  - Cycas pectinata
  - Cycas siamensis
  - Cycas simplicipinna

== Cyatheales ==
=== Cyatheaceae ===
- Cyathea
  - Cyathea gigantea
  - Cyathea chinensis
  - Cyathea spinulosa
  - Cyathea podophylla
  - Cyathea latebrosa

== See also ==
- List of plants of Doi Suthep–Pui National Park
- List of Thai provincial trees
