= Syzygium cerasiforme =

Conservation status
- Least Concern (IUCN 3.1)

Scientific classification
- Kingdom: Plantae
- Clade: Tracheophytes
- Clade: Angiosperms
- Clade: Eudicots
- Clade: Rosids
- Order: Myrtales
- Family: Myrtaceae
- Genus: Syzygium
- Species: S. cerasiforme

Binomial name
- Syzygium cerasiforme (Blume) Merr. & L.M.Perry

Synonyms
- List: Clavimyrtus latifolia Blume; Clavimyrtus lineata (DC.) Blume; Clavimyrtus lineata var. membranacea Blume; Clavimyrtus lineata var. procera Blume; Clavimyrtus lineata var. varingiifolia Blume; Clavimyrtus symphytocarpa Blume; Eugenia cerasiformis (Blume) DC.; Eugenia lineata (DC.) Duthie; Eugenia longicalyx Ridl.; Eugenia longiflora (C.Presl) Fern.-Vill.; Eugenia marivelesensis Merr.; Eugenia miquelii Elmer; Eugenia rubricaulis (Miq.) Duthie; Eugenia teysmannii (Miq.) Koord. & Valeton; Jambosa cerasiformis (Blume) Hassk.; Jambosa latifolia (Blume) Miq.; Jambosa lineata DC.; Jambosa rubricaule Miq.; Jambosa symphytocarpa (Blume) Korth. ex Miq.; Jambosa teysmannii Miq.; Myrtus cerasiformis Blume; Myrtus lineata Blume; Syzygium lineatum (DC.) Merr. & L.M.Perry; Syzygium longicalyx (Ridl.) Masam.; Syzygium longiflorum C.Presl; Syzygium teysmannii (Miq.) Masam.

Species of plant

Syzygium cerasiforme, the common kelat, is a widespread species of flowering plant in the family Myrtaceae. It is native to Guangxi in China, Southeast Asia, western Malesia, and the Philippines. An evergreen tree usually 10 m (33 ft) tall, but reaching up to 22 m (72 ft), it is found in a variety of habitats, including coastal areas, savannas, and forests, up to 1,000 m (3,300 ft). Under its synonym Syzygium lineatum it has been assessed as Least Concern, and is considered hyperdominant.
