= Quercus eumorpha =

Conservation status
- Data Deficient (IUCN 3.1)

Scientific classification
- Kingdom: Plantae
- Clade: Embryophytes
- Clade: Tracheophytes
- Clade: Spermatophytes
- Clade: Angiosperms
- Clade: Eudicots
- Clade: Rosids
- Order: Fagales
- Family: Fagaceae
- Genus: Quercus
- Subgenus: Quercus subg. Cerris
- Section: Quercus sect. Cyclobalanopsis
- Species: Q. eumorpha

Binomial name
- Quercus eumorpha Kurz

Synonyms
- Cyclobalanopsis eumorpha (Kurz) Schottky; Lithocarpus eumorphus (Kurz) A.Camus; Quercus eumorpha subsp. yaiensis Menitsky

Species of flowering plant

Quercus eumorpha is a species of oak. It is a very large forest tree which grows in dry evergreen forests from 1,550 to 2,100 metres elevation. The IUCN Red List says it is known only from Doi Inthanon National Park in northern Thailand, and may also be native nearby eastern Myanmar. According to Plants of the World Online it is endemic to southern Myanmar.
