= Syzygium glaucum =

Conservation status
- Least Concern (IUCN 2.3)

Scientific classification
- Kingdom: Plantae
- Clade: Tracheophytes
- Clade: Angiosperms
- Clade: Eudicots
- Clade: Rosids
- Order: Myrtales
- Family: Myrtaceae
- Genus: Syzygium
- Species: S. glaucum

Binomial name
- Syzygium glaucum (King) Chantar. & J.Parn.

Synonyms
- Eugenia glauca King; Eugenia glauca var. pseudoglauca King; Eugenia pseudoglauca (King) Ridl.

Species of flowering plant

Syzygium glaucum is a species of flowering plant in the family Myrtaceae. It is a tree native to Myanmar, Thailand, Peninsular Malaysia, and Singapore.
