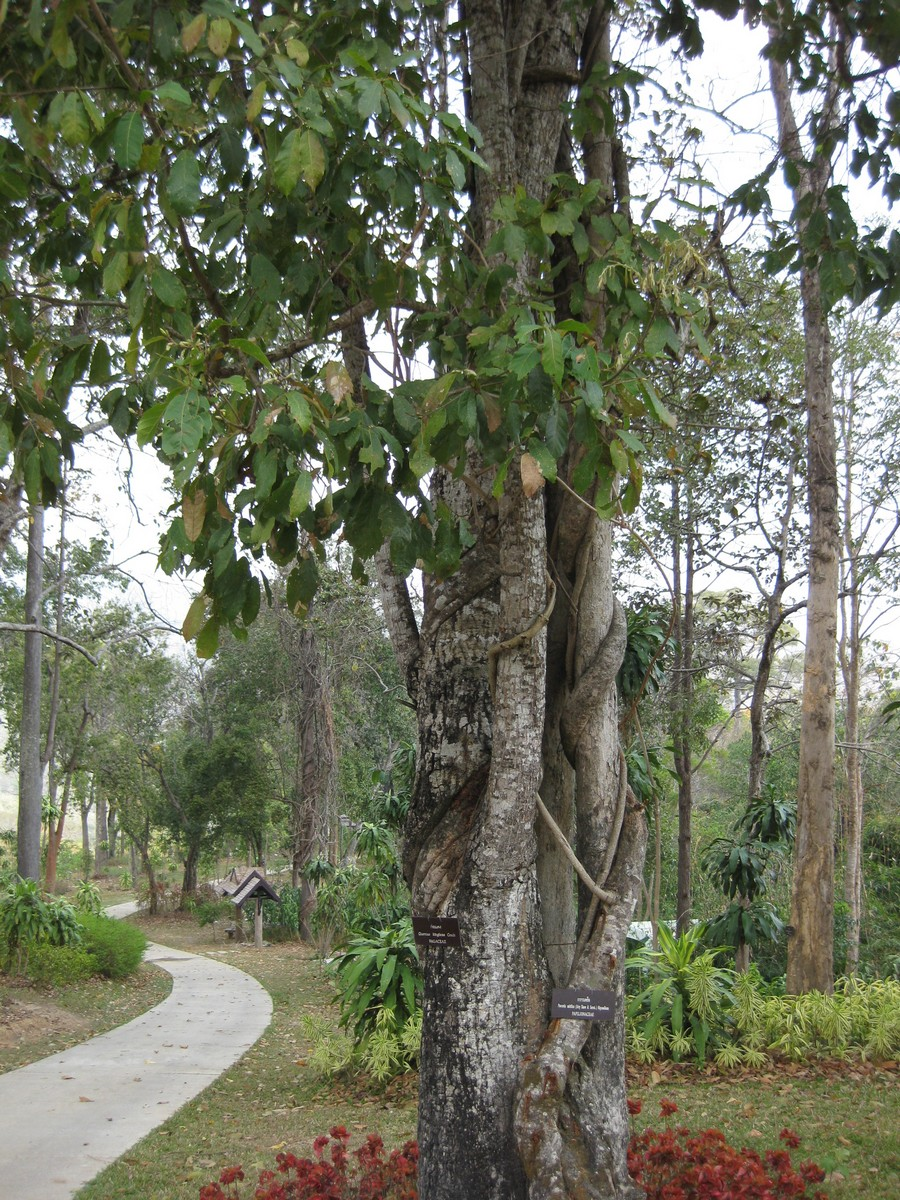

Conservation status
- Endangered (IUCN 3.1)

Scientific classification
- Kingdom: Plantae
- Clade: Embryophytes
- Clade: Tracheophytes
- Clade: Spermatophytes
- Clade: Angiosperms
- Clade: Eudicots
- Clade: Rosids
- Order: Fagales
- Family: Fagaceae
- Genus: Quercus
- Subgenus: Quercus subg. Cerris
- Section: Quercus sect. Ilex
- Species: Q. kingiana

Binomial name
- Quercus kingiana Craib

= Quercus kingiana =

Species of flowering plant

Quercus kingiana is a species of oak. It is a tree native to Myanmar, northern and central Thailand, and Yunnan Province of south-central China. It grows in tropical and subtropical dry deciduous oak forests and mixed deciduous forests on limestone soils from 750 to 1,600 metres elevation. Few populations are known, and most are severely fragmented. The IUCN Red List assesses the species as Endangered, with a declining population of likely fewer than 2,500 individuals.

The species was described by William Grant Craib in 1911.
