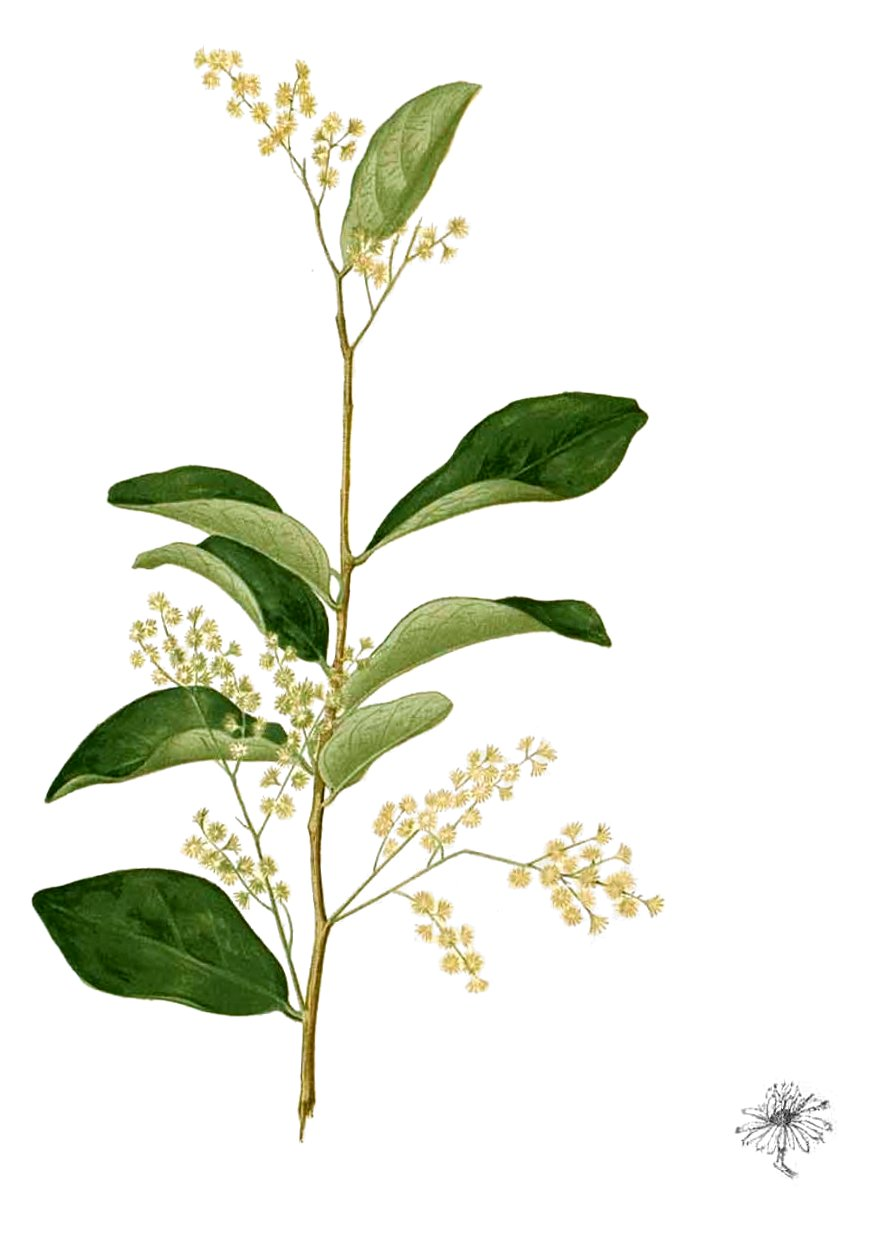
- Illustration from the 1880s

Scientific classification
- Kingdom: Plantae
- Clade: Embryophytes
- Clade: Tracheophytes
- Clade: Spermatophytes
- Clade: Angiosperms
- Clade: Eudicots
- Clade: Rosids
- Order: Malpighiales
- Family: Salicaceae
- Genus: Homalium
- Species: H. grandiflorum

Binomial name
- Homalium grandiflorum Benth.

= Homalium grandiflorum =

Species of plant

Homalium grandiflorum is a rainforest tree of the family Salicaceae native to Southeast Asia.

A specimen in the Singapore Botanic Gardens was noted as flowering only about once every twenty years.
