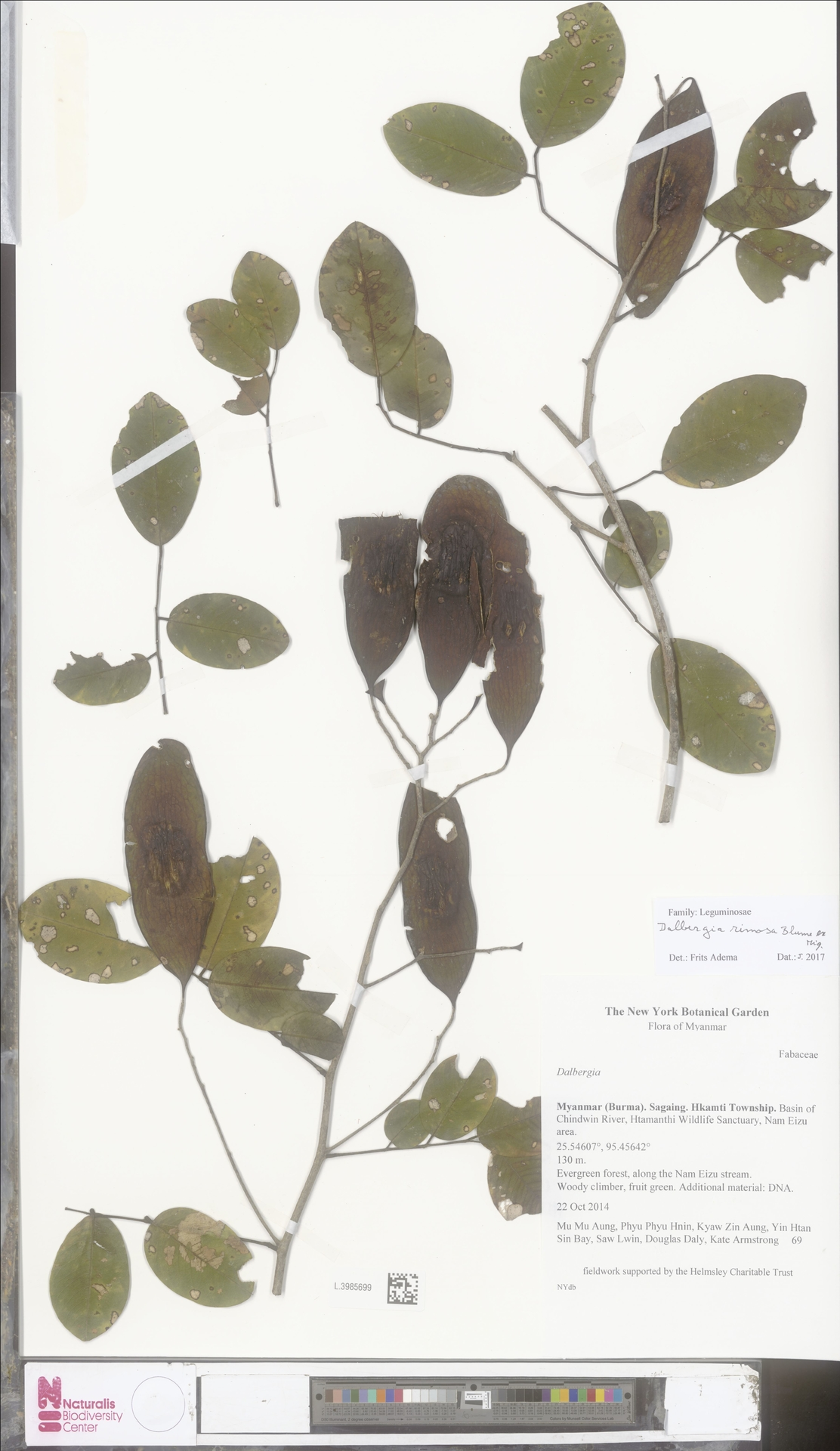

Conservation status
- Least Concern (IUCN 3.1)

Scientific classification
- Kingdom: Plantae
- Clade: Embryophytes
- Clade: Tracheophytes
- Clade: Spermatophytes
- Clade: Angiosperms
- Clade: Eudicots
- Clade: Rosids
- Order: Fabales
- Family: Fabaceae
- Subfamily: Faboideae
- Genus: Dalbergia
- Species: D. rimosa

Binomial name
- Dalbergia rimosa Roxb.

Synonyms
- Dalbergia discolor Blume

= Dalbergia rimosa =

Species of legume

Dalbergia rimosa is a species of liana (or treelet), with the Vietnamese name trắc giây or trắc dây. The synonym Dalbergia discolor, with the Vietnamese name trắc biến màu, is no longer recognised. The genus Dalbergia is placed in the subfamily Faboideae and tribe Dalbergieae.

== Subspecies ==
The Catalogue of Life lists:

- D. r. foliacea (Benth.) Thoth. (Vietnamese: trắc lá)
- D. r. griffithii
- D. r. laevis
- D. r. rimosa
