= Schizomussaenda =

Conservation status
- Least Concern (IUCN 3.1)

Scientific classification
- Kingdom: Plantae
- Clade: Tracheophytes
- Clade: Angiosperms
- Clade: Eudicots
- Clade: Asterids
- Order: Gentianales
- Family: Rubiaceae
- Genus: Schizomussaenda; H.L.Li
- Species: S. henryi

Binomial name
- Schizomussaenda henryi (Hutch.) X.F.Deng & D.X.Zhang

Synonyms
- Mussaenda henryi Hutch.; Schizophragma macrosepalum Hu; Emmenopterys rehderi F.P.Metcalf; Mussaenda dehiscens Craib; Mussaenda elongata Hutch.; Schizomussaenda dehiscens (Craib) H.L.Li

Genus of plants

Schizomussaenda is a monotypic genus of flowering plants belonging to the family Rubiaceae. The only species is Schizomussaenda henryi.

Its native range is Indo-China to Southern China.
