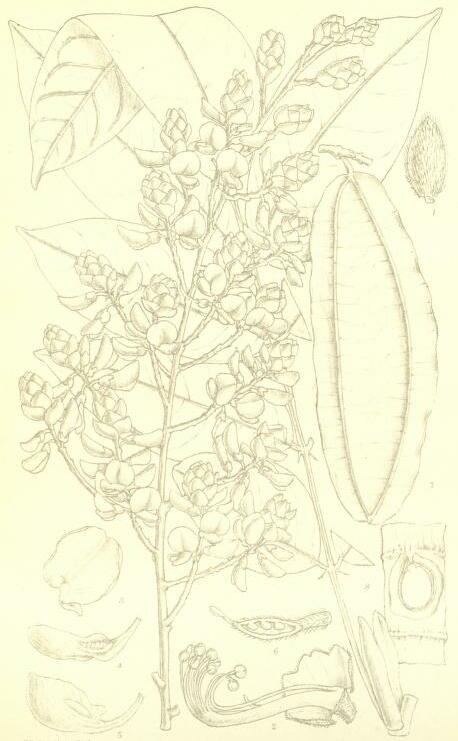

Scientific classification
- Kingdom: Plantae
- Clade: Tracheophytes
- Clade: Angiosperms
- Clade: Eudicots
- Clade: Asterids
- Order: Icacinales
- Family: Icacinaceae
- Genus: Pittosporopsis; Craib

= Pittosporopsis =

Genus of plants

Pittosporopsis is a genus of flowering plants belonging to the family Icacinaceae.

Its native range is Southern Central China to Indo-China.

Species:

- Pittosporopsis kerrii Craib
