= Heterophragma sulfureum =

Conservation status
- Least Concern (IUCN 3.1)

Scientific classification
- Kingdom: Plantae
- Clade: Embryophytes
- Clade: Tracheophytes
- Clade: Angiosperms
- Clade: Eudicots
- Clade: Asterids
- Order: Lamiales
- Family: Bignoniaceae
- Genus: Heterophragma
- Species: H. sulfureum

Binomial name
- Heterophragma sulfureum Kurz

Synonyms
- Haplophragma sulfureum (Kurz) Pichon; Heterophragma vestitum Dop

Species of tree from Southeast Asia

Haplophragma sulfureum is a tree in the Bignoniaceae family, found in four countries of Southeast Asia. The pods are used as tinder, while the wood is used for light construction and traditional medicine.

== Description ==
The species grows as a 8 to 20 m (26 to 66 ft) tall tree. It possesses long "sword-shaped" seed pods. Diameter of the trunk measured at the standard breast height is 10.4 cm for a 6.6m tall specimen. The root system grows some 60 to 70 cm deep. The wood density is some 5.21g cm^{−3}.

The wood anatomy of the tree is consistent with the variety of traits in the Bignoniaceae. In Heterophragma sulfureum the following traits are present: diffuse solitary vessels; parenchyma marking growth rings; simple perforation plates; scanty paratracheal axial parenchyma; parenchyma are 3–4 cells per strand, 2-4-seriate short rays (<1mm), homo-heterocellular with 1 row of upright marginal cells; the vessel-ray pitting is similar to intervessel pits; septate fibres are present; crystals are present in rays.

== Distribution ==
The species is found in the following countries of Southeast Asia: Thailand, Cambodia, Laos, Myanmar.

== Habitat ==
The plant grows within dry deciduous forests, in undergrowth and in savannahs. In the dry deciduous forests of central Cambodia, it is found in the subcanopy.

== Ecology ==
Newinia heterophragmae, a rust fungus in the Phakopsoraceae family is found on the Heterophragma sulfureum in Myanmar.

== Vernacular names ==
Rungrang is a local name used in Thailand. In Cambodia the tree is known as srâom daw krâpë (="crocodile scabbard") or srâ âm, Khmer.

== Uses ==
The long seed-pods are dried and de-seeded before being used as tinder for fire-lighting in Cambodia, and the wood is used to build huts.

The traditional healers gathering plants in the Polsongkram Community Forest, Non Sung District, eastern Thailand, boil the heartwood in water to produce a treatment for diabetes.

== History ==
The species was first described by the German-born botanist, Wilhelm Sulpiz Kurz, (1834–1878). His working life including being director of the Botanical Gardens at Bogor, Jawa, and curator of the Herbarium at then Calcutta, India. He published the description in an 1873 issue of the Journal of the Asiatic Society of Bengal.
