= Diospyros frutescens =

Conservation status
- Least Concern (IUCN 3.1)

Scientific classification
- Kingdom: Plantae
- Clade: Tracheophytes
- Clade: Angiosperms
- Clade: Eudicots
- Clade: Asterids
- Order: Ericales
- Family: Ebenaceae
- Genus: Diospyros
- Species: D. frutescens

Binomial name
- Diospyros frutescens Blume

Synonyms
- Diospyros atra Merr.; Diospyros curtisii King & Gamble; Diospyros cymosa Ridl.; Diospyros frutescens var. kunstleri (King & Gamble) Bakh.; Diospyros globulifera Hiern; Diospyros kuhlii Zoll.; Diospyros kunstleri King & Gamble; Diospyros roi Lecomte; Maba forbesii Hiern

Species of flowering plant

Diospyros frutescens is a tree in the family Ebenaceae. It is native to Southeast Asia.

== Description ==
Diospyros frutescens grows up to 18 m (60 ft) tall. The twigs dry to blackish. The inflorescences bear up to 10 flowers. The fruits are round, up to 20 mm (0.8 in) in diameter.

== Taxonomy ==
Diospyros frutescens was described by the German-Dutch botanist Carl Ludwig Blume in Bijdragen tot de Flora van Nederlandsch Indie in 1826. The type specimen was collected in Java. The specific epithet frutescens means 'shrubby', referring to the tree's growth style.

== Distribution and habitat ==
Diospyros frutescens is native to Thailand and central Malesia. Its habitat is mixed dipterocarp forests from sea level to 800 m (2,600 ft) altitude.

== Conservation ==
Diospyros frutescens has been assessed as least concern on the IUCN Red List. Its population is stable and not currently facing threats. The species is known to be present in a protected area.
