= Potameia =

Scientific classification
- Kingdom: Plantae
- Clade: Tracheophytes
- Clade: Angiosperms
- Clade: Magnoliids
- Order: Laurales
- Family: Lauraceae
- Genus: Potameia; Thouars

Synonyms
- Potamica Poir.

Genus of plants

Potameia is a genus of plant in laurel family (Lauraceae). It contains 23 species, which are native to Madagascar (22 species) or Thailand (1 species).

== Species ==
- Potameia antevaratra Kosterm. - Madagascar
- Potameia argentea Kosterm. - Madagascar
- Potameia capuronii Kosterm. - Madagascar
- Potameia chartacea Kosterm. - Madagascar
- Potameia confluens van der Werff - Madagascar
- Potameia crassifolia Kosterm. - Madagascar
- Potameia eglandulosa Kosterm. - Madagascar
- Potameia elliptica Kosterm. - Madagascar
- Potameia incisa Kosterm. - Madagascar
- Potameia micrantha van der Werff - Madagascar
- Potameia microphylla Kosterm. - Madagascar
- Potameia nitens Kosterm. - Madagascar
- Potameia obtusifolia van der Werff - Madagascar
- Potameia resonjo Kosterm. - Madagascar
- Potameia reticulata Kosterm. - Madagascar
- Potameia rubra Kosterm. - Madagascar
- Potameia salicifolia Kosterm. - Madagascar
- Potameia siamensis Kosterm. - Thailand
- Potameia thouarsiana (Baill.) Capuron - Madagascar
- Potameia thouarsii Roem. & Schult. - Madagascar
- Potameia tomentella van der Werff - Madagascar
- Potameia vacciniifolia Kosterm. - Madagascar
- Potameia velutina Kosterm. - Madagascar
