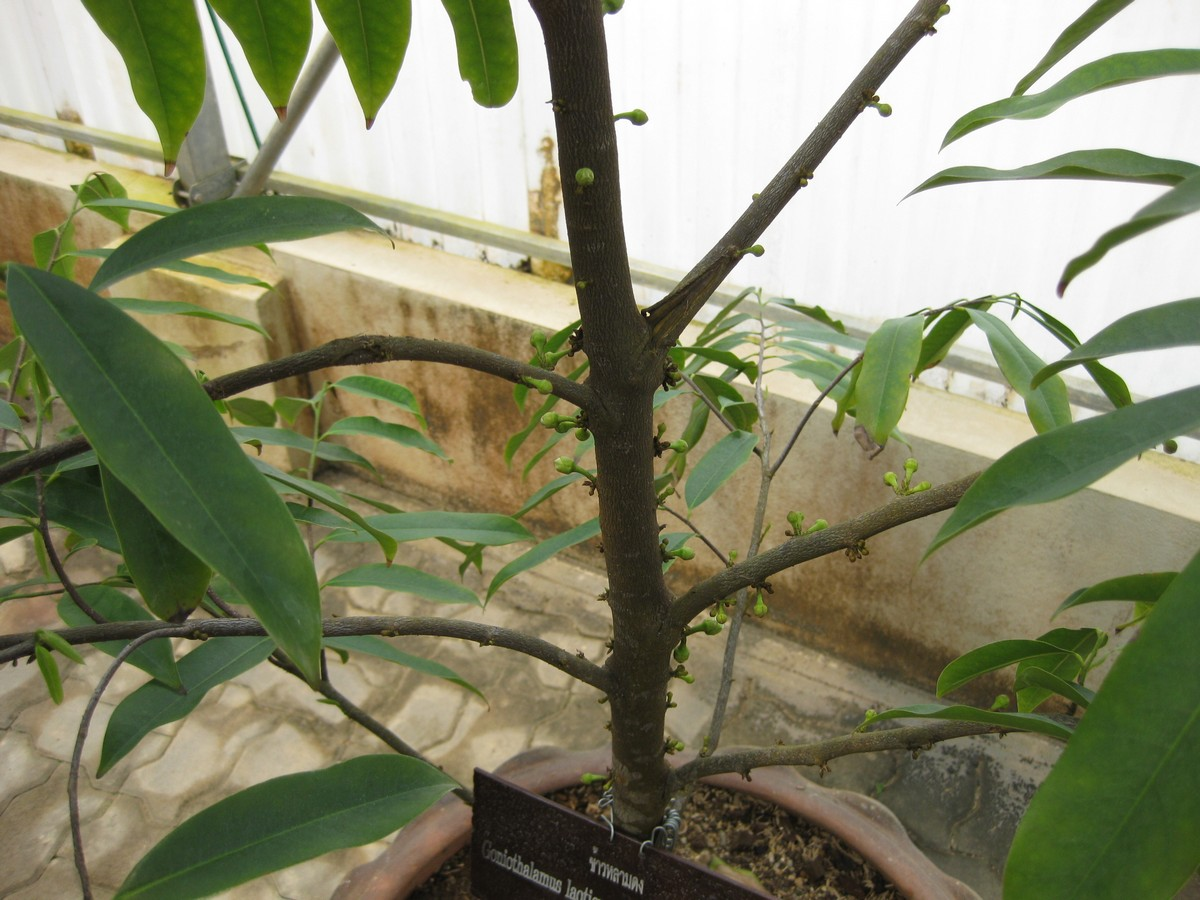
- Photographed at the Queen Sirikit Botanic Garden (Chiang Mai Province, Thailand) in March 2011

Scientific classification
- Kingdom: Plantae
- Clade: Tracheophytes
- Clade: Angiosperms
- Clade: Magnoliids
- Order: Magnoliales
- Family: Annonaceae
- Genus: Goniothalamus
- Species: G. laoticus

Binomial name
- Goniothalamus laoticus (Finet & Gagnep.) Bân

Synonyms
- Mitrephora laotica Finet & Gagnep.

= Goniothalamus laoticus =

Species of plant

Goniothalamus laoticus is a species of plant in the family Annonaceae. It is native to Laos and Thailand. It was originally described by the French botanists Achille Eugène Finet and François Gagnepain using the basionym Mitrephora laotica. In Thailand it is commonly called Khao Lam-dong and is used as a traditional medicine.

== Description ==
It is a tree reaching 4–6 meters in height. Its rigid, smooth, gray to black branches have sparse lenticels. Its oblong, hairless leaves are 18 by 4.5 centimeters and arranged in an alternate phyllotaxy. The base of the leaves are tapered, and their apex terminate in a sharp, stiff point or cusp. Its petioles are 8 millimeters long, hairless and wrinkled on their undersides, with a channel on their upper surface. Its inflorescences have 3-4 flowers. Its peduncles are scaly and covered in fine hairs. Its pedicels are equal in length to its flowers, have bracts at their bases and are covered in brown hairs. Its flowers have 3 oval sepals with bluntly pointed tips. The sepals have fine hairs on their outer surface and their margins but are hairless on their inner surface. Its flowers are 8-9 millimeters long and have 6 petals in two rows of three. The outer petals are narrowly elliptical and hairless on both surfaces. The inner petals are half the length of the outer petals. The margins of the inner petals are connected toward the top, but free at their bases which form a broad claw. Its flowers have 3-4 rows of stamen that essentially lack filaments. Its anthers dehisce longitudinally. The connective tissue between the lobes of the anthers extends above their tops. Its flowers have 10 pistils with smooth carpels, no apparent styles and elongate stigma (botany). Each ovule has 8-10 ovaries.

== Reproductive biology ==
The pollen of G. laoticus is shed as permanent tetrads.

== Uses ==
Bioactive molecules extracted from its flowers have been reported to have antiplasmodial, antimycobacterial and cytotoxic activities.
