= Quercus vestita =

Conservation status
- Data Deficient (IUCN 3.1)

Scientific classification
- Kingdom: Plantae
- Clade: Embryophytes
- Clade: Tracheophytes
- Clade: Angiosperms
- Clade: Eudicots
- Clade: Rosids
- Order: Fagales
- Family: Fagaceae
- Genus: Quercus
- Subgenus: Quercus subg. Cerris
- Section: Quercus sect. Cyclobalanopsis
- Species: Q. vestita

Binomial name
- Quercus vestita Griff.

Species of flowering plant

Quercus vestita is a species of oak. It is a shrub or tree endemic to Assam State in northeastern India. It grows in submontane and montane tropical and subtropical moist forests from 500 to 1,750 metres elevation.

The species was described by William Griffith in 1848.
