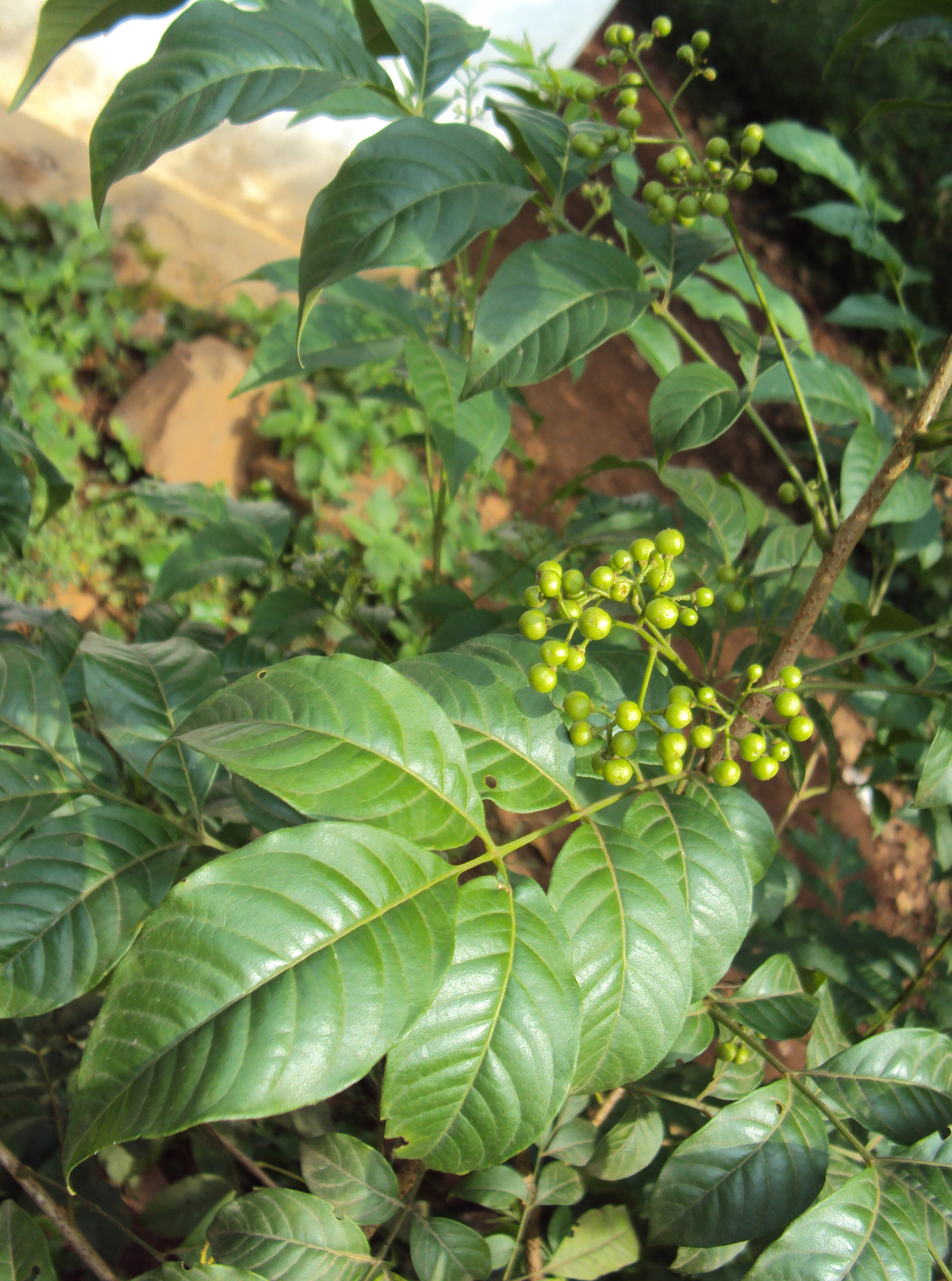

Scientific classification
- Kingdom: Plantae
- Clade: Tracheophytes
- Clade: Angiosperms
- Clade: Eudicots
- Clade: Rosids
- Order: Sapindales
- Family: Meliaceae
- Subfamily: Melioideae
- Genus: Cipadessa; Blume
- Species: C. baccifera

Binomial name
- Cipadessa baccifera (Roth) Miq.

= Cipadessa =

Genus of flowering plants

Cipadessa is a genus of plants belonging to the family Meliaceae. Cipadessa is monotypic, with the single species Cipadessa baccifera. The species is endemic to Western Ghats of India and Sri Lanka. It is a host plant for many moth species.

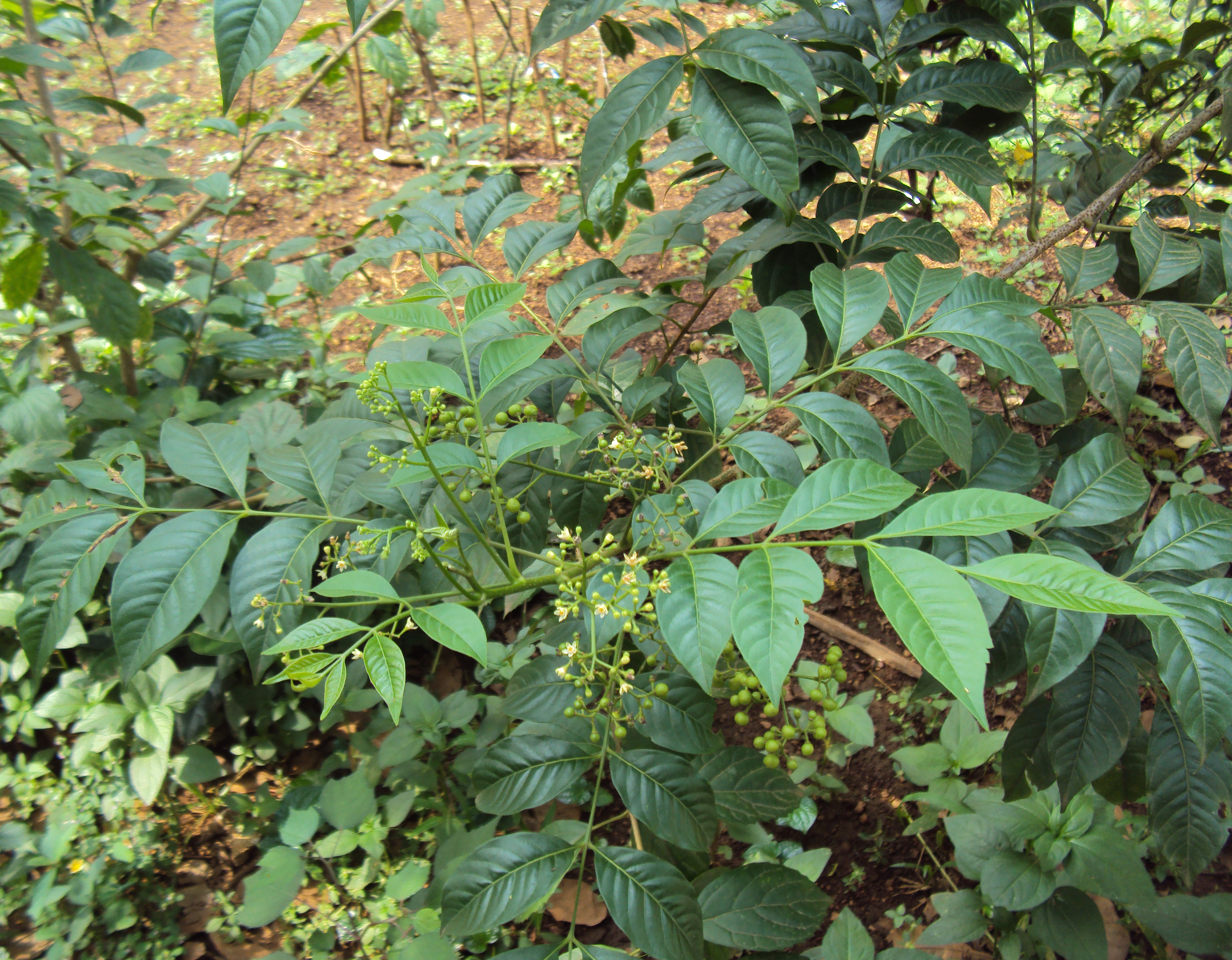
Habitat

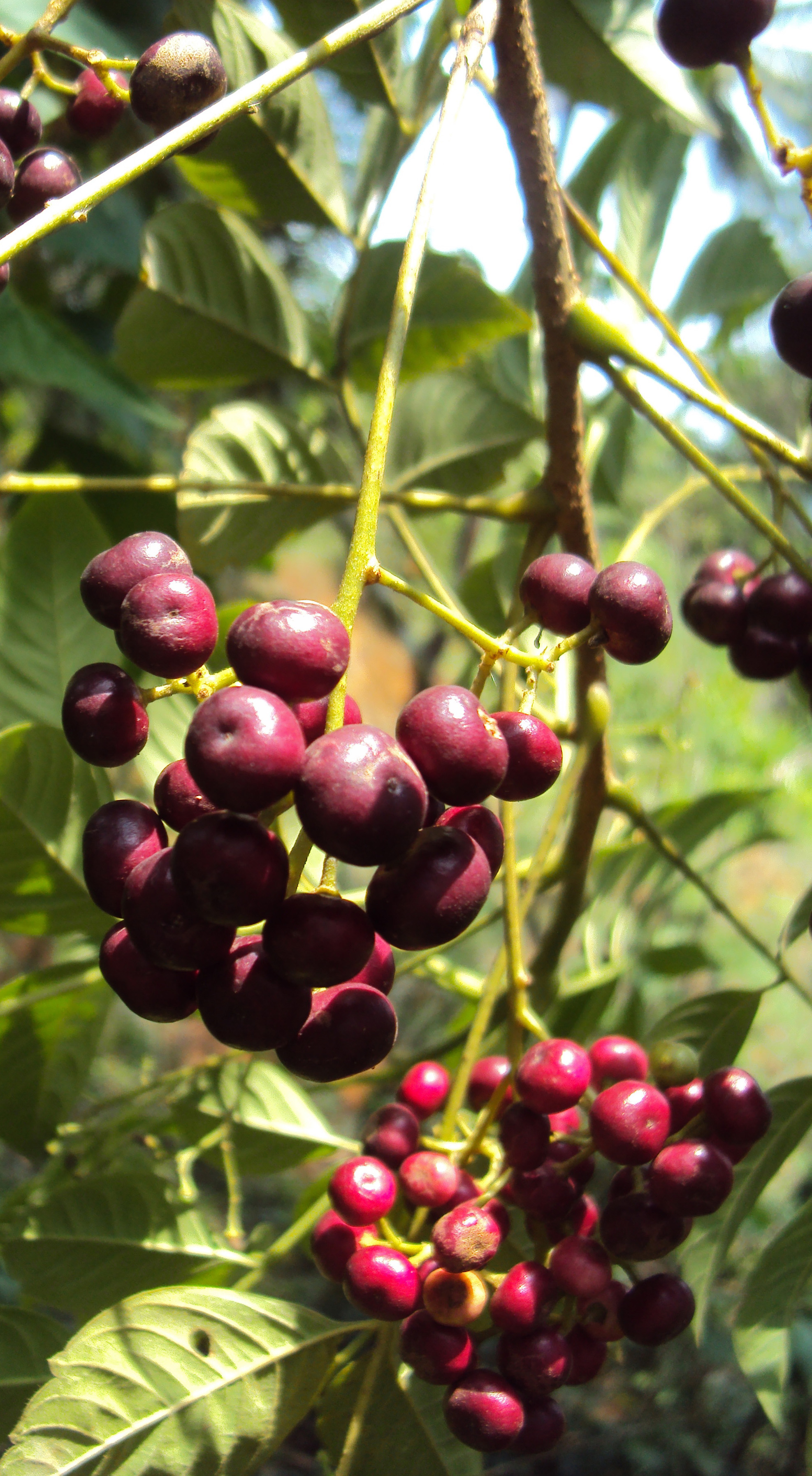
Fruit

== Description ==
It is a small shrub with only 5m tall. Leaves compound, imparipinnate; lamina elliptic, apex acute to acuminate; base acute, cuneate or attenuate with entire margin. Flowers are white colored and show axillary panicles inflorescence. Fruit is a globose drupe with 5 pyrenes.

== Common names ==
- Hindi — Nalbila
- Marathi — Ranabili, Gudmai
- Tamil — Puilipan cheddi, Savattuchedi,
- Malayalam — Kaipanarangi, Potti, Pulippanchedi
- Kannada — Narsullu, Chitunde, Bettada Bevu, Karbe, Sidigolii, Chitunde, Adusoge
- Urdu — Ranabili
- Sinhala — Halbemiya (හල්බැමිය)
