= Quercus lineata =

Conservation status
- Least Concern (IUCN 3.1)

Scientific classification
- Kingdom: Plantae
- Clade: Embryophytes
- Clade: Tracheophytes
- Clade: Spermatophytes
- Clade: Angiosperms
- Clade: Eudicots
- Clade: Rosids
- Order: Fagales
- Family: Fagaceae
- Genus: Quercus
- Subgenus: Quercus subg. Cerris
- Section: Quercus sect. Cyclobalanopsis
- Species: Q. lineata

Binomial name
- Quercus lineata Blume

Synonyms
- Cyclobalanopsis chapensis (Hickel & A.Camus) Y.C.Hsu & H.Wei Jen; Cyclobalanopsis kamroopii (D.Don) Oerst.; Cyclobalanopsis koumeii Hu; Cyclobalanopsis lineata (Blume) Oerst.; Cyclobalanopsis shiangpyungensis Hu; Quercus chapensis Hickel & A.Camus; Quercus hendersoniana A.Camus; Quercus hildebrandii (Hook.f.) A.Camus; Quercus oxyrhyncha Miq.; Quercus polyneura Miq.

Species of plant

Quercus lineata is a species of Quercus (oak) in the beech family Fagaceae, belonging to subgenus Cerris, section Cyclobalanopsis. It was first described by Carl Ludwig von Blume.

== Range and habitat ==
Quercus lineata is native from Assam and Bangladesh through Indochina to Hainan, Borneo, Peninsular Malaysia, Sumatra, and Java.

Quercus lineata is native to humid montane forests between 500 and 2,200 metres elevation. It is typically found on sandy or basic soils.

== Varieties ==
According to Tropicos a number of varieties exist, including:

- Quercus lineata var. fargesii (Franch.) Skan
- Quercus lineata var. grandifolia Skan
- Quercus lineata var. heterochroa Miq.
- Quercus lineata var. hilldebrandii Hook.f.
- Quercus lineata var. lobbii Hook.f. & Thomson ex Wenz.
- Quercus lineata var. macrophylla Seemen
- Quercus lineata var. merkusii (Endl.) Wenz.
- Quercus lineata var. oxyodon (Miq.) Wenz.
- Quercus lineata var. oxyrhyncha (Miq.) Seem.
- Quercus lineata var. thomsoniana (A.DC.) Wenz.

== Taxonomy ==
Quercus lineata was initially described by Blume and published in Bijdragen tot de flora van Nederlandsch Indië (tr. Contributions to the flora of the Dutch East Indies) 10: 523–524. 1825.
