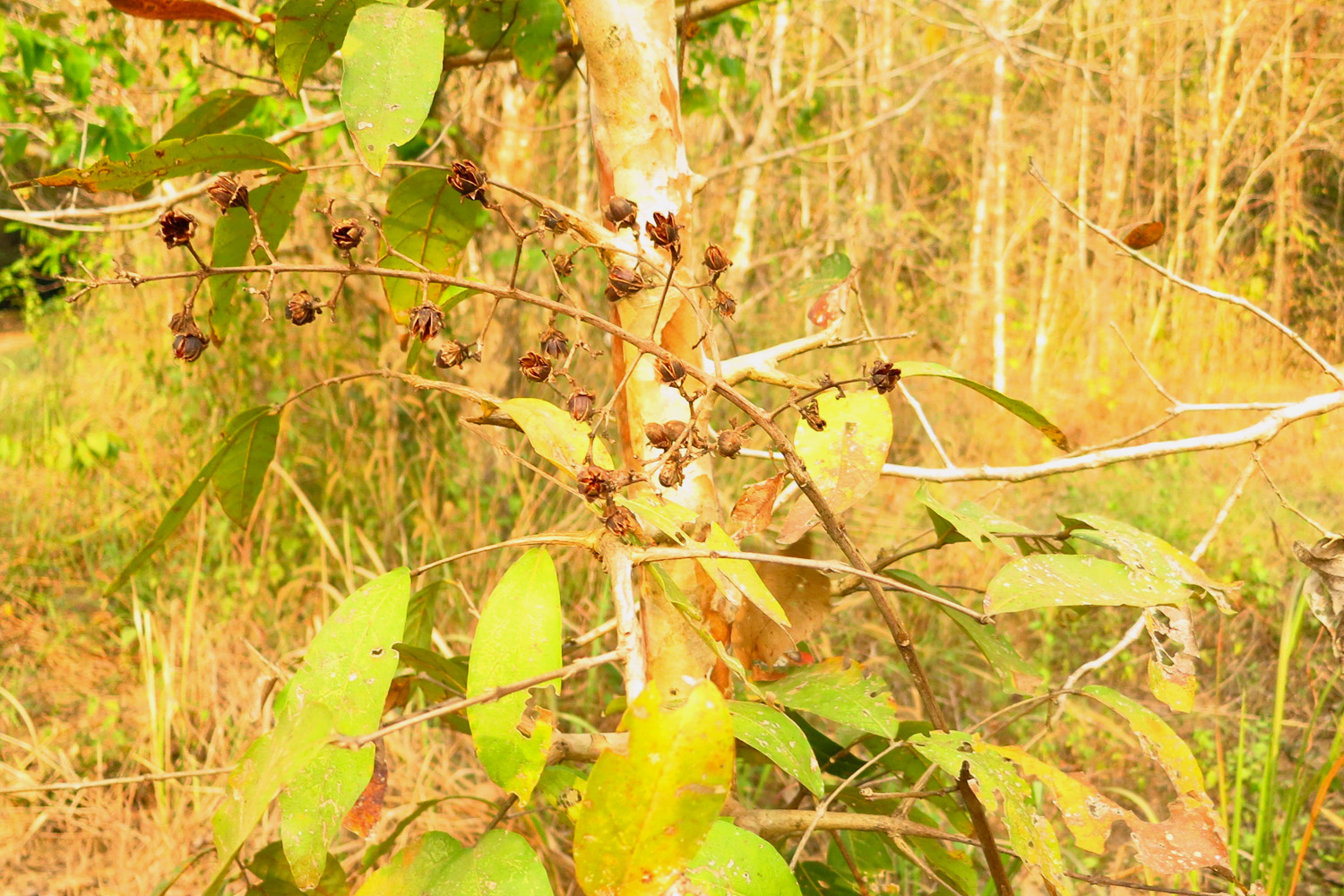
- Dehiscent seed capsules, leaves and trunk: Cat Tien National Park specimen
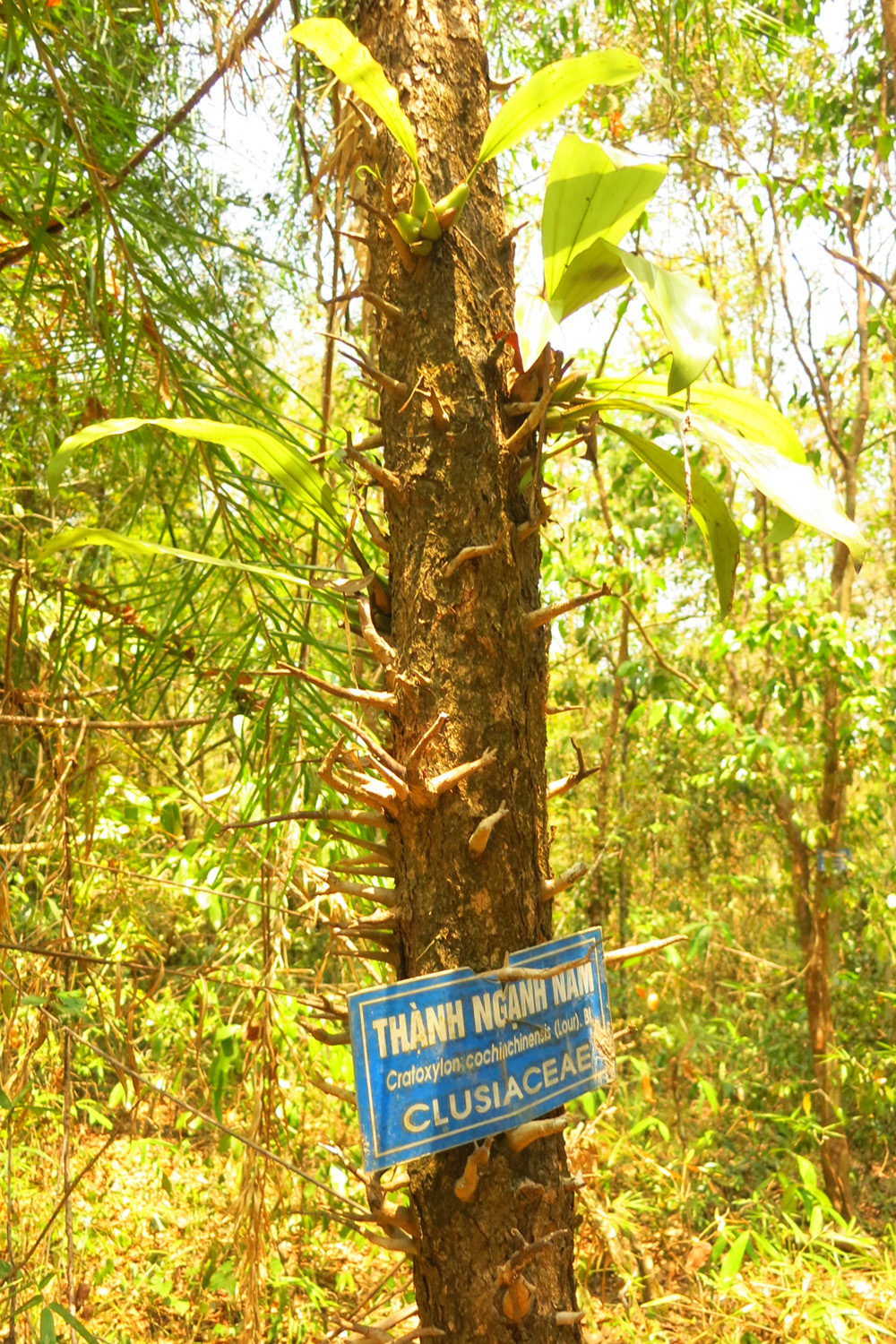
- Characteristic trunk of young tree (with epiphytic orchids)

Conservation status
- Least Concern (IUCN 3.1)

Scientific classification
- Kingdom: Plantae
- Clade: Tracheophytes
- Clade: Angiosperms
- Clade: Eudicots
- Clade: Rosids
- Order: Malpighiales
- Family: Hypericaceae
- Genus: Cratoxylum
- Species: C. cochinchinense

Binomial name
- Cratoxylum cochinchinense (Lour.) Blume

Synonyms
- List: Hypericum cochinchinense Lour.; Vismia cochinchinensis (Lour.) Spreng.; Stalagmitis erosipetala Miq.; Ancistrolobus brevipes Turcz.; Ancistrolobus ligustrinus Spach; Cratoxylum biflorum (Lam.) Turcz.; Cratoxylum carneum Kurz; Cratoxylum chinense (Hance) Merr.; Cratoxylum hypoleucum Elmer; Cratoxylum lanceolatum Miq.; Cratoxylum ligustrinum (Spach) Blume; Cratoxylum myrtifolium Blume; Cratoxylum petiolatum Blume; Cratoxylum polyanthum Korth.; Cratoxylum polyanthum var. ligustrinum Blume; Cratoxylum polyanthum var. macrocarpum Boerl.; Cratoxylum wightii Blume; Elodes chinensis Hance; Elodes pulchella Loudon; Hypericum biflorum Lam.; Hypericum carneum Wall.; Hypericum chinense Retz.; Hypericum horridum Wall.; Hypericum loureiroi K.Koch; Hypericum petiolatum Lour.; Hypericum pulchellum Willd.

= Cratoxylum cochinchinense =

Species of flowering plant

Cratoxylum cochinchinense is a species of flowering plant in the family Hypericaceae. It is sometimes referred to using an orthographic variant Cratoxylon cochinsinensis (Lour.) Blume in Vietnam, where the species was described. The specific epithet cochinchinense is from the Latin meaning "of Cochinchina". In Vietnamese, C. cochinchinense is usually called thành ngạch nam or lành ngạnh nam, other names include: hoàng ngưu mộc, hoàng ngưu trà and đỏ ngọn.

In Malesia, the trees are cut for derum timber.

== Description ==
Cratoxylum cochinchinense grows as a shrub or tree, typically measuring 10-15 metres (49 ft) tall with a diameter of up to 0.65 metres (2 ft 2 in). The brown bark is smooth to flaky, with characteristic lateral pegs which are the remnants of previous leaf clusters (see illustration); leaf undersides are glaucous. The flowers are crimson red, which develop into seed capsules measuring up to 12 mm (0.5 in) long.

== Distribution and habitat ==
Cratoxylum cochinchinense is native to the Andaman Islands, Borneo, Cambodia, South-Central and Southeast China, Laos, Malaysia, Myanmar, the Nicobar Islands, the Philippines, Sumatera, Thailand, and Vietnam. Its habitat is sub-tropical and tropical forests, including kerangas forests and peat swamps.

== Gallery ==
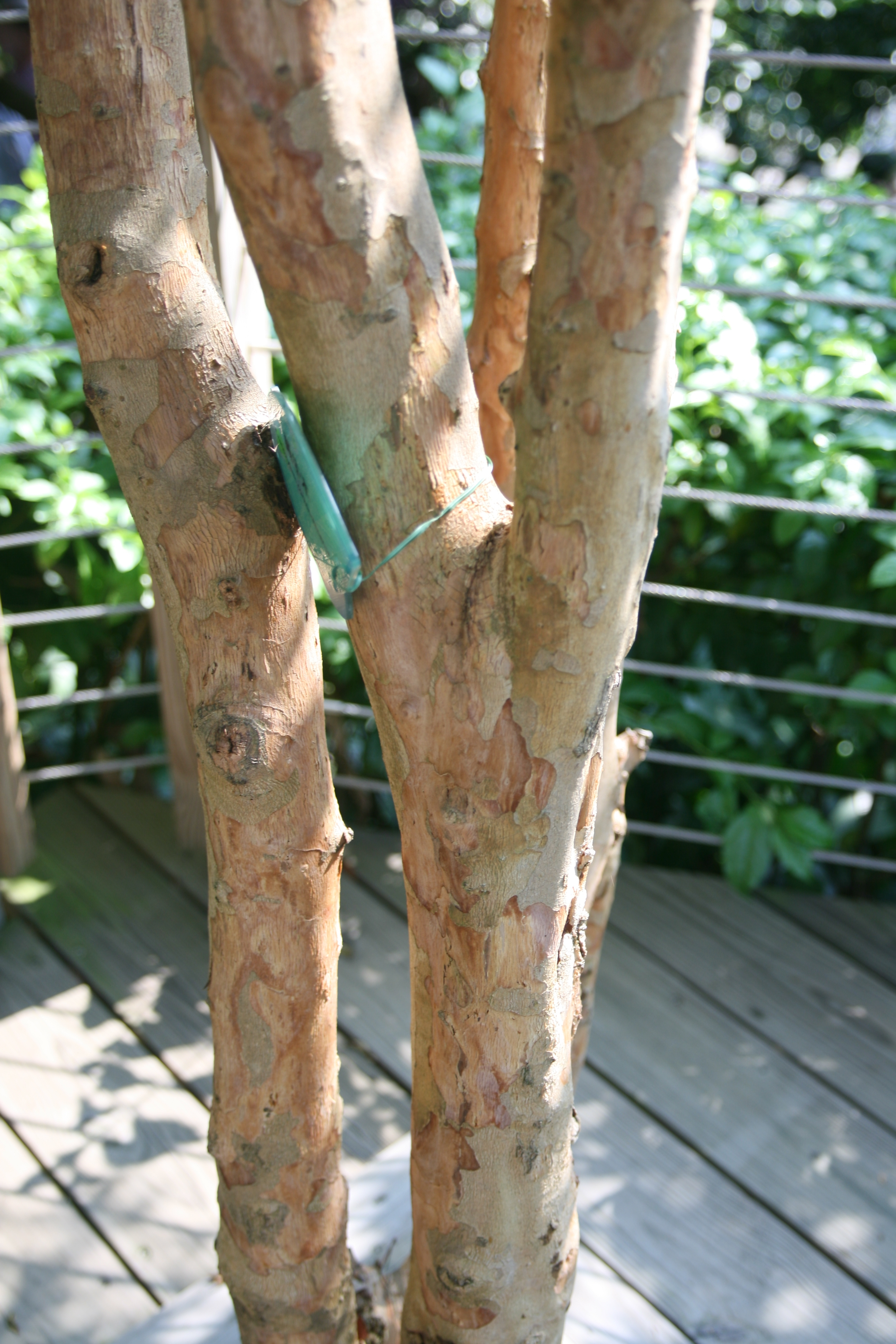
