= Quercus semiserrata =

Conservation status
- Least Concern (IUCN 3.1)

Scientific classification
- Kingdom: Plantae
- Clade: Embryophytes
- Clade: Tracheophytes
- Clade: Spermatophytes
- Clade: Angiosperms
- Clade: Eudicots
- Clade: Rosids
- Order: Fagales
- Family: Fagaceae
- Genus: Quercus
- Subgenus: Quercus subg. Cerris
- Section: Quercus sect. Cyclobalanopsis
- Species: Q. semiserrata

Binomial name
- Quercus semiserrata Roxb.

Varieties
- Quercus semiserrata var. mannii Hook.f.; Quercus semiserrata var. semiserrata

Synonyms
- Cyclobalanopsis semiserrata (Roxb.) Oerst.; synonym of var. annulata: Quercus annulata Hook.f. ex A.DC.

Species of tree

Quercus semiserrata is an Asian species of trees in the beech family Fagaceae. It has been found in northeastern India, Bangladesh, Myanmar, Thailand, Yunnan, and Tibet, as well as Vietnam, Cambodia, Peninsular Malaysia, and Sumatra. This species is a component of tropical wet foothill forests in northern Myanmar and can also be found in montane forests, often at elevations of 1200 – 1600 meters above sea level. It is placed in subgenus Cerris, section Cyclobalanopsis.

Quercus semiserrata is a small tree up to 10 meters tall. Leaves can be as much as 7 cm long, thin and papery.
