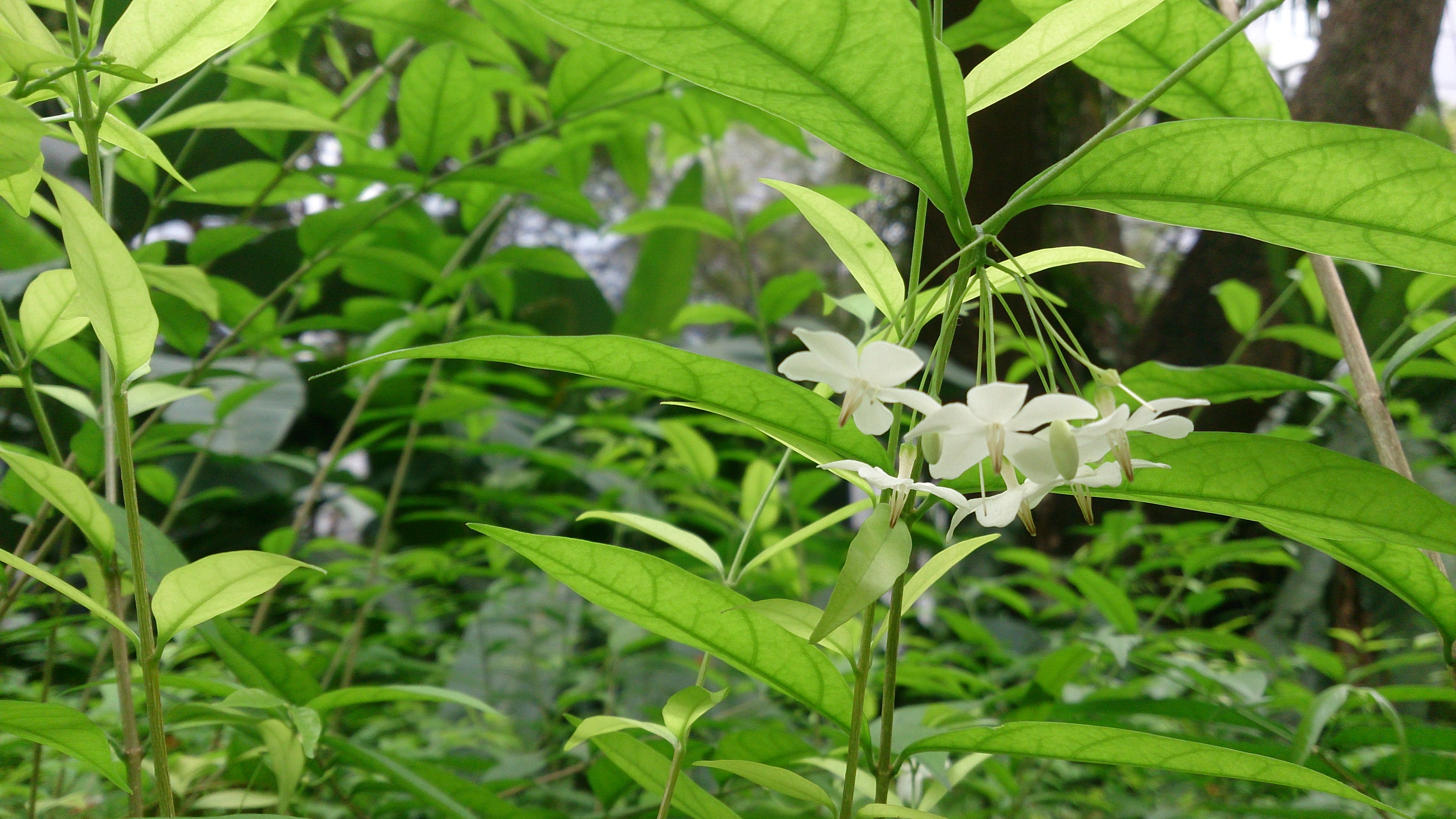

Scientific classification
- Kingdom: Plantae
- Clade: Tracheophytes
- Clade: Angiosperms
- Clade: Eudicots
- Clade: Asterids
- Order: Gentianales
- Family: Apocynaceae
- Genus: Wrightia
- Species: W. religiosa

Binomial name
- Wrightia religiosa (Teijsm. & Binn.) Hook. f., 1882

Synonyms
- Echites religiosus Teijsm. & Binnendijk; Wrightia religiosa (Teijsm. & Binn.) Benth.

= Wrightia religiosa =

Species of tree

Wrightia religiosa is a species of tree in the family Apocynaceae. Its distribution includes: China (Guangdong), Indochina and Malaysia including the Philippines; no subspecies are listed in the Catalogue of Life.

This species is commonly a bonsai plant, used in pagodas of Indo-China and elsewhere. In Viet Nam, it may be called: Mai chiếu thủy, mai chấn thủy, mai trúc thủy, or lòng mức miên; in English, it has sometimes been translated as water jasmine. It produces small, pendulous white flowers that have a fragrance similar to true jasmine.

== Gallery ==
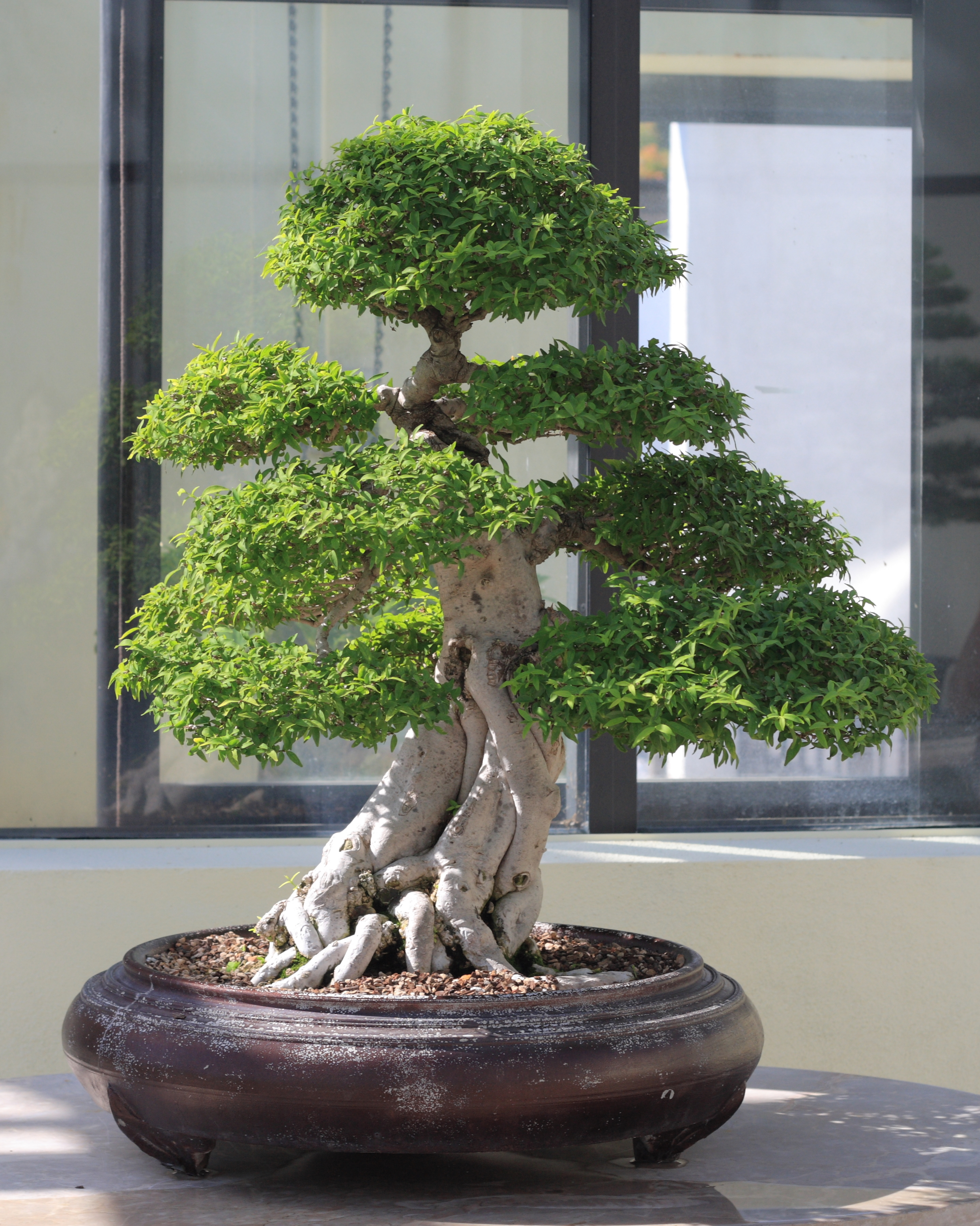

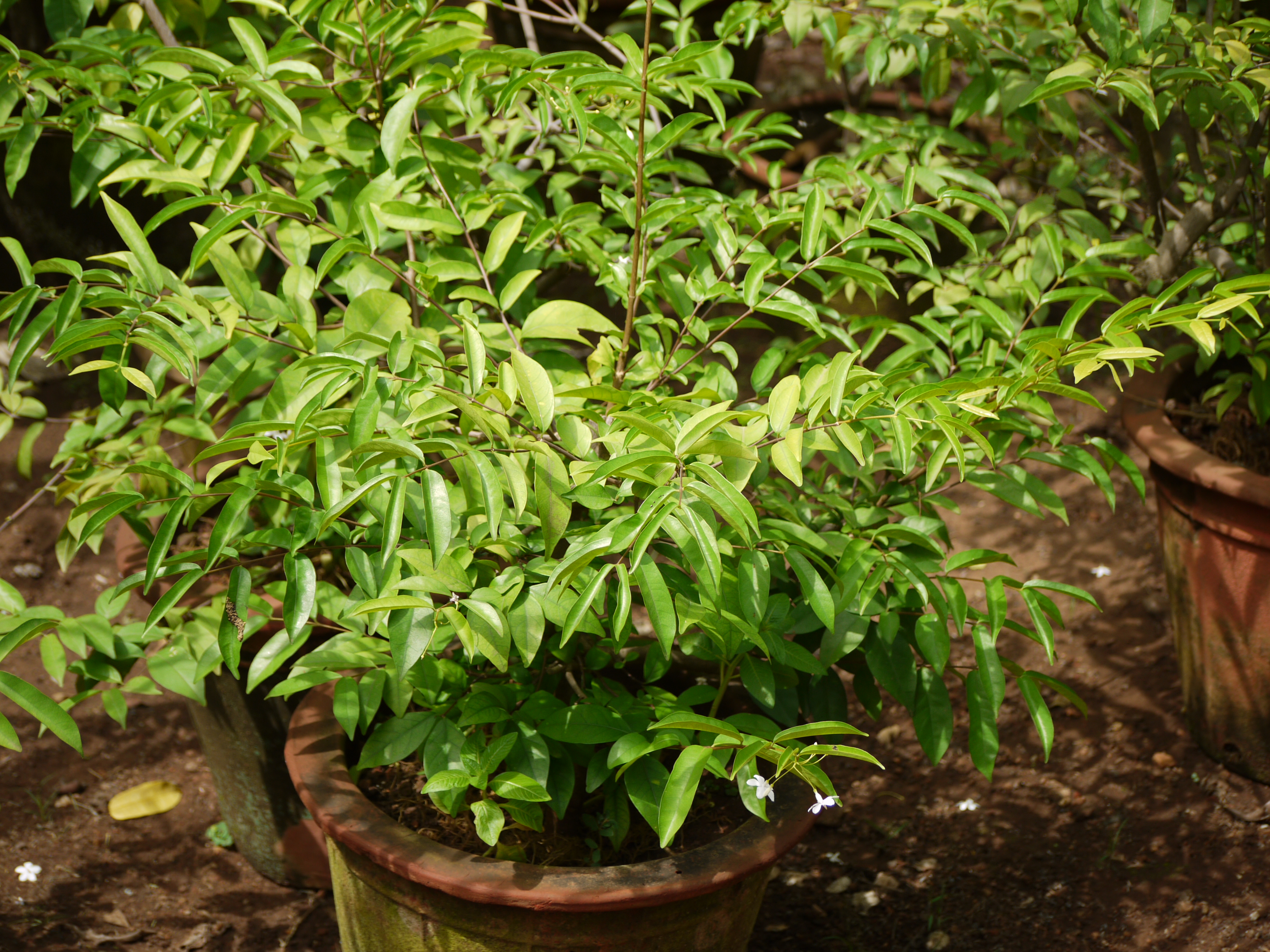

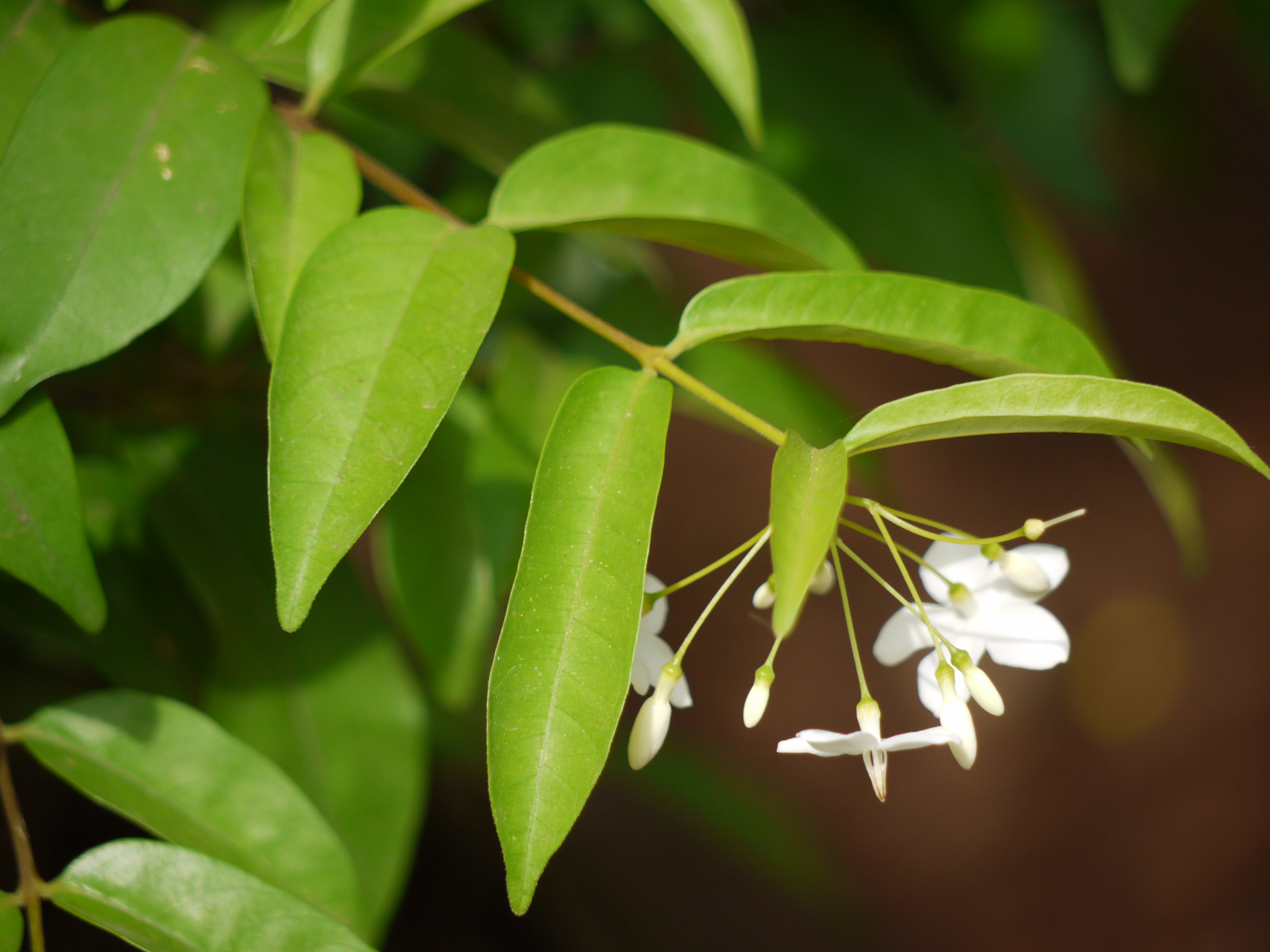

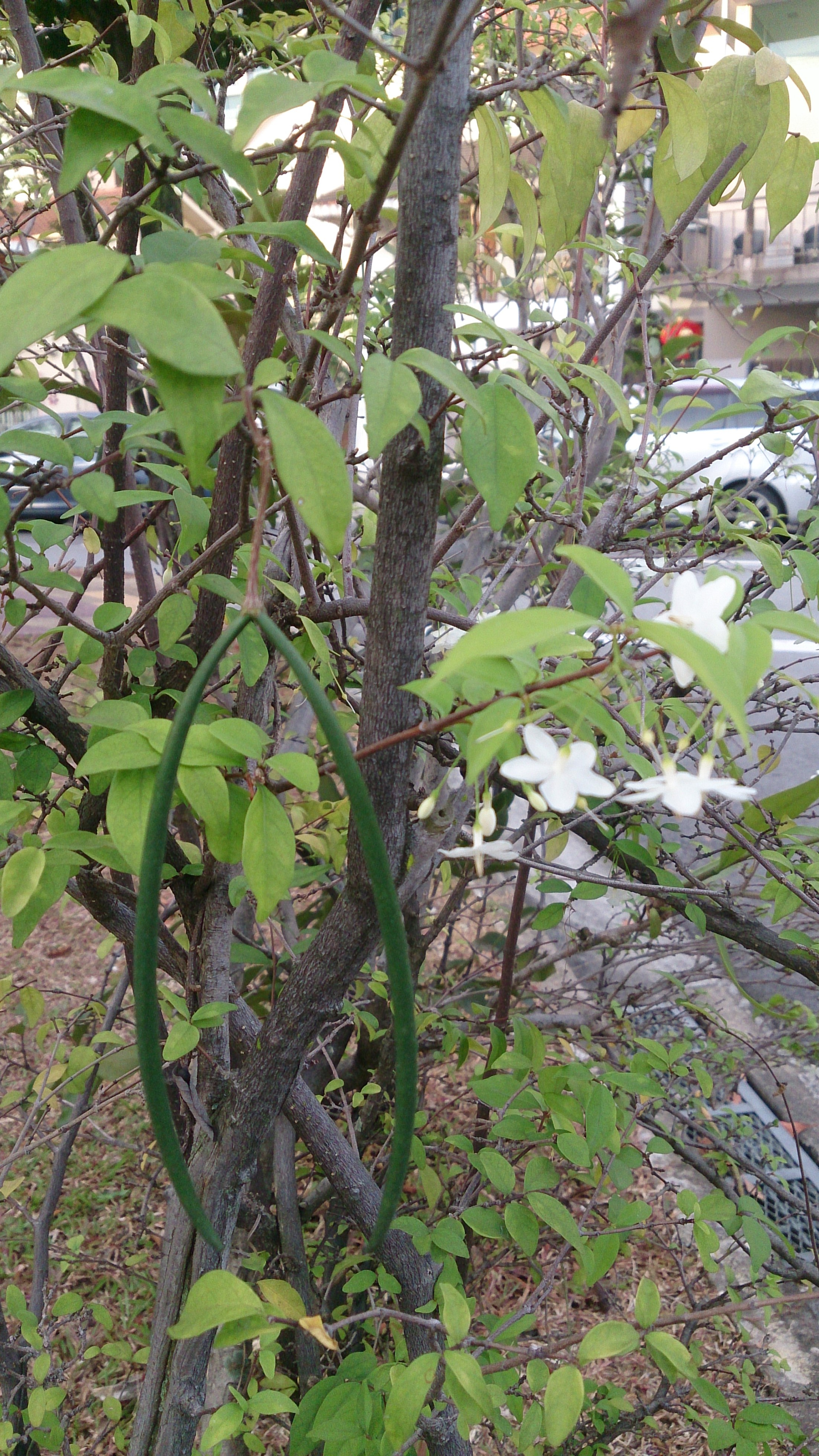
