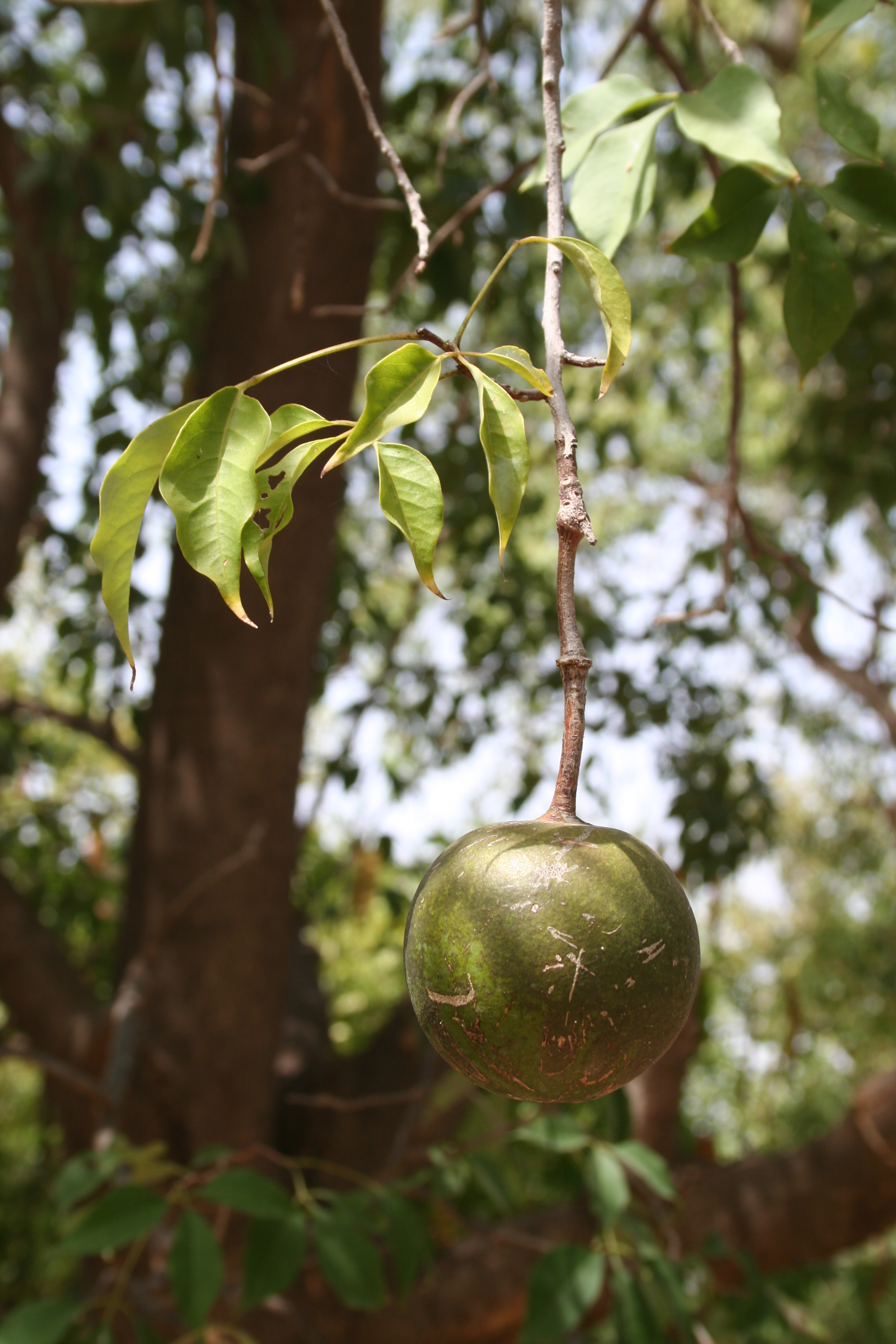

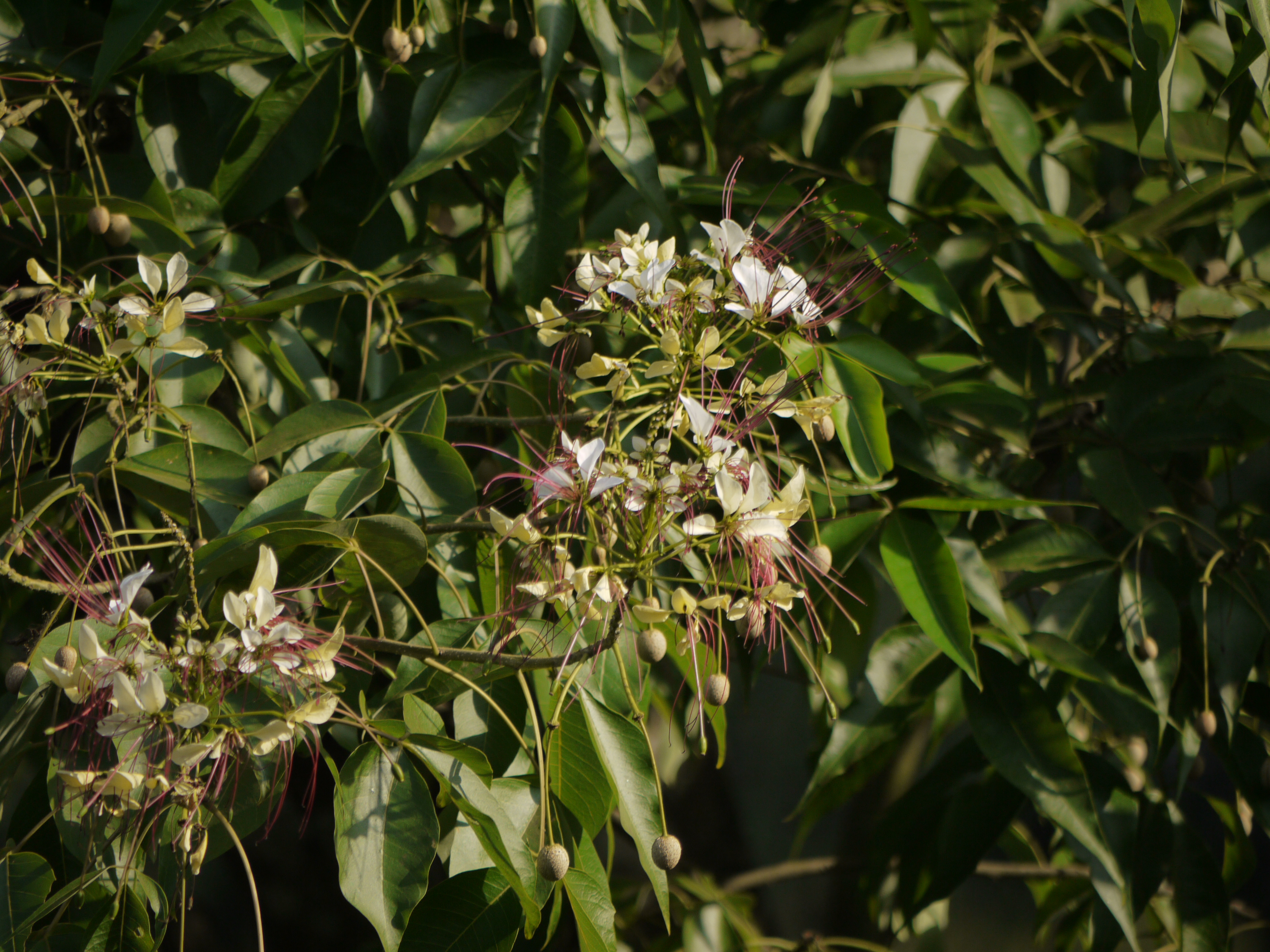

Scientific classification
- Kingdom: Plantae
- Clade: Tracheophytes
- Clade: Angiosperms
- Clade: Eudicots
- Clade: Rosids
- Order: Brassicales
- Family: Capparaceae
- Genus: Crateva
- Species: C. adansonii

Binomial name
- Crateva adansonii DC., 1824

= Crateva adansonii =

Species of plant

Crateva adansonii is a species of small tree in the family Capparaceae. It is widely distributed in Africa and Asia and may be called the "sacred barna" in India or bún trái đỏ (mắt núi) in Vietnam.

== Subspecies ==
The Catalogue of Life lists:

- C. adansonii adansonii (Africa)
- C. adansonii f. axillaris (southern India, Sri Lanka, Malesia)
- C. adansonii odora (India, Indo-China)

== Gallery ==
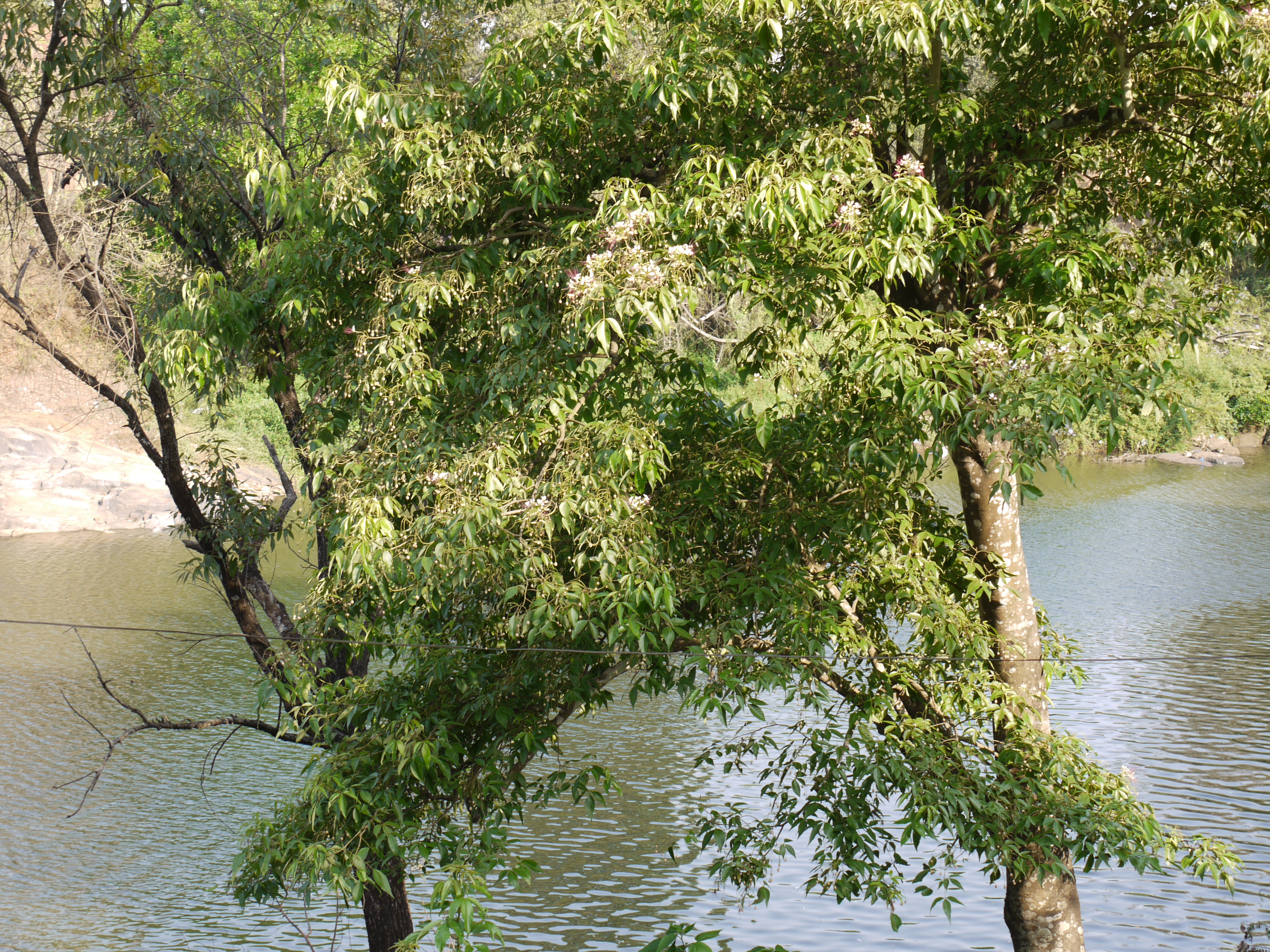

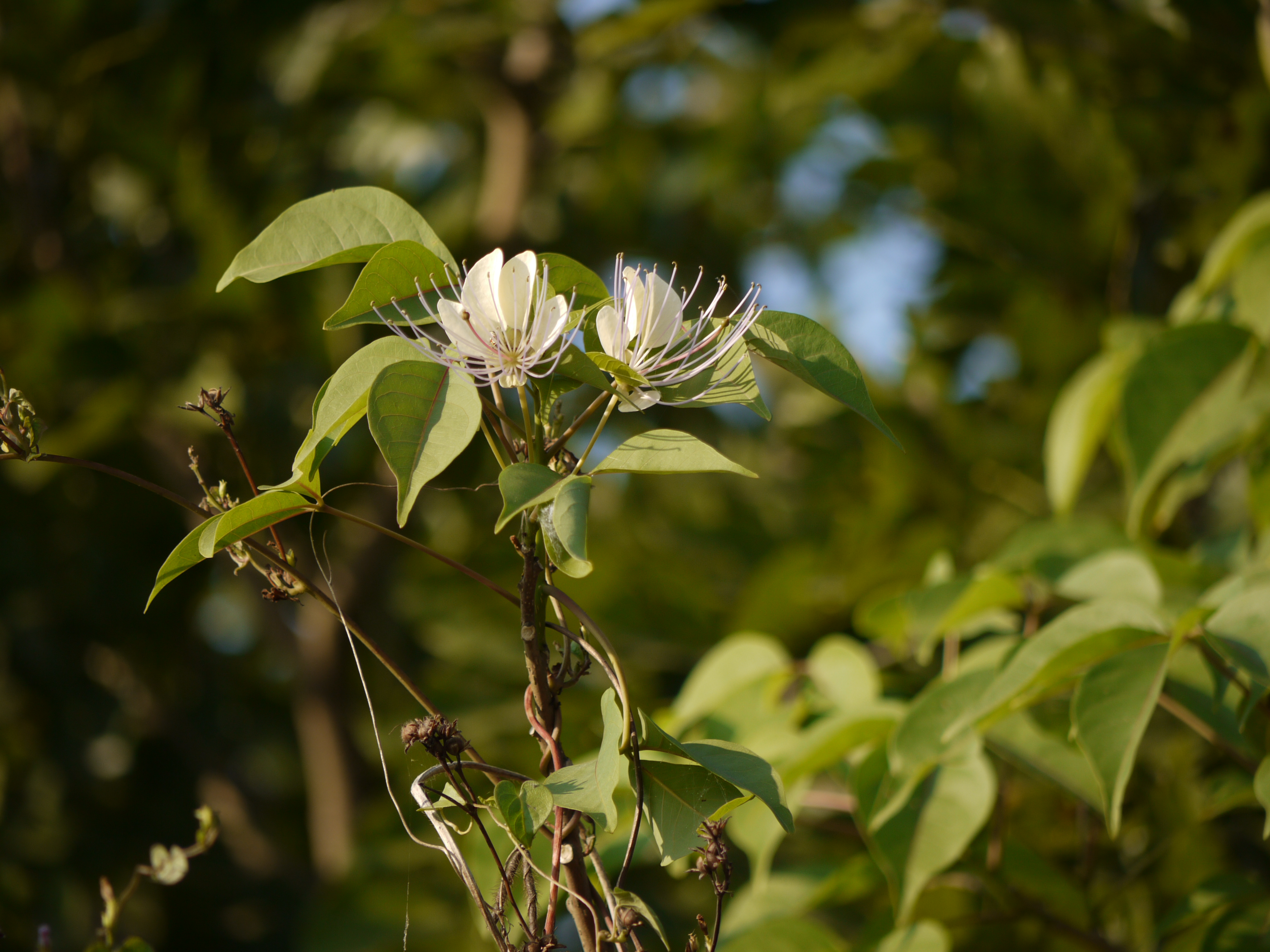
C. adansonii odora, Thane, India

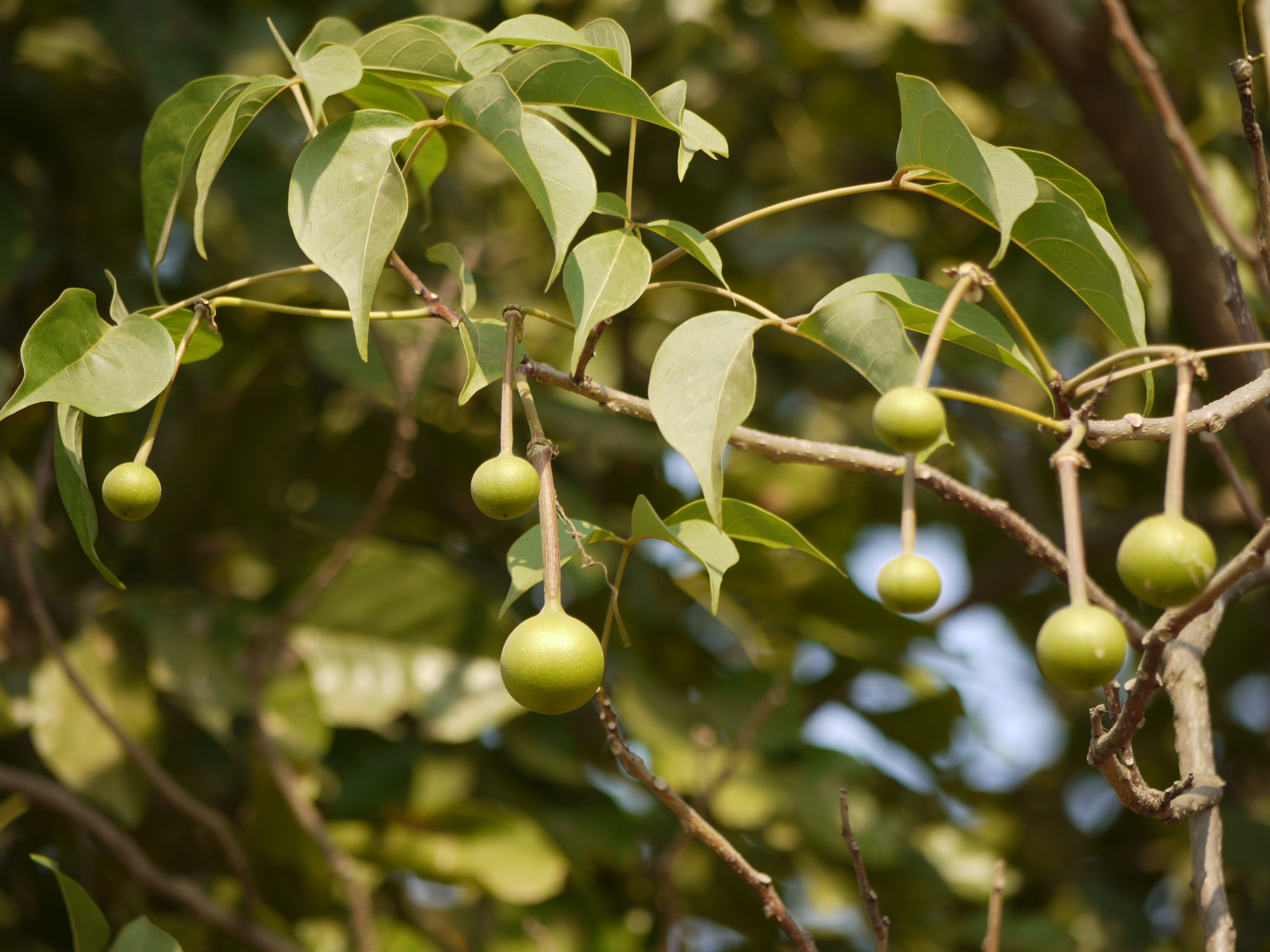

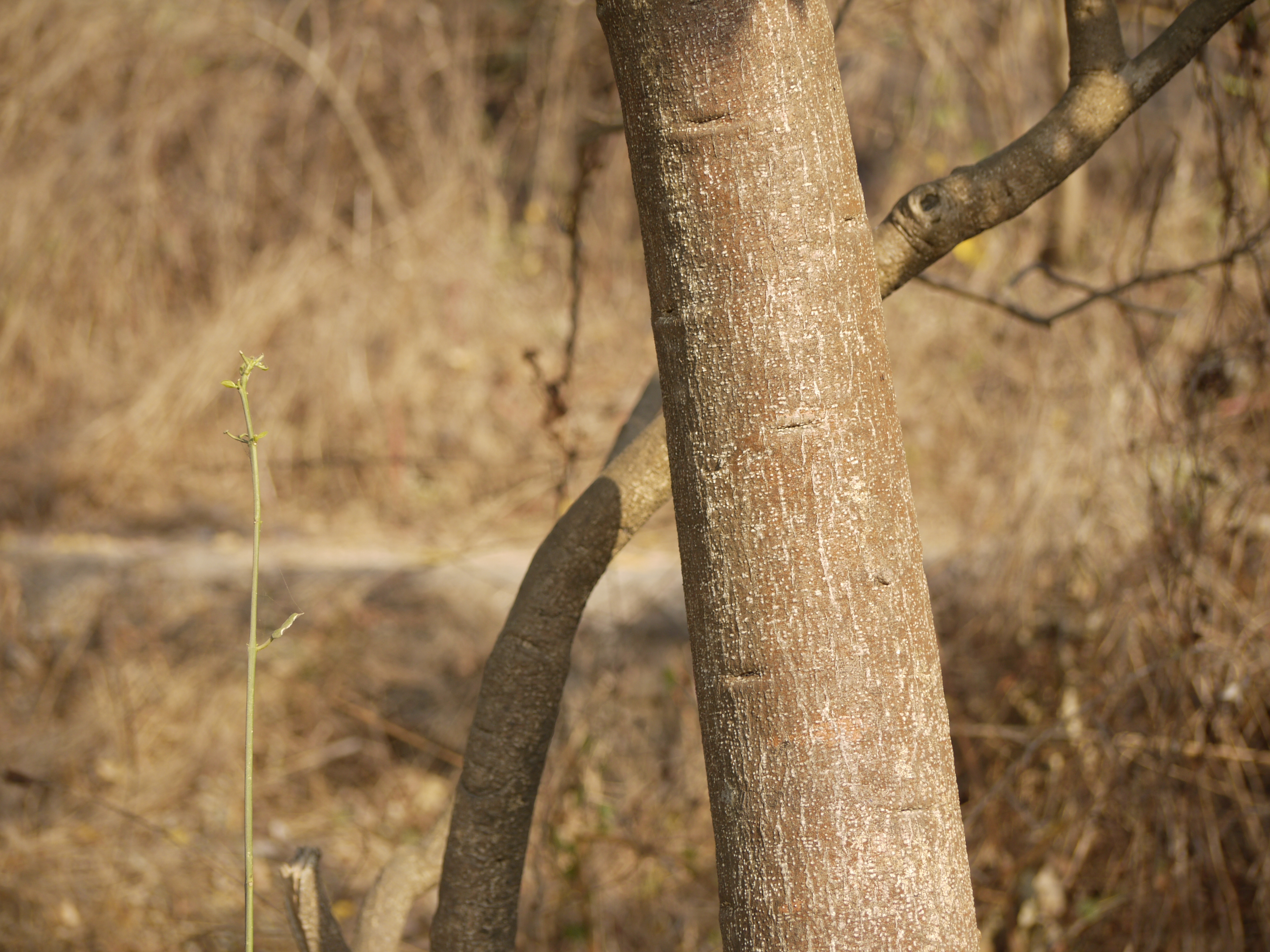
