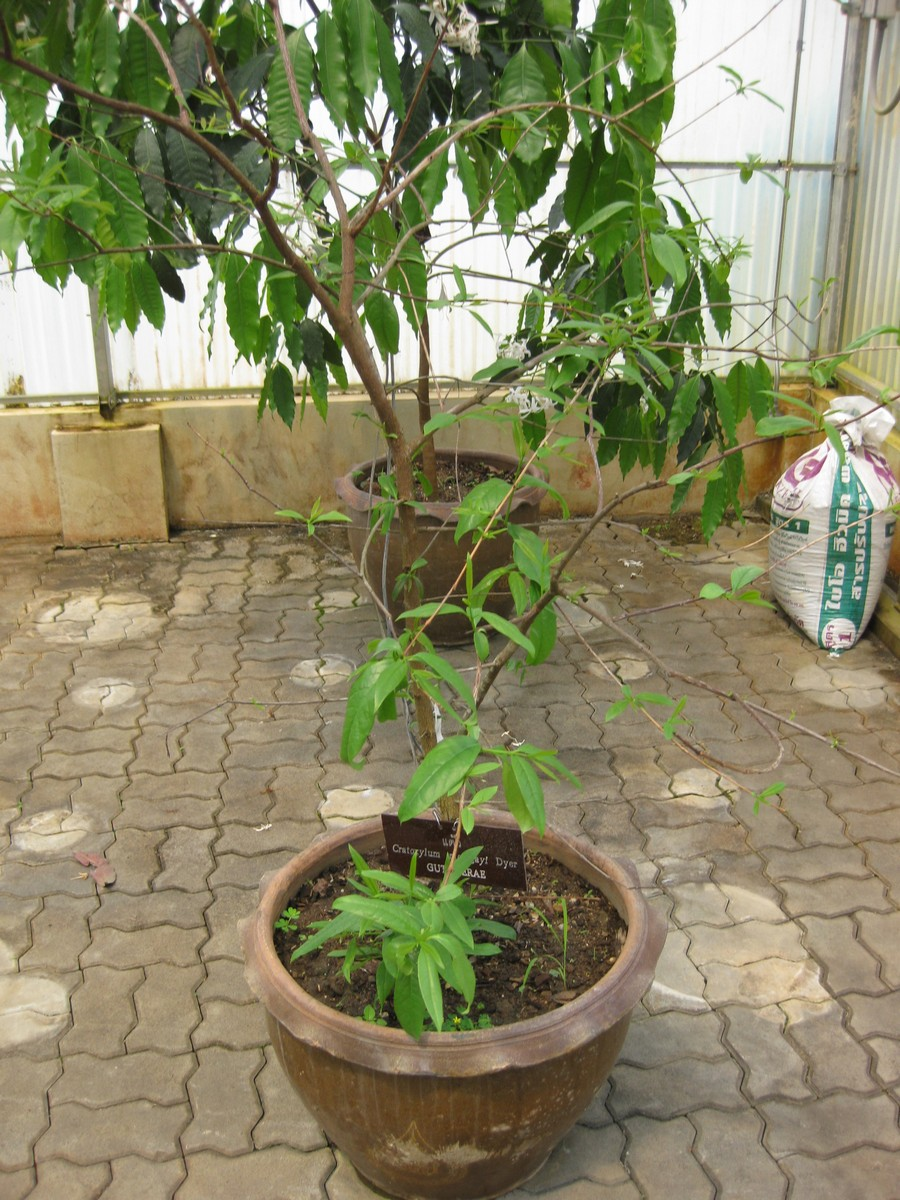

Conservation status
- Least Concern (IUCN 3.1)

Scientific classification
- Kingdom: Plantae
- Clade: Tracheophytes
- Clade: Angiosperms
- Clade: Eudicots
- Clade: Rosids
- Order: Malpighiales
- Family: Hypericaceae
- Genus: Cratoxylum
- Species: C. maingayi

Binomial name
- Cratoxylum maingayi Dyer

Synonyms
- Cratoxylum harmandii Pierre; Cratoxylum formosum var. thorelii Pierre ex Gagnep.; Cratoxylum acuminatum Merr.; Cratoxylum cochinchinense var. calcareum Ridl.; Cratoxylum parvifolium Merr.; Cratoxylum subglaucum Merr.; Cratoxylum thorelii Pierre ex Gagnep.

= Cratoxylum maingayi =

Species of flowering plant

Cratoxylum maingayi is a flowering tree in the family Hypericaceae. The species is harvested for derum timber for limited local use.

== Description ==
Cratoxylum maingayi grows as a shrub or tree measuring up to 10 metres (30 ft) tall with a diameter of up to 10 centimetres (4 in). The brown bark is smooth to fissured. The leaves are opposite and have leaf stalks. The leaf blades are leathery in texture and a wide oval shape with a pointed tip. The flowers are pale pink. The fruits measure up to 1.5 cm (0.6 in) long.

== Taxonomy ==
Cratoxylum maingayi was described by British botanist William Turner Thiselton-Dyer in 1874. It is named for the botanist Alexander Carroll Maingay.

== Distribution and habitat ==
Cratoxylum maingayi grows naturally in Indochina, Sumatra, Peninsular Malaysia and Borneo. Its habitat is lowland forests.
