= Syzygium ripicola =

Scientific classification
- Kingdom: Plantae
- Clade: Tracheophytes
- Clade: Angiosperms
- Clade: Eudicots
- Clade: Rosids
- Order: Myrtales
- Family: Myrtaceae
- Genus: Syzygium
- Species: S. ripicola

Binomial name
- Syzygium ripicola (Craib) Merr. & L.M.Perry

Synonyms
- Syzygium cochinchinense (Gagnep.) Merr. & L.M.Perry; Syzygium eburneum (Gagnep.) Merr. & L.M.Perry; Eugenia ripicola Craib; Eugenia cochinchinensis Gagnep.

Species of plants

Syzygium ripicola is a species of small tree in the "water apple / wax apple" genus Syzygium of the family Myrtaceae. Vietnamese names (including synonyms) may be trâm suối, trâm nước (or for synonym S. cochinchinense: trâm nam bộ) and it is found especially in Đồng Nai province; no subspecies are listed in Plants of the World Online.

As its scientific and Vietnamese names suggest, this species is often associated with riparian areas. This is a small tree with red fruit, often branched in groups of three, 10–13 mm long.
