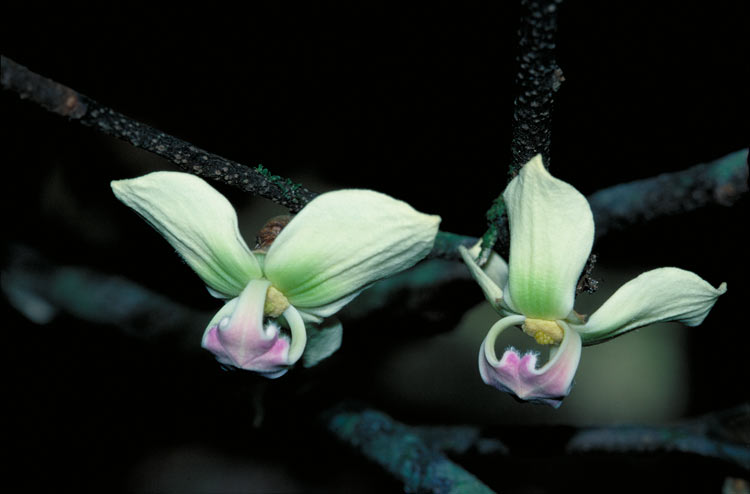
- Flower of Mitrephora diversifolia

Scientific classification
- Kingdom: Plantae
- Clade: Tracheophytes
- Clade: Angiosperms
- Clade: Magnoliids
- Order: Magnoliales
- Family: Annonaceae
- Tribe: Miliuseae
- Genus: Mitrephora (Blume) Hook.f. & Thomson

Species
- See text

Synonyms
- Kinginda Kuntze

= Mitrephora =

Genus of plants in the soursop family

Mitrephora is a genus of flowering plants in the family Annonaceae, that are native to an area that extends from China in the north to Queensland. Plants in the genus Mitrephora are also found in southern India (Karnataka, Kerala and Tamil Nadu) and Southeast Asia.

== Description ==
Plants in the genus Mitrephora are trees or shrubs, the young shoots covered with reddish-brown hairs. The flowers are bisexual, usually arranged singly or in small groups in leaf axils. The sepals are valvate and fused at the base. The petals are valvate, the outer petals broad, flat and spreading, the inner petals with a broadly egg-shaped or spade-shaped blade with a long, narrow hinge at the base. The edges of the blades are fused. The stamens are wedge-shaped and the anthers are hidden. There are usually many carpels containing several ovules, and the stigma is more or less sessile. The fruit is fleshy, more or less spherical and yellow, containing several seeds.

== Taxonomy ==
The genus Mitrephora was first formally described in 1830 by Carl Ludwig Blume who gave it the name Uvaria sect. Mitrephorae in his Flora Javae nec non insularum adjacentium. In 1855, Joseph Dalton Hooker and Thomas Thomson raised the genus Mitrephora in their book Flora Indica. The genus name (Mitrephora) is from Greek mitra a "head dress" and phoretos meaning to "bear" or "wear", referring to the inner petals.

== Species list ==
The following is a list of Mitrephora species accepted by Plants of the World Online as at July 2024:

- Mitrephora alba Ridl.
- Mitrephora amdjahii Weeras. & R.M.K.Saunders
- Mitrephora andamanica Thoth. & D.Das
- Mitrephora basilanensis Merr.
- Mitrephora cagayanensis Merr.
- Mitrephora calcarea Diels ex Weeras. & R.M.K.Saunders
- Mitrephora chulabhorniana Damth., Aongyong & Chaowasku
- Mitrephora clemensiorum Weeras. & R.M.K.Saunders
- Mitrephora diversifolia (Span.) Miq. (Queensland, Indonesia, New Guinea)
- Mitrephora endertii Weeras. & R.M.K.Saunders
- Mitrephora ferruginea Boerl. ex Koord.-Schum.
- Mitrephora fragrans Merr.
- Mitrephora glabra Scheff.
- Mitrephora grandiflora Bedd.
- Mitrephora harae H.Ohashi
- Mitrephora heyneana (Hook.f. & Thomson) Thwaites
- Mitrephora imbricatarum-apicum H.Okada
- Mitrephora keithii Ridl.
- Mitrephora korthalsiana Miq.
- Mitrephora kostermansii Weeras. & R.M.K.Saunders
- Mitrephora lanotan (Blanco) Merr.
- Mitrephora longipetala Miq.
- Mitrephora macclurei Weeras. & R.M.K.Saunders
- Mitrephora macrocarpa (Miq.) Weeras. & R.M.K.Saunders
- Mitrephora maingayi Hook.f. & Thomson
- Mitrephora monocarpa R.M.K.Saunders & Chalermglin
- Mitrephora multifolia Elmer ex Weeras. & R.M.K.Saunders
- Mitrephora obtusa (Blume) Hook.f. & Thomson
- Mitrephora pallens Jovet-Ast
- Mitrephora petelotii Weeras. & R.M.K.Saunders
- Mitrephora phanrangensis Weeras. & R.M.K.Saunders
- Mitrephora pictiflora Elmer
- Mitrephora poilanei Weeras. & R.M.K.Saunders
- Mitrephora polypyrena (Blume) Zoll.
- Mitrephora reflexa Merr.
- Mitrephora rufescens Ridl.
- Mitrephora samarensis Merr.
- Mitrephora simeuluensis Weeras. & R.M.K.Saunders
- Mitrephora sirikitiae Weeras., Chalermglin & R.M.K.Saunders
- Mitrephora sorsogonensis Elmer ex Weeras. & R.M.K.Saunders
- Mitrephora sukhothaiensis Leerat., Chalermglin & R.M.K.Saunders
- Mitrephora sundaica Weeras. & R.M.K.Saunders
- Mitrephora tomentosa Hook.f. & Thomson
- Mitrephora uniflora Weeras. & R.M.K.Saunders
- Mitrephora vittata Weeras. & R.M.K.Saunders
- Mitrephora vulpina C.E.C.Fisch.
- Mitrephora wangii Hu
- Mitrephora weberi Merr.
- Mitrephora williamsii C.B.Rob.
- Mitrephora winitii Craib
- Mitrephora woodii Weeras. & R.M.K.Saunders

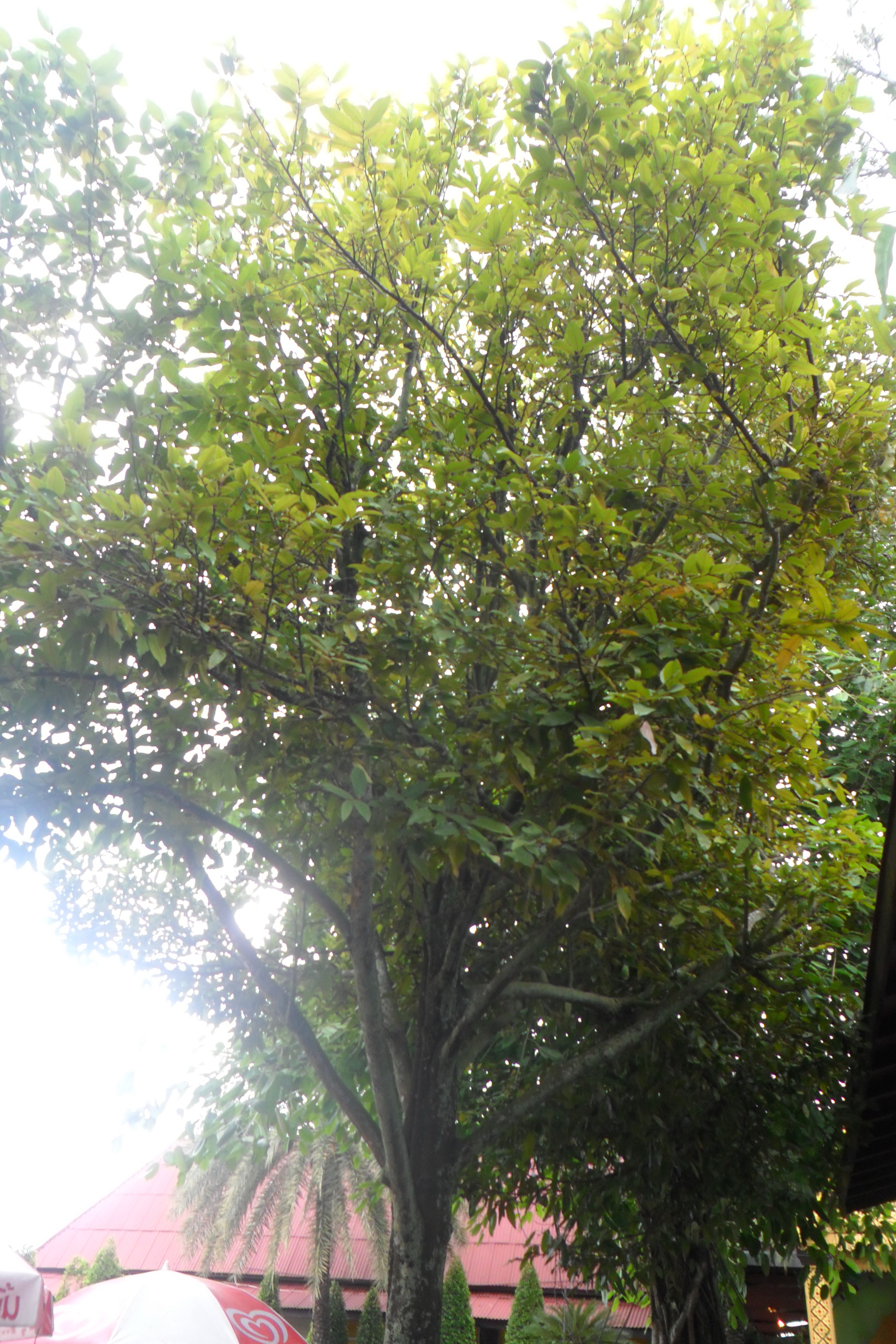
Mitrephora winitii in Nong Nooch Tropical Garden

.
