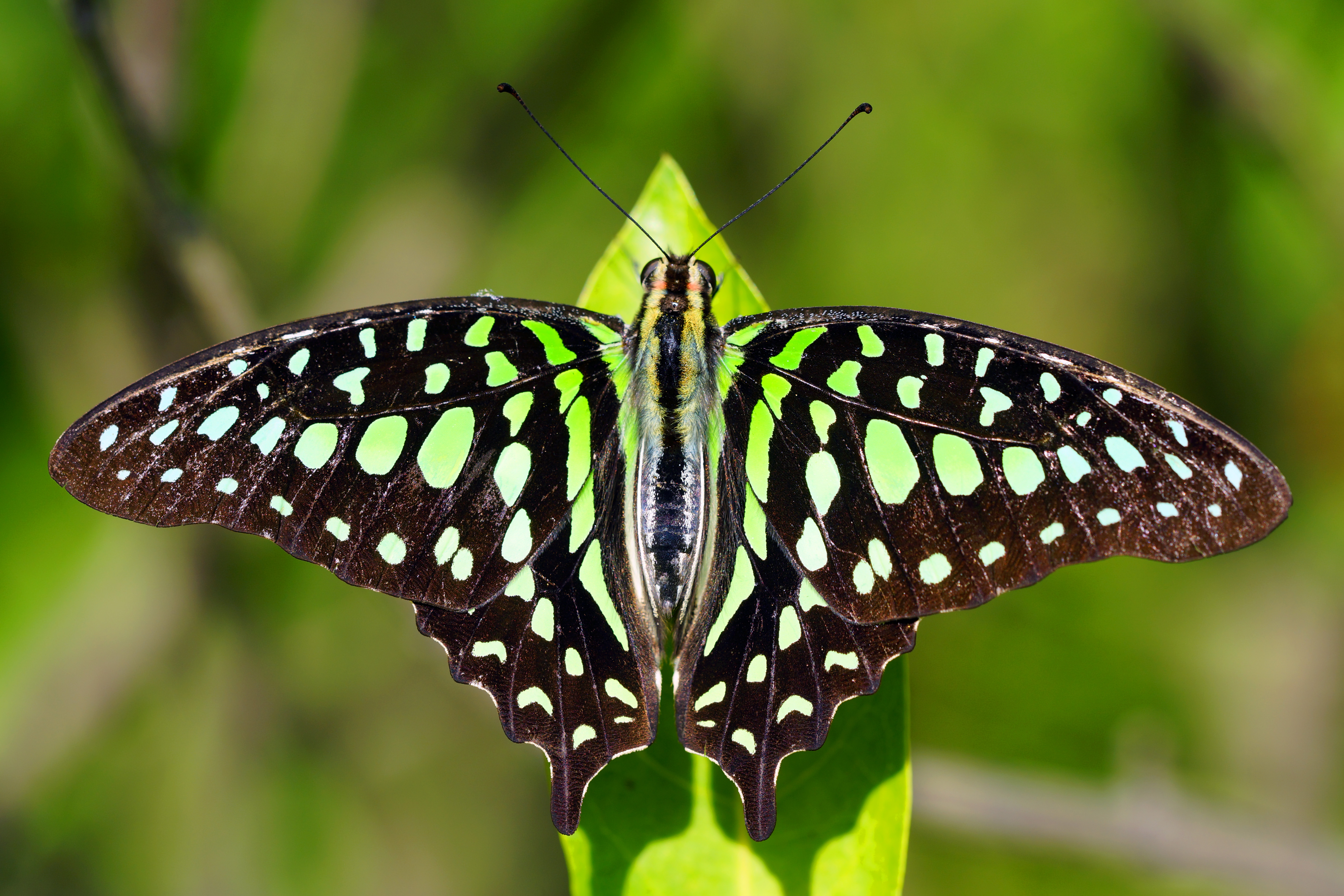

Scientific classification
- Kingdom: Animalia
- Phylum: Arthropoda
- Clade: Pancrustacea
- Class: Insecta
- Order: Lepidoptera
- Family: Papilionidae
- Genus: Graphium
- Species: G. agamemnon

Binomial name
- Graphium agamemnon (Linnaeus, 1758)

Subspecies
- G. a. agamemnon; G. a. plisthenes (C. & R. Felder, 1864); G. a. neopommeranius (Honrath, [1888]); G. a. argynnus (Druce, 1888); G. a. ligatus (Rothschild, 1895); G. a. exilis (Rothschild, 1895); G. a. decoratus (Rothschild, 1895); G. a. guttatus (Rothschild, 1895); G. a. salomonis (Rothschild, 1895); G. a. obliteratus (Lathy, 1899); G. a. menides (Fruhstorfer, 1904); G. a. andamana (Lathy, 1907); G. a. rufoplenus (Fruhstorfer, 1917); G. a. atropictus (Fruhstorfer, 1903); G. a. pulo (Evans, 1932); G. a. baweata (Hagen, 1896); G. a. meton (Fruhstorfer, 1904); G. a. comodus (Fruhstorfer, 1903); G. a. ugiensis (Jordan, 1909); G. a. admiralia (Rothschild, 1915)

Synonyms
- Papilio agamemnon Linnaeus, 1758; Papilio atreus (Fruhstorfer, 1903); Papilio mynion (Fruhstorfer, 1906)

= Graphium agamemnon =

Species of butterfly

Graphium agamemnon, the tailed jay, is a predominantly green and black tropical butterfly that belongs to the swallowtail family. The butterfly is also called the green-spotted triangle, tailed green jay, or green triangle. It is a common, non-threatened species native to Nepal, India and Sri Lanka, through Southeast Asia to Australia. Several geographic races are recognized. The species was first described by Carl Linnaeus in his 1758 10th edition of Systema Naturae.

== Range ==
Southern India to Saurashtra, northern India (Kumaon to Assam), Nepal, Sri Lanka, Andamans, Nicobars, Bangladesh, Brunei, Myanmar, Thailand, Malaysia, Laos, Cambodia, Indonesia, Vietnam, Singapore, southern China (including Hainan), Taiwan, Japan (Ryukyu Islands), South East Asia to New Guinea, Bougainville, Solomon Islands, and Australia (northern Queensland).

== Description ==
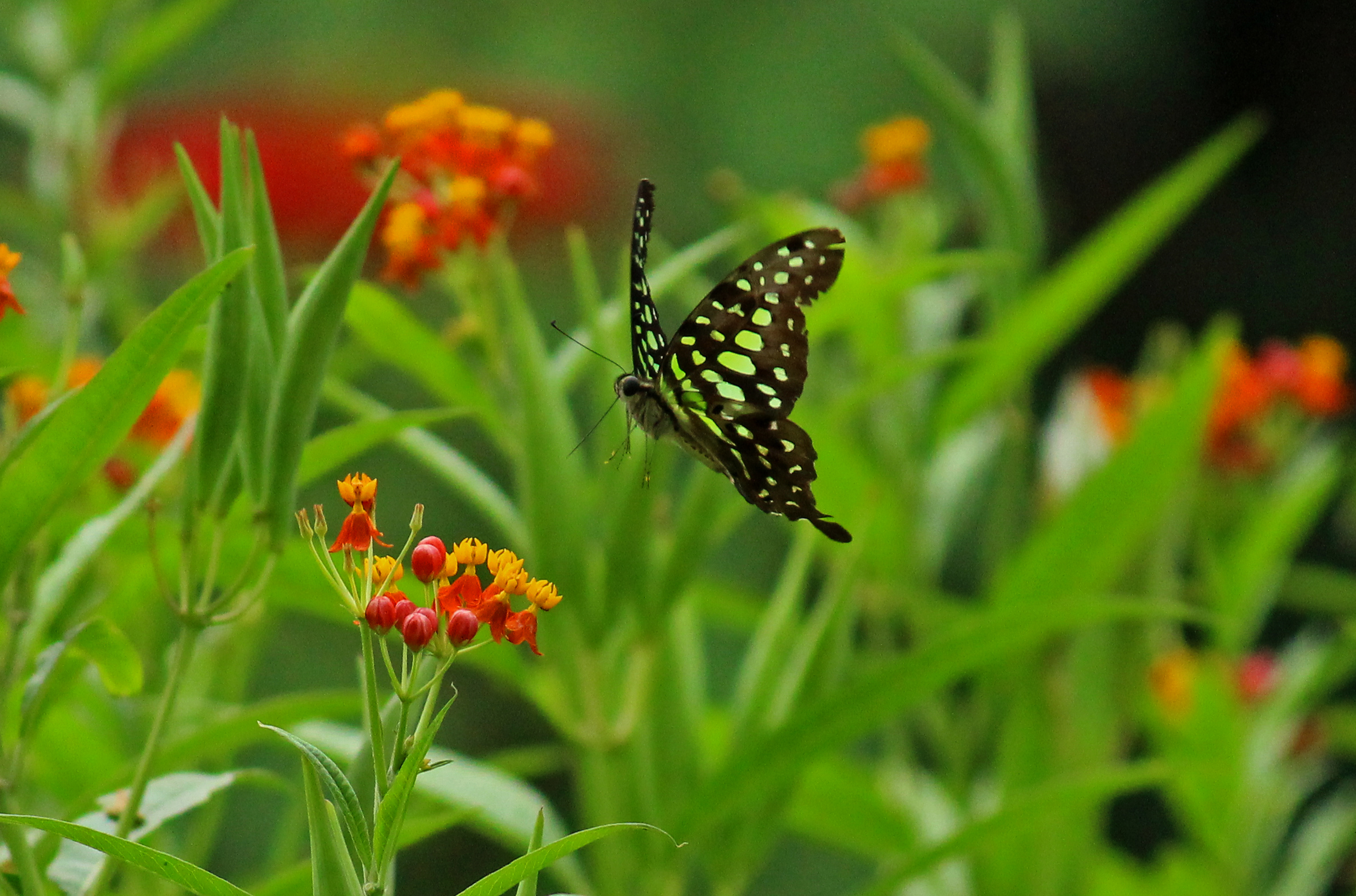
Tailed jay searching for nectar, Hyderabad, India

Male upperside black. Forewing with the following green markings: a spot at the extreme base of the costal margin, a transverse short bar near base of cell and seven spots beyond, two and two except the apical spot which is single; two spots beyond apex of cell; a spot at base of interspaces 1a and 1, followed by two oblique short macular bands; a discal series of spots decreasing in size towards the costa, and a postdiscal series of smaller spots that begins with two in interspace 1; the spots in interspace 7 in both series are out of line, placed outwards. Hindwing: three series of similarly-coloured markings that ran transversely across the wing more or less parallel to the dorsal margin, the upper markings (those in interspace 7) white; a short greenish stripe at the extreme base of the wing.

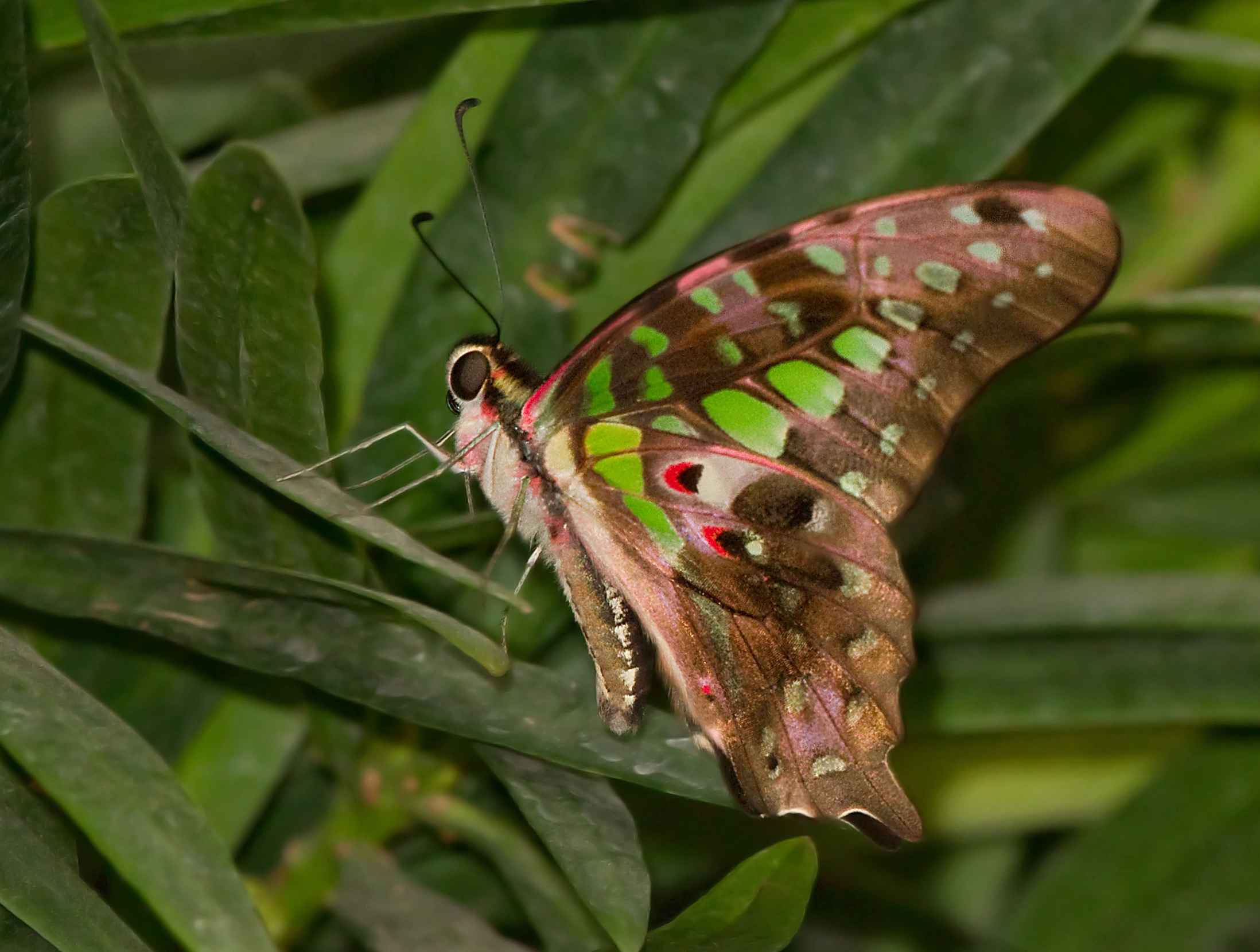
Ventral view

Underside: fuliginous (sooty) brown or brownish black, more or less suffused with pink along the costal margin, on apical area and along the outer margin of the discal markings on the forewing, broadly along the dorsal and terminal margins and at base on interspaces 6 and 7 on the hindwing; markings similar to those on the upperside but less clearly defined and somewhat more grey in tint. Hindwing black, inwardly red-margined spots superposed on the pink area in interspaces 6 and 7. Cilia very narrow, pale pink. Antennae, head, thorax and abdomen black, thorax above and the abdomen on the sides streaked with greenish grey; beneath: ochreous grey touched on the thorax with pink.

Females are similar, but with a streak of greenish white along the dorsal margin on both upper and undersides.

Race decoratus is found in the Andaman and Nicobar islands and is very similar to the typical form, from which it can be distinguished as follows: Upperside green spots smaller, especially the discal series on the forewing. Underside hindwing: the red postcostal spot is relatively small but the red part has much increased against the black part; besides the large red anal mark and the mark before the first disco-cellular veinlet, there is a large red spot in the lower median cellule (interspace 2), a smaller red spot in each of the three preceding cellules (interspaces 3, 4, 5) and a streak-like spot at the base of the lower median cellule.

== Status ==
Graphium agamemnon is common and not threatened.

== Habitat ==
Once found primarily close to wooded country where there is a fairly heavy rainfall, the tailed jay is now very common at low elevations and regularly seen in gardens and urban areas due to its food plant, Polyalthia longifolia (false ashoka or mast tree), being widely used as an ornamental tree.

== Behaviour ==
Strong and restless fliers, they are very active butterflies and flutter their wings constantly even when at flowers. They are seldom seen drinking from damp patches. The males are particularly fond of nectaring from flowers such as Lantana, Ixora, Mussaenda, and Poinsettia. The females are more likely caught when looking for food plants or laying eggs.

Tailed jays are active throughout the year but their abundance depends upon the local monsoon and availability of the larval host plants. The butterflies generally fly among the tree-tops but descend to ground level in search of flowers or host plants. Because of their relatively fast life cycle (just over one month from egg to adult), tailed jays are multivoltine and may produce up to seven or eight broods per year. It has been noted in one instance to be attracted to lights at night.

== Life cycle ==
This species can take from 33–36 days from egg to adult. The species is multivoltine with at least seven or eight broods in a year.

=== Eggs ===
The eggs are pale yellow and are laid singly on the underside of young leaves, and hatch after three or four days.

=== Larva ===
Young larvae are dark yellowish green with a pale yellow band in the middle of the abdomen. From the head, which is moderately large, the body increases in thickness rapidly to the 4th or 5th segment and then tapers gradually down to the tail. It has four pairs of spines. The color is at first smoky black, but at the last molt becomes a light clear green faintly marked with lines of a darker shade. The fully grown larva is green, fusiform and having small black spots. It has a pair of osmeterium and black spines on each thoracic segment, the third pair being orange yellow. A fourth pair is situated on the last segment. The spines are usually black with orange rings at the base of each spine. The caterpillars undergo five instars over a period of 15–16 days, during which many are attacked by parasitoid wasps.

=== Pupa ===
The pupae are green or brownish. They are found attached on the underside of leaves; sometimes on the upperside, and are held in place with a body girdle. The pupal stage lasts for 13–14 days. The horns are tipped with rusty brown.

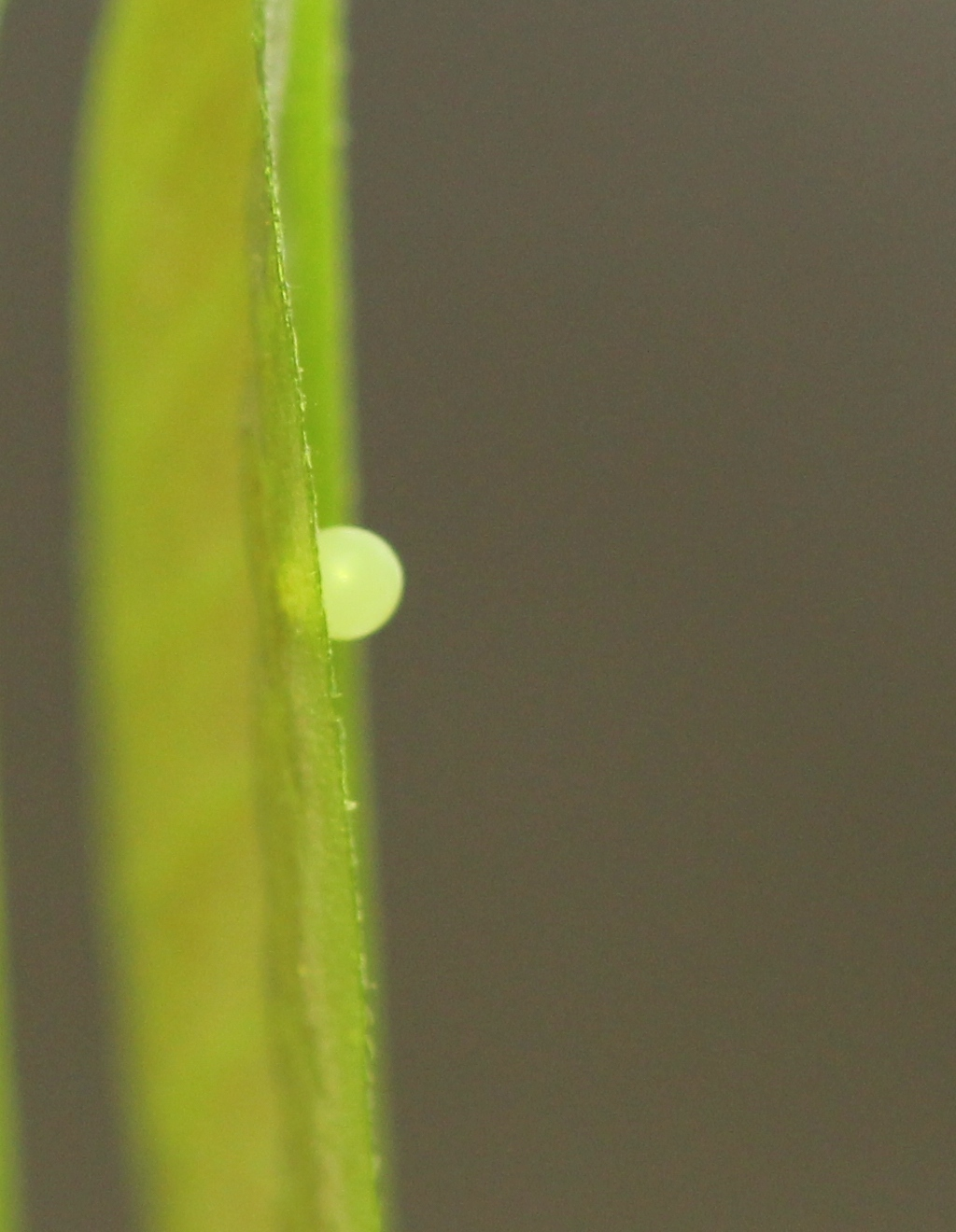
Freshly laid egg on Polyalthia longifolia

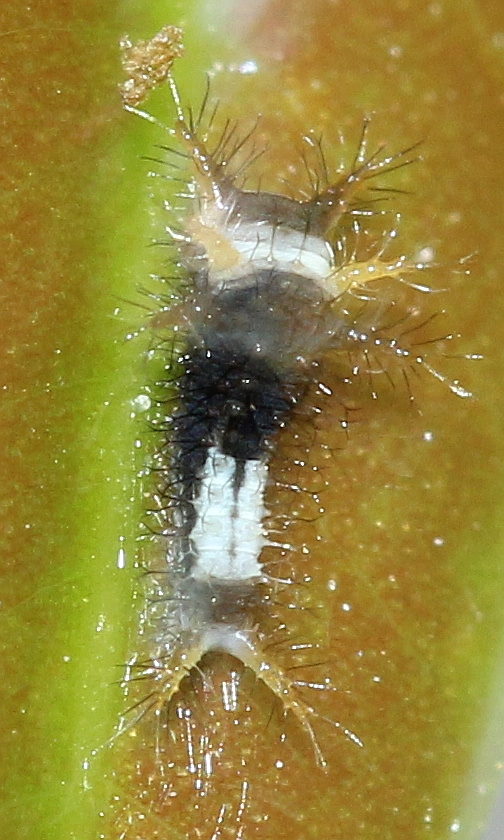
Caterpillar in 1st instar

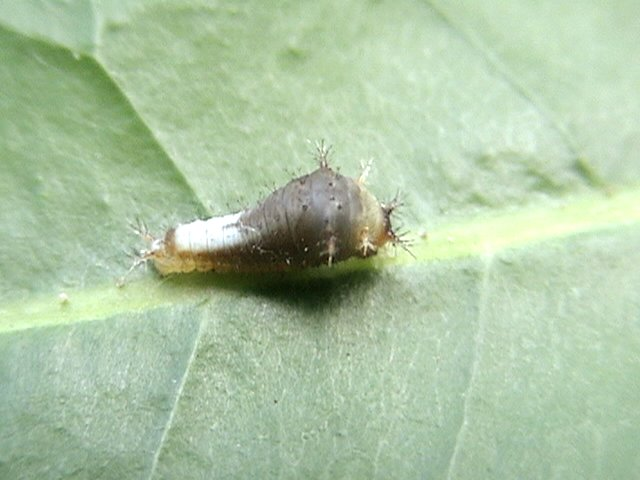
Caterpillar in 2nd instar

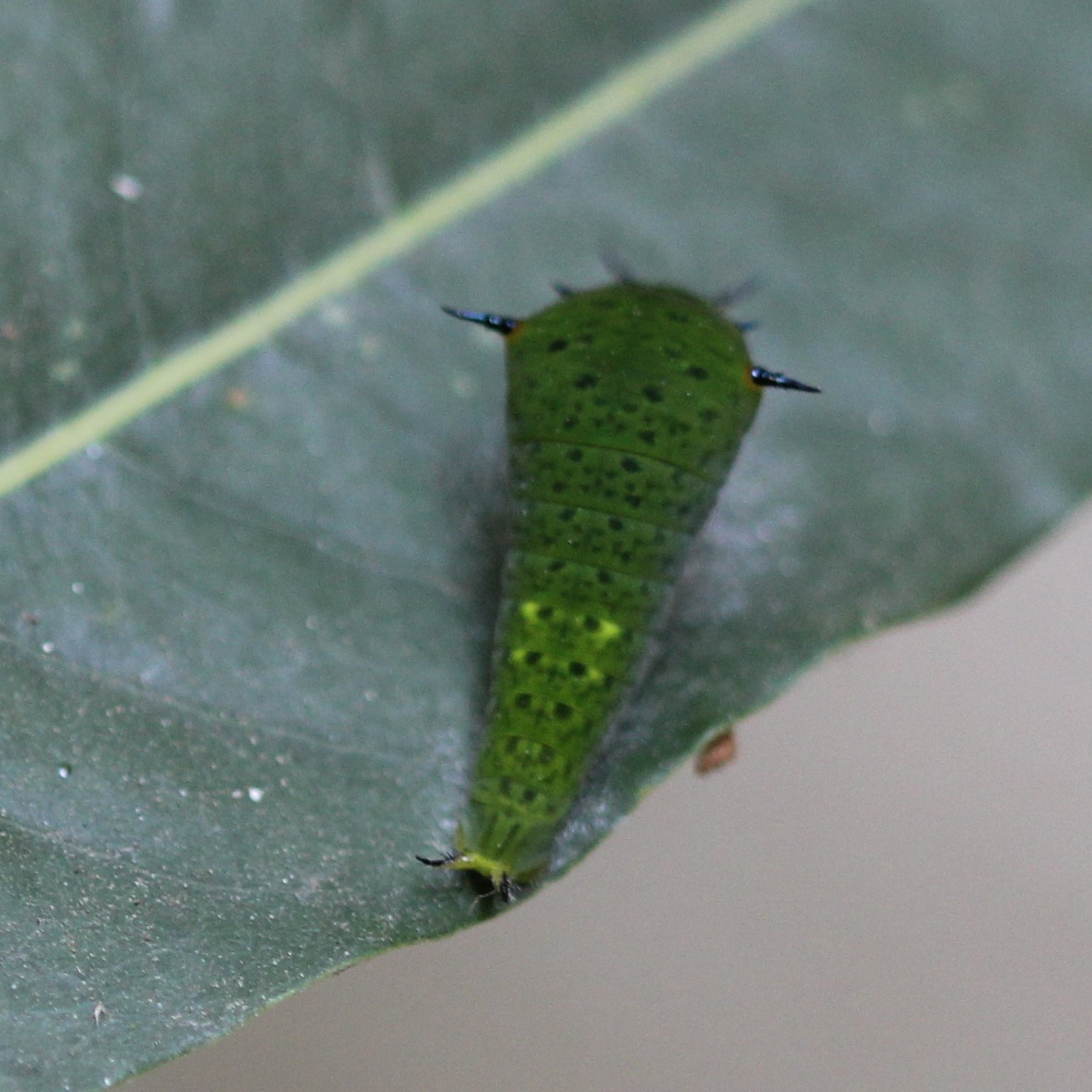
3rd instar

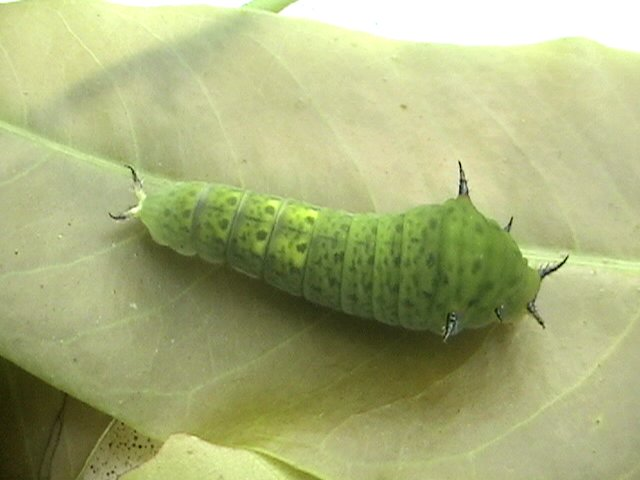
Caterpillar in 4th instar

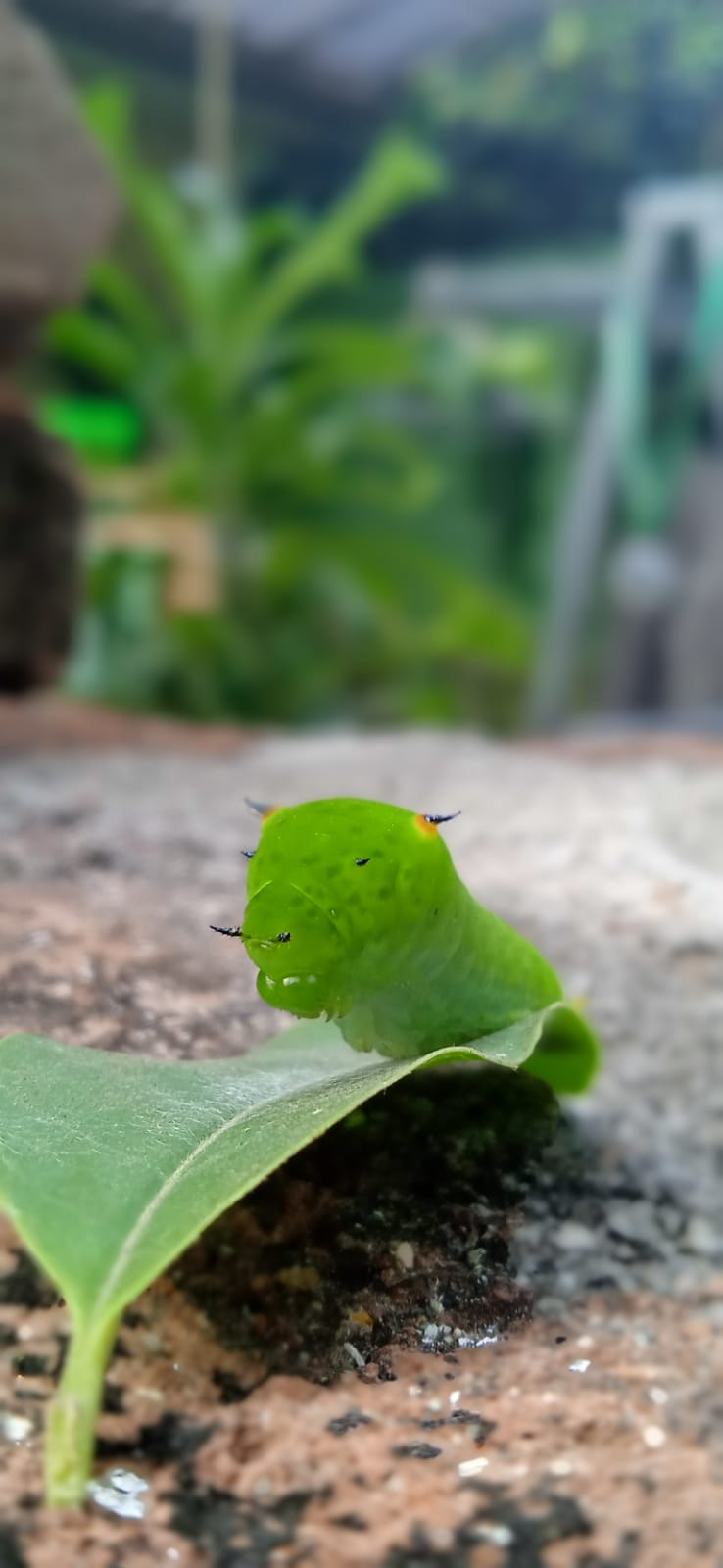
Last instar

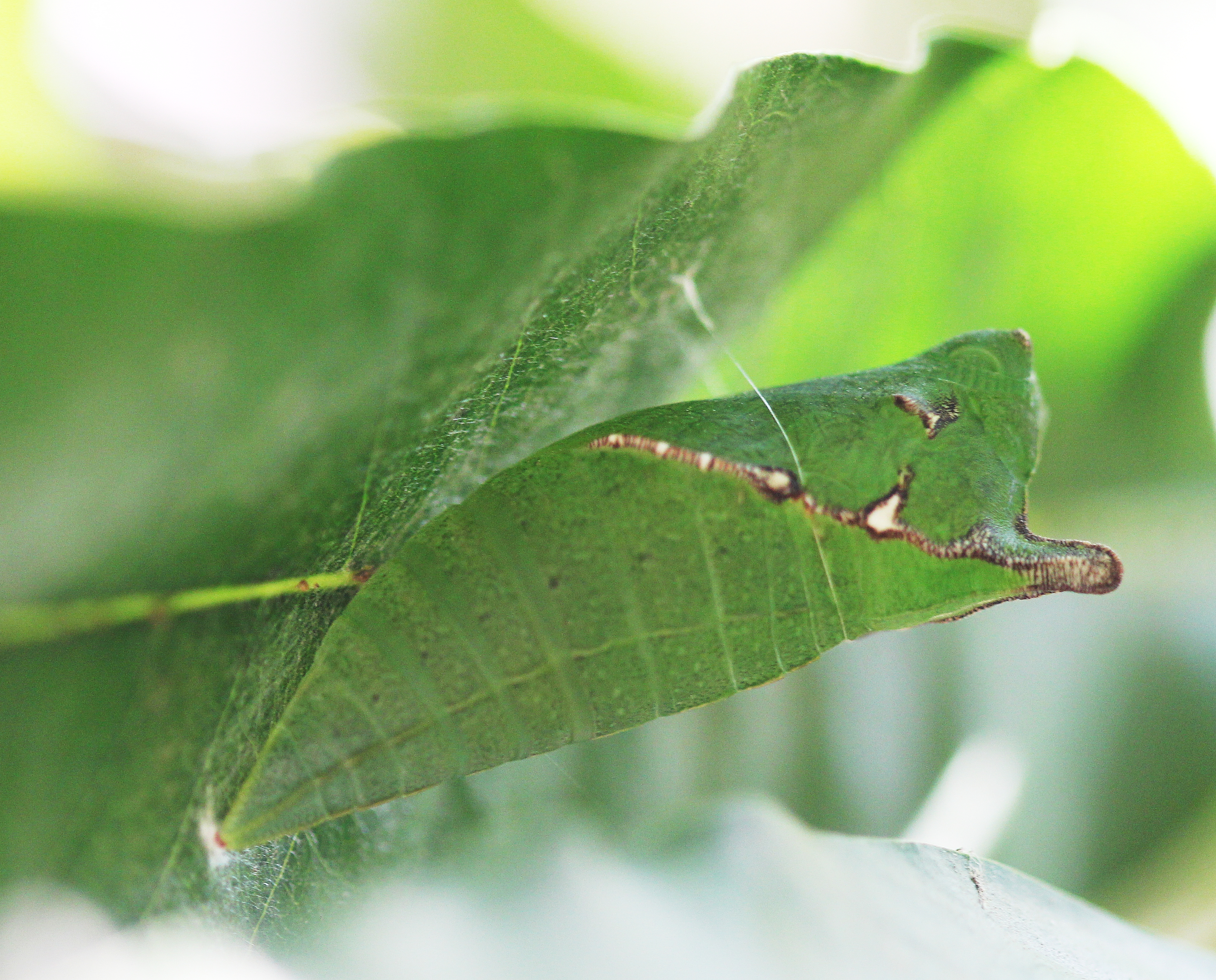
Pupa of the tailed jay

== Food plants ==
Polyalthia longifolia, Polyalthia cerasoides, Annona squamosa, Annona reticulata, Annona discolor, Annona muricata, Goniothalamus cardiopetalus, Mitrephora heyneana and Uvaria narum of the family Annonaceae, Michelia doltospa, Michelia champaca, Milliusa tomentosum, Cinnamomum spp., and Artabotrys hexapetalus.

== See also ==
- Graphium doson - the blue jay
- List of butterflies of India (Papilionidae)
