= Mitrephora calcarea =

Conservation status
- Vulnerable (IUCN 3.1)

Scientific classification
- Kingdom: Plantae
- Clade: Embryophytes
- Clade: Tracheophytes
- Clade: Spermatophytes
- Clade: Angiosperms
- Clade: Magnoliids
- Order: Magnoliales
- Family: Annonaceae
- Genus: Mitrephora
- Species: M. calcarea

Binomial name
- Mitrephora calcarea Diels ex Weeras. & R.M.K.Saunders

Species of plant in the soursop family

Mitrephora calcarea is a species of flowering plant in the family Annonaceae. It is a tree native to Laos and Vietnam. Aruna Weerasooriya and Richard M.K. Saunders, the botanists who provided the first valid formal description of the species, named it after the limy (calcareus in Latin) soil it grows in. The name follows a prior invalid account by Suzanne Jovet-Ast, which lacked a Latin description.

== Description ==
It is a tree. Its branches have lenticels and sparsely covered in fine light brown hairs. Its oval to lance-shaped, leathery leaves are 7.5–14 by 3–5 centimeters (3.0–5.5 by 1.2–2.0 in) with pointed bases and tips. The upper surfaces of the leaves are hairless while their undersides are slightly hairy. The leaves have 7–15 pairs of secondary veins emanating from their midribs with noticeable interconnecting tertiary veins. Its petioles are 3.5–8.5 by 1.2–2.3 millimeters and covered in sparse, brown hairs. Its flowers are born opposite the leaves on inflorescences in groups of 3 or fewer. The flowers are on a fleshy, densely hairy pedicel that is 5–7 by 1.2–2.2 millimeters. The pedicels have an oval, basal bract that is 2 by 2 millimeters, and another bract at their midpoint that is 2.3–3 by 2.4–2.6 millimeters. Its flowers have 3 brown, oval sepals that are 4–6 by 3–3.5 millimeters. The outer surface of the sepals is densely hairy, while their inner surfaces is hairless except at the tips. Its 6 petals are arranged in two rows of 3. The white, oval to lance-shaped outer petals are 17–21 by 8.5–10.5 millimeters and come to a point at their tip. The outer surfaces of the outer petals are densely hairy, while their inner surfaces are slightly hairy. The margins of the outer petals become wavy when mature. The reddish, inner petals are 12–13.5 by 7–9 millimeters. The inner petals have a basal claw and a rhomboidal blade. Its flowers have more than 100 yellow stamens that are 1–1.2 by 0.4–0.6 millimeters. Its flower have 4–6 carpels that are 1.3–1.5 by 0.6–0.8 millimeters and covered in fine hairs. Its stigma is shaped like a narrow, inverted cone. The carpels have 8–12 ovules arranged in two rows. The fruit are born on woody pedicels that are 7.5–12 by 1.7–3.2 millimeters. The oblong, smooth, dull grey-blue, fruit occur in groups of 2–4 and are 3.3–4.2 by 1.4–1.7 centimeters and covered in dense, fine hairs. The fruit have up to 8 oval, brown seeds that are 11 by 8 millimeters.

=== Reproductive biology ===
The pollen of M. calcarea is shed as permanent tetrads.

== Habitat and distribution ==
It has been observed growing in limestone forests at elevations of 100 meters (330 ft).
