= Mitrephora williamsii =

Conservation status
- Endangered (IUCN 3.1)

Scientific classification
- Kingdom: Plantae
- Clade: Embryophytes
- Clade: Tracheophytes
- Clade: Spermatophytes
- Clade: Angiosperms
- Clade: Magnoliids
- Order: Magnoliales
- Family: Annonaceae
- Genus: Mitrephora
- Species: M. williamsii

Binomial name
- Mitrephora williamsii C.B.Rob.

Species of plant in the soursop family

Mitrephora williamsii is a species of plant in the family Annonaceae. It is native to the Philippines. Charles Budd Robinson, the Canadian botanist who first formally described the species, named it after Robert Statham Williams who collected the specimen that Robinson examined.

== Description ==
It is a tree reaching 12 meters (39 ft) in height. Its oval leaves are 20–32 by 7–11.5 centimeters (7.9–12.6 by 2.8–4.5 in) and come to a point at their tips. The leaves are smooth and shiny green on their upper surfaces while their undersides are brown-green and slightly hairy. The leaves have 20–25 pairs of secondary veins emanating from their midribs. Its petioles are 12–18 by 2.5–4 millimeters. Its fragrant flowers are red and yellow and are arranged in cymes opposite the leaves. Each flower is on a hairy pedicel 5–8 millimeters long. Its flowers have 3, oval-shaped sepals, 5–6 millimeters long, that come to a point at their tip. Its 6 petals are arranged in two rows of 3. The outer petals are 13–15 by 9–10 millimeters, hairy on their outer surface and smooth inside. The inner petals have a 10 by 2 millimeter claw below a 6–7 by 7.5 millimeter hood-shaped blade which is hairy on its inner surface. It has approximately 200–250 stamens that are 0.8–1 millimeter long.

=== Reproductive biology ===
The pollen of M. williamsii is shed as permanent tetrads.

== Habitat and distribution ==
It has been observed growing in low elevation forests.
