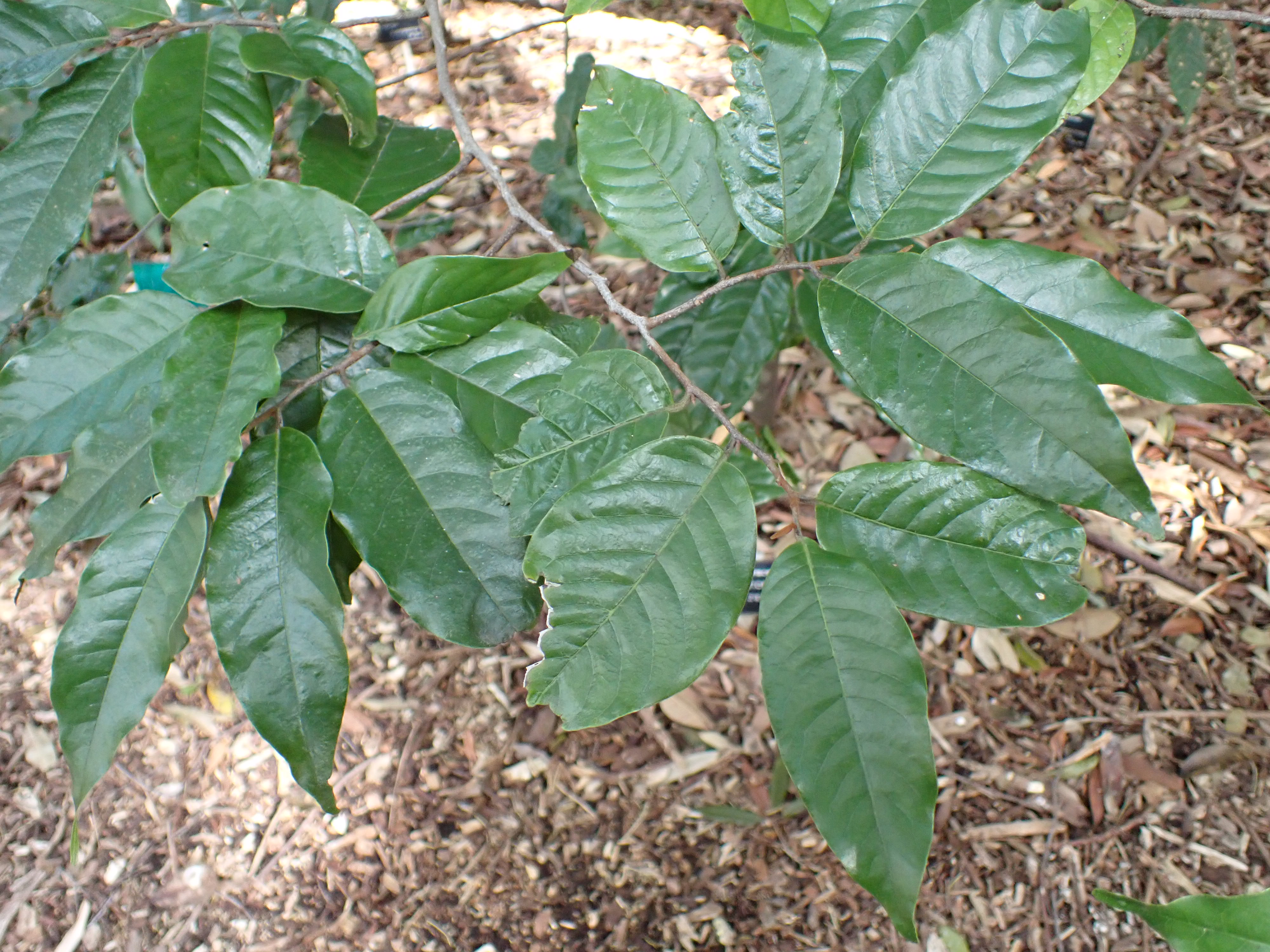
- In Mount Coot-tha Botanic Gardens

Conservation status
- Least Concern (IUCN 3.1)

Scientific classification
- Kingdom: Plantae
- Clade: Embryophytes
- Clade: Tracheophytes
- Clade: Spermatophytes
- Clade: Angiosperms
- Clade: Magnoliids
- Order: Magnoliales
- Family: Annonaceae
- Genus: Mitrephora
- Species: M. diversifolia

Binomial name
- Mitrephora diversifolia (Span.) Miq.

Synonyms
- Unona diversifolia Span.; Uvaria diversifolia (Span.) Walp.; Kinginda diversifolia Kuntze; Mitrephora ochracea (Burck) Diels; Mitrephora zippeliana Miq.; Uvaria ochracea Burck

= Mitrephora diversifolia =

Species of flowering plant

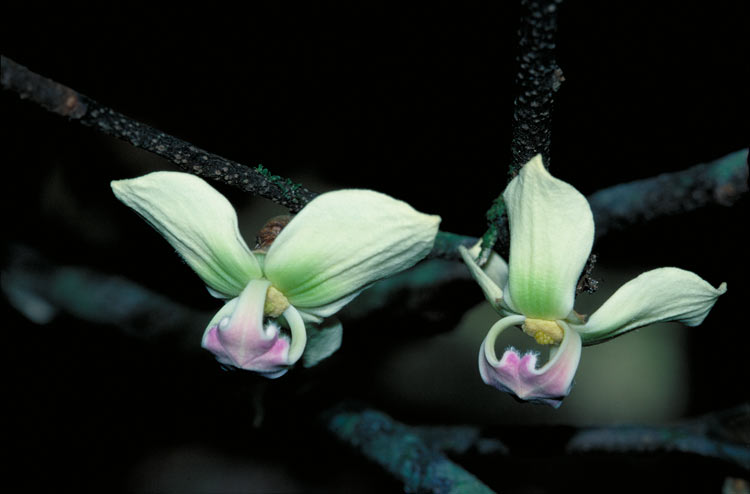
Flowers

Mitrephora diversifolia is a species of flowering plant in the family Annonaceae. It is a tree native to Queensland, New Guinea, Ambon Island, the Lesser Sunda Islands, and Sulawesi. It is a tree with egg-shaped leaves, the flowers with cream-coloured and mauve-pink petals, 70 to 85 stamens and 10 to 14 carpels. The fruit is egg-shaped containing up to 8 seeds.

== Description ==
Mitrephora diversifolia is a tree that typically grows to a height of up to 15 m (49 ft). Its leaves are egg-shaped, 80–300 mm (3.1–11.8 in) long, 30–90 mm (1.2–3.5 in) wide on a petiole 4–6 mm (0.16–0.24 in) long and have 9 to 11 pairs of secondary veins. The flowers are arranged singly in leaf axils on a peduncle up to 15 mm (0.59 in) long, the pedicel 4–6 mm (0.16–0.24 in) long. The sepals are 4 mm (0.16 in) long and densely hairy. Its outer petals cream-coloured, egg-shaped with the narrower end towards the base, 18–22 mm (0.71–0.87 in) long and 13–15 mm (0.51–0.59 in) wide. The inner petals are 5 mm (0.20 in) long and 7 mm (0.28 in) wide, with a mauve-pink, hairy, spade-shaped or arrow-shaped blade. There are 70 to 85 stamens and 10 to 14 carpels each containing 10 ovules. Flowering mostly occurs between October and March, and fruit is egg-shaped, 20–30 mm (0.79–1.18 in) long and 12–20 mm (0.47–0.79 in) wide, containing up to 8 seeds.

== Taxonomy ==
This species was first described in 1841 by Johan Baptist Spanoghe who gave it the name Unona ? diversifolia in the journal Linnaea. In 1858, Friedrich Anton Wilhelm Miquel transferred the species to the genus Mitrephora as M. diversifolia. The specific epithet (diversifolia) means "unlike-" or "different-leaved".

== Distribution and habitat ==
Mitrephora diversifolia is native to the Lesser Sunda Islands, Ambon Island in the Maluku Islands, Sulawesi, New Guinea, and northern Queensland.In Queensland it grows in vine forest from the tip of Cape York Peninsula to the McIlwraith Range.
