= Mitrephora caudata =

Conservation status
- Vulnerable (IUCN 2.3)

Scientific classification
- Kingdom: Plantae
- Clade: Tracheophytes
- Clade: Angiosperms
- Clade: Magnoliids
- Order: Magnoliales
- Family: Annonaceae
- Genus: Mitrephora
- Species: M. caudata

Binomial name
- Mitrephora caudata Merr.

Species of flowering plant

Mitrephora caudata is a species of flowering plant in the family Annonaceae. It is endemic to the Philippines.
