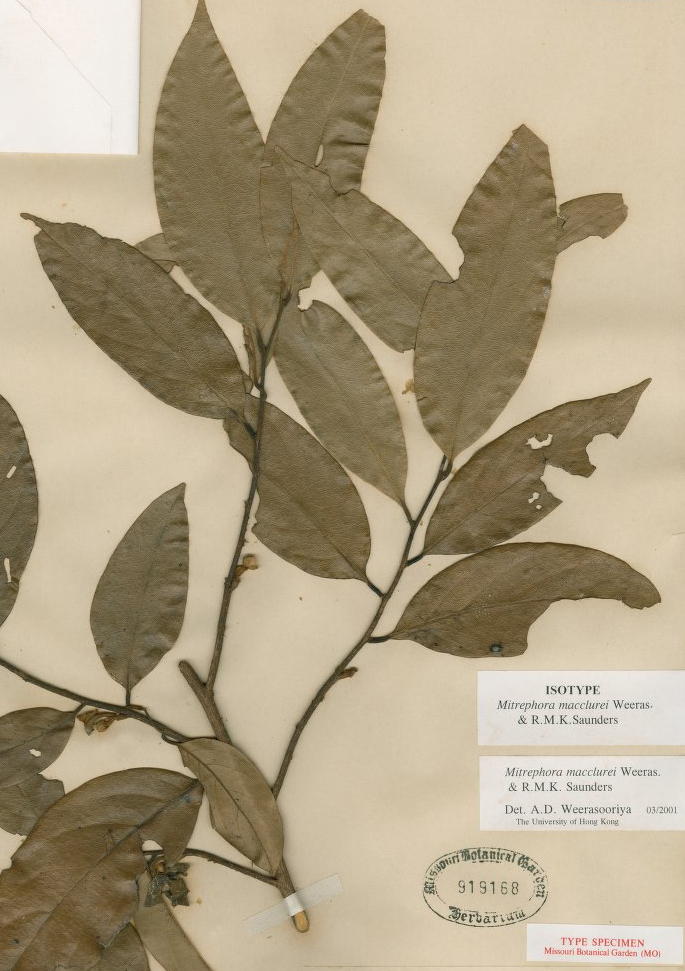
- Photograph of the leaves of Mitrephora macclurei

Conservation status
- Near Threatened (IUCN 3.1)

Scientific classification
- Kingdom: Plantae
- Clade: Tracheophytes
- Clade: Angiosperms
- Clade: Magnoliids
- Order: Magnoliales
- Family: Annonaceae
- Genus: Mitrephora
- Species: M. macclurei

Binomial name
- Mitrephora macclurei Weeras. & R.M.K.Saunders

= Mitrephora macclurei =

Species of plant in the soursop family

Mitrephora macclurei is a species of flowering plant in the family Annonaceae. It is a tree native to southern China, Laos, Vietnam, Thailand, and Peninsular Malaysia. Aruna Weerasooriya and Richard Saunders, the botanists who first formally described the species, named it after Floyd Alonzo McClure of Lingnan University (formerly Canton Christian College), who collected the holotype specimen that they examined.

== Description ==
It is a tree reaching 7–10 meters (23–33 ft) in height. Its branches have lenticels. Its leathery, lance-shaped leaves are 8–14 by 3–4.5 centimeters (3.1–5.5 by 1.2–1.8 in) with shallowly pointed bases and pointed tips. The upper side of the leaves are glossy and hairless, while the undersides are covered in sparse, fine hairs. The leaves have 7–9 pairs of secondary veins emanating from their midribs. Its petioles are 6–8.5 by 1.4–2 millimeters and covered in sparse, fine hairs. The flowers occur in groups of 3 or fewer on a rachis positioned opposite leaves. Flowers are attached to the rachis by fleshy, densely hairy pedicels that are 12–20 by 1.1–1.5 millimeters. The pedicels have an oval, basal bract that is 3.5 by 2.5 millimeters, and another upper bract that is 1.5–2.5 by 2–4 millimeters. Its flowers have 3 oval sepals that are 3–4 by 3–3.5 millimeters. The sepals are covered in dense, velvety, brown hairs on their outer surface and sparse hairs on their inner surface. Its 6 petals are arranged in two rows of 3. The outer petals are initially white, turning yellow at maturity. The elliptical to oval, outer petals are 1.8–2.5 by 1.1–2.0 centimeters and come to a point at their tips. The outer petals are covered in sparse, brown, fine hairs inside and out. The purple inner petals are 11–13 by 6.5–8.5 millimeters with a basal claw. The inner petals have sparse, fine hairs on their outer surface. The inner surface of inner petals is covered in hairs that become longer at the tip. Its flowers have more than 100 yellow stamen that are 1.5–1.9 by 0.7–0.9 millimeters. Its flowers have 7–8 carpels that are 2–2.5 by 0.9 millimeters. The carpels have 8–10 ovules. Its fruit occur in clusters of up to 6 on woody pedicels that are 13 by 4 millimeters and covered in sparse, fine hairs. The smooth, sparsely hairy, oval fruit are 3.8 by 2.5 centimeters. The fruit are attached to the pedicel by stipes that are 14–18 by 3.5–4 millimeters and covered in sparse, brown, fine hairs. Each fruit has 4–8 oval, brown, seeds that are 1.2 by 1.0 centimeters.

=== Reproductive biology ===
The pollen of M. macclurei is shed as permanent tetrads.

== Habitat and distribution ==
It is native to Laos, Vietnam, Thailand, and Peninsular Malaysia, and to southern Yunnan, southern Guizhou, Guangxi, and Hainan in southern China. It has been observed growing in forests, often near rivers, with limestone soil at elevations of 800 meters (2,600 ft).
