= Mitrephora alba =

Conservation status
- Vulnerable (IUCN 3.1)

Scientific classification
- Kingdom: Plantae
- Clade: Embryophytes
- Clade: Tracheophytes
- Clade: Spermatophytes
- Clade: Angiosperms
- Clade: Magnoliids
- Order: Magnoliales
- Family: Annonaceae
- Genus: Mitrephora
- Species: M. alba

Binomial name
- Mitrephora alba Ridl.

Species of plant in the soursop family

Mitrephora alba is a species of flowering plant in the family Annonaceae. It is a tree native to central and southern Thailand and Peninsular Malaysia. Henry Nicholas Ridley, the English botanist who first formally described the species, named it after its white (albus in Latin) flowers.

== Description ==
It is a tree reaching 12 meters (39 ft) in height. Its branches have gray bark and are sparsely covered in fine pale brown hairs. Its leathery, oval to lance-shaped leaves are 6–18 by 3–6.5 centimeters (2.4–7.1 by 1.2–2.6 in) with pointed to tapering tips and rounded or pointed to shallowly pointed bases. The upper surfaces of the leaves are matt and hairless and the undersides have sparse fine hairs. The leaves have 7–11 pairs of secondary veins emanating from their midribs. Its petioles are 2–6 by 1–2 millimeters and covered in sparse fine hairs. Its inflorescence are composed of up to 3 flowers on a rachis that is covered in pale brown velvety hair. Each flower is born on a fleshy pedicel that is 10–16 by 0.7–0.9 millimeters and densely covered in fine brown hairs. Oval bracts at the base of pedicels are 1–1.5 by 1 millimeters while those at top are 1–1.5 by 1–1.5 millimeters. Its oval to triangular sepals are 1.5–2.5 by 2.5–3 millimeters. The outer surfaces of the sepals have sparse, fine, brown hairs; the inner surfaces are hairless or nearly so. Its flowers have 6 petals in two rows of three. The white, oval, outer petals are 13–21 by 10–16 millimeters with pointed tips and wavy margins when mature. Both surfaces of the outer petals are sparsely covered in fine hairs. The inner petals are 9–15 by 5.5–11 millimeters and white with pink to purple highlights on their margins. The inner petals have a narrow claw below a somewhat tri-lobed blade, with the outer lobes rounded and the middle one pointed. The apices of the inner petals converge but are not fused. The outer surfaces of the inner petals are densely covered in fine hairs; the inner surface is covered in woolly hairs near tip. Its flowers have numerous oblong stamen are 0.9–1.4 by 0.6–0.7 millimeters. Its flowers have up to 16 carpels that are 0.9–1.5 by 0.7–0.9 millimeters. Its ovaries have 5–10 ovules. Its fruit are found in clusters of 4–8. The oblong, sometimes kidney-shaped fruit are 1.6–3.8 by 1–1.8 centimeters. The fruit are warty to a variable degree, have a longitudinal ridge, and are sparsely covered in fine pale brown hairs. The fruit are born on 6–15 by 3–4.5 millimeter stipes that are sparsely covered in fine, gray-brown hairs. The stipes are attached to a pedicels that is 9–17 by 1.5–4.5 millimeters and sparsely covered in fine hairs. The fruit have 5–10 seeds that are 10–12 by 7–9 millimeters.

=== Reproductive biology ===
The pollen of M. alba is shed as permanent tetrads.

== Habitat and distribution ==
It has been observed growing in evergreen moist forests at elevations of 0 to 70 meters (230 ft).

== Uses ==
Bioactive diterpenes extracted from its branches have been reported to have moderate cytotoxic activity in test with cultured human lung cancer cells.
