= Mitrephora glabra =

Conservation status
- Least Concern (IUCN 3.1)

Scientific classification
- Kingdom: Plantae
- Clade: Embryophytes
- Clade: Tracheophytes
- Clade: Spermatophytes
- Clade: Angiosperms
- Clade: Magnoliids
- Order: Magnoliales
- Family: Annonaceae
- Genus: Mitrephora
- Species: M. glabra

Binomial name
- Mitrephora glabra Scheff.

Species of flowering plant

Mitrephora glabra is a species of flowering plant in the family Annonaceae. It is a tree endemic to Borneo. Rudolph Scheffer, the Dutch botanist who first formally described the species, named it after its hairless (glabrous in Latin) leaves and mature twigs.

== Description ==
It is a tree reaching 15–20 meters (49–66 ft) in height. Its twigs are hairless when mature. Its papery to leathery, elliptical to lance-shaped leaves are 6.5–25 by 1.5–6.5 centimeters (2.6–9.8 by 0.59–2.6 in) with wedge shaped bases and tips that taper to a point. Both sides of the leaves are hairless except for short hairs on the upper surface of the midrib. The leaves have 5-15 pairs of secondary veins emanating from their midribs that arch to form loops near the leaf margins. Its petioles are 2.5–9 by 1–2.5 millimeters and covered in sparse fine hairs. Its flowers are born opposite the leaves on inflorescences in groups of 3 or fewer. The flowers are on fleshy, densely hairy pedicels that are 5.5–13 by 0.5–3.5 millimeters. The pedicels have an oval, basal bract that is 1 by 1 millimeters, and another bract at their midpoint that is 1–1.5 by 1–2.5 millimeters. Its flowers have 3 triangular to oval sepals that are 1.5–3 by 2–3.5 millimeters. The sepals are covered in dense, brown hairs on their outer surface and sparse hairs on their inner surface. Its 6 petals are arranged in two rows of 3. The yellow, elliptical to oval, outer petals are 1–2.4 by 0.6–1.2 centimeters and come to a point at their tips. The outer petals are covered in light brown hairs on both surfaces, with fewer inside. The inner petals are yellow with pink to purple highlights at their tips. The inner petals are 9–13 by 2.5–5.5 millimeters with a narrow, basal claw and a rhomboidal blade. The inner petals have sparse hairs on their outer surface and dense, brown, woolly hairs on their inner surface. Its flowers have stamen that are 0.8–1.1 by 0.3–0.6 millimeters. The carpels have 10–12 ovules. Its flowers have 15-17 carpels that are 1–1.5 by 0.3–0.5 millimeters. Its fruit occur in clusters of 10–15 on pedicels that are 7–23 by 1.5–4.5 millimeters and covered in sparse hairs. The smooth, oval fruit are 1.8–3.4 by 1.1–2.1 centimeters with flat tips. The fruit are attached to the pedicel by stipes that are 1.5–4 by 1–2.4 millimeters. Each fruit has 6-8 seeds that are 6.5–23.5 by 7–20 millimeters.

=== Reproductive biology ===
The pollen of M. glabra is shed as permanent tetrads. It flowers and sets fruits throughout the year.

== Habitat and distribution ==
It has been observed growing in lowland rain forests, often near rivers and streams, at elevations of 0 to 450 meters (1,480 ft).

== Uses ==
Bioactive compounds isolated from its tissues have been reported to be cytotoxic in tests with cultured human cancer cells and have antimicrobial activity in tests with both fungi and bacteria.
