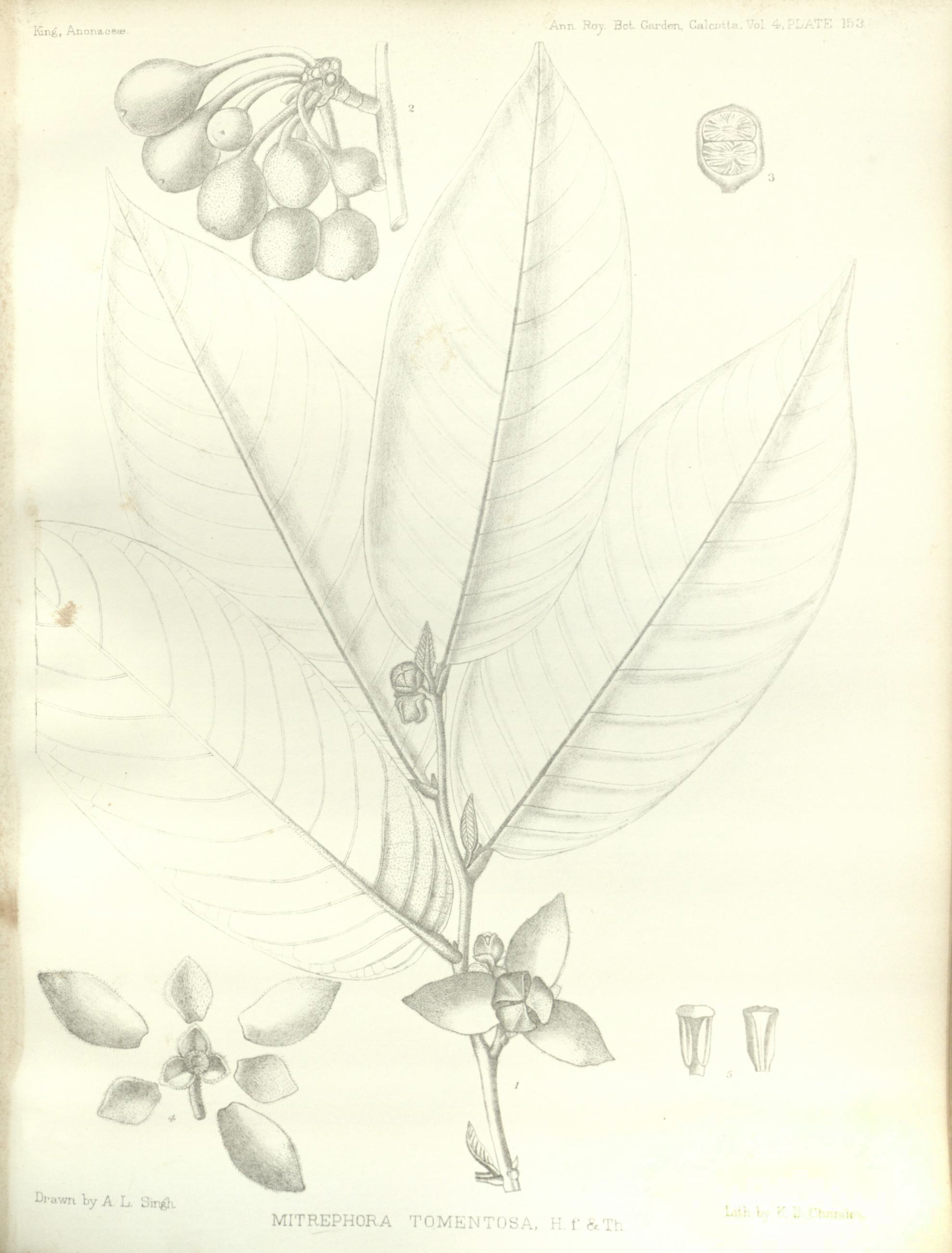
- Botanical illustration of Mitrephora tomentosa

Conservation status
- Least Concern (IUCN 3.1)

Scientific classification
- Kingdom: Plantae
- Clade: Embryophytes
- Clade: Tracheophytes
- Clade: Spermatophytes
- Clade: Angiosperms
- Clade: Magnoliids
- Order: Magnoliales
- Family: Annonaceae
- Genus: Mitrephora
- Species: M. tomentosa

Binomial name
- Mitrephora tomentosa Hook.f. & Thomson

Synonyms
- Kinginda thorelii (Pierre) Kuntze; Kinginda tomentosa (Hook.f. & Thomson) Kuntze; Mitrephora bousigoniana Pierre; Mitrephora collinsiae Craib; Mitrephora edwardsii Pierre; Mitrephora thorelii Pierre; Mitrephora thorelii var. bousigoniana (Pierre) Finet & Gagnep.

= Mitrephora tomentosa =

Species of plant in the soursop family

Mitrephora tomentosa is a species of flowering plant in the family Annonaceae. It is native to Bangladesh, Cambodia, southern China, northeastern India, Laos, Myanmar, Thailand, and Vietnam. Joseph Hooker and Thomas Thomson, the British botanists who first formally described the species, named it after the dense covering of hair (tomentosus in Latin) on its young branches, leaves and flowers.

== Description ==
It is a tree reaching 20 meters (66 ft) in height. Its young branches are densely covered in fine, yellow-brown hairs and have lenticels. Its leathery, oval to lance-shaped leaves are 6.5–21.5 by 3–10 centimeters. The leaves have pointed tips and rounded or slightly lobed bases. The leaves are hairless and shiny on their upper surfaces and densely covered in fine hairs underneath. The leaves have 8–20 pairs of secondary veins emanating from their midribs. Its petioles are 4–12.5 by 1.2–3.5 millimeters and densely covered in fine, short, pale hairs. Its inflorescences are composed of up to 1–2 flowers on a densely hairy rachis positioned opposite from leaves. Each flower is born on a fleshy pedicel that is 11–22.5 by 1–2 millimeters and densely covered in fine yellow-brown hairs. Oval bracts at the base of pedicels are 4.4–5.1 by 3.5–5.1 millimeters while middle bracts are 4.1–7.4 by 5.5–9 millimeters. Its oval sepals are 5–9 by 5–9 millimeters. The outer surfaces of the sepals have dense, yellow-brown hairs; the inner surfaces have sparse hairs at their margins. Its flowers have 6 petals in two rows of three. The yellow, lance-shaped outer petals are 16–34 by 7.5–18 millimeters with pointed tips and wavy margins when mature. The outer surfaces of the outer petals are densely covered in fine brown hairs; the inner surfaces have sparse hairs. The inner petals are 8.5–16.5 by 7–12.5 millimeters and yellow with purple highlights. The inner petals have a basal claw below rhomboidal blade. The outer surfaces of the inner petals are densely covered in short pale brown hairs; the inner surfaces have longer hairs near their tips. Its flowers have numerous yellow, hairless stamen that are 1–1.3 by 0.4–0.6 millimeters. Its flowers have up to 12–17 carpels that are 1.5–1.7 by 0.5–0.8 millimeters. The carpels are covered in fine hairs. Its stigma are shaped like narrow, inverted cones. The carpels have 10–12 ovules arranged in two rows. Its fruit are found in clusters of 9–15. The round fruit are 12–23 by 8.5–19.5 millimeters. The fruit have a longitudinal ridge, their surface has a whitish waxy sheen and short brown hairs. The fruit are born on 16.5–38.5 by 1.5–2.8 millimeter stipes that have dense, long, brown hairs. The stipes are attached to a woody pedicels that is 15–33.5 by 2.7–4.3 millimeters and densely covered in pale brown hairs. The fruit have 4–10 brown, oval seeds that are 12 by 8 millimeters.

=== Reproductive biology ===
The pollen of M. tomentosa is shed as permanent tetrads.

== Habitat and distribution ==
It has been observed growing in evergreen forests at elevations of 50–1,200 meters (160–3,940 ft).
