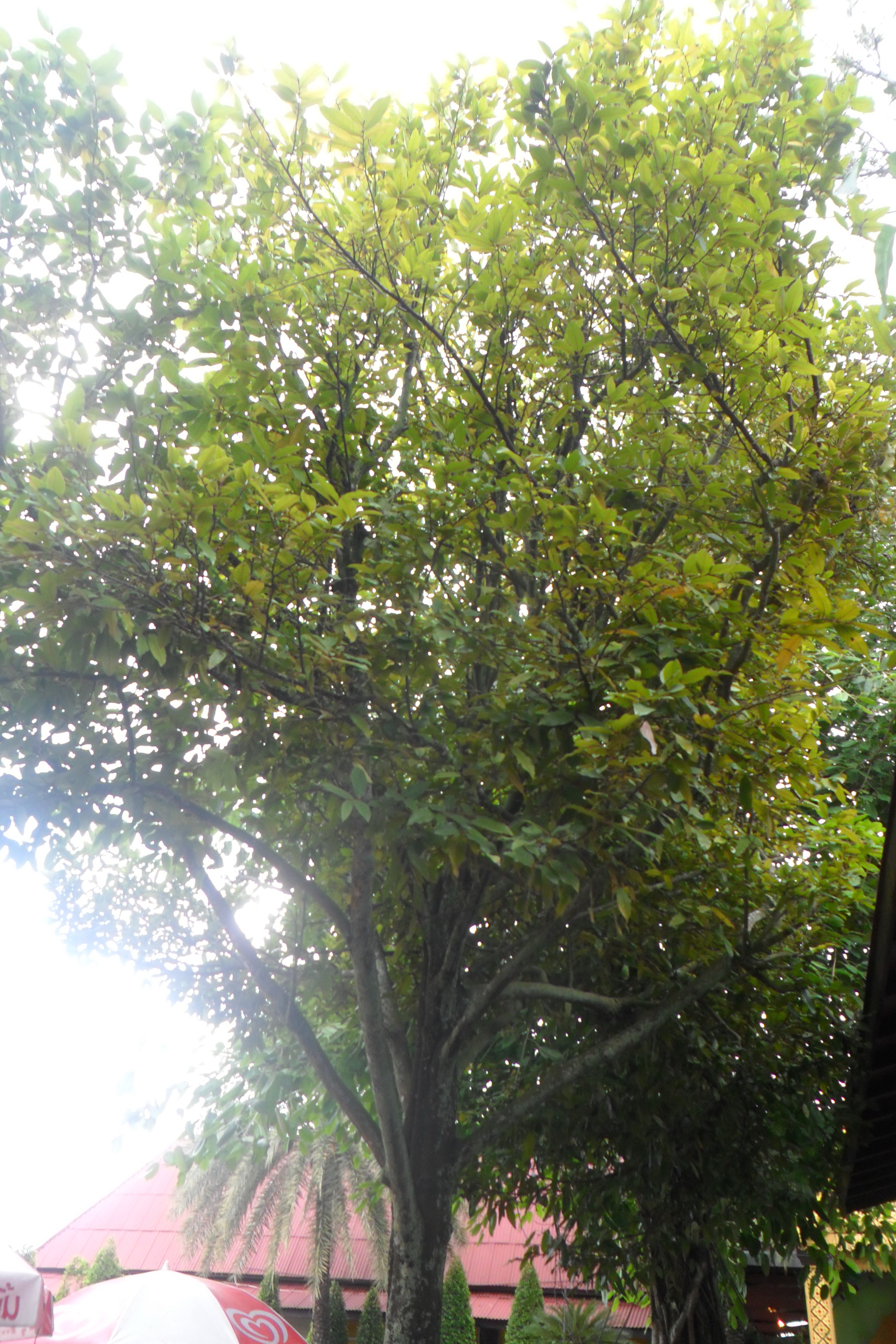

Conservation status
- Vulnerable (IUCN 3.1)

Scientific classification
- Kingdom: Plantae
- Clade: Embryophytes
- Clade: Tracheophytes
- Clade: Spermatophytes
- Clade: Angiosperms
- Clade: Magnoliids
- Order: Magnoliales
- Family: Annonaceae
- Genus: Mitrephora
- Species: M. winitii

Binomial name
- Mitrephora winitii Craib

= Mitrephora winitii =

Species of plant in the soursop family

Mitrephora winitii is a species of plant in the family Annonaceae. It is a tree native to southern Myanmar and southern Thailand. William Grant Craib, the British botanist who first formally described the species, named it after Phya Winit Wanandor, the Thai botanist who collected the specimen that Craib examined. In the Prachuap Khiri Khan province of Thailand it is commonly referred to as Mahaphrom.

== Description ==
It is a tree reaching 10 meters (33 ft) in height. Its leathery, oval to lance-shaped leaves are 11–13.5 by 5–5.6 centimeters (4.3–5.3 by 2.0–2.2 in) with blunt tips. The leaves are smooth on their upper surfaces while their undersides lighter in color and hairy. The base of its leaves are rounded to heart-shaped and their tips are pointed to slightly tapered. The leaves have 11–13 pairs of secondary veins emanating from their midribs. Its petioles are 4.5–6.5 by 2–2.5 millimeters and covered in fine soft hairs. Its inflorescences are composed of up to 3 flowers on a rachis that is densely covered in long, soft, pale brown hairs. Each flower is born on a fleshy pedicel that is 10–16 by 2–3.5 millimeters and densely covered in fine brown hairs. Oval bracts at the base of pedicels are 7–7.5 by 5–8 millimeters while those at the top are 8–10 by 8–10 millimeters. Its flowers have 3 oval sepals that are 7.5–10 by 7.5–11 millimeters. The outer surfaces of the sepals have dense, brown hairs; the inner surfaces are hairless or nearly so. Its 6 petals are arranged in two rows of 3. The white to cream-colored, oval, outer petals are 3.7–4 by 2.2–3 centimeters with pointed tips. The outer surfaces of the outer petals have dense, fine, brown hairs; the inner surfaces have sparse fine hairs that are denser toward the tip. The inner petals are white to cream-colored with purple stripes and are 2.8–3.2 by 2.2–2.5 centimeters. The inner petals are covered in sparse, fine hairs on both surfaces. Its stamens are 2–2.2 by 0.8–1 millimeters. Its flowers have up to 10 carpels that are 2.4–2.6 by 0.8–1 millimeters. Its ovaries have 16–18 ovules. Its fruit are found in clusters of up to 10. The oblong fruit are 1.4–1.8 by 1.1–1.4 centimeters. The fruit are smooth and densely covered in fine pale brown hairs that lay flat against the surface. The fruit are born on 11 by 3.5 millimeter pedicels that are sparsely covered in fine, hairs. The fruit have 4–6 seeds that are 10 by 6.5–7 millimeters.

=== Reproductive biology ===
The pollen of M. winitii is shed as permanent tetrads.

== Habitat and distribution ==
It has been observed growing dry evergreen forests with rocky landscapes at elevations up to 20 meters (66 ft).

== Uses ==
Bioactive compounds extracted from its leaves and twigs have been reported be cytotoxic in tests with cultured human cancer cell lines.
