= Mitrephora macrocarpa =

Conservation status
- Endangered (IUCN 3.1)

Scientific classification
- Kingdom: Plantae
- Clade: Embryophytes
- Clade: Tracheophytes
- Clade: Spermatophytes
- Clade: Angiosperms
- Clade: Magnoliids
- Order: Magnoliales
- Family: Annonaceae
- Genus: Mitrephora
- Species: M. macrocarpa

Binomial name
- Mitrephora macrocarpa (Miq.) Weeras. & R.M.K.Saunders

Synonyms
- Mitrephora celebica Scheff.; Orophea macrocarpa Miq.

Species of plant in the soursop family

Mitrephora macrocarpa is a species of flowering plant in the family Annonaceae. It is a tree native to Sulawesi. Friedrich Anton Wilhelm Miquel, the Dutch botanist who first formally described the species using the basionym Orophea macrocarpa, named it after its large fruit (Latinized forms of Greek μακρoς, macros and καρπoς, karpos).

== Description ==
It is a tree reaching 35 meters (115 ft) in height. Its leathery, oval to lance-shaped leaves are 4–27 by 3–9.5 centimeters (1.6–10.6 by 1.2–3.7 in) with rounded to pointed bases and pointed to tapering tips. The upper side of the leaves are glossy and hairless, while the undersides are covered in sparse, fine hairs. The leaves have 8–16 pairs of secondary veins emanating from their midribs. Its petioles are 4–13.5 by 1–3 millimeters and covered in sparse, fine hairs. The 3 or more flowers occur on woody rachises positioned opposite leaves. The rachises have 3–8 branches. Flowers are attached to the rachis by fleshy, densely hairy pedicels that are 5–12.5 by 0.6–1 millimeters. The pedicels have an oval, basal bract that is 2–2.5 by 1–2 millimeters, and another upper bract that is 1.5–3.5 by 1.5–4 millimeters. Its flowers have 3 triangular sepals that are 2–3.5 by 2.5–4 millimeters. The sepals are covered in dense, fine, rust-colored hairs on their outer surface and are hairless or covered in sparse hairs on their inner surface. Its 6 petals are arranged in two rows of 3. The outer petals are initially pale chartreuse with orange lines, turning pinkish at maturity. The oval to lance-shaped, outer petals are 7.5–13.5 by 4.5–11 millimeters and come to a point at their tips. The edges of the outer petals become slightly wavy at maturity. The outer petals are covered in dense, brown, fine hairs on their outer surface and are sparsely hairy inside. The inner petals are 5–10 by 2–5.5 millimeters with a basal claw. The inner petals are pale yellow with purple lines. The inner petals have sparse, fine hairs on their outer surface woolly hairs near the tip of their inner surface. Its flowers have numerous stamen that are 1–1.2 by 0.5–06 millimeters. The stamen are arranged in a spiral. Its flowers have 10–12 carpels that are 1.5–1.7 by 0.5–0.6 millimeters. The carpels have 8–12 ovules. Its fruit occur in clusters of up to 8–12 on woody pedicels that are 25 by 4.5–6 millimeters and covered in sparse, fine hairs. The smooth, sparsely hairy, oval fruit are 1.8–4.8 by 1.1–4.5 centimeters. Each fruit has 6–12 seeds that are 15–17 by 5–10 millimeters.

=== Reproductive biology ===
The pollen of M. macrocarpa is shed as permanent tetrads.

== Habitat and distribution ==
It has been observed growing in lowland rain forests, at elevations of 50 to 400 meters (160 to 1,310 ft).
