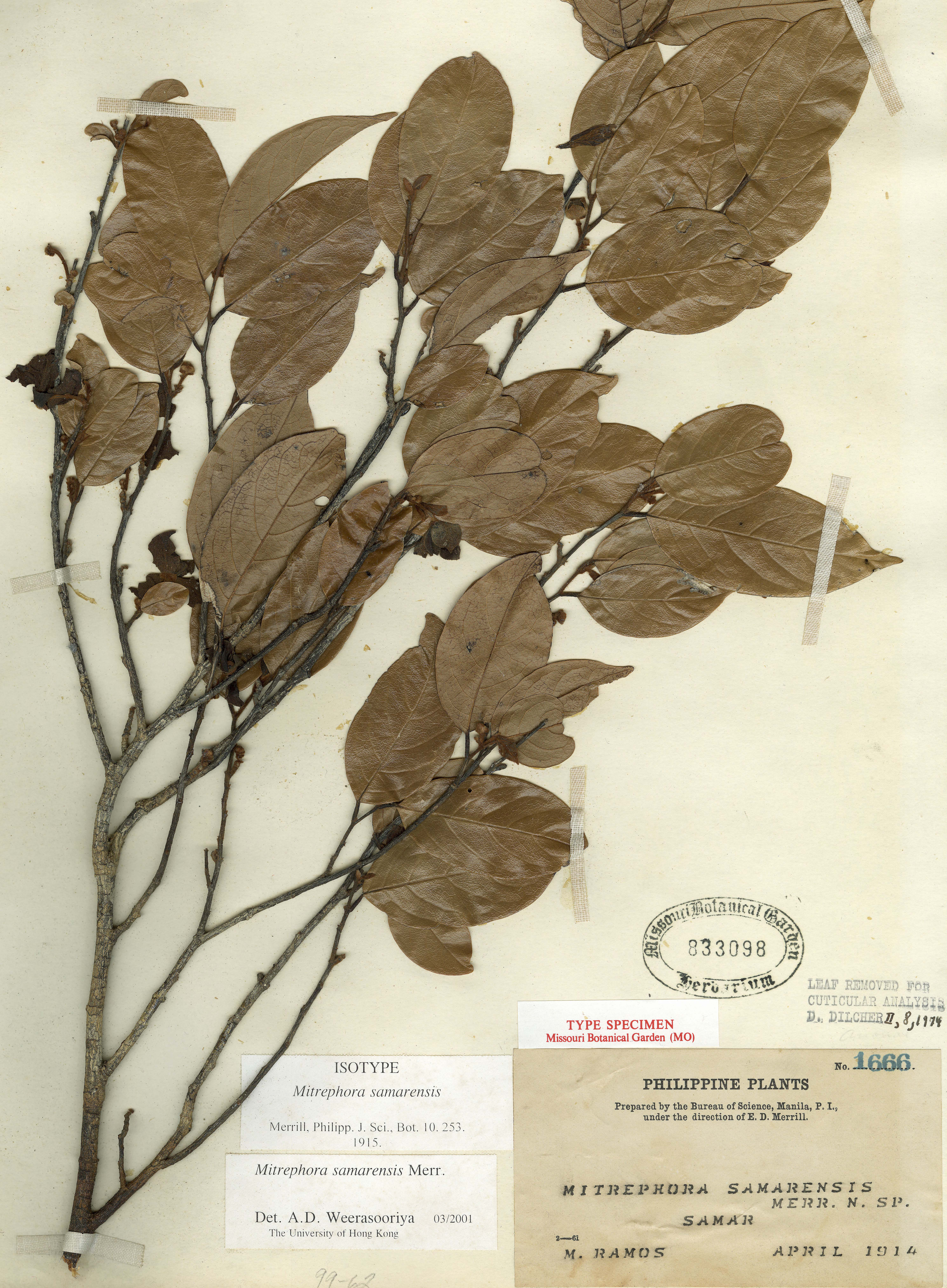
- Photograph of an herbarium specimen of Mitrephora samarensis

Conservation status
- Endangered (IUCN 3.1)

Scientific classification
- Kingdom: Plantae
- Clade: Embryophytes
- Clade: Tracheophytes
- Clade: Spermatophytes
- Clade: Angiosperms
- Clade: Magnoliids
- Order: Magnoliales
- Family: Annonaceae
- Genus: Mitrephora
- Species: M. samarensis

Binomial name
- Mitrephora samarensis Merr.

= Mitrephora samarensis =

Species of plant in the soursop family

Mitrephora samarensis is a species of plant in the family Annonaceae. It is native to the Philippines. Elmer Drew Merrill, the American botanist who first formally described the species, named it after Samar, the third largest island in the Philippines, where the sample he examined was collected.

== Description ==
It is a tree reaching 12–12 meters in height. Its leaves are 6–10 by 2–4 centimeters and come to a point at their tips. The leaves are smooth and shiny on both surfaces. Its petioles are 5 millimeters long. Its flowers are arranged in groups of 1–2 or fewer on a rachis. Each flower is on a fleshy, densely hairy pedicel 1–1.5 centimeters long. Its flowers have 3, leathery, oval-shaped sepals. Its 6 petals are arranged in two rows of 3. The outer petals are 6 by 11 millimeters. They are yellow and orange with red highlights and have wavy margins. Their outer surface is hairy, while their inner surface is smooth. The inner petals are 12 millimeters long. Its stamens are 1 millimeter long. Each flower has as many as 12 carpels that are 1 millimeter long and hairy. Each carpel has about 4 ovules.

=== Reproductive biology ===
The pollen of M. samarensis is shed as permanent tetrads.
