= Mitrephora fragrans =

Conservation status
- Vulnerable (IUCN 3.1)

Scientific classification
- Kingdom: Plantae
- Clade: Embryophytes
- Clade: Tracheophytes
- Clade: Spermatophytes
- Clade: Angiosperms
- Clade: Magnoliids
- Order: Magnoliales
- Family: Annonaceae
- Genus: Mitrephora
- Species: M. fragrans

Binomial name
- Mitrephora fragrans Merr.

Species of flowering plant

Mitrephora fragrans is a species of plant in the family Annonaceae. It is native to Borneo and the Philippines. Elmer Drew Merrill, the American botanist who first formally described the species, named it after its large, fragrant (fragrans in Latin) flowers.

== Description ==
It is a tree reaching 8 to 10 meters (26 to 33 ft) in height. Its leathery leaves are 10–26 by 5–11 centimeters (3.9–10.2 by 2.0–4.3 in) and have rounded or slightly pointed tips. Its fragrant flowers are solitary and yellow to orange. Its sepals are oval to oblong and 10–14 millimeters in length. Its mature outer petals are 5.5 by 4 centimeters, oblong and come to a point at their tip. The outside surface of the outer petals is hairy. Its inner petals have purple highlights, are 3 centimeters long and have an arched shape. The inside surface of the inner petals is hairy. It has numerous stamens that are 1.5 millimeters long. Its flowers have up to 10 carpels. Its carpels have 16–20 ovules.

=== Reproductive biology ===
The pollen of M. fragrans is shed as permanent tetrads.
