= Mitrephora amdjahii =

Conservation status
- Vulnerable (IUCN 3.1)

Scientific classification
- Kingdom: Plantae
- Clade: Tracheophytes
- Clade: Angiosperms
- Clade: Magnoliids
- Order: Magnoliales
- Family: Annonaceae
- Genus: Mitrephora
- Species: M. amdjahii

Binomial name
- Mitrephora amdjahii Weeras. & R.M.K.Saunders

Species of flowering plant

Mitrephora amdjahii is a species of tree in the Annonaceae family. It is a small tree endemic to Borneo, where it is known from Sabah and Kalimantan. It grows in primary lowland rain forest, often near rivers.
