= Mitrephora lanotan =

Conservation status
- Near Threatened (IUCN 3.1)

Scientific classification
- Kingdom: Plantae
- Clade: Embryophytes
- Clade: Tracheophytes
- Clade: Spermatophytes
- Clade: Angiosperms
- Clade: Magnoliids
- Order: Magnoliales
- Family: Annonaceae
- Genus: Mitrephora
- Species: M. lanotan

Binomial name
- Mitrephora lanotan (Blanco) Merr.

Synonyms
- Mitrephora caudata Merr. Uvaria lanotan Blanco

Species of plant in the soursop family

Mitrephora lanotan is a species of plant in the family Annonaceae. It is a tree endemic to the Philippines.
