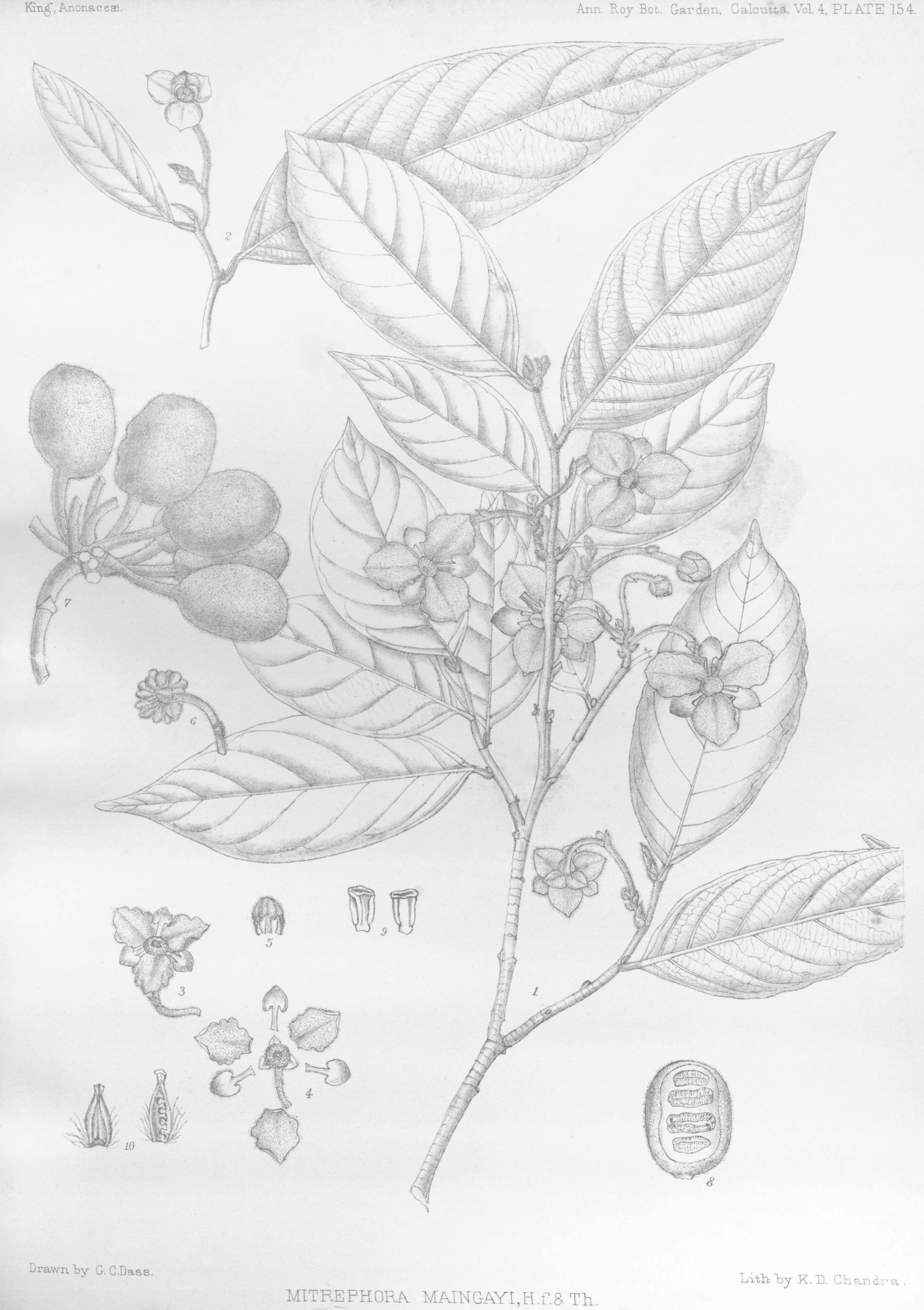
- Botanical illustration of Mitrephora maingayi

Scientific classification
- Kingdom: Plantae
- Clade: Tracheophytes
- Clade: Angiosperms
- Clade: Magnoliids
- Order: Magnoliales
- Family: Annonaceae
- Genus: Mitrephora
- Species: M. maingayi

Binomial name
- Mitrephora maingayi Hook.f. & Thomson

Synonyms
- Kinginda maingayi (Hook.f. & Thomson) Kuntze; Mitrephora teysmannii Scheff. Mitrephora vandiflora Kurz

= Mitrephora maingayi =

Species of plant in the soursop family

Mitrephora maingayi is a species of plant in the family Annonaceae. It is native to Bangladesh, Borneo, Cambodia, Laos, Peninsular Malaysia, Myanmar, Sumatra, and Vietnam. Joseph Hooker and Thomas Thomson, the British botanists who first formally described the species, named it in honor of Alexander Carroll Maingay, the British botanist who collected the specimen they examined.

== Description ==
It is a tree reaching 20 meters (66 ft) in height. Its papery, oval to lance-shaped leaves are 5–21.5 by 1.5–9.6 centimeters. The leaves have pointed or short tapering tips and shallowly angled or rounded bases. The leaves, except for the midribs, are hairless and shiny on their upper surfaces and hairless or sparsely hairy on their undersides. The leaves have 5–13 pairs of secondary veins emanating from their midribs. Its petioles are 5–14 by 1–3 millimeters. Its inflorescences are composed of up to 3 flowers positioned opposite from leaves. Each flower is born on a pedicel that is 10–70 by 1 millimeters and densely covered in fine brown hairs. Oval bracts at the base of pedicels are 2–4 by 1.5–3 millimeters while middle bracts are 1.5–4 by 1.4–4 millimeters. Its oval sepals are 1.5–4 by 2–5.5 millimeters. The outer surfaces of the sepals have dense, brown hairs; the inner surfaces are hairless. Its flowers have 6 petals in two rows of three. The oval to elliptical outer petals are 10–35 by 7–17 millimeters with pointed tips and wavy margins when mature. The outer surfaces of the outer petals have pale hairs; the inner surfaces have short curly hairs near their tips. The outer petals are yellow with red highlights. The inner petals are 6–13 by 3–9 millimeters and yellow with red highlights. The inner petals have a 2 millimeter-wide basal claw below a heart-shaped blade. The outer surfaces of the inner petals are covered in short pale hairs; the inner surfaces are covered in long brown hairs near their tips. Its flowers have numerous oblong stamen that are 1 millimeter long. Its flowers have up to 10–15 carpels that are 1 millimeter long. Its fruit are found in clusters of 5–15. The round to elliptical, fruit are 1–3 by 1–2.5 centimeters. The fruit have dense, short pale hair and longer, sparser brown hairs. The fruit are born on 5–30 by 1.5–4 millimeter stipes that have dense, short pale hair and longer, sparser brown hairs. The stipes are attached to a pedicels that is 15–40 by 3.5–4 millimeters and sparsely covered in hairs. The fruit have 4–8 seeds that are 6 by 10 millimeters.

=== Reproductive biology ===
Using the synonymous name, Mitrephora teysmannii, Yunyun Shao and Fengxia Xu report that the pollen of M. maingayi is shed as permanent tetrads.

== Habitat and distribution ==
It has been observed growing in lowlands or lower mountainous habitats at elevations up to 1,200 meters (3,900 ft).

== Uses ==
Mitregenin, an acetogenin, has been isolated from its leaves and twigs. Several members of the acetogenin family of compounds have neurotoxic activity.
