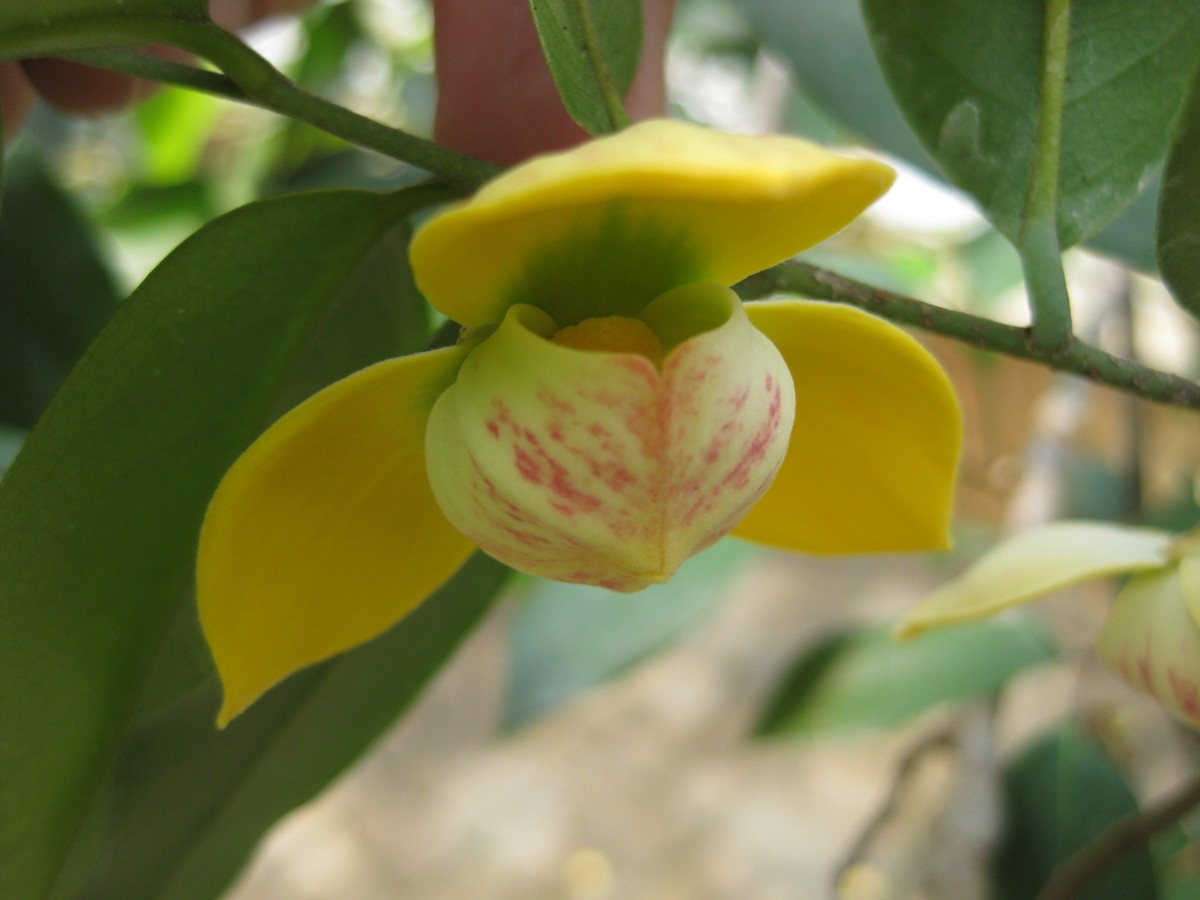

Conservation status
- Near Threatened (IUCN 3.1)

Scientific classification
- Kingdom: Plantae
- Clade: Embryophytes
- Clade: Tracheophytes
- Clade: Spermatophytes
- Clade: Angiosperms
- Clade: Magnoliids
- Order: Magnoliales
- Family: Annonaceae
- Genus: Mitrephora
- Species: M. keithii

Binomial name
- Mitrephora keithii Ridl.

Synonyms
- Mitrephora lophophora C.E.C.Fisch.

= Mitrephora keithii =

Species of plant in the soursop family

Mitrephora keithii is a species of flowering plant in the family Annonaceae. It is native to Myanmar, Peninsular Malaysia, and Thailand. Henry Nicholas Ridley, the English botanist who first formally described the species, named it in honor of Dr. A. Keith who collected the sample that Ridley examined.

== Description ==
It is a small tree reaching 6 meters (20 ft) in height. Its leathery, oval to lance-shaped leaves are 7.5–17.5 by 2.5–5 centimeters (3.0–6.9 by 1.0–2.0 in) with pointed bases tips. The upper side of the leaves are matt and hairless, while the undersides are covered in sparse, fine hairs. The leaves have 7–11 pairs of secondary veins emanating from their midribs. Its petioles are 3–8.5 by 1.5–3 millimeters and covered in sparse, fine hairs. The flowers occur in groups of 3 or fewer on a rachis. Flowers are attached to the rachis by fleshy, densely hairy pedicels that are 4.5–9 by 0.8–1.5 millimeters. The pedicels have an oval, basal bract that is 1.5 by 2 millimeters, and another upper bract that is 1–2.5 by 1.5–2.5 millimeters. Its flowers have 3 triangular sepals that are 3–4 by 3–4.5 millimeters. The sepals are covered in dense, brown hairs on their outer surface and sparse hairs on their inner surface. Its 6 petals are arranged in two rows of 3. The yellow, oval, outer petals are 9–18 by 6.5–9.5 millimeters and come to a point at their tips. The outer surface of the outer petals is covered in dense, brown, fine hairs while the inner surface is sparsely hairy. The edges of the outer petals are slightly wavy when mature. The inner petals are yellow with pink edges. The inner petals are 7.5–10 by 4.5–6 millimeters. The inner petals have dense, fine hairs on their outer surface. The inner surface of inner petals is covered in hairs that become longer at the tip. Its flowers have stamen that are 1–1.2 by 0.5–0.8 millimeters. Its flowers have 12–14 carpels that are 1.5–1.8 by 0.5–0.8 millimeters. The carpels have 6–12 ovules. Its fruit occur in clusters of 4–6 on pedicels that are 10 by 2 millimeters and covered in sparse, fine hairs. The smooth, sparsely hairy, oblong fruit are 14–30 by 7.5 millimeters. The fruit are attached to the pedicel by stipes that are 3–3.5 by 2 millimeters and covered in sparse, grey-brown, fine hairs. Each fruit has 4–12 seeds that are 8.5–14 by 7.5 millimeters.

=== Reproductive biology ===
The pollen of M. keithii is shed as permanent tetrads.

== Habitat and distribution ==
It has been observed growing in evergreen forests with limestone soil at elevations of 0 to 300 meters (980 ft).
