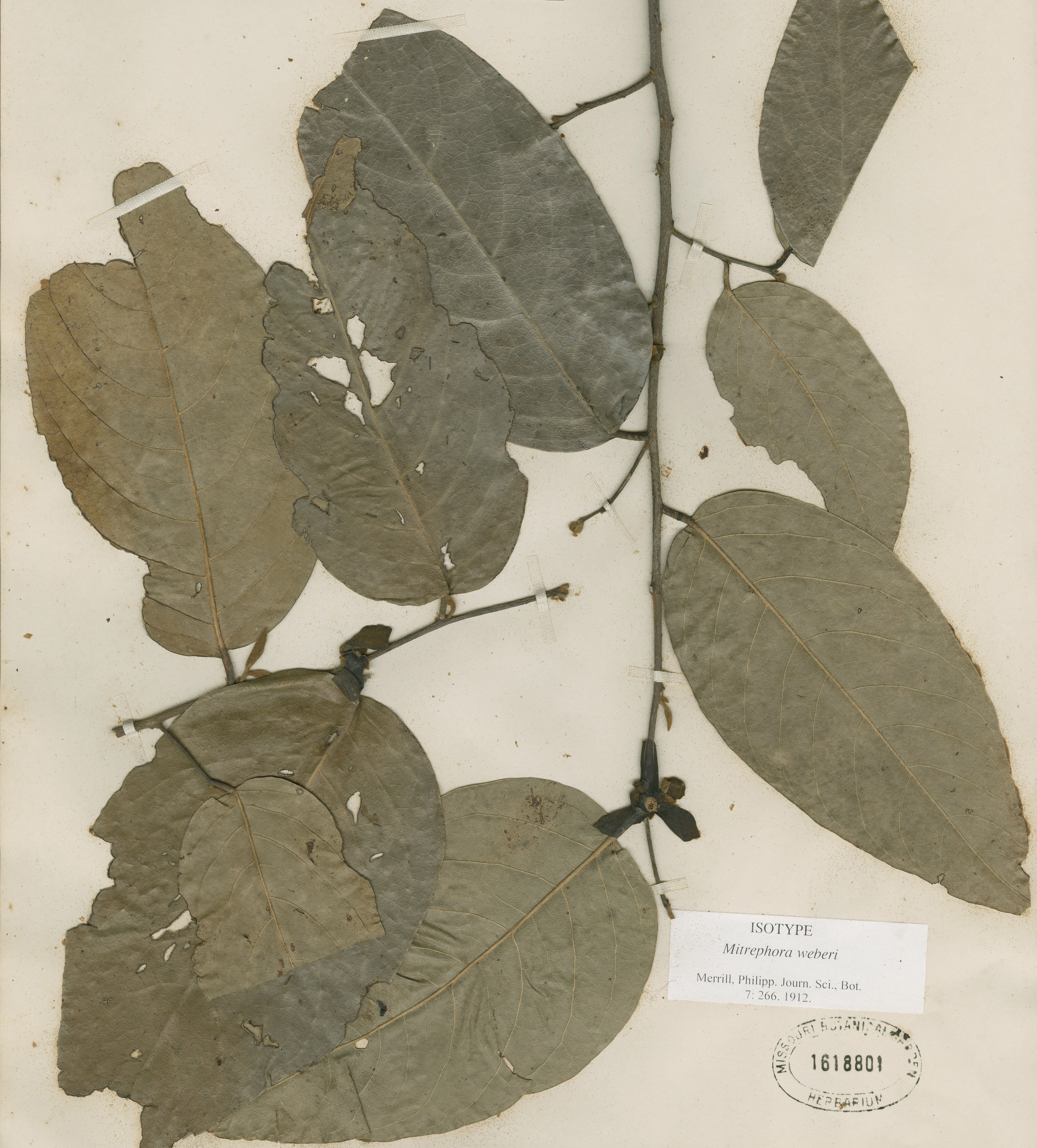
- Photograph of an herbarium specimen of Mitrephora weberi

Conservation status
- Endangered (IUCN 3.1)

Scientific classification
- Kingdom: Plantae
- Clade: Embryophytes
- Clade: Tracheophytes
- Clade: Spermatophytes
- Clade: Angiosperms
- Clade: Magnoliids
- Order: Magnoliales
- Family: Annonaceae
- Genus: Mitrephora
- Species: M. weberi

Binomial name
- Mitrephora weberi Merr.

= Mitrephora weberi =

Species of plant in the soursop family

Mitrephora weberi is a species of plant in the family Annonaceae. It is native to the Philippines. Elmer Drew Merrill, an American botanist, first formally described the species and named it after Charles Martin Weber who collected the specimen that Merrill examined.

== Description ==
Mitrephora weberi is a tree that can reach 8 meters (26 ft) in height. Its branches have lenticels. Its slightly leathery leaves are 10–18 by 4–8 centimeters (3.9–7.1 by 1.6–3.1 in). The leaves are smooth and shiny green on both surfaces. Its petioles are 7–10 millimeters long. Its flowers are yellow with purple highlights. Its flowers have 3, oval-shaped sepals, 6 millimeters long, that come to a point at their tip. Its 6 petals are arranged in two rows of 3. The outer petals are 20 by 8 millimeters, hairy on their outer surface and smooth inside. The inner petals are 14 millimeters long and densely hairy on their inner surface. Its stamens are 1–1.2 millimeters long. Each flower has 12–15 ovaries that are smooth and 1–1.2 millimeters long. Each ovary has about 12 ovules.

=== Reproductive biology ===
The pollen of M. weberi is shed as permanent tetrads.

== Habitat and distribution ==
It has been observed growing in forests with limestone soils at elevations up to 30 meters (98 ft).
