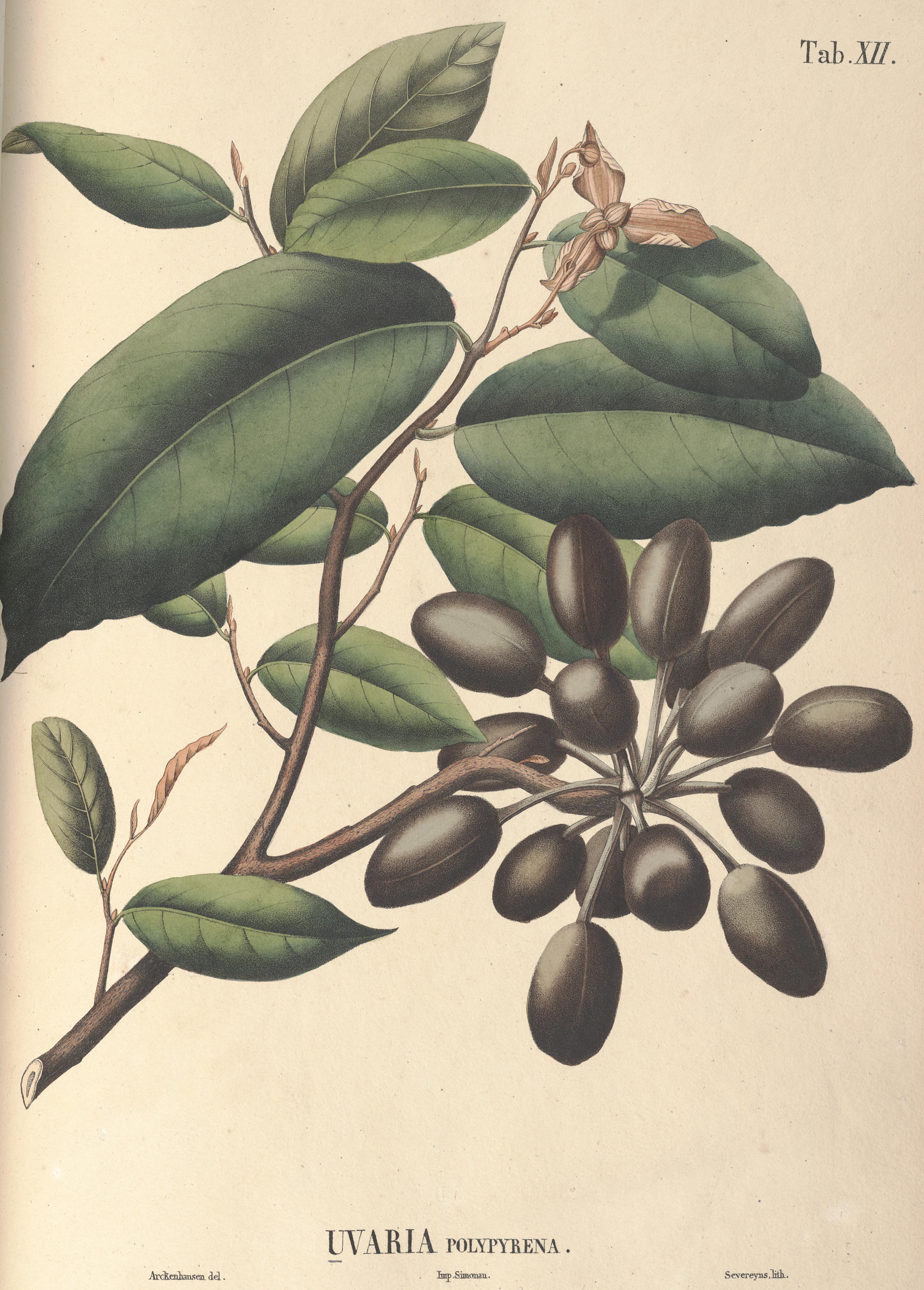
- Color illustration of Mitrephora polypyrena under basionym Uvaria polypyrene

Conservation status
- Vulnerable (IUCN 3.1)

Scientific classification
- Kingdom: Plantae
- Clade: Embryophytes
- Clade: Tracheophytes
- Clade: Spermatophytes
- Clade: Angiosperms
- Clade: Magnoliids
- Order: Magnoliales
- Family: Annonaceae
- Genus: Mitrephora
- Species: M. polypyrena

Binomial name
- Mitrephora polypyrena (Blume) Zoll.

Synonyms
- Kinginda macrantha (Hassk.) Kuntze; Kinginda polypyrena (Blume) Kuntze; Mitrephora javanica Backer; Mitrephora macrantha Hassk.; Uvaria polypyrena Blume

= Mitrephora polypyrena =

Species of plant in the soursop family

Mitrephora polypyrena is a species of flowering plant in the family Annonaceae. It is a tree native to Java, Bali, and Myanmar. Carl Ludwig Blume, the German botanist who first formally described the species using the basionym Uvaria polypyrena, named it after the many stones or seeds (Latinized forms of Greek πολυ-, poly-, and πυρην, pyren) in its fruit.

== Description ==
It is a tree reaching 20 meters (66 ft) in height. Its oval to lance-shaped, leathery leaves are 8–22.5 by 3.5–9 centimeters (3.1–8.9 by 1.4–3.5 in) and come to a point at their tips. The leaves are smooth and shiny on their upper surfaces, while their undersides are slightly hairy. Its petioles are 4.5–11 by 1.5–3.5 millimeters. Its flowers are arranged in groups of 3 or fewer on a rachis. Each flower is on a fleshy, slightly hairy pedicel that is 1.1–1.6 by 20–40 millimeters. The pedicels have an oval, basal bract that is 4–4.5 by 2.5–4.5 millimeters, and another oval, upper bract that is 3.5–5.5 by 4.5–7 millimeters. Its flowers have 3, oval-shaped sepals that are 5–7.5 by 5.5–7.5 millimeters. The outside of the sepals are densely hairy, while their inner surfaces are smooth. Its 6 petals are arranged in two rows of 3. The yellow, oval-shaped outer petals are 24–36 by 18–28 millimeters and come to a point at their tip. The outside surface of the outer petals are densely hairy, while their inner surface is slightly hairy. The inner petals are white with reddish-purple highlights and 17–22 by 9.5–16 millimeters. The outside surface of the inner petals is densely hairy while the tip of the inner surface has long hairs. Its flowers have more than numerous stamen that are 1.5–1.7 by 0.5–0.6 millimeters. Its flowers have up to 24–26 free carpels that are 2–2.2 by 0.5–0.6 millimeters. The carpels have 12–14 ovules. Its fruit occur in clusters of up to 9–12 on pedicels that are 19–34 by 3–5 millimeters and covered in sparse, fine hairs. The round to oblong, smooth fruit are 19–31 by 8–17 millimeters. The fruit have a longitudinal ridge and are sparsely covered in fine brown hairs. The fruit are attached to the pedicel by stipes that are 12–21 by 2.5–4 millimeters and sparsely covered in fine brown hairs. Each fruit has 12–14 seeds that are 15–17 by 8–9.5 millimeters.

=== Reproductive biology ===
The pollen of M. polypyrena is shed as permanent tetrads.

=== Habitat and Distribution ===
It has been observed growing in wet evergreen forests, at elevations of 300 to 700 meters (980 to 2,300 ft).

=== Uses ===
It is used as timber and cultivated as a cover crop and ornamental species.
