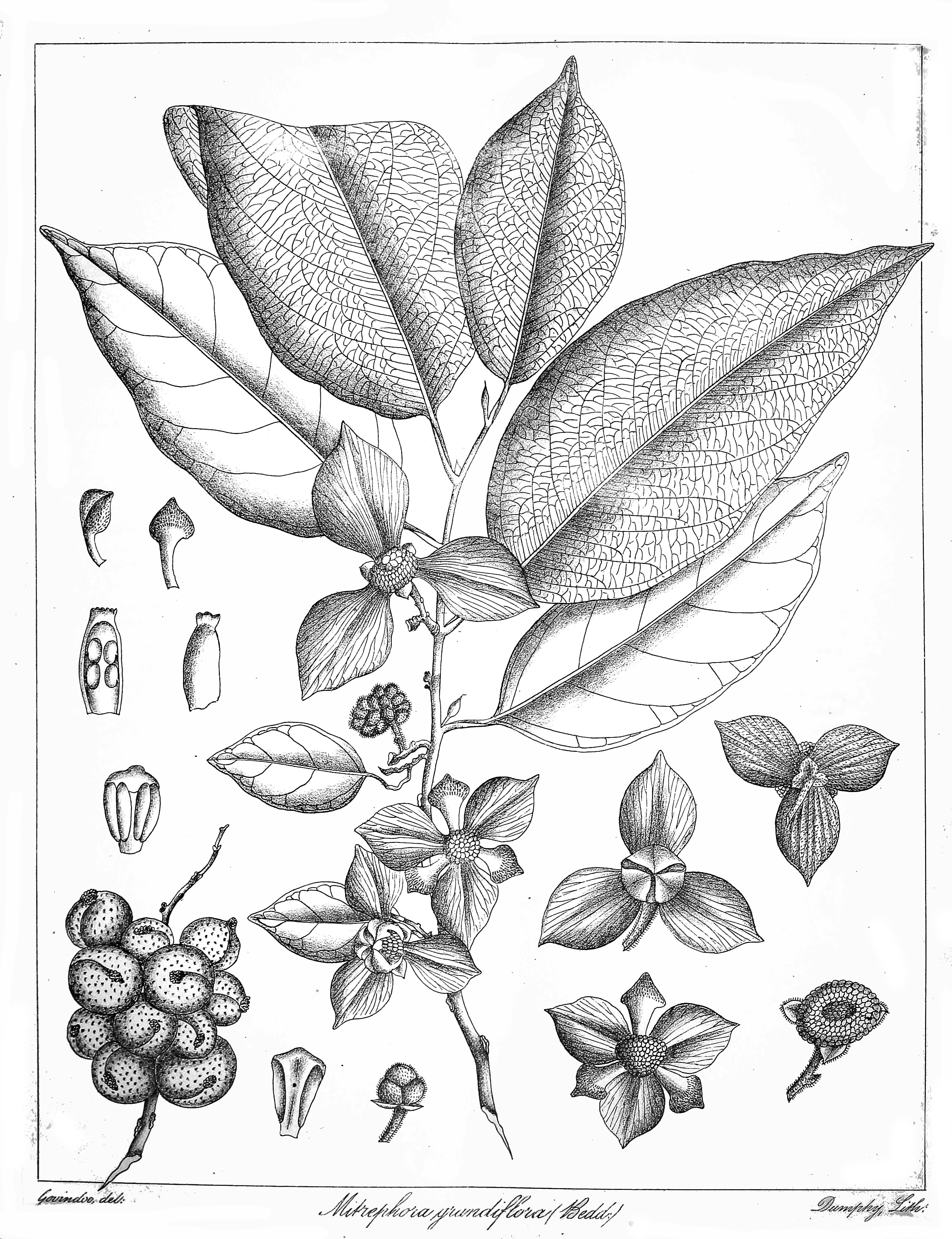

Conservation status
- Vulnerable (IUCN 2.3)

Scientific classification
- Kingdom: Plantae
- Clade: Embryophytes
- Clade: Tracheophytes
- Clade: Spermatophytes
- Clade: Angiosperms
- Clade: Magnoliids
- Order: Magnoliales
- Family: Annonaceae
- Genus: Mitrephora
- Species: M. grandiflora

Binomial name
- Mitrephora grandiflora Bedd.

Synonyms
- Kinginda grandiflora (Bedd.) Kuntze

= Mitrephora grandiflora =

Species of flowering plant

Mitrephora grandiflora is a species of flowering plant in the family Annonaceae. It is a tree native to the Western Ghats of Karnataka and Kerala in southwestern India.

== Description ==
It is a medium-sized tree with alternate tomentose leaves. White to yellow colored flowers are seen solitary or 2–3 in leaf opposed cymes. It produces fruits of one to two seeded berries.

== Phenology ==
The plant flowers and fruits from January to April.
