= Mitrephora wangii =

Conservation status
- Near Threatened (IUCN 3.1)

Scientific classification
- Kingdom: Plantae
- Clade: Embryophytes
- Clade: Tracheophytes
- Clade: Spermatophytes
- Clade: Angiosperms
- Clade: Magnoliids
- Order: Magnoliales
- Family: Annonaceae
- Genus: Mitrephora
- Species: M. wangii

Binomial name
- Mitrephora wangii Hu

Species of plant in the soursop family

Mitrephora wangii is a species of flowering plant in the family Annonaceae. It is a tree native to Yunnan and Thailand.

== Description ==
It is a tree reaching 10 meters (33 ft) in height. Its young branches are densely covered in hairs. Its leathery, oblong to lance-shaped leaves are 10.5–27 by 3.5–8 centimeters (4.1–10.6 by 1.4–3.1 in). The leaves have tips that taper to a point and wedge-shaped bases. The leaves are hairless on their upper surfaces and sparsely covered in hair underneath. The leaves have 10–14 pairs of secondary veins emanating from their midribs. Its petioles are 6.5–11.5 millimeters and sparsely covered in hairs. Its inflorescences are organized as unbranched rachides. Each flower is born on a pedicel that is 1.2–1.7 centimeters long. Bracts on the pedicels are 1.5–2 by 1–1.5 millimeters. Its oval sepals are 3–3.5 by 3–4.5 millimeters. Its flowers have 6 petals in two rows of three. The yellow, oval outer petals are 1.6–2.3 by 1–1.9 centimeters with somewhat wavy margins when mature. The purplish inner petals are 1.1–1.9 by 0.6–1.3 centimeters. Its flowers have numerous yellow, hairless stamen that are 0.8–1 millimeter. Its flowers have up to 8–10 carpels that are 1.8–2 millimeters. The carpels have 6–8 ovules. Its oblong fruit are 2.4–3.8 by 1.4–2.6 centimeters. The fruit are sparsely covered in hair. The fruit are born on 0.9–1.3 centimeter stipes. The stipes are attached to 1–1.6 centimeter pedicels. The seeds are 9 by 6 millimeters.

=== Reproductive biology ===
The pollen of M. wangii is shed as permanent tetrads.
