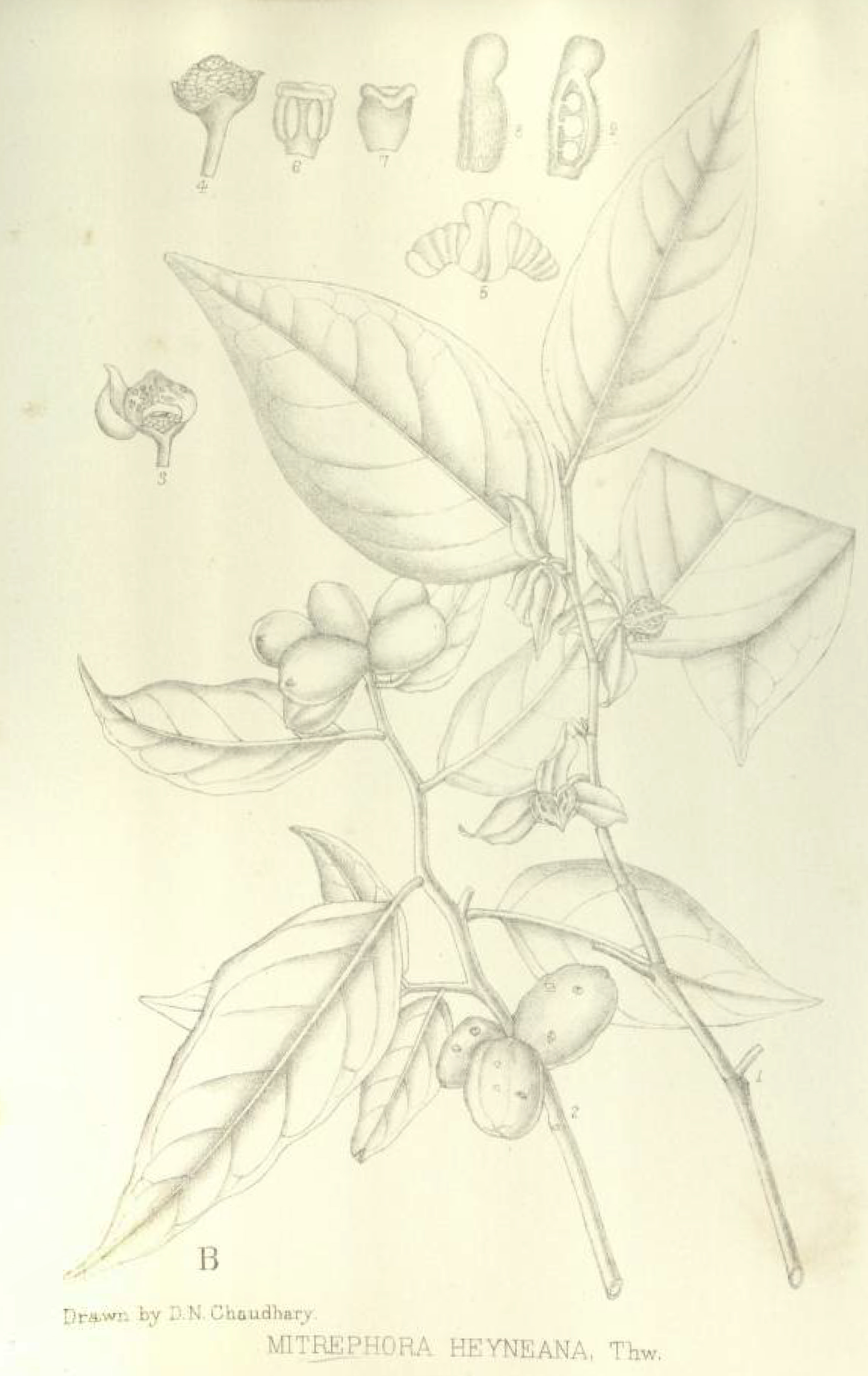
- Botanical illustration of Mitrephora heyneana

Conservation status
- Least Concern (IUCN 3.1)

Scientific classification
- Kingdom: Plantae
- Clade: Embryophytes
- Clade: Tracheophytes
- Clade: Spermatophytes
- Clade: Angiosperms
- Clade: Magnoliids
- Order: Magnoliales
- Family: Annonaceae
- Genus: Mitrephora
- Species: M. heyneana

Binomial name
- Mitrephora heyneana (Hook.f. & Thomson) Thwaites

Synonyms
- Kinginda heyneana Kuntze; Orophea heyneana Hook.f. & Thomson; Uvaria heyneana Wall.

= Mitrephora heyneana =

Species of plant in the soursop family

Mitrephora heyneana is a species of flowering plant in the family Annonaceae. It is native to southwestern India and Sri Lanka. Joseph Dalton Hooker and Thomas Thomson, the British botanists who first formally described the species under the basionym Orophea heyneana, named it after Benjamin Heyne a German botanist who collected and described many plant species from India.

== Description ==
It is a tree reaching 12 meters (39 ft) in height. Its leathery, oval to lance-shaped leaves are 3–11.5 by 2–4.5 centimeters (1.2–4.5 by 0.8–1.8 in) with pointed or rounded bases and pointed to tapering tips. The upper side of the leaves are matt and hairless, while the undersides are covered in sparse, fine hairs. The leaves have 6–10 pairs of secondary veins emanating from their midribs. Its petioles are 3–7 by 1.2 millimeters and covered in sparse, fine hairs. The flowers are on fleshy, densely hairy pedicels that are 2.5–5 by 0.5–0.9 millimeters. The pedicels have an oval, basal bract that is 1 by 1 millimeters, and another upper bract that is 1–1.5 by 1–2 millimeters. Its flowers have 3 oval sepals that are 1.5–2 by 2–2.5 millimeters. The sepals are covered in dense, brown hairs on their outer surface and sparse hairs on their inner surface. Its 6 petals are arranged in two rows of 3. The yellow, oval to lance-shaped, outer petals are 7–14 by 2.5–6 millimeters and come to a point at their tips. The outer surface of the outer petals are covered in dense, brown, fine hairs while the inner surface is sparsely hairy. The margins of the outer petals are slightly wavy when mature. The inner petals are yellow with red to purple stripes. The inner petals are 6.5–8.5 by 4.5–6.5 millimeters. The inner petals have dense, fine hairs on their outer surface. The inner surface of inner petals is covered in glandular hairs that become longer at the tip and cause the petals to interlock to form a dome. Its flowers have stamen that are 0.4–0.7 by 0.4–0.6 millimeters. Its flowers have 9–10 carpels that are 0.9–1.4 by 0.4–0.5 millimeters. The carpels have 4–6 ovules. Its fruit occur in clusters of 4–9 on pedicels that are 3–7.5 by 0.5–1.5 millimeters and covered in sparse, fine hairs. The smooth, densely hairy, oval fruit are 14–12 by 2.5–9 millimeters with flat tips. The fruit are attached to the pedicel by stipes that are 1–2 by 1–1.5 millimeters and covered in dense, brown, fine hairs. Each fruit has 2–4 seeds that are 8.5–10 by 7–9 millimeters.

=== Reproductive biology ===
The pollen of M. heyneana is shed as permanent tetrads. Pollination is believed to be assisted by beetles in the Nitidulidae family.

== Habitat and distribution ==
It has been observed growing in rocky forests, at elevations of 200 to 450 meters (660 to 1,480 ft).

== Uses ==
The bioactive molecule betulin extracted from its bark has been shown to inhibit the growth of cultured human tumor cells.
