= Charles Budd Robinson =

Canadian botanist and explorer (1871–1913)

Charles Budd Robinson, Jr. (October 26, 1871 – December 5, 1913) was a Canadian botanist and explorer. The standard author abbreviation C.B.Rob. is used to indicate this individual as the author when citing a botanical name.

== Early life ==
Born in Nova Scotia to Charles Budd and Frances Robinson, Robinson gained his degree from Dalhousie University in 1891 before taking up teaching posts in Kentville and Pictou. He received his doctorate from Columbia University in 1906. Robinson worked with the New York Botanical Garden (NYBG) from 1903 to 1908, leaving to become an economic botanist with the Bureau of Science in Manila and working together with Elmer Drew Merrill. After a brief return to NYBG in 1911, he went back to Manila to continue his research. In 1913 he was on a long field trip in Indonesia (formerly called Amboina), collecting plant specimens as done by Georg Eberhard Rumphius more than 170 years before. The result was an exsiccata-like specimen series entitled C. B. Rogerson: Plantae Rumphianae Amboinenses.

== Death ==
Robinson never returned after leaving on a botanical expedition to the Maluku Islands on December 5, 1913. He was reported as missing on December 11, with the assistant resident of Amboina (now Ambon in Indonesia) writing about the nature of his disappearance. He concluded that Robinson had been murdered. The report states that Robinson had encountered a native boy who had climbed a coconut tree, startling the boy who was not used to seeing a "European". The boy hurried to his village whereupon the locals feared that Robinson intended to do them harm, possibly believing him to be a head-hunter. Six people from the village killed him and sank his body into the sea. The natives from the village have been described as "binongkos", a band of Sea Gypsies who lived in the Maluku Islands. In Robinson's obituary it was written that he was "struck down by the hands of ignorant and savage natives" while "in the peaceful pursuit of his profession and in his zealous endeavors to augment the sum of human knowledge".

Robinson's death may have been caused by linguistic confusion, as he was known to speak the local language quite poorly. The Malay word for coconut, "kelapa", may have been confused with "kepala", the word for "head". If Robinson asked the boy to cut, "potong", down a coconut it may have been mispronounced and heard as a threat to cut off someone's head. There was a local myth of a werewolf-like decapitator called a "potong kepala" and it is speculated Robinson was mistaken for one.

== See also ==
- List of unsolved murders (1900–1979)

== Noted publications ==
- 1903 Contributions to a flora of Nova Scotia
- 1906 The Chareae of North America
- 1909 Philippine Boraginaceae
- 1910 Philippine Urticaceae. The Philippine journal of science. C. Botany
- 1911 Alabastra Philippinensia
- 1912 Polycodium. Contributions from the New York Botanical Garden
