= Johan Baptist Spanoghe =

Dutch botanist (1798–1838)

- Born: 1798; Madras Presidency, British India
- Died: 22 April 1838 (aged 39–40); Pekalongan, Java, Dutch East Indies
- Known for: Botanical collecting in the Dutch East Indies
- Scientific career
- Fields: Botany
- Workplaces: Dutch East Indies government
- Author abbrev. (botany): Span.

Johan Baptist Spanoghe (1798, Madras – 22 April 1838, Pekalongan, Java) was a Dutch botanical collector of Belgian parentage.

A native of Madras, then part of British India, he became a civil servant with the Dutch East Indies government in 1816. In 1821, he was named as an "assistant resident" for the southern divisions of the Bantam Residency in western Java. From 1831 to 1836, he was stationed on the island of Timor.

As a botanist in the East Indies, he collected plants in Java, Timor and neighboring islands, and also in Bali. The genus Spanoghea was named in his honor by Carl Ludwig Blume, who for a period of time, worked closely with Spanoghe in Java.

== Publications ==
- Prodromus Florae Timorensis, . 1838. (Linnaea, XV. 161–208, 314–350, 476–480. 1841).
