= Suzanne Jovet-Ast =

French botanist (1914-2006)

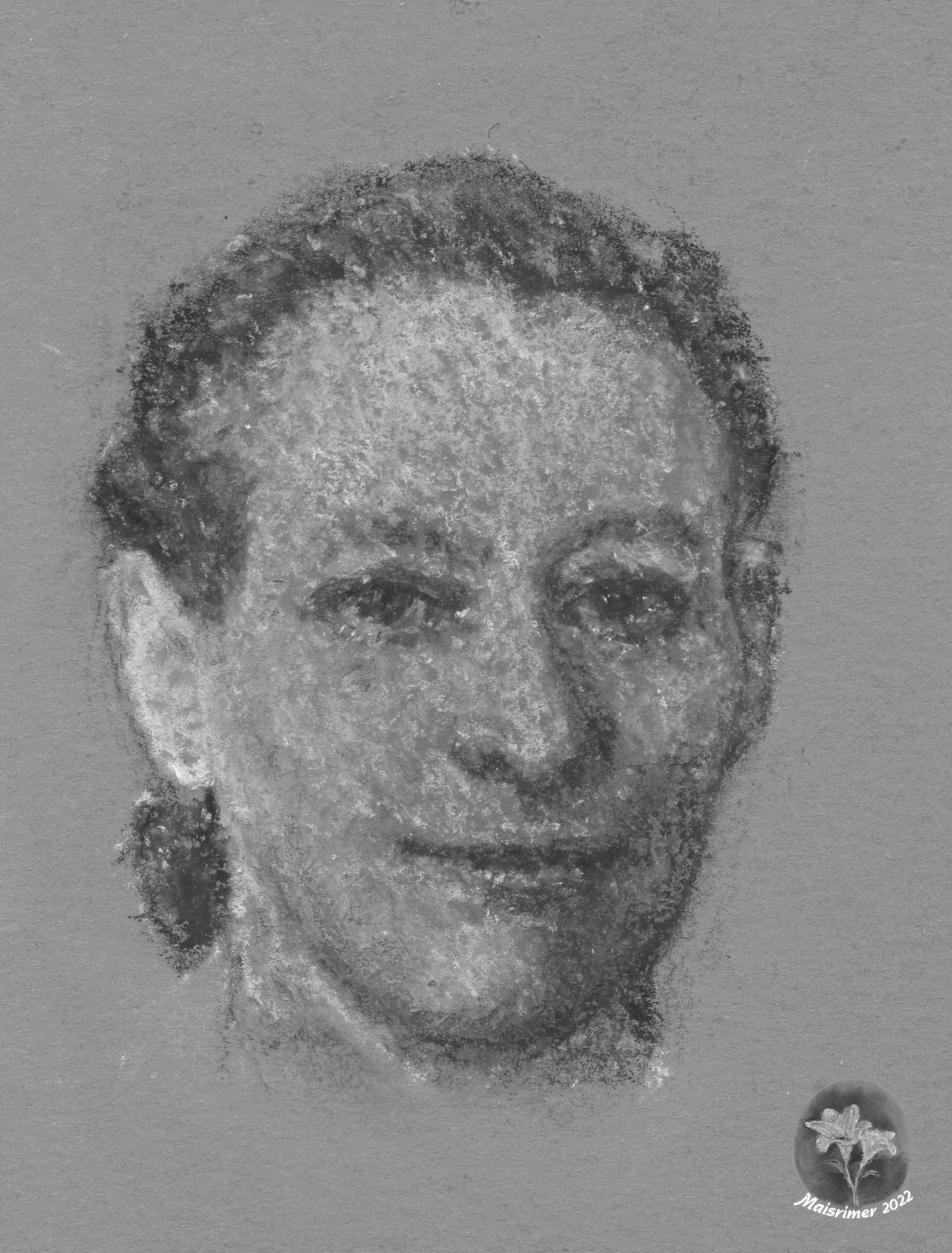
- Professor Suzanne Jovet-Ast in the 1950s
- Born: 8 February 1914; Paris, France
- Died: 22 February 2006 (aged 92); Biarritz, France
- Citizenship: France
- Education: Lycée Voltaire (Paris)
- Spouse: Paul Jovet
- Scientific career
- Fields: Botany and Bryology
- Workplaces: National Museum of Natural History, France and French National Centre for Scientific Research
- Author abbrev. (botany): Ast; Jovet-Ast

Suzanne Jovet-Ast (1914–2006) was a French botanist, who worked principally at the National Museum of Natural History, France.

== Life ==
Suzanne Ast was born in Paris, France, on 8 February 1914. She received her Baccalauréat (1932) from Lycée Voltaire (Paris).

In 1942, she was a preparer in the cryptogam ecology laboratory under the direction of Pierre Allorge. In 1943, she defended her doctoral thesis entitled Research on the Annonaceae of Indochina: leaf anatomy, geographical distribution, and she obtained her doctorate (1943) while working at the National Museum of Natural History. At the museum she met the French botanist Paul Jovet and they married In 1939.

=== Work ===
In 1945, she became assistant to the chair of Cryptogamy. The French Botanical Society awarded her the Coincy Prize in 1948. In 1957, Suzanne Jovet-Ast was deputy director at the chair of Cryptogamy where she succeeded Robert Lami. In 1975, she took over from Roger Heim as head of the Cryptogamy laboratory, becoming the first (and for a long time the only) female professor-administrator of the Museum, a position she held until her retirement.

She served as Cryptogamy Chair of the National Museum of Natural History. Together with Hélène Bischler-Causse she co-founded the Association des Amis des Cryptogames in 1975. In her early work she studied the flowering plant family Annonaceae, while the majority of her professional career was focused on Bryophytes.

In 1938, she wrote the chapter on Annonaceae for the General Flora of Indochina by François Gagnepain.

=== Research interests ===
In bryology, she studied liverworts, particularly those from tropical and then Mediterranean regions. In the 1960s, Hélène Bischler and Jovet-Ast studied liverworts in the Mediterranean basin and arid and semi-arid zones in the field, which gave rise to numerous publications and applications in biochemistry and pharmacy.

She retired in 1982 but continued collecting and working until her death on 22 February 2006 in Biarritz, France.

== Legacy ==
She is the authority for at least 35 taxa using the name Ast including: IPNI. List of plant names with authority Ast. and 25 using the name Jovet-Ast including: IPNI. List of plant names with authority Jovet-Ast.
