= Stinkwood =

Stinkwood, German Stinkholz, French Bois Puant, is the common name for a number of trees or shrubs which have wood or plant parts with an unpleasant odour, including:

- Anagyris foetida; Southern Europe
- Bignonia callistegioides (cipó d'alho); Southern Brasil
- Celtis africana (white stinkwood); native to South Africa
- Celtis mildbraedii (Natal white stinkwood, red-fruited white-stinkwood); native to Tropical Africa
- Celtis timorensis; native to South and Southeast Asia
- Coprosma foetidissima; native to New Zealand and extends south to the Auckland Islands
- Coprosma grandifolia; New Zealand
- Coprosma putida; endemic to Lord Howe Island
- Crateva tapia; (Páo, Pau or tapiá d'alho) Brasil to Central America
- Cryptocarya latifolia (bastard stinkwood); South Africa
- Dysoxylum alliaceum (German Knoblauchbaum); Southeast Asia
- Eucryphia moorei; Southeast Australia
- Fridericia elegans (cipó d'alho); Middle Eastern Brasil
- Foetidia clusioides; native to Reunion and Mauritius
- Foetidia mauritiana; native to Reunion and Mauritius
- Frangula caroliniana (Syn.: Rhamnus caroliniana); Southern United States
- Gallesia integrifolia (Syn.: Crateva gorarema) (German Knoblauchbaum, Páo, Pau d'alho); Brasil to Peru
- Gustavia augusta; from South America
- Gyrocarpus americanus; pantropical tree in family Hernandiaceae
- Jacksonia furcellata (grey stinkwood); native to Australia
- Jacksonia sternbergiana (green stinkwood); native to Australia
- Juniperus sabina (German Stinkholz); Middle Europe to Asia
- Lasianthus purpureus; Indonesia
- Mansoa alliacea (cipó d'alho); Northern South America
- Nyssa sylvatica; eastern to southeastern United States
- Ocotea bullata (black stinkwood, true stinkwood); native to South Africa
  - other species of Ocotea, e.g. Ocotea foetens (Til, tilo), native to Macaronesia
- Olax zeylanica (German Stinkholz); Sri Lanka, Bangladesh
- Olax stricta (German Stinkholz); Eastern Australia
- Owenia cepiodora (onionwood); Australia
- Pararchidendron pruinosum ; Eastern Australia
- Piscidia carthagenensis; Central America to Northern South America
- Petersianthus macrocarpus (bastard stinkwood); South Africa
- Pseudosmodingium perniciosum (Syn.: Rhus perniciosa); Western Mexico
- Prunus africana (red stinkwood); native to montane Subsaharan Africa
- Rhus aromatica; Eastern United States to Mexico and Tadzhikistan, Uzbekistan
- Saprosma arborea; Indonesia
- Scorodophloeus zenkeri (German Knoblauchrinde, garlic tree); Cameroon, Congo, Zaïre
- Seguieria americana (German Stinkholz, Knoblauchholz, as "Seguiera floribunda", Páo, Pau or Cipó d'alho); Northern South America
- Sorbus aucuparia (German Stinkholz); Europe to Western Russia, Iran
- Sterculia foetida; India to Southeast Asia
- Styphnolobium japonicum (Syn.: Macrotropis foetida); from South China
- Sideroxylon foetidissimum; Florida, South Mexico, Guatemala, Antilles
- Zieria arborescens; native to Australia
