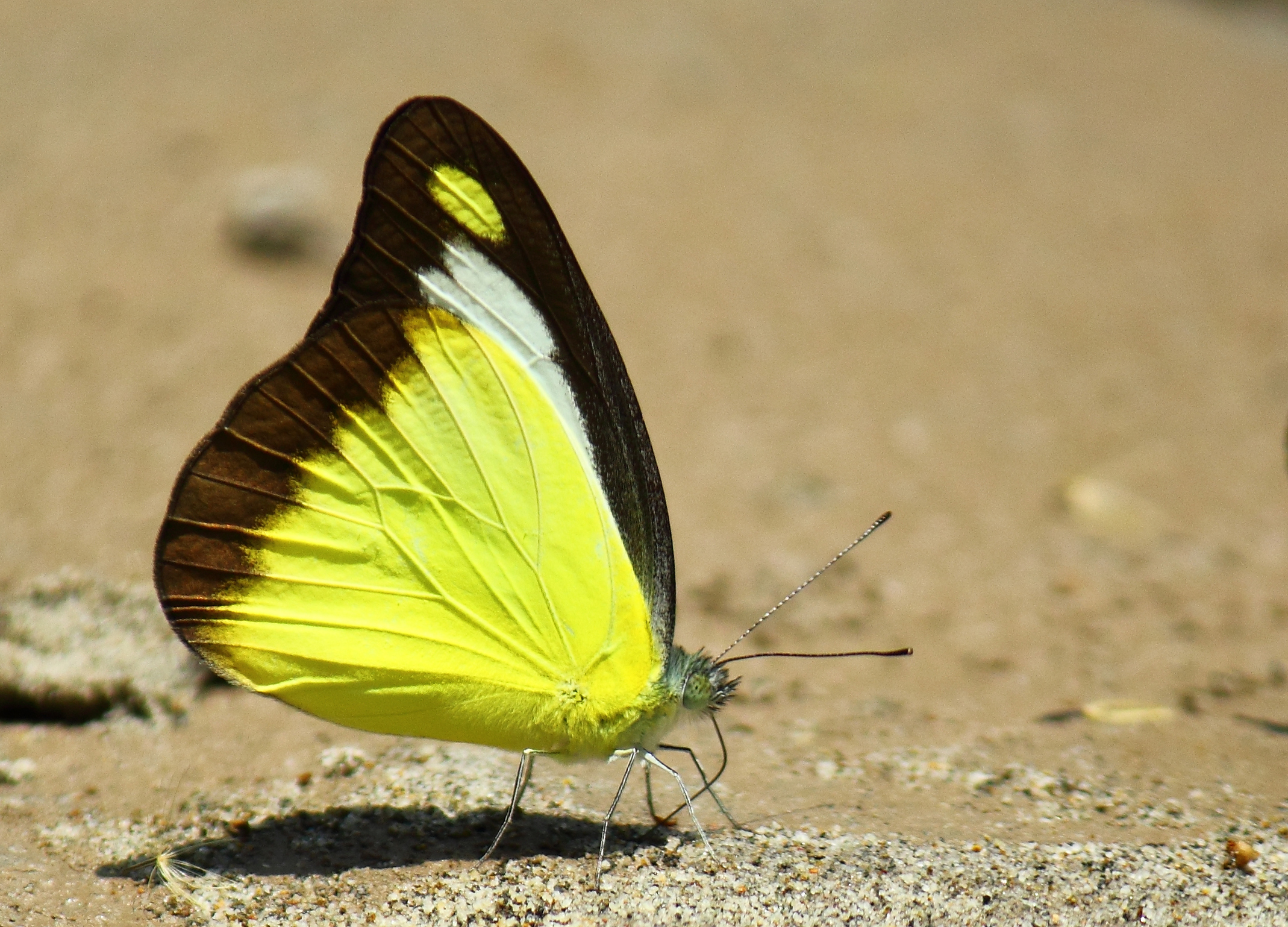
- Ventral view

Scientific classification
- Kingdom: Animalia
- Phylum: Arthropoda
- Clade: Pancrustacea
- Class: Insecta
- Order: Lepidoptera
- Family: Pieridae
- Genus: Appias
- Species: A. lyncida

Binomial name
- Appias lyncida Cramer, 1777

Subspecies
- A. l. andrea; A. l. balambangensis; A. l. eleonora; A. l. formosana; A. l. hippona; A. l. vasava

Synonyms
- Papilio hippo Cramer, [1779]; Appias taprobana Moore, 1879

= Appias lyncida =

Chocolate albatross

Species of butterfly

Appias lyncida, the vibrant chocolate albatross or chocolate albatross(*), is a butterfly of the family Pieridae, that is, the yellows and whites, which is found in south and southeast Asia.

(* But see Appias placidia also known as the chocolate albatross)

== Range ==
The chocolate albatross is found in India, China, Sri Lanka, Myanmar, Malaysia, Indonesia, Philippines, Thailand, Laos, Indochina, Taiwan, Hainan and possibly South China.

In India, the butterfly ranges across south India, Nicobar Islands, Sikkim to Assam, and onto Myanmar. In South India, the chocolate albatross is to be found along the foot of the Western Ghats. It is found throughout the year in the Nilgiris where it is locally common. In the northern parts of peninsular India it extends into Orissa and north up to Lucknow.

== Status ==
In India, the northern race of the butterfly is common, while it is local and scarce in other parts of its range.

== Description ==
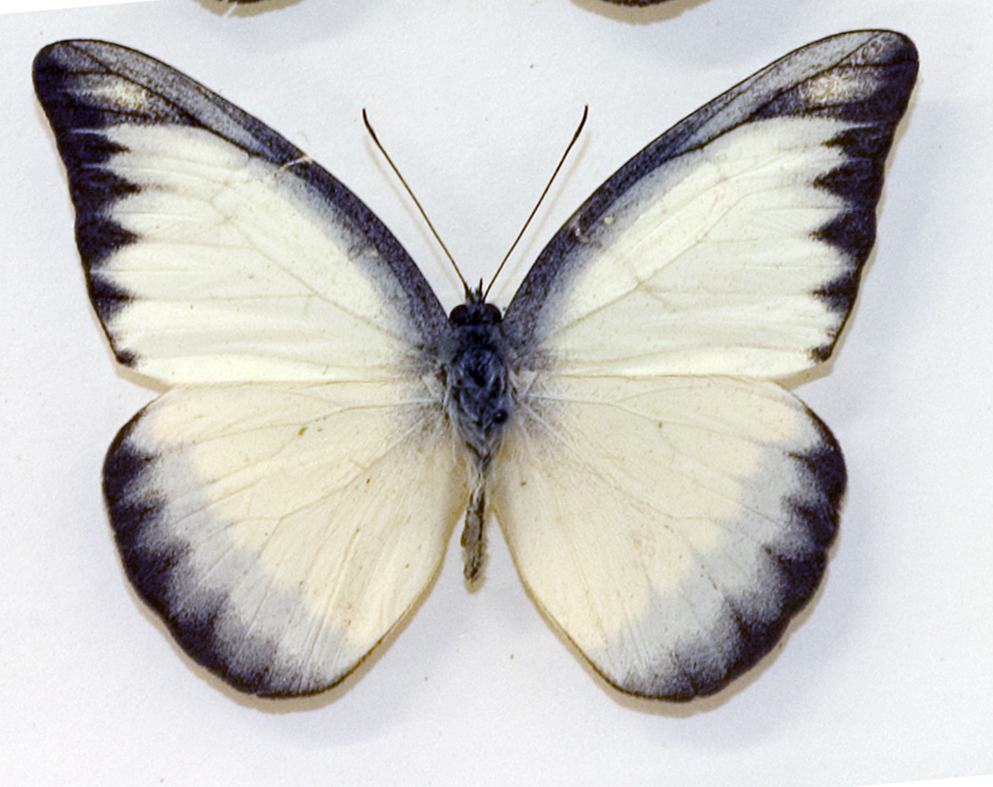

The chocolate albatross has a wingspan of 55 to 70 mm. The male is white above with chocolate-brown or black margins, and, bright lemon yellow below with chocolate-coloured markings. The female is white and densely clouded with dark brown.

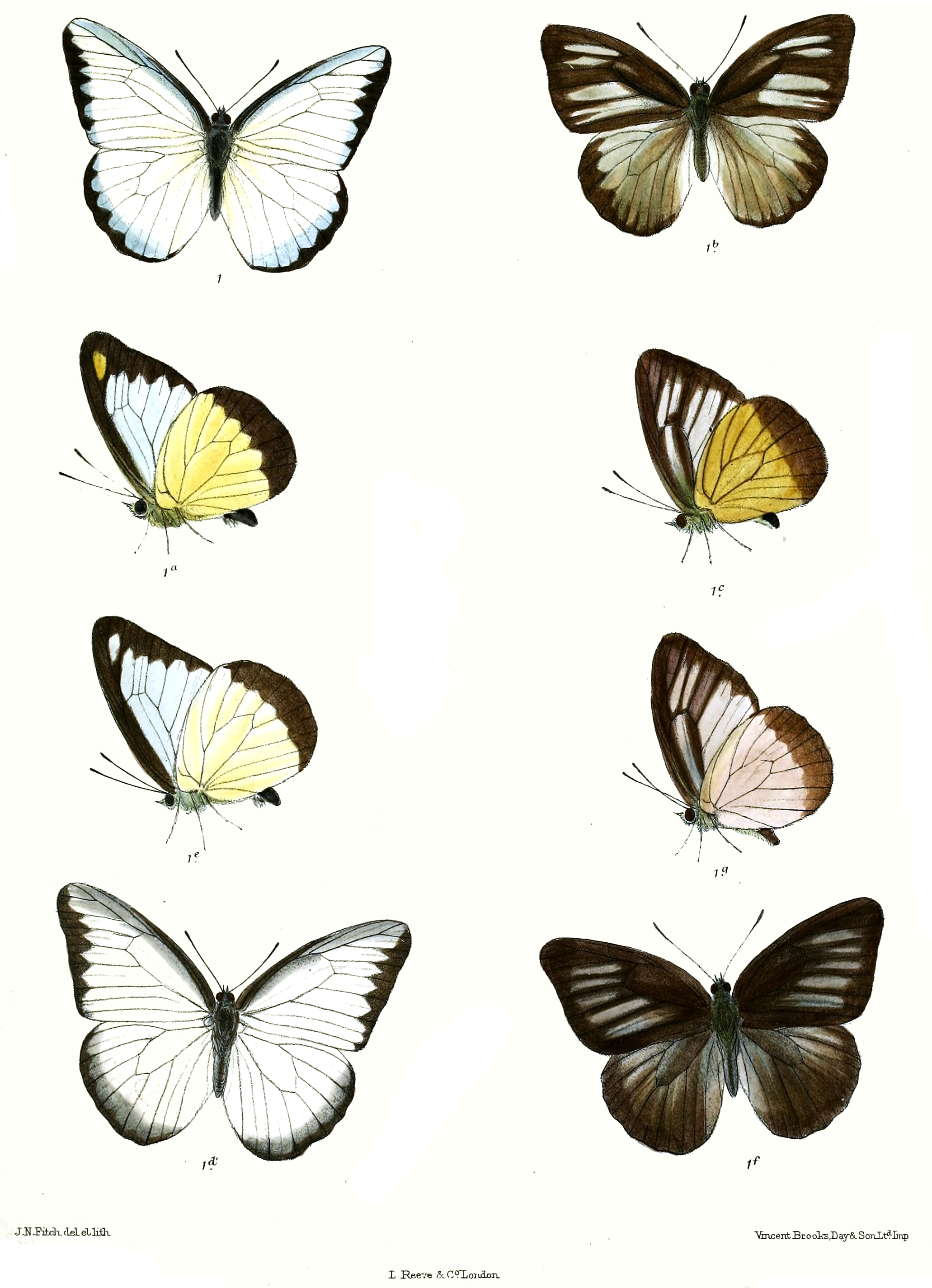

The butterfly shows seasonal dimorphism and is very variable. The detailed descriptions are as follows:

- Wet-season form:

Male - white above, with bluish costa and termen inwardly edged with black teeth-like markings on the forewing. The hindwing is similarly toothed on the termen, which has a bluish inward border. The underside of the hindwing is bright yellow and is outwardly bordered with dark chocolate.
Female - black upperside of the forewing with four white streaks on the disc. Blackish upperside of the hindwing except for the whitish discal area. The underside of the hindwing may be yellowish or whitish and have broad dark band at the termen.

- Dry-season form: smaller.

Male - The male has narrower black margins above.
Female - Similar above to the wet-season form, but with more extensive white markings.

== Habits ==
The chocolate albatross is a forest butterfly and prefers rainy highlands, up to a level of 3,000 feet (910 m). Flying strongly and swiftly close to the ground, the albatross is frequently found in jungle clearings and along stream banks. The males are often found circling around trees and bushes. The chocolate albatross often mudpuddles, sometimes in large numbers. The butterfly occasionally visits flowers and has been recorded to visit Verbena flowers in Kodagu.

== Life cycle ==
The larvae have been recorded on Crataeva religiosa, Capparis roxburghii and Capparis heyneana.

Life cycle

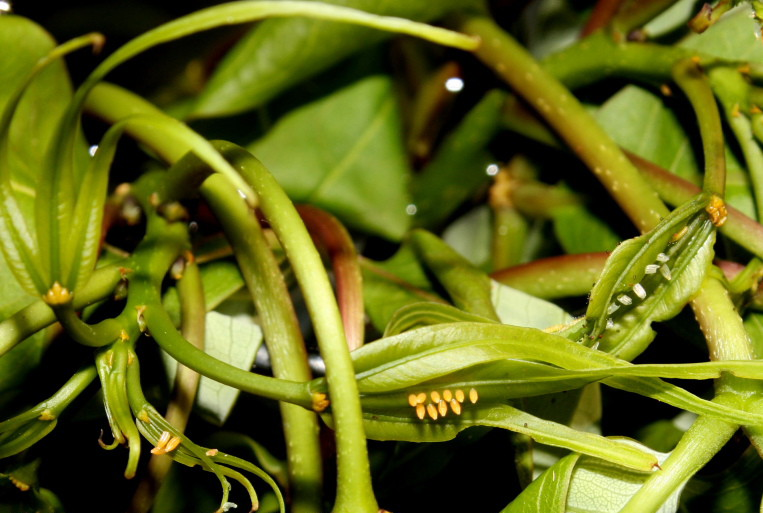
Eggs on Crateva religiosa

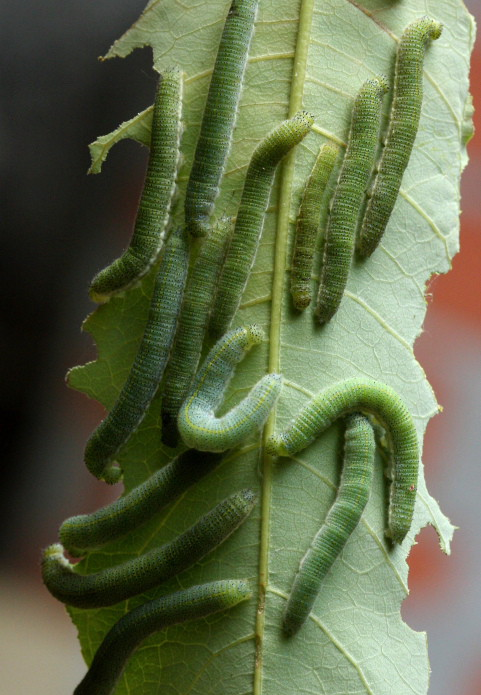
Larva

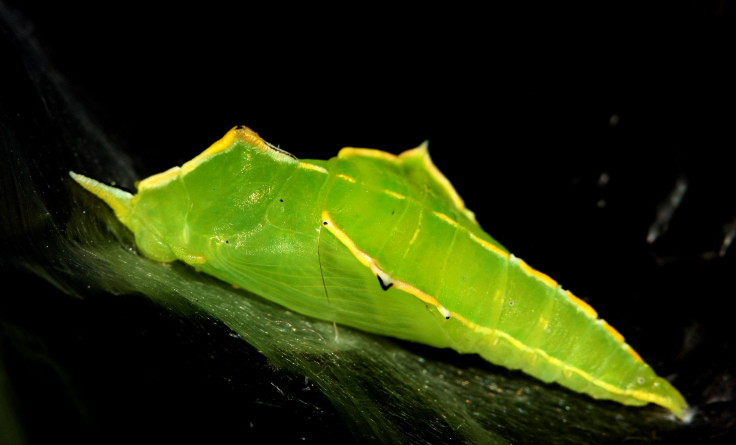
Chrysalis

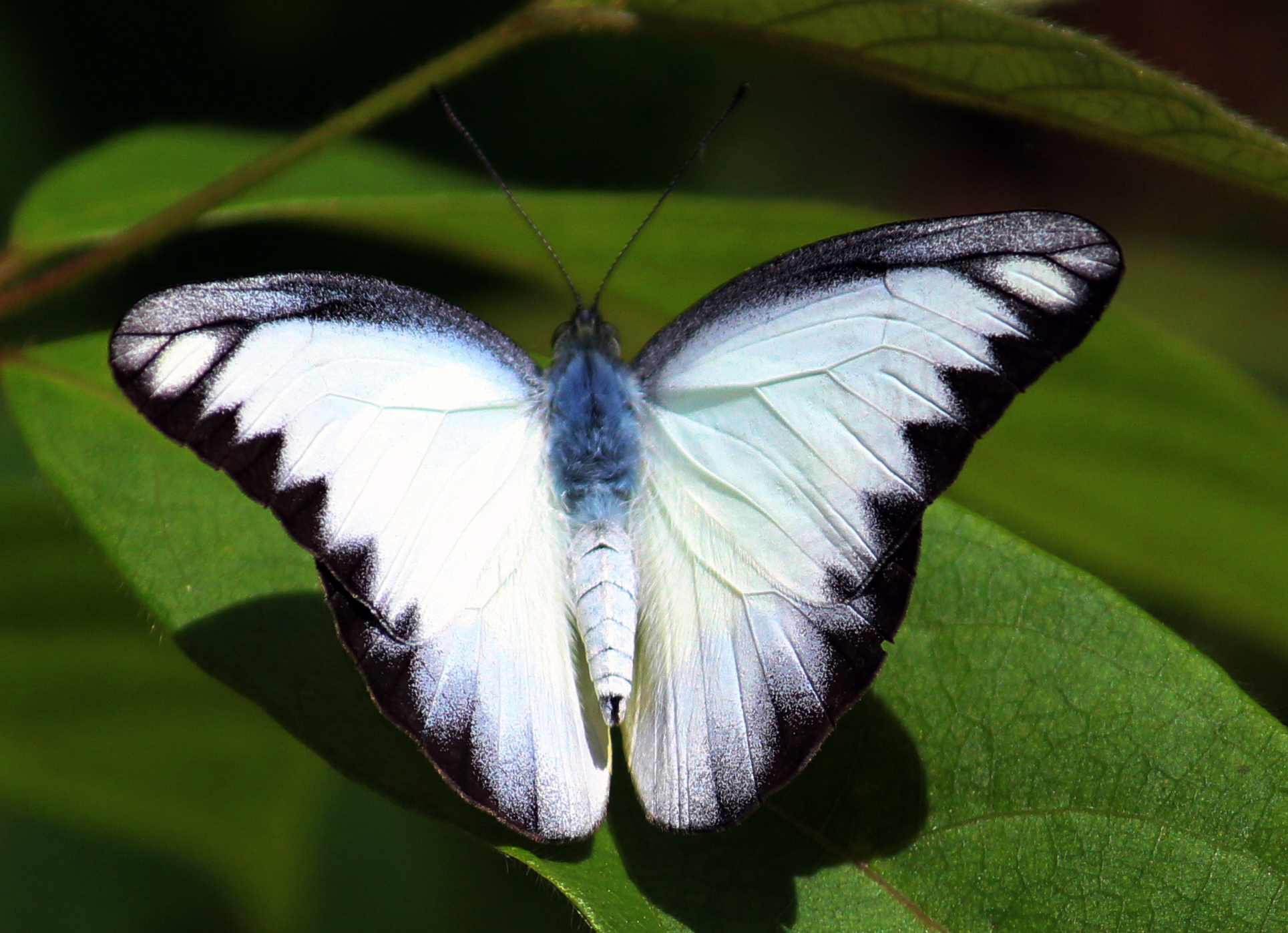
Imago (dorsal view)

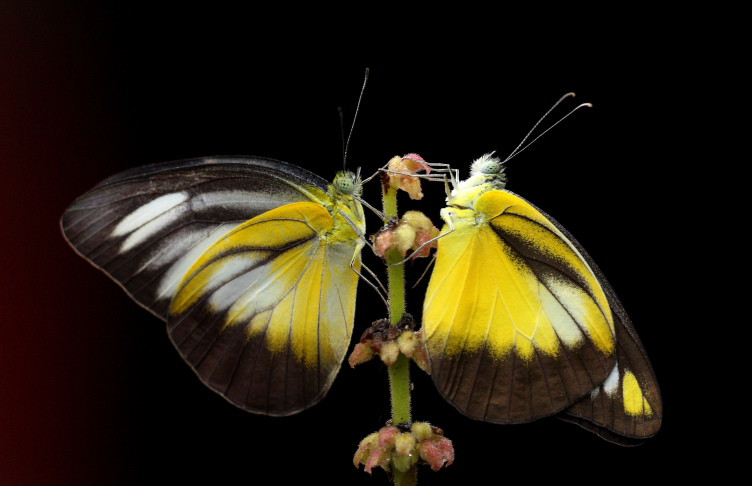
Imago (lateral view; male on right, female on left)

== See also ==
- Pieridae
- List of butterflies of India
- List of butterflies of India (Pieridae)
