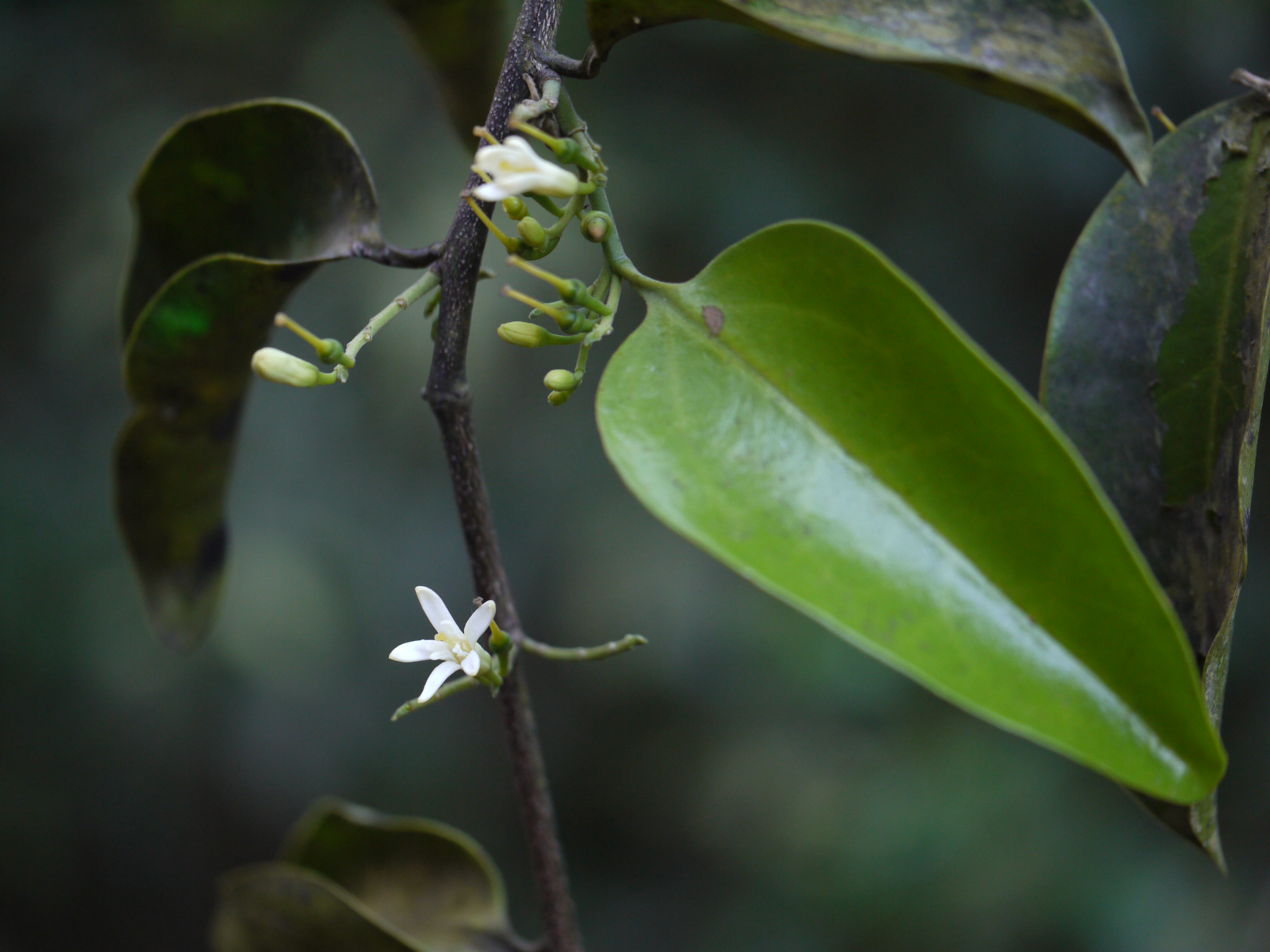

Conservation status
- Critically Endangered (IUCN 2.3)

Scientific classification
- Kingdom: Plantae
- Clade: Tracheophytes
- Clade: Angiosperms
- Clade: Eudicots
- Order: Santalales
- Family: Olacaceae
- Genus: Olax
- Species: O. psittacorum

Binomial name
- Olax psittacorum (Lam.) Vahl

Synonyms
- Fissilia disparilis Comm. ex Baill.; Fissilia psittacorum Lam. (1792); Olax breonii Baill.

= Olax psittacorum =

Species of flowering plant

Olax psittacorum is a species of flowering plant in the Olacaceae family. It is a tree native to Mauritius and Réunion. It is threatened by habitat loss.

The species was first described as Fissilia psittacorum by Jean-Baptiste Lamarck in 1792. In 1805 Martin Vahl placed it in the genus Olax as O. psittacorum.
