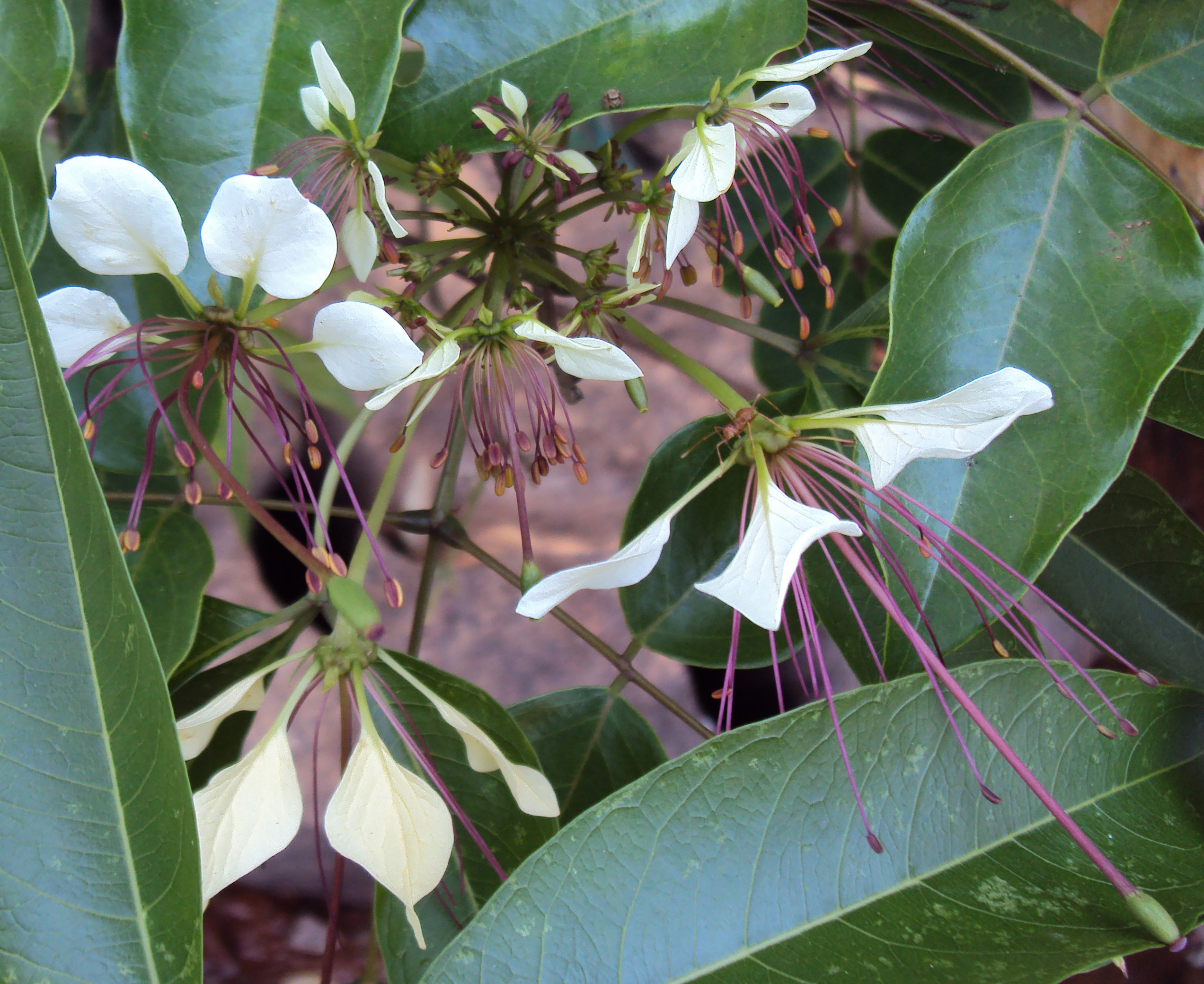

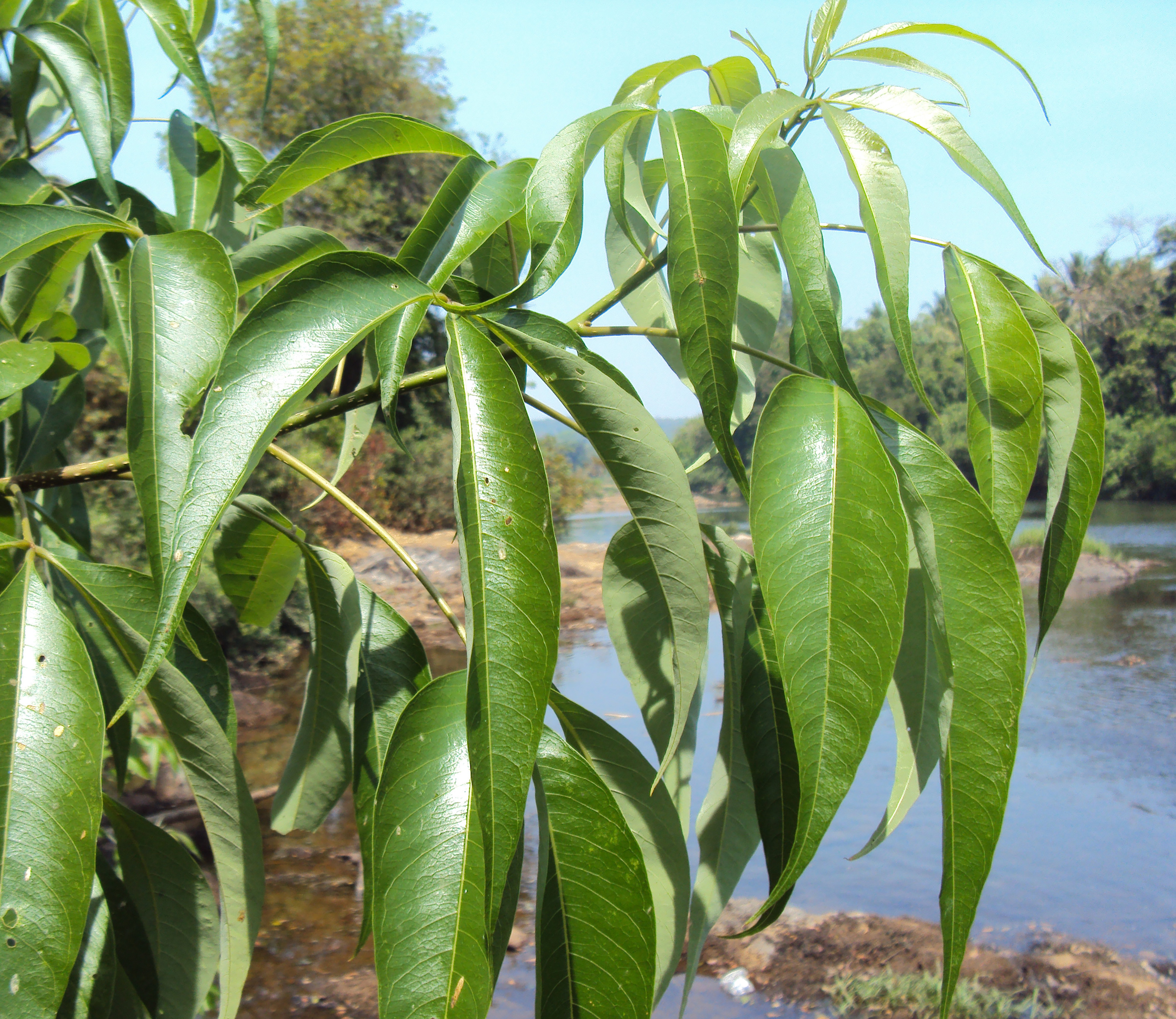

Scientific classification
- Kingdom: Plantae
- Clade: Tracheophytes
- Clade: Angiosperms
- Clade: Eudicots
- Clade: Rosids
- Order: Brassicales
- Family: Capparaceae
- Genus: Crateva
- Species: C. magna

Binomial name
- Crateva magna (Lour.) DC.

Synonyms
- Capparis magna Lour.; Crateva lophosperma Kurz; Crateva nurvala Buch.-Ham.; Crateva religiosa var. nurvula (Buch.-Ham.) Hook.f. & Thomson; Triclanthera corymbosa Raf.

= Crateva magna =

Species of flowering plant

Crateva magna is a species of flowering plant in the family Capparaceae.

It is a small wild or cultivated tree native to Bangladesh, Borneo, Cambodia, China, India, Indonesia, Japan, Java, Laos, Malaysia, Myanmar, Thailand, Tibet, and Vietnam. It is often found along streams, and also in dry, deep boulder formations in Sub-Himalayan tracts.

Crateva nurvala is now generally considered to be a synonym of this species.

== Uses ==
=== Medicinal uses ===
The dried bark is used as a raw drug in traditional systems of medicine in India, such as Ayurveda, siddha etc. A decoction of the bark is internally administered to cure diseases like renal calculi, dysuria, helminthiasis, inflammations and abscesses. The decoction has carminative, laxative, thermogenic, diuretic, lithontriptic, expectorant and demulcent actions. The leaf and stem bark have been evaluated for their antioxidant activity and the inhibition of key enzymes relevant to hyperglycemia.

=== Parts used ===
The dried bark and leaves are used for medicinal purposes.
