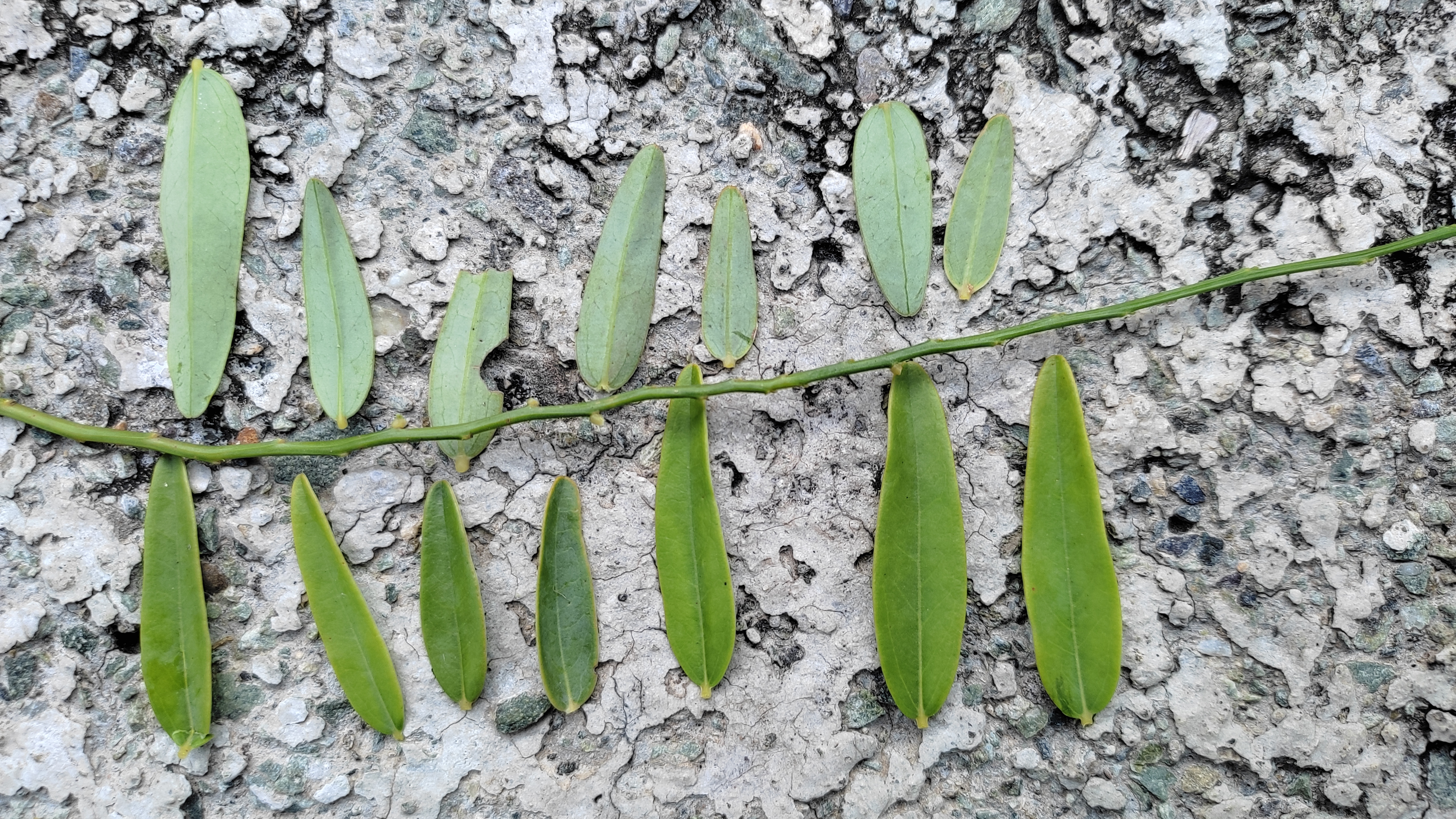

Scientific classification
- Kingdom: Plantae
- Clade: Tracheophytes
- Clade: Angiosperms
- Clade: Eudicots
- Order: Santalales
- Family: Olacaceae
- Genus: Olax
- Species: O. scandens

Binomial name
- Olax scandens Roxb.

Synonyms
- Roxburghia baccata Koen. Olax obtusa Blume; Loranthus securidacoides Warb. Drebbelia subarborescens Zoll.

= Olax scandens =

Species of flowering plant

Olax scandens is a species of epiphytic plant in the family Olacaceae. Its native range is India, Indo-China and Malesia, with no subspecies listed in the Catalogue of Life. Its name in Vietnamese is dương đầu leo or mao trật.
