= Olax nana =

Scientific classification
- Kingdom: Plantae
- Clade: Tracheophytes
- Clade: Angiosperms
- Clade: Eudicots
- Order: Santalales
- Family: Olacaceae
- Genus: Olax
- Species: O. nana

Binomial name
- Olax nana Wall. ex. Benth.

Species of flowering plant

Olax nana, known as Sudiyo in Gujarat, is a species of flowering plant in the Olacaceae family.

The species is a small, woody shrub found in Pakistan, India, Nepal, and Thailand.

== Conservation ==
The species is of special concern in Gujarat, India, where it is the sole representative of the family in the state. It was first found in the state in the early 20th century, but since 1910, wasn't found in subsequent surveys. In 2015, the species was rediscovered in the village of Lathedi. Local efforts have been enacted to protect the small population, including the construction of grazing enclosures and raising awareness.
