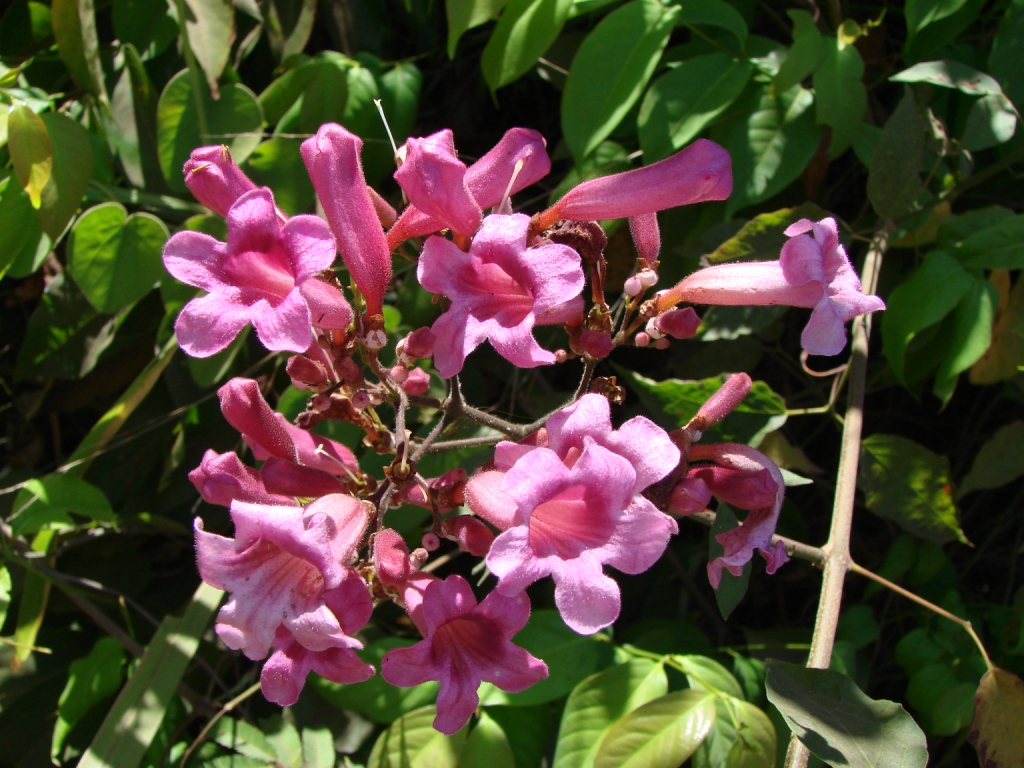

Scientific classification
- Kingdom: Plantae
- Clade: Tracheophytes
- Clade: Angiosperms
- Clade: Eudicots
- Clade: Asterids
- Order: Lamiales
- Family: Bignoniaceae
- Genus: Fridericia
- Species: F. chica

Binomial name
- Fridericia chica (Bonpl.) L.G.Lohmann

Synonyms
- Adenocalymma portoricense A.Stahl ex Bello; Adenocalymma portoricensis A. Stahl; Arrabidaea acutifolia DC.; Arrabidaea chica (Bonpl.) Verl.; Arrabidaea chica var. acutifolia (DC.) Bureau; Arrabidaea chica var. angustifolia Bureau & K.Schum.; Arrabidaea chica var. cuprea Bureau & K.Schum.; Arrabidaea chica f. cuprea (Cham.) Sandwith; Arrabidaea chica var. thyrsoidea (DC.) Bureau; Arrabidaea cuprea Pittier; Arrabidaea cuprea (Cham.) Bornm.; Arrabidaea larensis Pittier; Arrabidaea rosea DC.; Bignonia chica Bonpl.; Bignonia cuprea Cham.; Bignonia cuprea var. grandiflora Cham.; Bignonia cuprea var. parviflora Cham.; Bignonia rosea DC.; Bignonia rubescens S.Moore; Bignonia rufescens DC.; Bignonia thyrsoidea DC.; Bignonia triphylla Willd. ex DC.; Lundia chica (Bonpl.) Seem.; Temnocydia carajura Mart. ex DC.; Vasconcellia acutifolia Mart. ex DC.

= Fridericia chica =

Species of flowering plant

Fridericia chica, the cricket-vine, puca panga, chica, carayurú (Spanish), carajuru or crajiru (Portuguese), is a medicinal plant in the family Bignoniaceae, also used for cosmetics. An orange-red dye called chica, crajiru or carayurú is obtained from boiling the leaves. It is used by some native South American peoples to stain the skin.

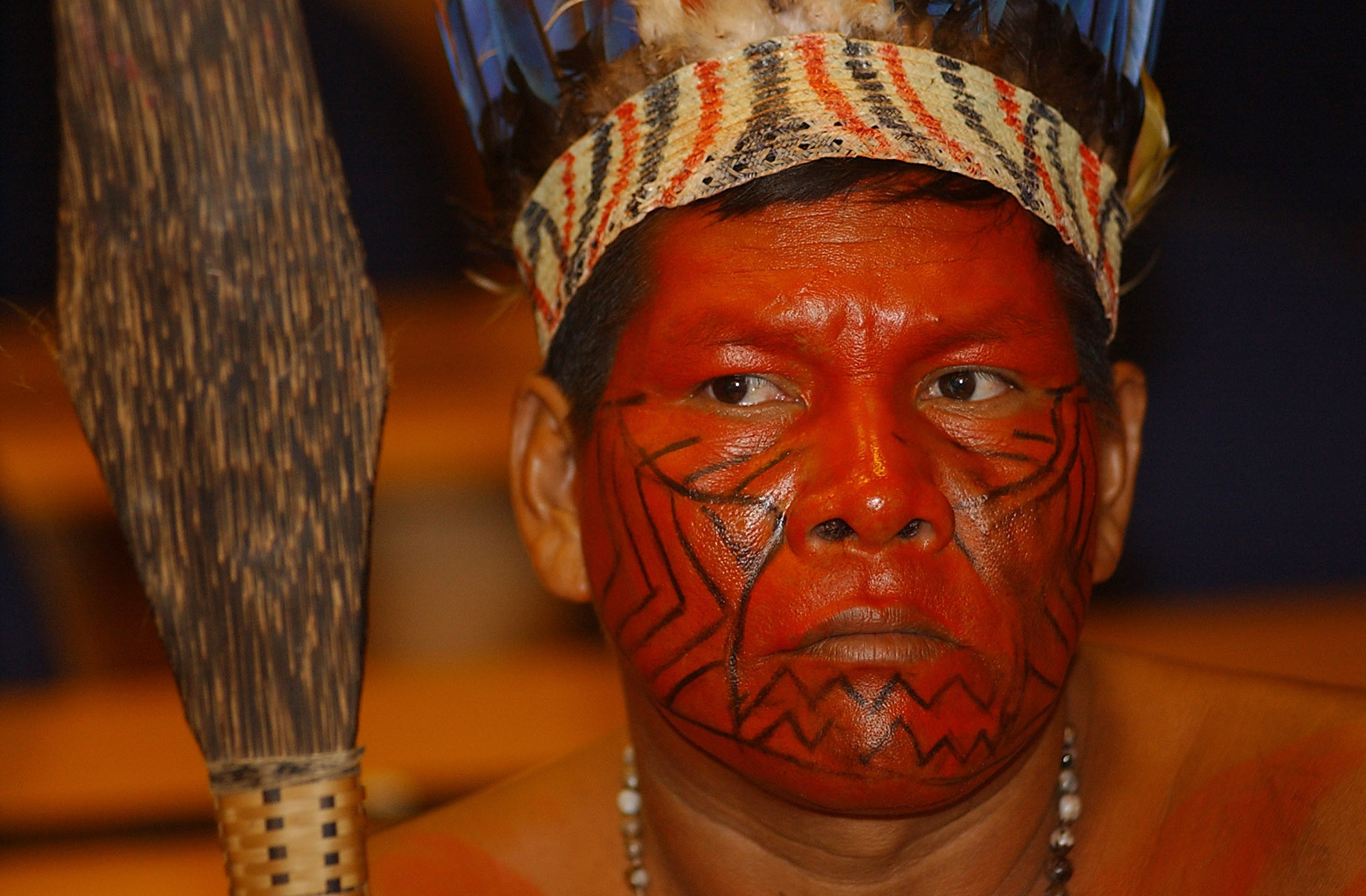
A Mura chief with his face painted with the chica dye
