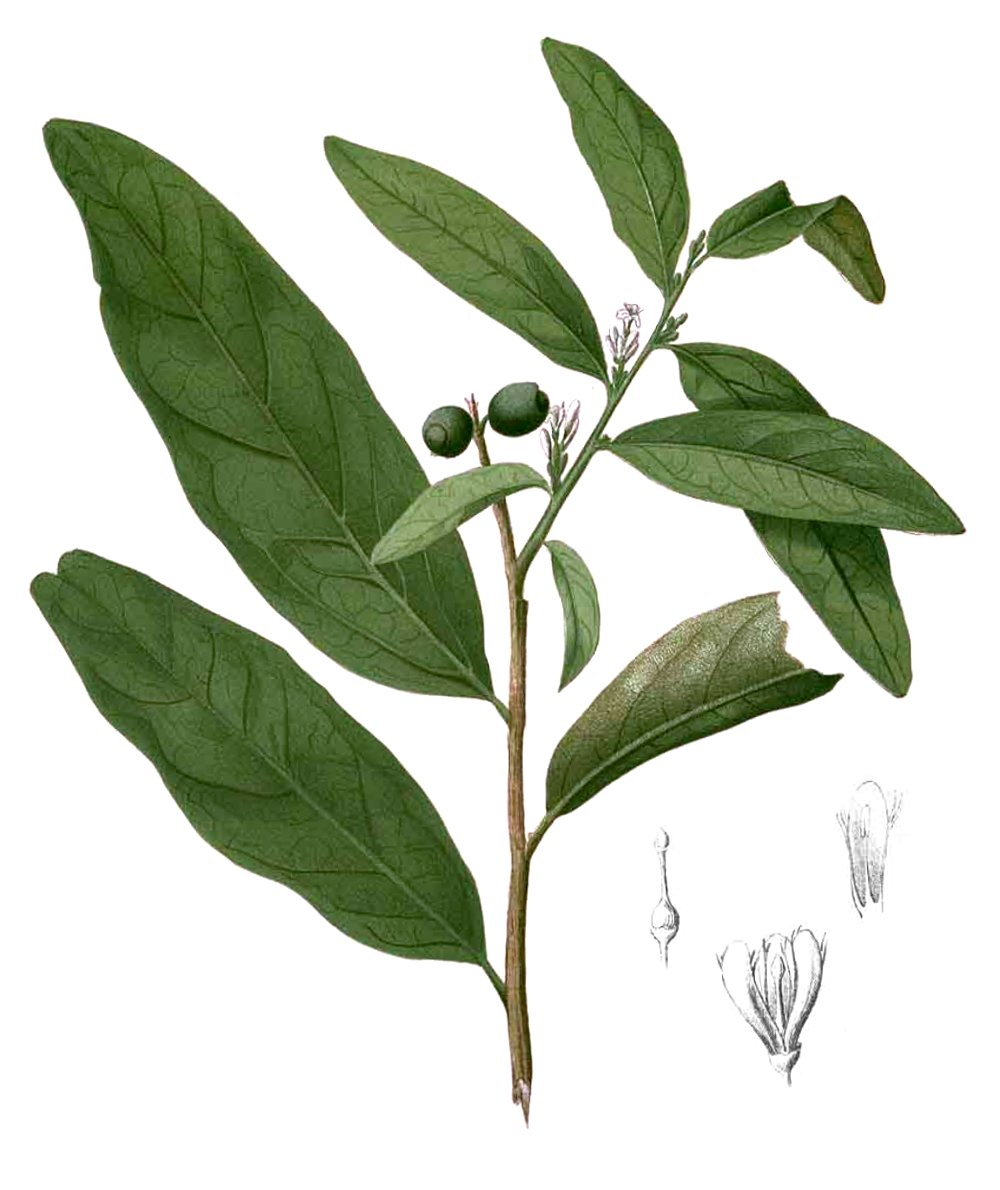
- Olax imbricata

Scientific classification
- Kingdom: Plantae
- Clade: Tracheophytes
- Clade: Angiosperms
- Clade: Eudicots
- Order: Santalales
- Family: Olacaceae
- Genus: Olax; L. (1753)

Synonyms
- Drebbelia Zoll. (1857); Dulacia Vell. (1829); Fissilia Comm. ex Juss. (1789); Hypocarpus A.DC. (1844); Liriosma Poepp. (1843); Lopadocalyx Klotzsch (1845); Pseudaleia Thouars (1806); Pseudaleioides Thouars (1806); Spermaxyrum Labill. (1806)

= Olax =

Genus of flowering plants

Olax is a plant genus in the family Olacaceae. It includes 52 species native to the tropics of South America, Africa, Asia, and Australia. The name derives from the Latin, olax (malodorous), and refers to the unpleasant scent of some of the Olax species. Olax is an Old World genus represented by several climbers, some species have leaves and fruits smelling of garlic such as Olax subscorpioidea and Olax gambecola, seeds of the latter are used as condiments in parts of West Africa. In India Olax nana is well known as one of the first species to emerge after forest fires, the shoots growing directly from buried roots.

== Species ==
The type species is O. zeylanica. According to Plants of the World Online the genus contains the following 52 species:

1. Olax acuminata Wall. ex Benth.
2. Olax angulata A.S.George
3. Olax angustifolia Compère
4. Olax antsiranensis Z.S.Rogers, Malécot & Sikes
5. Olax aphylla R.Br.
6. Olax aschersoniana Büttner
7. Olax aurantia A.S.George
8. Olax austrosinensis Y.R.Ling
9. Olax benthamiana Miq.
10. Olax candida (Poepp.) Christenh. & Byng
11. Olax capuronii Z.S.Rogers, Malécot & Sikes
12. Olax crassa (Monach.) Christenh. & Byng
13. Olax cyanocarpa (Sleumer) Christenh. & Byng
14. Olax dissitiflora Oliv.
15. Olax egleri (Bastos) Christenh. & Byng
16. Olax emirnensis Baker
17. Olax gambecola Baill.
18. Olax gardneriana Benth.
19. Olax gossweileri Exell & Mendonça
20. Olax guianensis (Engl.) Christenh. & Byng
21. Olax hypoleuca Baill.
22. Olax imbricata Roxb.
23. Olax inopiflora (Miers) Christenh. & Byng
24. Olax lanceolata Cavaco & Keraudren
25. Olax latifolia Engl.
26. Olax macrophylla Benth.
27. Olax madagascariensis (DC.) Cavaco
28. Olax mannii Oliv.
29. Olax mayottensis Z.S.Rogers, Malécot & Sikes
30. Olax nana Wall. ex Benth.
31. Olax obcordata A.S.George
32. Olax obtusifolia De Wild.
33. Olax papillosa (Bastos) Christenh. & Byng
34. Olax pauciflora Benth.
35. Olax pendula L.S.Sm.
36. Olax pentandra Sleumer
37. Olax phyllanthi R.Br.
38. Olax psittacorum (Lam.) Vahl
39. Olax redmondii (Steyerm.) Christenh. & Byng
40. Olax retusa F.Muell. ex Benth.
41. Olax scalariformis A.S.George
42. Olax scandens Roxb.
43. Olax singularis (Vell.) Christenh. & Byng
44. Olax spartea A.S.George
45. Olax staudtii Engl.
46. Olax stricta R.Br.
47. Olax subscorpioidea Oliv.
48. Olax tepuiensis (Steyerm.) Christenh. & Byng
49. Olax thouarsii (DC.) Valeton
50. Olax triplinervia Oliv.
51. Olax wildemanii Engl.
52. Olax zeylanica L.

== Gallery ==
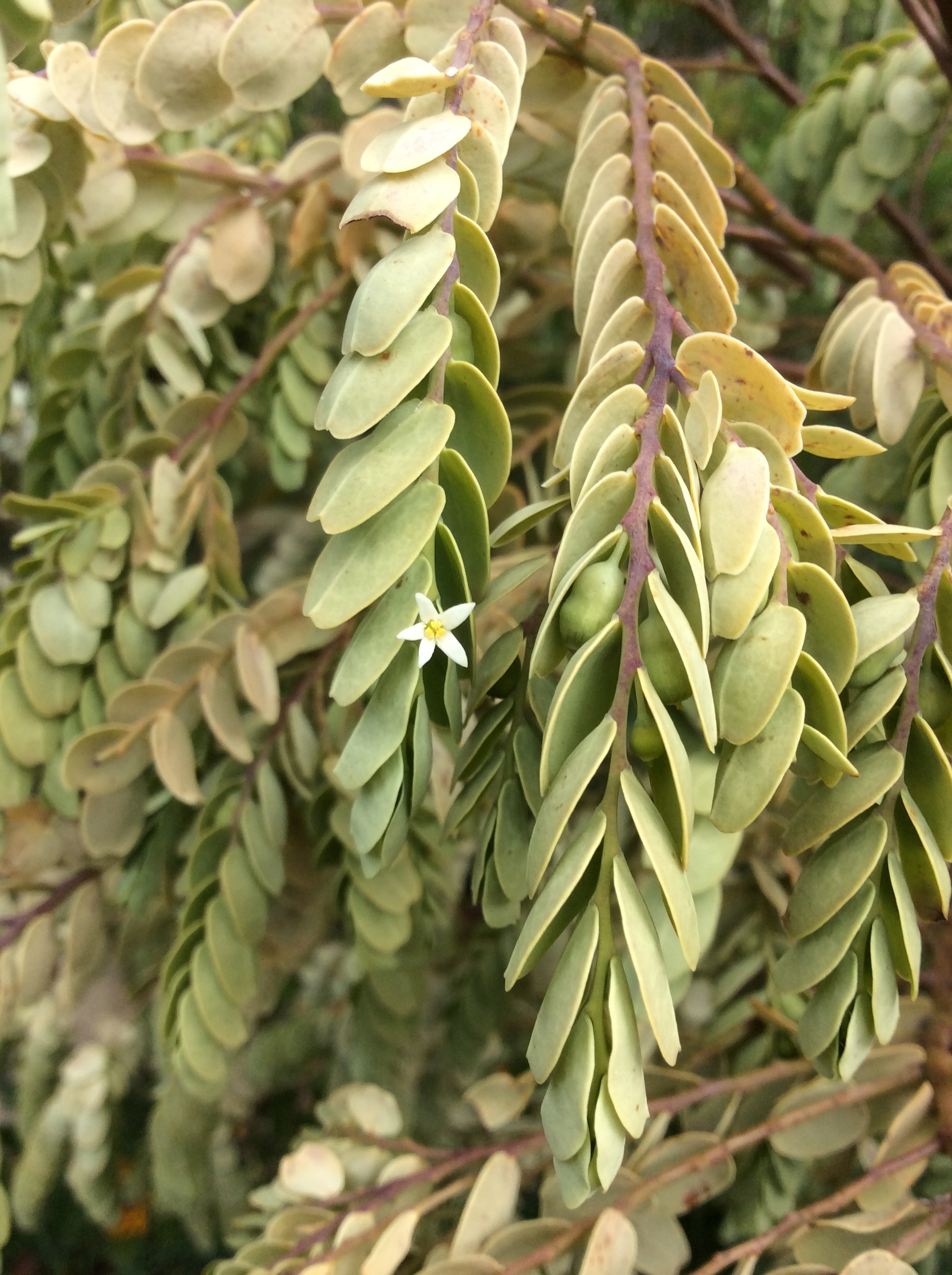
Olax phyllanthi

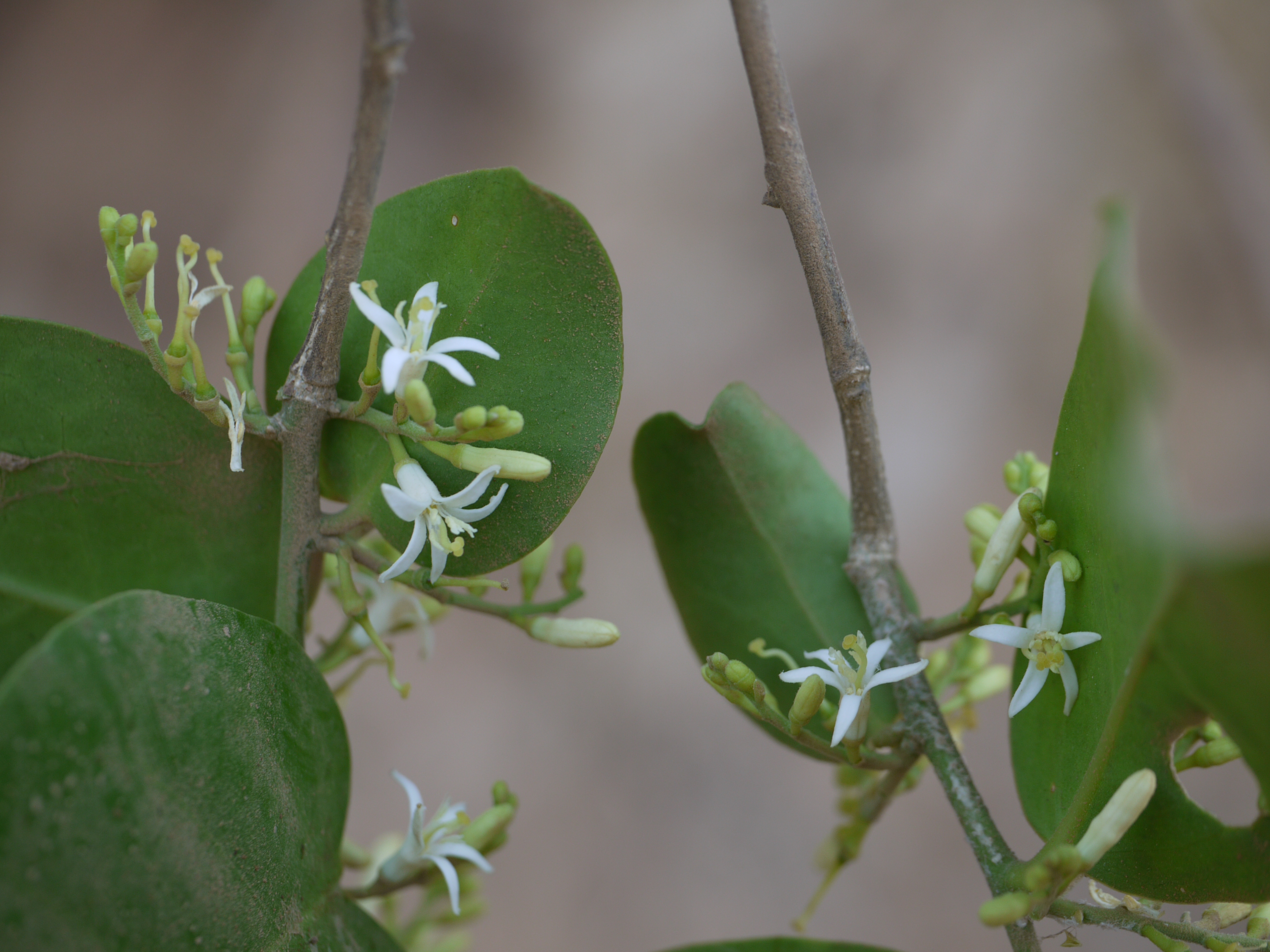
Olax imbricata, flowers

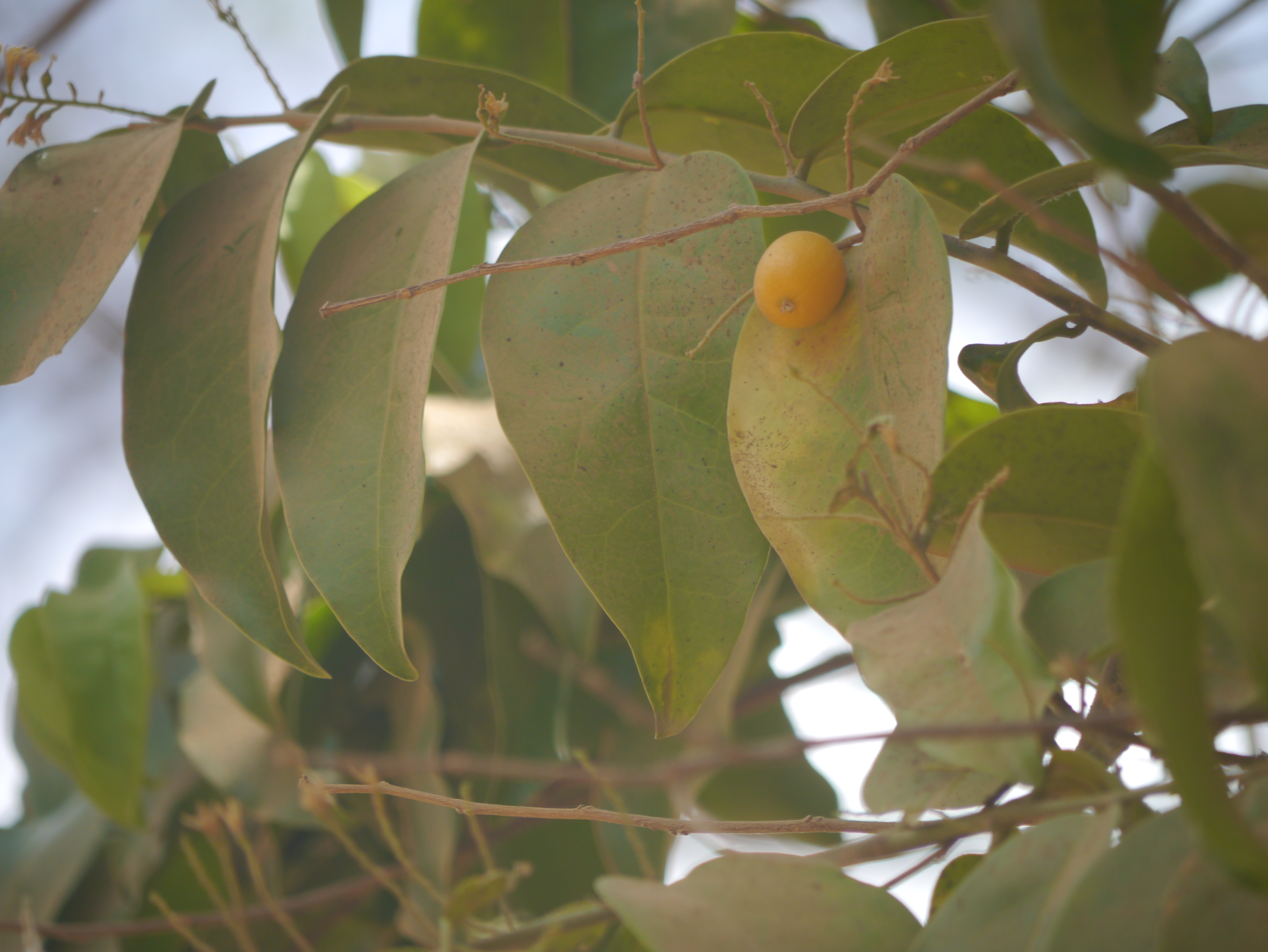
Olax imbricata, fruit

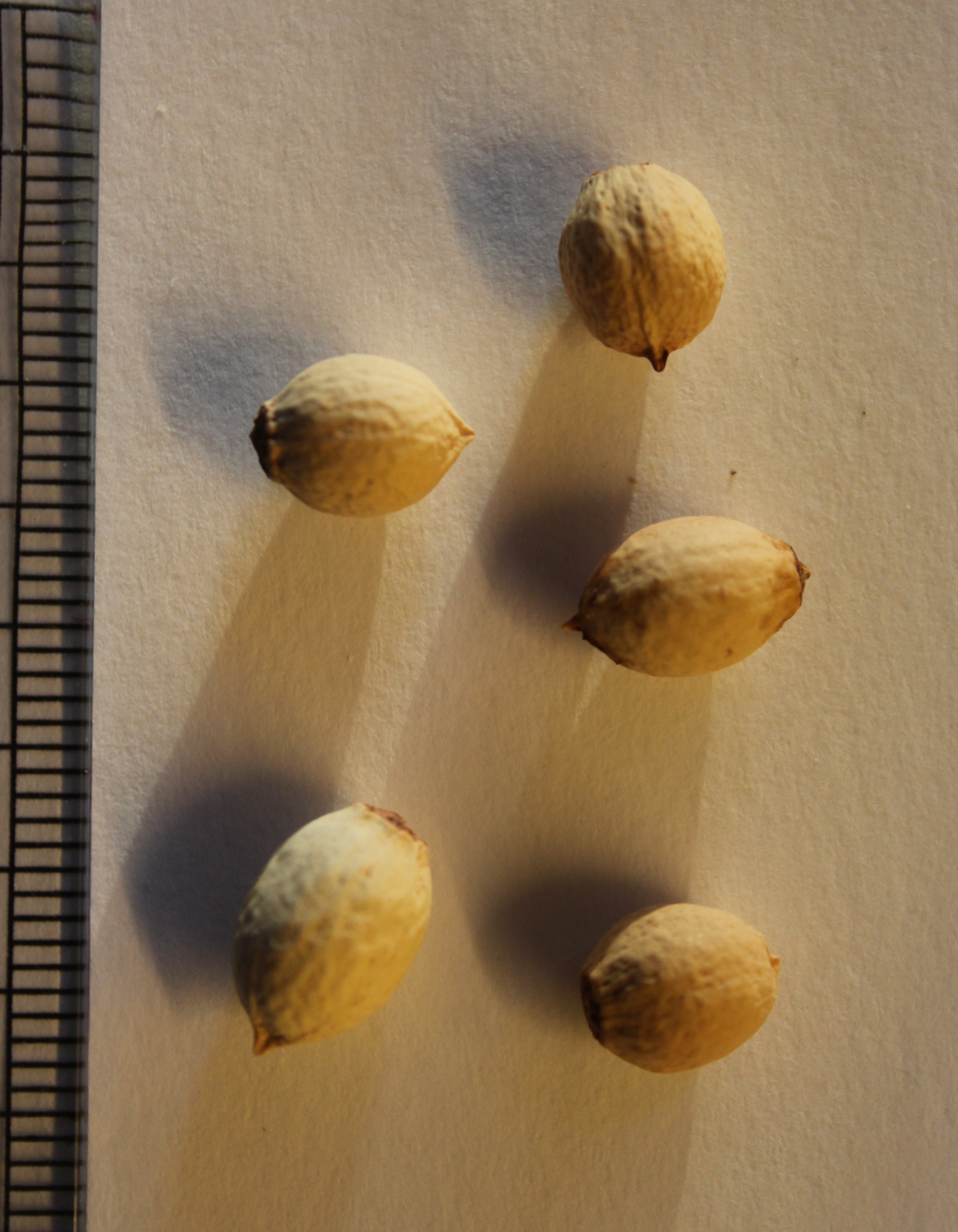
Olax scandens, seeds

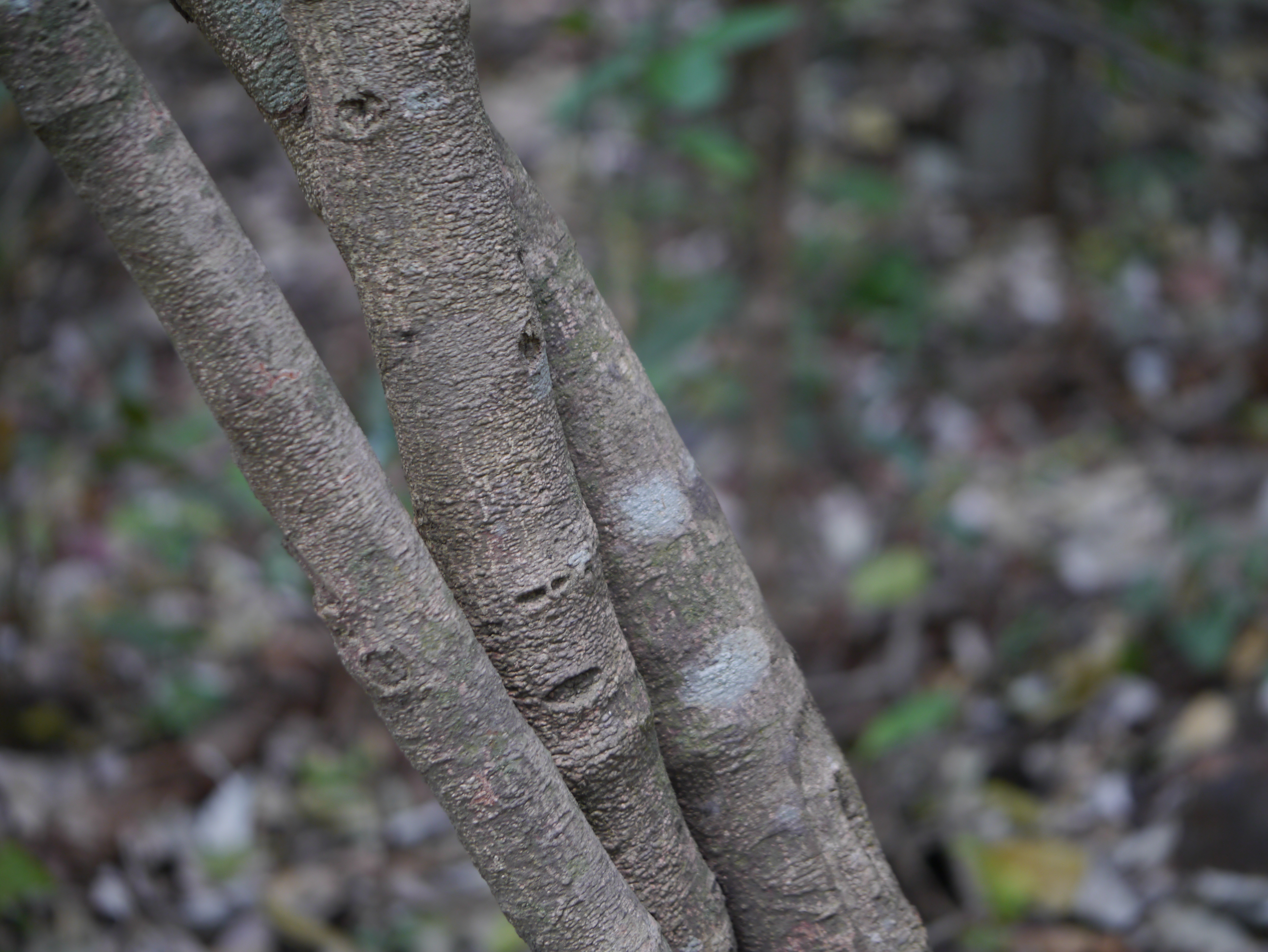
Olax imbricata, bark
