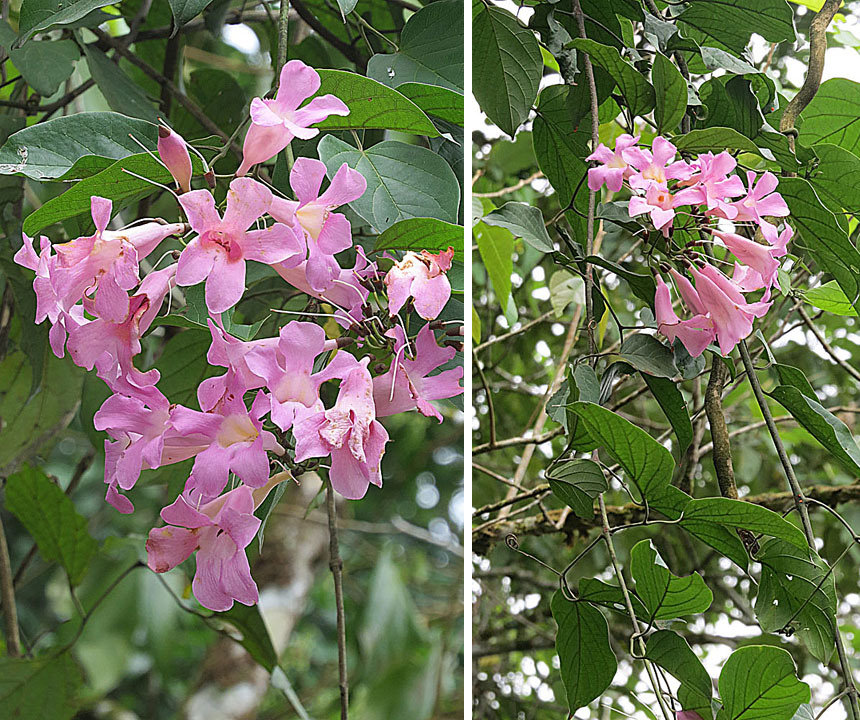
- Fridericia dichotoma (also known as Arrabidaea corallina), a vine from the Rio Hollin area of Ecuador

Scientific classification
- Kingdom: Plantae
- Clade: Tracheophytes
- Clade: Angiosperms
- Clade: Eudicots
- Clade: Asterids
- Order: Lamiales
- Family: Bignoniaceae
- Tribe: Bignonieae
- Genus: Fridericia; Mart. (1827)

Species
- Many; see text

Synonyms
- Alsocydia Mart. ex DC., 1845; Alsocydia Mart. ex J.C.Gomes, 1951; Arrabidaea DC., 1838; Chasmia Schott in Spreng., 1827; Fredericia G.Don, 1837, orth. var.; Neomacfadya Baill., 1888; Neomacfadyena K.Schum. in Engl. & Prantl, 1894; Panterpa Miers, 1863; Paracarpaea Pichon, 1863; Paramansoa Baill., 1888; Pentelesia Raf., 1838; Petastoma Miers, 1863; Piriadacus Pichon, 1946; Scobinaria Seibert, 1940; Sideropogon Pichon, 1946; Vasconcellia Mart., 1837

= Fridericia (plant) =

Genus of flowering plants

Fridericia is a genus of plants in the family Bignoniaceae.

== Species ==
- Fridericia artherion
- Fridericia bahiensis
- Fridericia bracteolata
- Fridericia candicans
- Fridericia carichanensis
- Fridericia caudigera
- Fridericia celastroides
- Fridericia chica
- Fridericia cinerea
- Fridericia cinnamomea
- Fridericia claussenii
- Fridericia conjugata
- Fridericia corchoroides
- Fridericia costaricensis
- Fridericia crassa
- Fridericia craterophora
- Fridericia cuneifolia
- Fridericia dichotoma
- Fridericia dispar
- Fridericia egensis
- Fridericia elegans
- Fridericia erubescens
- Fridericia fagoides
- Fridericia fanshawei
- Fridericia floribunda
- Fridericia florida
- Fridericia formosa
- Fridericia grosourdyana
- Fridericia guilielma
- Fridericia japurensis
- Fridericia lasiantha
- Fridericia lauta
- Fridericia leucopogon
- Fridericia limae
- Fridericia mollis
- Fridericia mollissima
- Fridericia monophylla
- Fridericia mutabilis
- Fridericia nicotianiflora
- Fridericia nigrescens
- Fridericia oligantha
- Fridericia ornithophila
- Fridericia oxycarpa
- Fridericia paradoxa
- Fridericia parviflora
- Fridericia patellifera
- Fridericia pearcei
- Fridericia pilulifera
- Fridericia platyphylla
- Fridericia pliciflora
- Fridericia podopogon
- Fridericia poeppigii
- Fridericia prancei
- Fridericia pubescens
- Fridericia pulchella
- Fridericia rego
- Fridericia samydoides
- Fridericia schumanniana
- Fridericia simplex
- Fridericia speciosa
- Fridericia spicata
- Fridericia subincana
- Fridericia subverticillata
- Fridericia trachyphylla
- Fridericia trailii
- Fridericia triplinervia
- Fridericia truncata
- Fridericia tynanthoides
- Fridericia whitei
- Fridericia viscida
