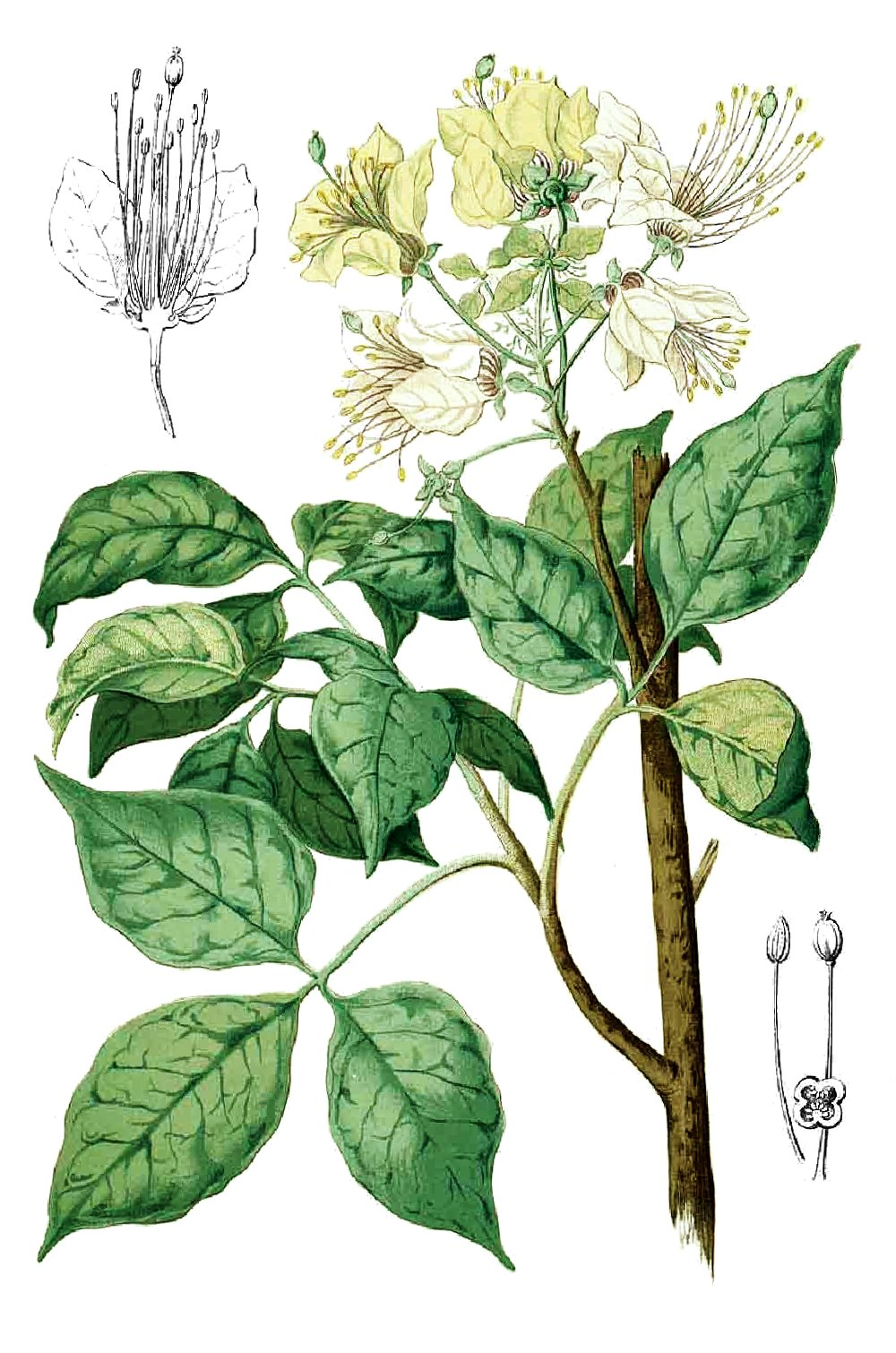
- Crateva religiosa

Scientific classification
- Kingdom: Plantae
- Clade: Tracheophytes
- Clade: Angiosperms
- Clade: Eudicots
- Clade: Rosids
- Order: Brassicales
- Family: Capparaceae
- Genus: Crateva; L. (1753)

Synonyms
- Chelidurus Willd. (1790); Cladostemon A.Braun & Vatke (1876); Euadenia Oliv. ex Benth. & Hook.f. (1867); Nevosmila Raf. (1838); Othrys Noronha ex Thouars (1806); Pteropetalum Pax (1891); Tapia Mill. (1754); Triclanthera Raf. (1838)

= Crateva =

Genus of flowering plants

Crateva is a genus of flowering plants in the caper family, Capparaceae. It includes 21 species which range through the tropical regions of the world, including the tropical Americas (Mexico to northeastern Argentina), sub-Saharan Africa, the Indian subcontinent, Indochina, southern China, Japan, Malesia, Papuasia, Queensland, and the South Pacific.

== Species ==
Accepted species include:

- Crateva adansonii DC.
- Crateva brevipetala (Exell) Christenh. & Byng
- Crateva eminens (Hook.f.) Christenh. & Byng
- Crateva excelsa Bojer
- Crateva falcata (Lour.) DC.
- Crateva formosensis (Jacobs) B.S.Sun
- Crateva greveana Baill.
- Crateva humblotii (Baill.) Hadj-Moust.
- Crateva hygrophila Kurz
- Crateva kirkii (Oliv.) Christenh. & Byng
- Crateva magna (Lour.) DC.
- Crateva monticola (Gilg & Gilg-Ben.) Christenh. & Byng
- Crateva obovata Vahl
- Crateva palmeri Rose
- Crateva religiosa G.Forst.
- Crateva simplicifolia J.S.Mill.
- Crateva suaresensis Baill.
- Crateva tapia L.
- Crateva unilocularis Buch.-Ham.
- Crateva urbaniana R.Rankin
- Crateva yarinacochaensis Cornejo & Iltis

=== Formerly placed here ===
- Aegiceras corniculatum (L.) Blanco (as C. corniculatum (L.) L.)
- Aegle marmelos (L.) Corrêa (as C. marmelos L.)
