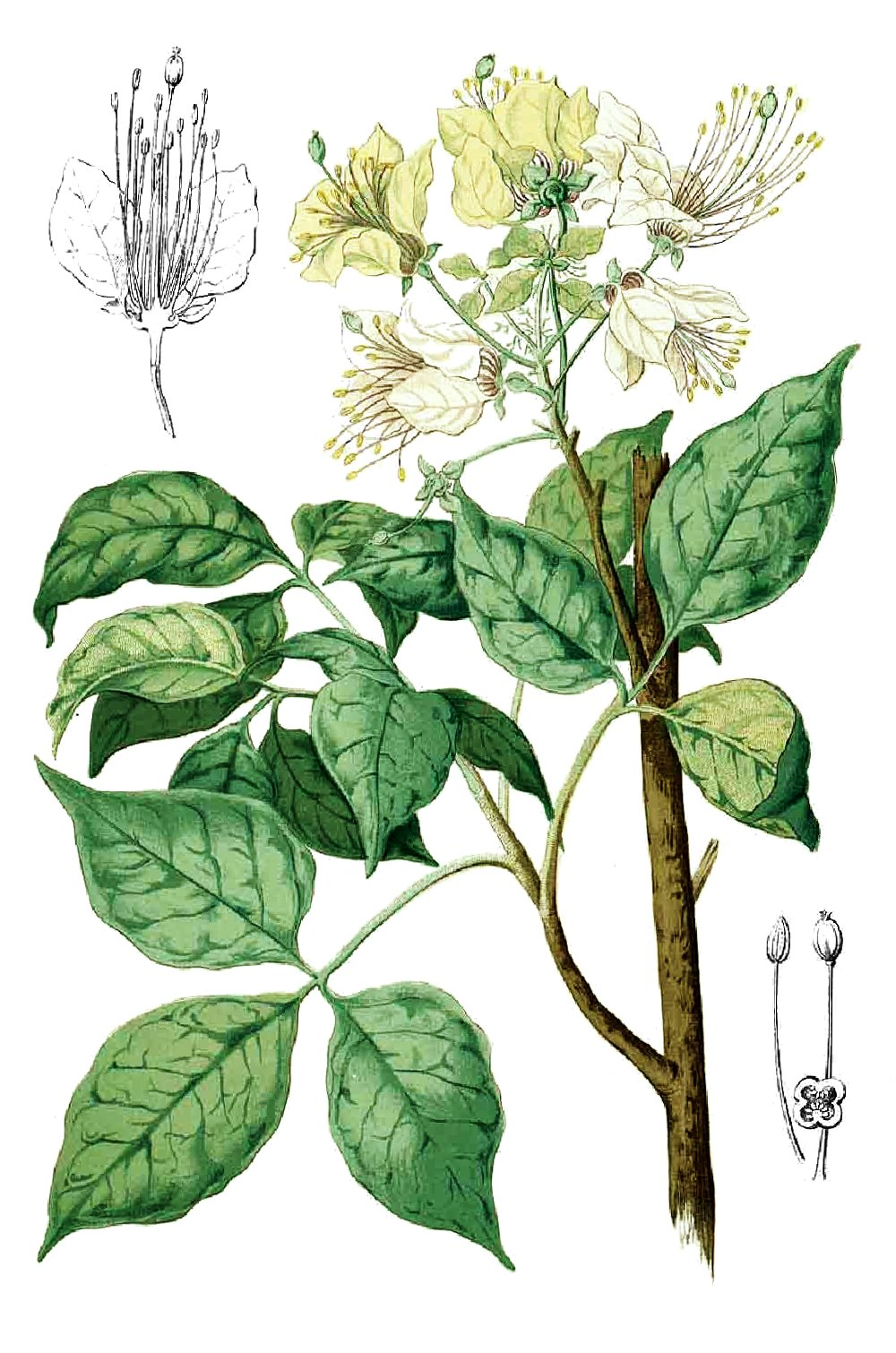

Conservation status
- Least Concern (IUCN 3.1)

Scientific classification
- Kingdom: Plantae
- Clade: Embryophytes
- Clade: Tracheophytes
- Clade: Angiosperms
- Clade: Eudicots
- Clade: Rosids
- Order: Brassicales
- Family: Capparaceae
- Genus: Crateva
- Species: C. religiosa

Binomial name
- Crateva religiosa G.Forst.

Synonyms
- Crateva brownii Korth. ex Miq.; Crateva hansemannii K.Schum.; Crateva macrocarpa Kurz; Crateva membranifolia Miq.; Crateva speciosa Volkens

= Crateva religiosa =

Species of flowering plant

Crateva religiosa, the sacred garlic pear or temple plant, is a species of flowering tree. It is a member of the capers family. The tree is sometimes called the spider tree because the showy flowers bear long, spidery stamens. It is native to much of tropical Asia and several South Pacific islands. It is grown elsewhere for fruit, especially in parts of Africa.

The garlic pear tree is a perennial that can grow up to 15 m (49 ft). The nectar-filled flowers are attractive to a multitude of insects and birds. A pierid butterfly, Hebomoia glaucippe, is a frequent visitor to this plant.

The chemical compound lupeol can be extracted from the bark of C. religiosa.
