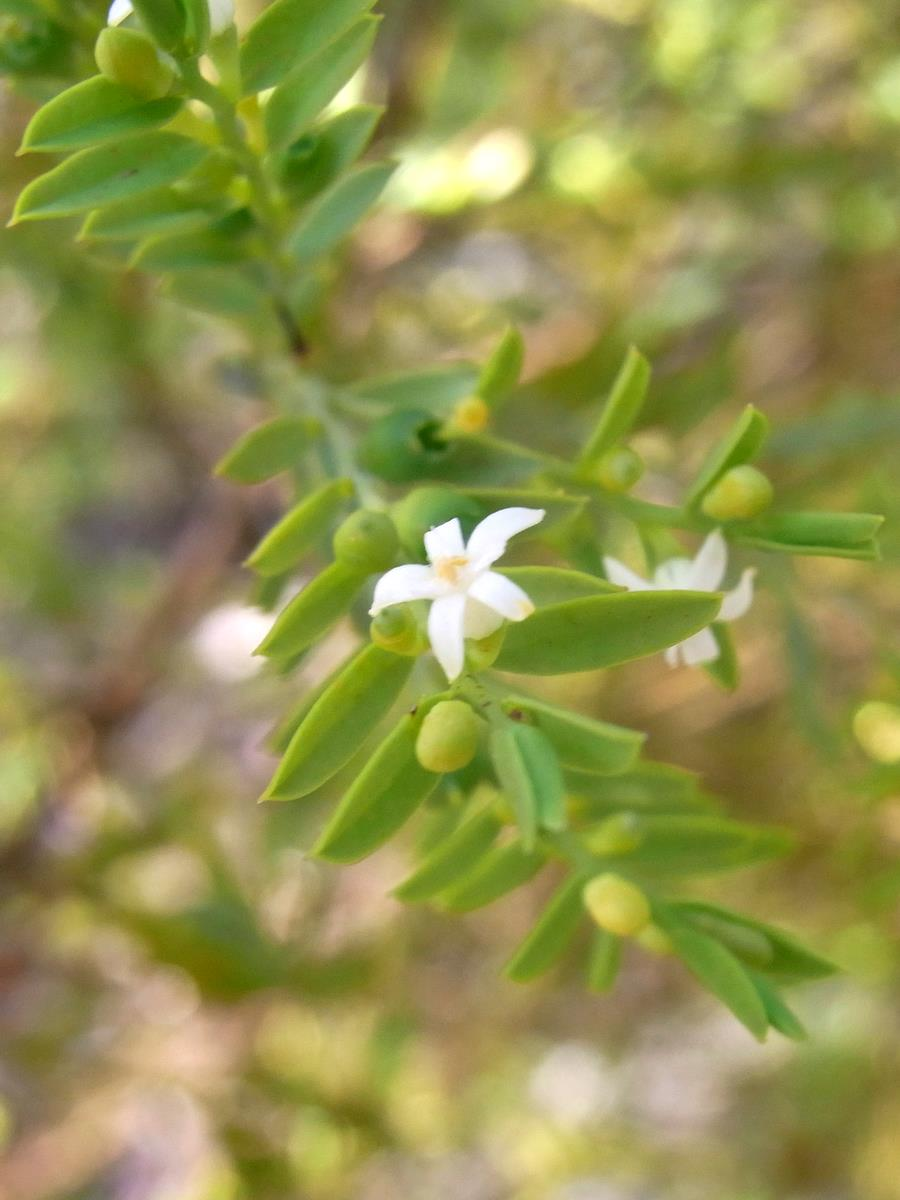
- Muogamarra Nature Reserve, Australia

Scientific classification
- Kingdom: Plantae
- Clade: Tracheophytes
- Clade: Angiosperms
- Clade: Eudicots
- Order: Santalales
- Family: Olacaceae
- Genus: Olax
- Species: O. stricta

Binomial name
- Olax stricta R.Br.

= Olax stricta =

Species of flowering plant

Olax stricta is a plant in the Olacaceae family. Growing to two metres high, it is found in eastern Australia. The habitat includes infertile sites in dry eucalyptus woodland on sandstone or granite. Occasionally also seen on dunes and shrubland. Not a common species, but widely distributed. It has been suggested that the pale yellow-green foliage indicates this plant may be a root parasite. The olive fruit is fleshy, and is around 8 mm long and 5 mm wide.

The specific epithet stricta is derived from the Latin which refers to the erect compact form, in “bundles”. First collected by white man in Sydney in the early colonial days. And in 1810, this species first appeared in scientific literature in the Prodromus Florae Novae Hollandiae, authored by the prolific Scottish botanist, Robert Brown.
