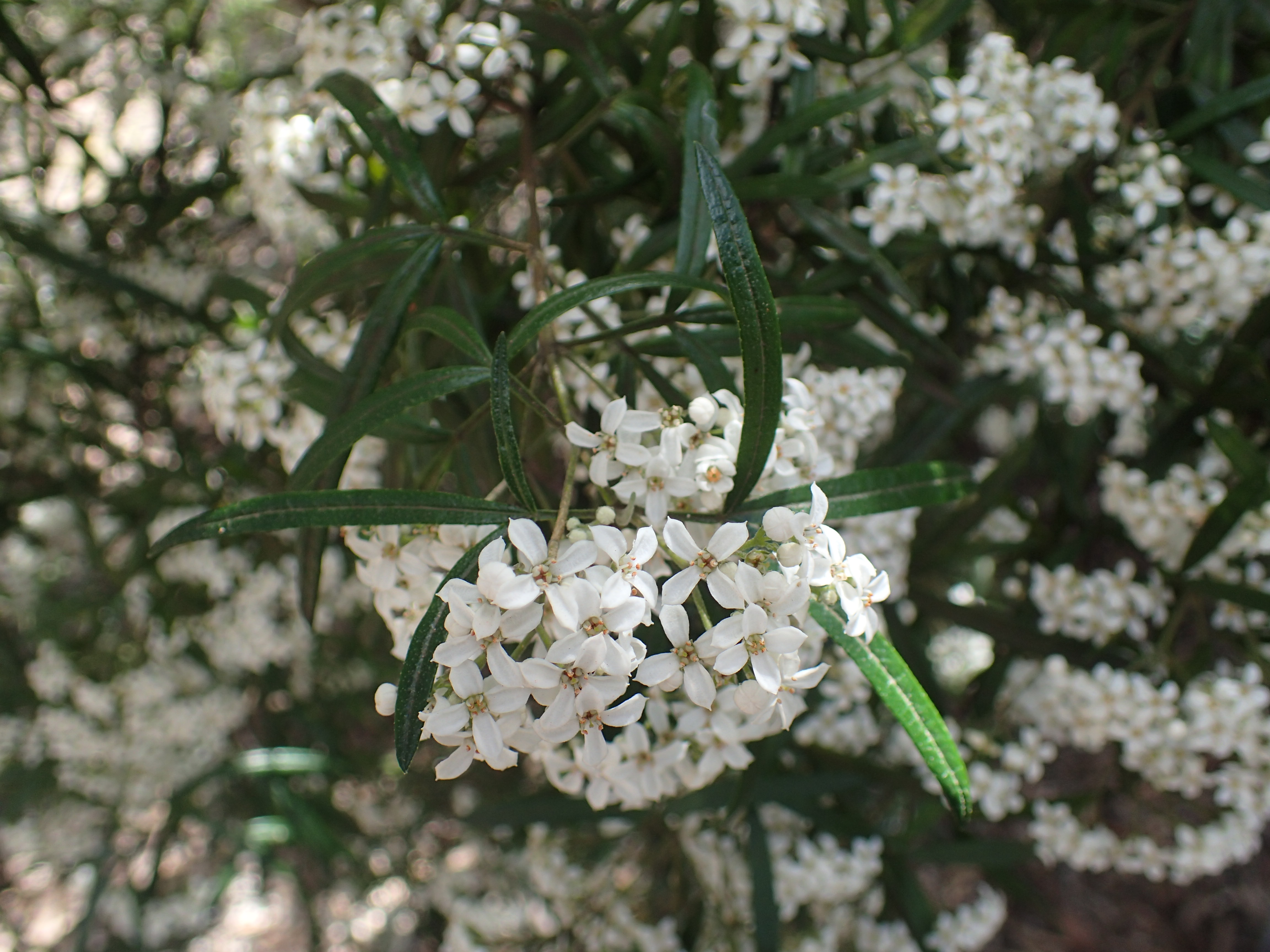
- In the Australian National Botanic Gardens

Scientific classification
- Kingdom: Plantae
- Clade: Tracheophytes
- Clade: Angiosperms
- Clade: Eudicots
- Clade: Rosids
- Order: Sapindales
- Family: Rutaceae
- Genus: Zieria
- Species: Z. arborescens

Binomial name
- Zieria arborescens Sims

= Zieria arborescens =

Species of flowering plant

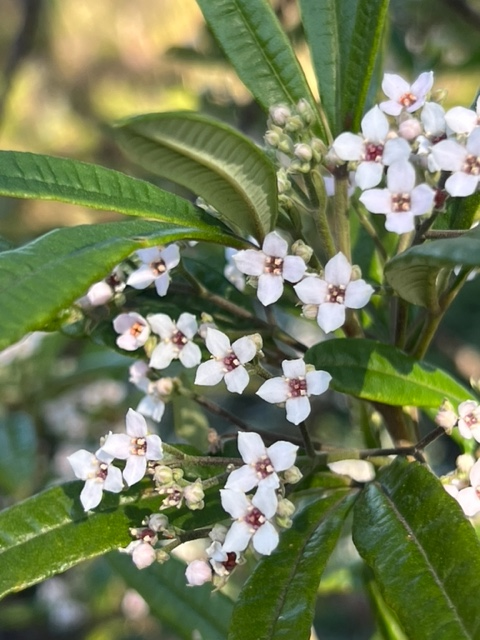
Zieria arborescens subsp. arborescens

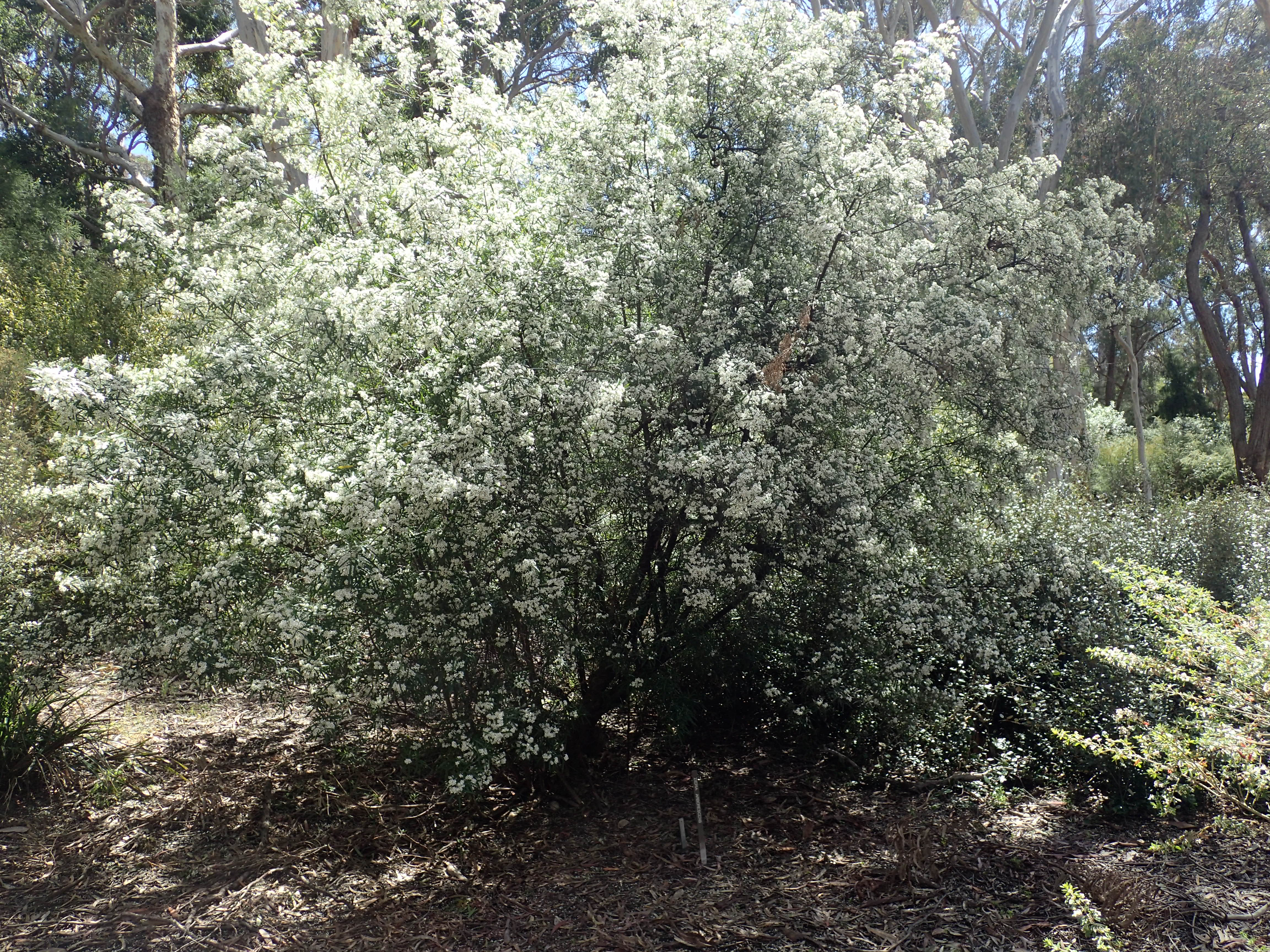
Habit in the Australian National Botanic Gardens

Zieria arborescens, commonly known as the tree zieria or stinkwood, is a plant in the citrus family Rutaceae and is endemic to eastern Australia. It is a bushy shrub or small tree with branches that are ridged and scaly or hairy, at least when young. It has leaves composed of three leaflets and groups of flowers with four white petals, the groups usually shorter than the leaves.

== Description ==
Zieria arborescens is a robust shrub or small tree which grows to a height of 5–10 m (20–30 ft). Its branches are ridged where older leaves have fallen and are usually scaly or hairy, at least when young. The leaves are composed of three leaflets which vary in size and shape but are mostly lance-shaped or oblong, 50–90 mm (2–4 in) long and 6–15 mm (0.2–0.6 in) wide with a stalk 15–30 mm (0.6–1 in) long. The edges of the leaves are more or less rolled downwards with the upper surface dark green and glabrous while the lower surface is hairy and pale in colour. Both surfaces of the leaf are dotted with oil glands.

The flowers are white or pale pink and are arranged in large groups in upper leaf axils, the groups usually shorter than the leaves. There are four more or less hairy, triangular sepal lobes about 1.5–2.5 mm (0.06–0.1 in) long. The four petals are 3–6.5 mm (0.1–0.3 in) long and slightly hairy. In common with other zierias, there are only four stamens. Flowering occurs from September to November and is followed by a capsule containing seeds which have an ant-attracting elaiosome.

== Taxonomy and naming ==
Zieria arborescens was first formally described in 1811 by English taxonomist John Sims and the description was published in Botanical Magazine. The original specimen was from Joseph Banks's collection in London. The specific epithet (arborescens) means "tending to a tree-like form".

In 2002, James Armstrong described three subspecies in Australian Systematic Botany, and the names are accepted by the Australian Plant Census:

- Zieria arborescens Sims subsp. arborescens is a robust shrub or small tree to 10 m (33 ft), its branchlets slightly ridged, the branchlets usually with short, star-shaped hairs, the petiole and central leaflet densely woolly-hairy, and the peduncles softly-hairy.
- Zieria arborescens subsp. decurrens J.A.Armstr. is a robust shrub to 3 m (9.8 ft), its branchlets distinctly ridged, the branchlets only covered with star-shaped hairs when young, the lower surface of the petiole and lower surface of the central leaflet softly-hairy or glabrous, and the peduncles with only a few hairs.
- Zieria arborescens subsp. glabrifolia J.A.Armstr. is a robust shrub or small tree to 10 m (33 ft), its branchlets slightly ridged, the branchlets with short, star-shaped hairs, the petiole, central leaflet and peduncles glabrous.

== Distribution and habitat ==
Tree zieria occurs in Queensland, New South Wales, Victoria and Tasmania, growing in wet forest and at the margins of rainforest. Subspecies glabrifolia only occurs on the New England Tablelands between the Girraween National Park in Queensland and Torrington in New South Wales. Subsp. decurrens is only recorded from near Jervis Bay where it grows in drier eucalyptus areas and features ridged non-warty branches and more hairs on the young branchlets.
