= Olax zeylanica =

Scientific classification
- Kingdom: Plantae
- Clade: Tracheophytes
- Clade: Angiosperms
- Clade: Eudicots
- Order: Santalales
- Family: Olacaceae
- Genus: Olax
- Species: O. zeylanica

Binomial name
- Olax zeylanica Wall.

Species of flowering plant

Olax zeylanica is a plant species in the family Olacaceae and the type species of the genus Olax. It is found in Bangladesh, India, Myanmar, Sri Lanka, where it is widely used as a leafy vegetable in rural areas. It is known by local people as "මැල්ල - mella" in Sri Lanka.

== Ecology ==
Intermediate forest subcanopy.

== Uses ==
Leaves- vegetable, medicinal.

It is widely used as leafy vegetable and also as remedy for snake bites in Sri Lankan Ayurvedic medicine.
