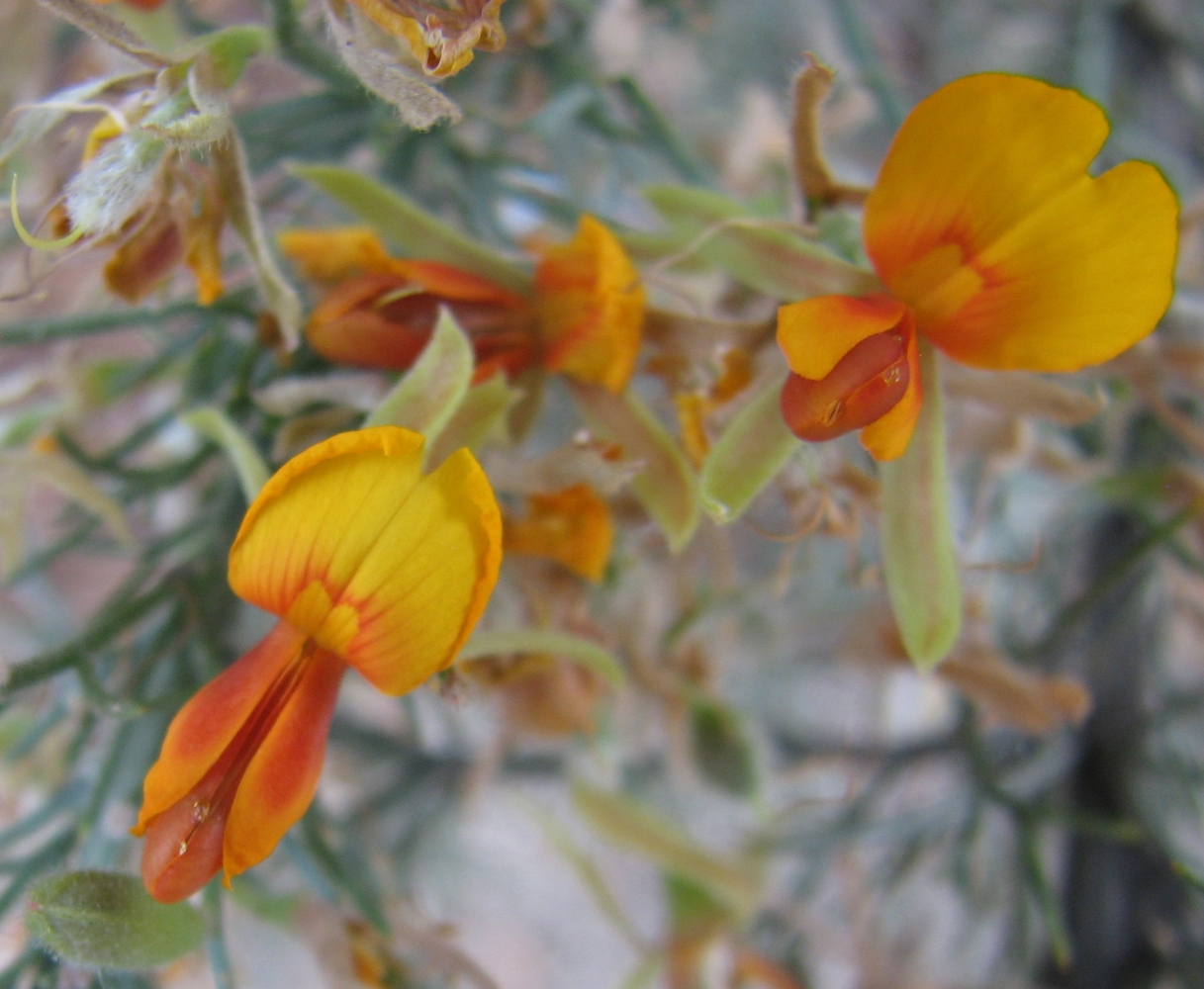

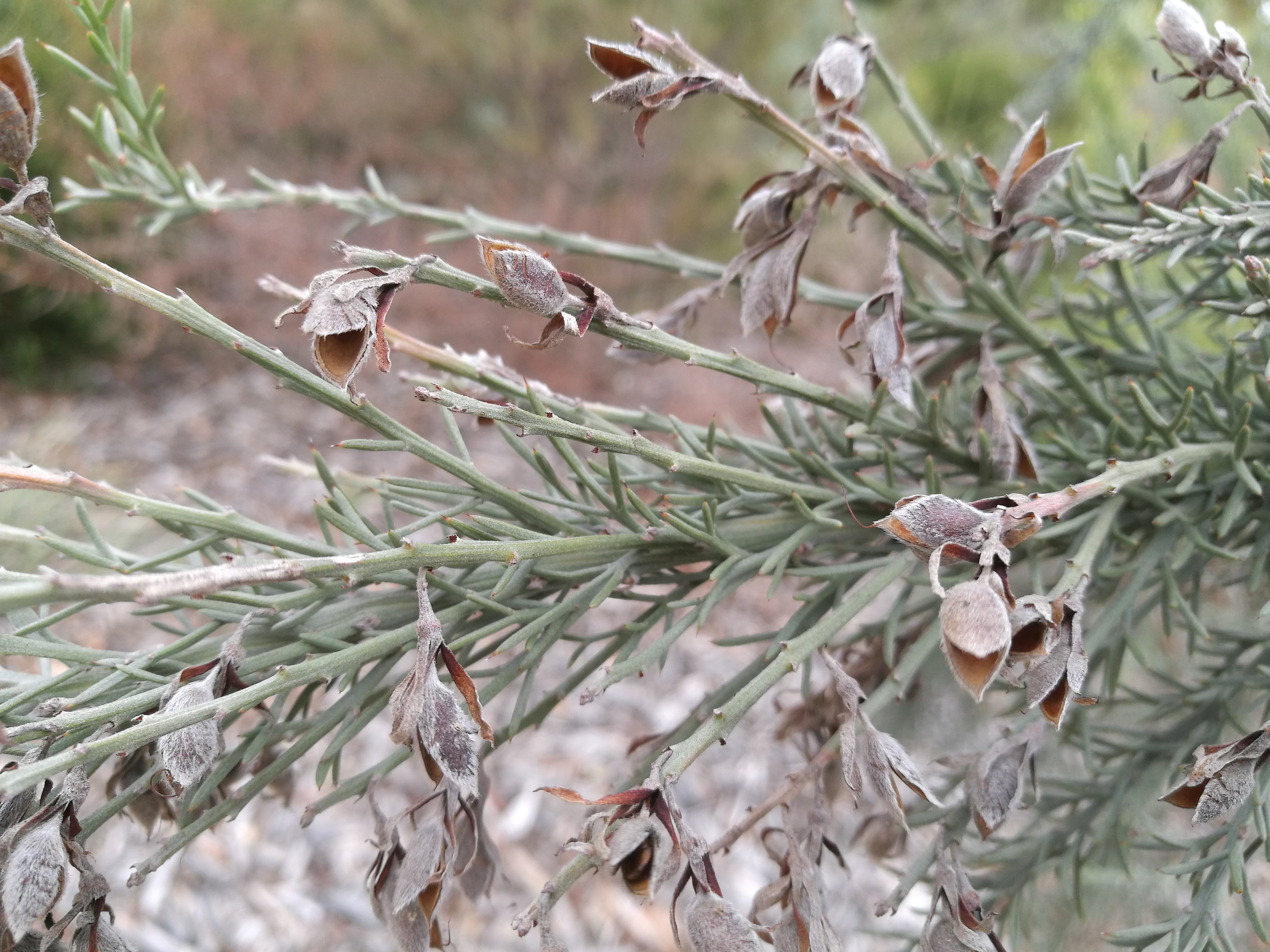

Scientific classification
- Kingdom: Plantae
- Clade: Tracheophytes
- Clade: Angiosperms
- Clade: Eudicots
- Clade: Rosids
- Order: Fabales
- Family: Fabaceae
- Subfamily: Faboideae
- Genus: Jacksonia
- Species: J. furcellata

Binomial name
- Jacksonia furcellata (Bonpl.) DC.

Synonyms
- Chorizema daviesioides var. preissianum Meisn.; Chorozema daviesioides var. preissianum Meisn. orth. var.; Gompholobium furcellatum Bonpl.; Jacksonia dumosa Meisn.; Jacksonia dumosa Meisn. var. dumosa; Piptomeris furcellata (Bonpl.) Greene

= Jacksonia furcellata =

Species of legume

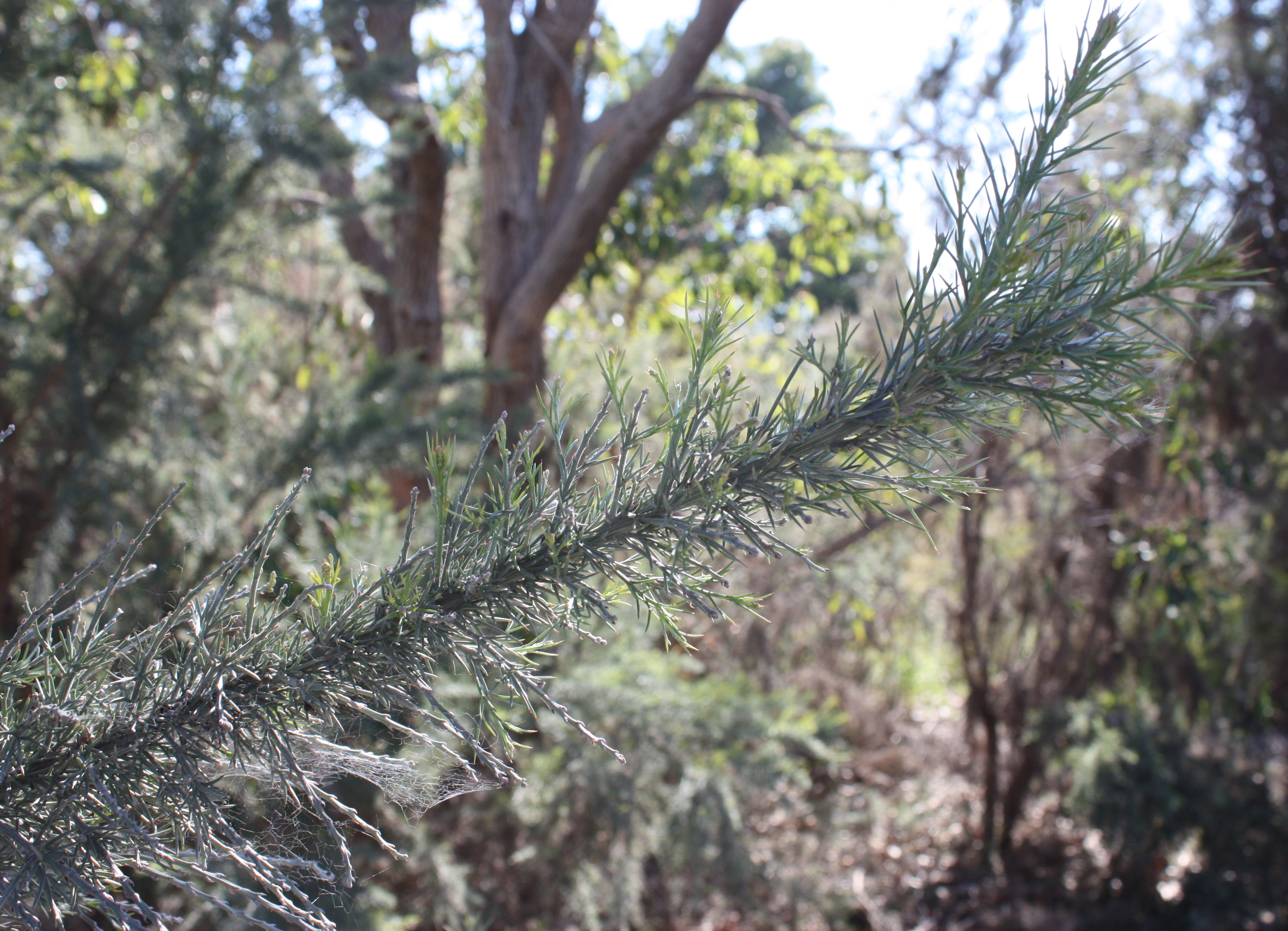
Foliage

Jacksonia furcellata, commonly known as grey stinkwood, is a species of flowering plant in the family Fabaceae and is endemic to the south-west of Western Australia. It is a prostrate to low-lying, or weeping erect shrub with greyish-green branches, sharply-pointed side branches, its leaves reduced to scales leaves, yellowish-orange flowers, and woody, hairy pods.

== Description ==
Jacksonia furcellata is prostrate to low-lying, or weeping, erect shrub, with sharply-pointed side branches that typically grows up to 0.4–6 m (1 ft 4 in – 19 ft 8 in) high and 1–3 m (3 ft 3 in – 9 ft 10 in) wide. It has greyish-green branches, the short end branches 2–15.8 mm (0.079–0.622 in) long, about 1.5 mm (0.059 in) wide and sharply-pointed. Its leaves are reduced to broadly egg-shaped scales with toothed edges, 1.2–3.9 mm (0.047–0.154 in) long and 0.6–1.8 mm (0.024–0.071 in) wide. The flowers are arranged on the ends of branches in raceme-like groups on a pedicel 2.3–4.7 mm (0.091–0.185 in) long. There are egg-shaped bracteoles 1.3–1.7 mm (0.051–0.067 in) long on the upper part of the pedicels. The floral tube is 1.0–1.4 mm (0.039–0.055 in) long and the sepals are membranous, with 7.5–12.3 mm (0.30–0.48 in) long and 1.6–2.4 mm (0.063–0.094 in) wide. The standard petal is yellowish-orange with red markings, 6.5–8.8 mm (0.26–0.35 in) long, the wings with a similar colour and 6.1–7.9 mm (0.24–0.31 in) long, and the keel is orange-red, 6.6–8.9 mm (0.26–0.35 in) long. The stamens have red filaments 5.2–11.9 mm (0.20–0.47 in) long. Flowering occurs throughout the year with a peak from October to December or January to March, and the fruit is a woody hairy, pod 7–8 mm (0.28–0.31 in) long and 3.5–4.0 mm (0.14–0.16 in) wide.

== Taxonomy ==
This species was first formally described in 1813 by Aimé Bonpland who gave it the name Gompholobium furcellatum in his Description des Plantes Rares cultivees a Malmaison et a Navarre. In 1825, Augustin Pyramus de Candolle transferred the species to Jacksonia as J. furcellata in his Prodromus Systematis Naturalis Regni Vegetabilis. The specific epithet (furcellata) means 'a small, two-pronged fork', referring to the branchlets.

== Distribution and habitat ==
Jacksonia furcellata grows in heath or woodland, often in winter-wet areas and is widespread between Dandaragan, the south-west corner of Western Australia, and east to the Lort River but absent for coastal areas between Augusta and Denmark, in the Avon Wheatbelt, Esperance Plains, Geraldton Sandplains, Jarrah Forest, Mallee, Swan Coastal Plain and Warren of south-western Western Australia.
