= Fridericia elegans =

Scientific classification
- Kingdom: Plantae
- Clade: Tracheophytes
- Clade: Angiosperms
- Clade: Eudicots
- Clade: Asterids
- Order: Lamiales
- Family: Bignoniaceae
- Genus: Fridericia
- Species: F. elegans

Binomial name
- Fridericia elegans (Vell.) L.G.Lohmann (2013)

Synonyms
- Bignonia elegans Vell. basionym; Bignonia exserta DC.; Adenocalymma elegans (Vell.) Mart. ex K. Schum.; Arrabidaea elegans (Vell.) A.H. Gentry; Phaedranthus extatus Miers; Pseudocalymma elegans (Vell.) Kuhlm.; Fridericia elegans (Vell.) L.G. Lohmann, 2010

Species of flowering plant

Fridericia elegans is a species of plants in the family Bignoniaceae. It is found in Brazil, where it is poisonous to livestock and has caused severe losses.
