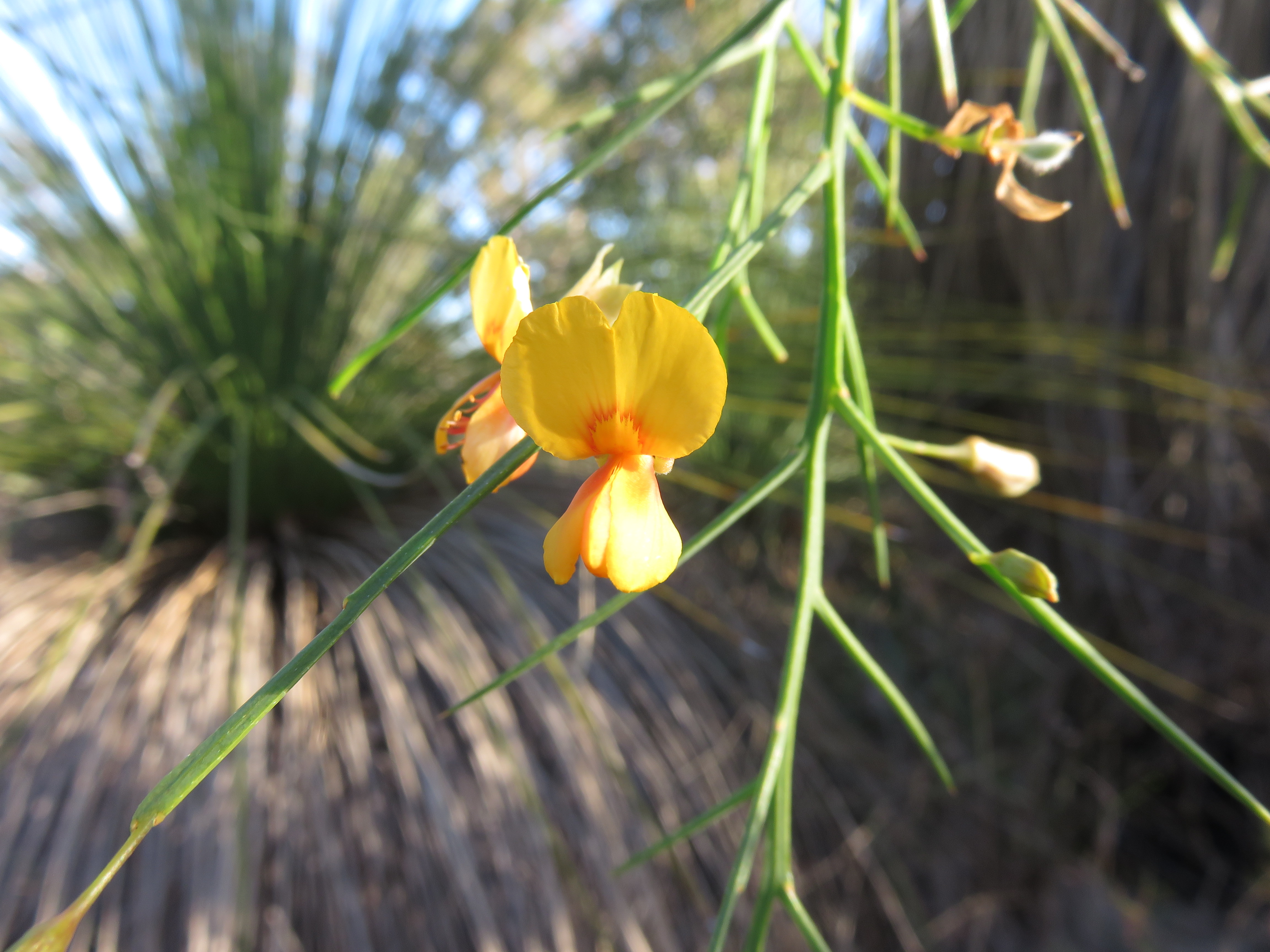

Scientific classification
- Kingdom: Plantae
- Clade: Tracheophytes
- Clade: Angiosperms
- Clade: Eudicots
- Clade: Rosids
- Order: Fabales
- Family: Fabaceae
- Subfamily: Faboideae
- Genus: Jacksonia
- Species: J. sternbergiana

Binomial name
- Jacksonia sternbergiana Benth.

Synonyms
- Jacksonia clarkii F.Muell.; Jacksonia sternbergiana f. alata E.Pritz.; Jacksonia sternbergiana f. horrida E.Pritz.; Jacksonia sternbergiana f. pungens E.Pritz.; Jacksonia sternbergiana Hügel ex Benth. f. sternbergiana; Jacksonia sternbergiana var. filicaulis Meisn.; Jacksonia sternbergiana Hügel ex Benth. var. sternbergiana; Piptomeris clarkii (F.Muell.) Greene; Piptomeris sternbergiana (Hügel ex Benth.) Greene

= Jacksonia sternbergiana =

Species of legume

Jacksonia sternbergiana, commonly known as stinkwood, is a species of flowering plant in the family Fabaceae and is endemic to the south-west of Western Australia. The Noongar peoples know the plant as kabbur, koorpa or mondurn. It is an erect or weeping shrub or tree with dull green branches, straight, sharply-pointed side branches, its leaves reduced to scales, yellowish-orange flowers, and woody, hairy pods.

== Description ==
Jacksonia sternbergiana is an erect or weeping shrub or small tree, that typically grows up to 1.5–5 m (4 ft 11 in – 16 ft 5 in) high and 1–3 m (3 ft 3 in – 9 ft 10 in) wide. It has dull green branches, the end branches 4–92 mm (0.16–3.62 in) long, 1–2 mm (0.039–0.079 in) wide and sharply-pointed. Its leaves are reduced to broadly egg-shaped, pale brown scales, 1.0–3.3 mm (0.039–0.130 in) long and 0.7–2.2 mm (0.028–0.087 in) wide. The flowers are scattered along the branches on a pedicel 5.5–8.3 mm (0.22–0.33 in) long, with lance-shaped bracteoles 0.6–1.2 mm (0.024–0.047 in) long on the middle of the pedicels. The floral tube is 1.3–1.4 mm (0.051–0.055 in) long and the sepals are membranous, with lobes 7.3–9.7 mm (0.29–0.38 in) long and 1.3–2.3 mm (0.051–0.091 in) wide. The flowers are yellow-orange with red markings, the standard petal is 8.9–10 mm (0.35–0.39 in) long, the wings 7.7–10 mm (0.30–0.39 in) long, and the keel 7.2–9 mm (0.28–0.35 in) long. The stamens have white filaments with red ends and 6–11.7 mm (0.24–0.46 in) long. Flowering occurs throughout the year, and the fruit is a woody, hairy pod 10–15.5 mm (0.39–0.61 in) long and 4.5–6.0 mm (0.18–0.24 in) wide.

== Taxonomy ==
Jacksonia sternbergiana was first formally described in 1837 by George Bentham in Botanisches Archiv der Gartenbaugesellschaft der Ossterreichischen Kaiserstaates from an unpublished manuscript by Charles von Hügel. The specific epithet (sternbergiana) honours Kaspar Maria von Sternberg.

== Distribution and habitat ==
This species of Jacksonia is widespread between Northampton and the Green Range in the Avon Wheatbelt, Geraldton Sandplains, Jarrah Forest, Mallee and Swan Coastal Plain bioregions of south-western Western Australia.

== Ecology ==
This plant provides food for the larvae of several species of butterfly, including the turquoise jewel, fringed heath-blue, and long-tailed pea-blue.
