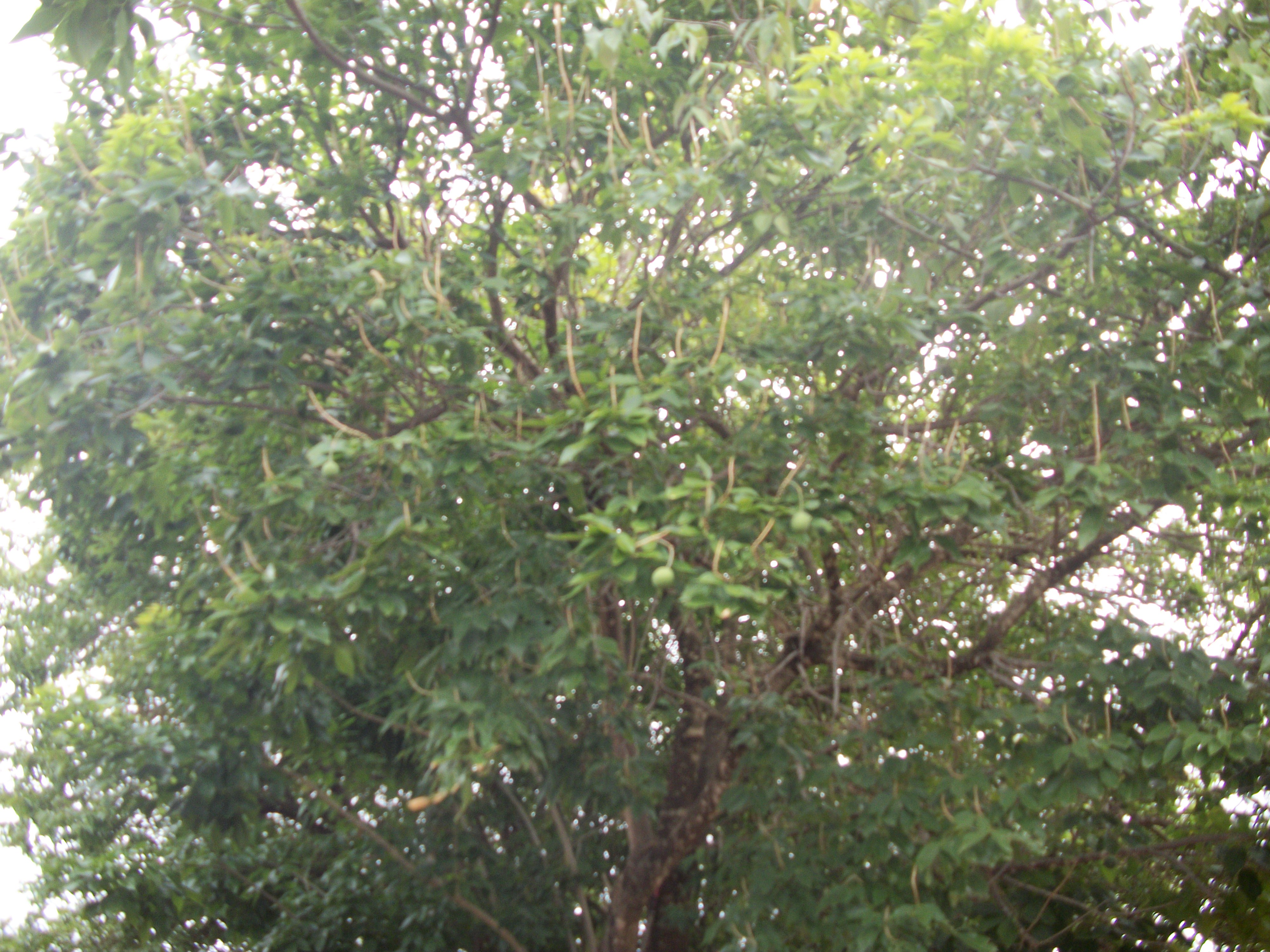

Scientific classification
- Kingdom: Plantae
- Clade: Tracheophytes
- Clade: Angiosperms
- Clade: Eudicots
- Clade: Rosids
- Order: Brassicales
- Family: Capparaceae
- Genus: Crateva
- Species: C. tapia

Binomial name
- Crateva tapia L.

Synonyms
- List: Capparis radiatiflora (DC.) Ruiz & Pav., no type indicated.; Capparis trifoliata Spreng. ex DC.; Colicodendron obliquifolium Turcz.; Crateva acuminata DC.; Crateva arborea Schrad.; Crateva bahiana Ule; Crateva benthamii Eichler; Crateva coriacea Herzog; Crateva glauca Lundell; Crateva gynandra L.; Crateva radiatiflora DC.; Crateva tapia var. glauca (Lundell) Standl. & Steyerm.; Crateva tapioides DC.; Nevosmila arborea (Schrad.) Raf.; Cleome arborea Schrad.

= Crateva tapia =

Species of plant

Crateva tapia, commonly known as toco, payaguá, naranjuelo, or beach apple, is a member of the genus Crateva, belonging to the family Capparaceae. It is native from Mexico through Central America into South America as far as south Brazil.

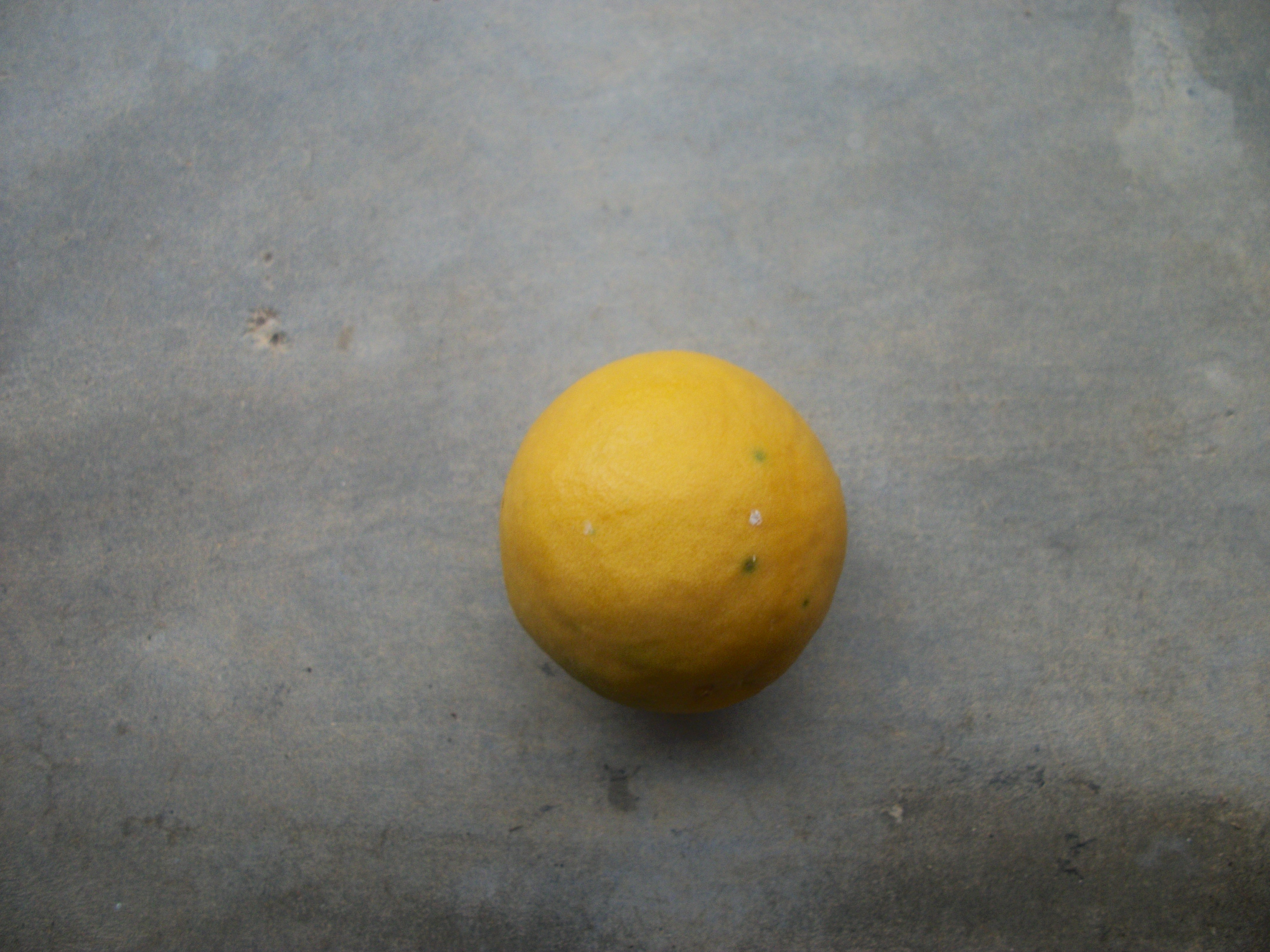
Detail of the fruit

== Description ==
They are trees or shrubs, reaching a size of 2–25 m in height, with a crown up to 20 m in diameter, bark opaque, light brown to grey, completely glabrous. Leaflets broad to narrowly elliptical to broadly ovate or obovate-elliptical, the lateral ones more or less obliquely asymmetrical, (3–) 8–13 (–18) cm long and 2–9 cm wide, apex long acuminate to rounded and abruptly acute, base cuneate to obtuse (or almost rounded) and gradual to abruptly attenuated towards the petiolules, glaucous or minutely papillose on the underside; petiolules very distinct, (4–) 6–10 mm long, petioles 5–15 cm long. Terminal inflorescences on the new leafy branches, flowers numbering 30–120, but only 10–20 bloom at the same time, raceme axes 6–16 cm long and 5–10 mm wide, bracts linear-lanceolate, up to 9 mm long, rapidly deciduous, pedicels 20–32 mm long; sepals lanceolate to oblong or ovate, acute, free part of the limb ca 5–9 mm long and 2–3 mm wide; petals 10–45 mm long and 3–7 mm wide, the blade 8–30 (–35) mm long and 3–7 (–13) mm wide, white to greenish white and when wilting cream, pink or pale purple, claw 5–11 mm long; stamens 14–20, filaments ca 35–46 mm long, tiny in pistillate flowers; gynophore 29–54 mm long or only up to 1–5 mm in staminate flowers. Infructescence of the leafy branches 6–18 cm long and 5–10 mm wide, the pedicel scars well spaced.

The fruit is a globular to oblong or ovoid berry, 4–9 cm long and 3.5–6.5 cm wide, turning yellow to orange or pink, pericarp 4–6 mm when immature and 1–2 mm when mature, filled with a fleshy pulp, gynophores 30–50 (–70) mm long and 3–4 mm wide, pedicels 20–60 mm long; seeds numerous, dark colored, 8–9 mm long, 6–7 mm wide and 3–4 mm thick. The pulp of sandy consistency is edible, with a sweet-sour taste.

== Taxonomy ==
Crataeva tapia was described by Carl Linnaeus and published in Species Plantarum 1: 444. 1753.

== Distribution and habitat ==
Crataeva tapia is widely distributed from Mexico to south Brazil. It is a common species in dry forests and disturbed sandy soil areas, at all zones; at an altitude of 0–500 (–1000) m; fl (Dec–) Feb–Jun, fr Feb–Sep (Dec); a highly variable species. When growing in dry environments, it is very similar to C. palmeri with which it is apparently sympatric and possibly hybrid, but it is differentiated by the leaves or inflorescence axes being glabrous, the flowers white, and the leaflets pediculate.
