= Nenga =

Scientific classification
- Kingdom: Plantae
- Clade: Tracheophytes
- Clade: Angiosperms
- Clade: Monocots
- Clade: Commelinids
- Order: Arecales
- Family: Arecaceae
- Subfamily: Arecoideae
- Tribe: Areceae
- Subtribe: Arecinae
- Genus: Nenga; H. Wendl. & Drude

Genus of palms

Nenga is a monoecious genus of flowering plant in the palm family. It is native to Southeast Asia and commonly called pinang palm. The genus name is based on a corruption of a Javanese term for a plant now classified within Pinanga.

== Description ==
Their trunks may be clustering or solitary from 5 to 15 cm wide, rarely exceeding 5 m in height. The stems are ringed by distinct leaf scars and frequently supported by stilt roots. A distinct crownshaft is present in all but N. gajah, the petioles are well developed and bear pinnate leaves up to 2 m long. The leaflets are closely to widely spaced, regularly arranged, with one to several folds. They may be acute to acuminate, S-shaped to linear, the terminal pair usually obscurely lobed corresponding to the fold count; reaching 90 cm, they are usually deep green with a lighter underside. The rachis, petiole and crownshaft may be lightly to densely covered in hairy, brown tomentum.

The inflorescence is branched to one order, rarely to two, erect or pendulous, and emerges below the crownshaft in all but N. gajah which emerges within the leaf crown. The fleshy male and female flowers share the same branches, proximally arranged in triads and distally in pairs or singles. They produce an obpyriform to ovoid fruit with a thin, fleshy mesocarp and a fibrous endocarp. Colored red, purple or black the fruit carries one seed.

N. gajah is the aberration in the genus with its short internodes, marcescent leaves and interfoliar inflorescence, a combination of traits seen in a few species of the closely related Pinanga and Areca palms.

== Distribution and habitat ==
From southern Vietnam, peninsular Malaysia, Thailand, Borneo, Sumatra, Java, Nenga palms are purely tropical found in rain forest to 1400 m. N. pumila is also found in peat swamp forest.

Species

- Nenga banaensis (Magalon) Burret - Vietnam
- Nenga gajah J.Dransf - Sabah, Sumatra
- Nenga grandiflora Fernando - Johor
- Nenga macrocarpa Scort. ex Becc. - southern Thailand, Peninsular Malaysia
- Nenga pumila (Blume) H.Wendl. - southern Thailand, Peninsular Malaysia, Borneo, Java, Sumatra
