= Areca jokowi =

Conservation status
- Vulnerable (IUCN 3.1)

Scientific classification
- Kingdom: Plantae
- Clade: Tracheophytes
- Clade: Angiosperms
- Clade: Monocots
- Clade: Commelinids
- Order: Arecales
- Family: Arecaceae
- Genus: Areca
- Species: A. jokowi

Binomial name
- Areca jokowi Heatubun

Species of palm

Areca jokowi is a palm in the family Arecaceae. It is native to New Guinea.

== Description ==
Areca jokowi grows up to 15 m (50 ft) tall, with a single stem of diameter up to 8 cm (3 in). The crown has nine leaves, each measuring up to 93 cm (37 in) long, including a petiole up to 6 cm (2.4 in) length. The inflorescence is up to 60 cm (24 in) long, spreading wide (divaricate). The ovoid fruit measures up to 3.5 cm (1.4 in) long. This species is most similar to Areca catechu, A. mandacanii and A. unipa. It is locally used as a betel nut substitute.

== Taxonomy ==
Areca jokowi was described by Indonesian botanist Charlie Danny Heatubun in Phytotaxa in 2016. The described species was cultivated near Yamur Lake in Kaimana Regency of Southwest Papua province from seeds gathered in nearby hill forest at Mount Daweri. The species is named for then Indonesian President Joko Widodo (Jokowi).

== Distribution and habitat ==
Areca jokowi is endemic to western New Guinea, where it is confined to Kaimana Regency. Its habitat is in hill forests, at elevations of about 300 m (1,000 ft).

== Conservation ==
Areca jokowi has been assessed as vulnerable on the IUCN Red List. Its natural habitat is within a logging concession, which if activated could lead to the species' extinction. The size of its natural population is unknown, however it has been successfully cultivated elsewhere in the region. It is not known to be present in any protected areas.
