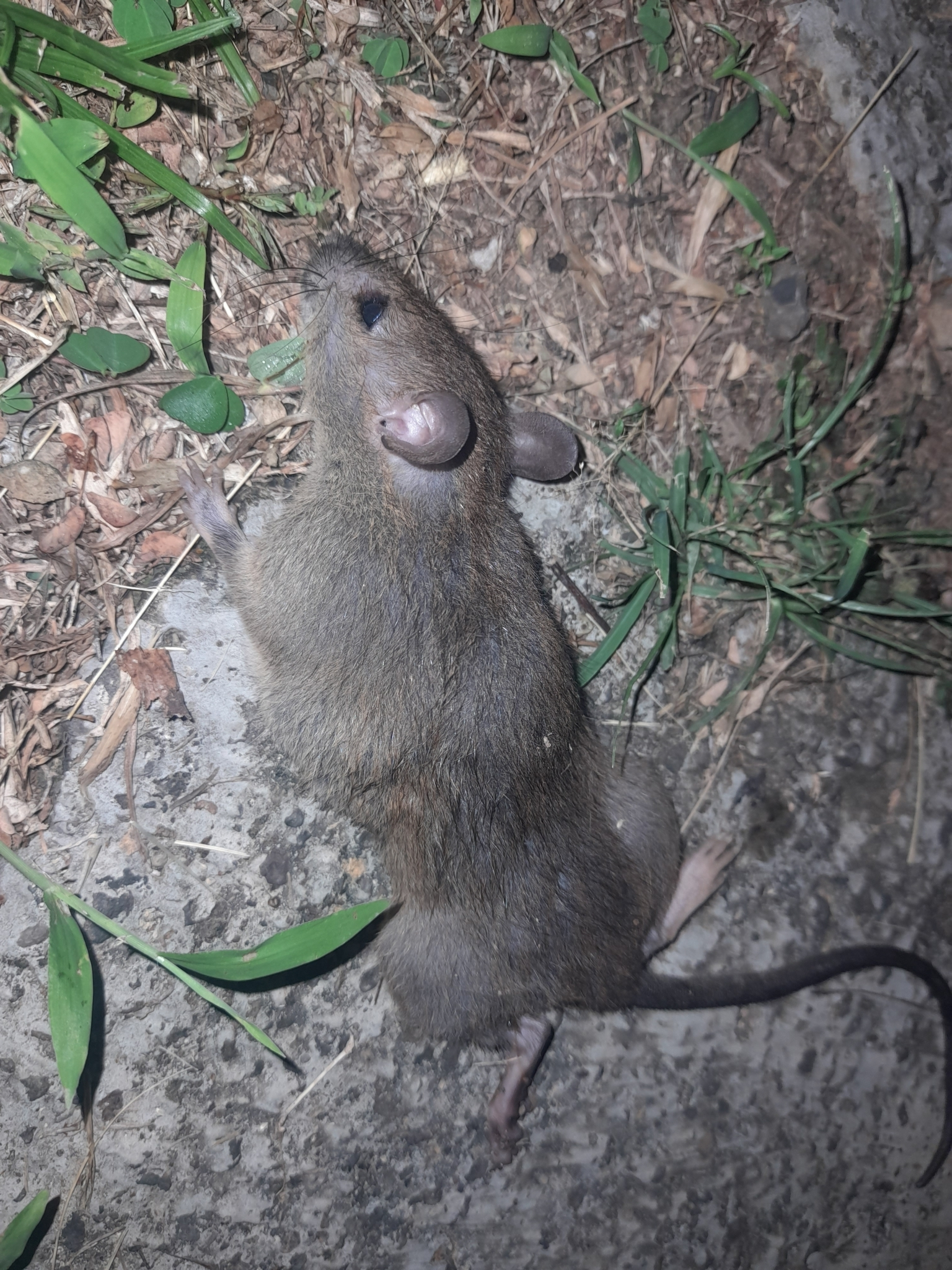

Conservation status
- Least Concern (IUCN 3.1)

Scientific classification
- Kingdom: Animalia
- Phylum: Chordata
- Class: Mammalia
- Order: Rodentia
- Family: Muridae
- Genus: Rattus
- Species: R. hoffmanni

Binomial name
- Rattus hoffmanni (Matschie, 1901)

= Hoffmann's rat =

Species of rodent

Hoffmann's rat (Rattus hoffmanni) is a species of rodent in the family Muridae. It is found only in Indonesia, and is located throughout Sulawesi, as well as Malenge island in the Togian Islands.

== Description ==
R. hoffmanni is nocturnal, often sheltering in dense foliage. Each eye has a black ring. The feet are brown dorsally. The ears are large, rubbery, and grey-brown. The vibrissae are long and black. Juveniles are both darker and softer than adults.

Measurements of the species:

- Head-body is 142–211 mm
- Tail is 145–210 mm
- Ear is 20–25 mm
- Hindfoot is 35–42 mm
- Weight is 90–250 g

== Diet ==
R. hoffmanni primarily eat a variety of plants, though also have been found to have eaten various insects, possibly from eating figs.

Here are the stomach contents of a R. hoffmanni:

- Insects (fruitflies, beetles, and sclerites)
- Pulp and seeds of figs
- Some stems and leaves
- Eugenia
- Areca vestiaria

== Habitat ==
R. hoffmanni will live in lowlands, montane tropical cool and moist forests, and around streams.
