= Pinanga sylvestris =

Conservation status
- Least Concern (IUCN 3.1)

Scientific classification
- Kingdom: Plantae
- Clade: Tracheophytes
- Clade: Angiosperms
- Clade: Monocots
- Clade: Commelinids
- Order: Arecales
- Family: Arecaceae
- Genus: Pinanga
- Species: P. sylvestris

Binomial name
- Pinanga sylvestris (Lour.) Hodel, Palm J. 139: 55 (1998).

Synonyms
- Areca sylvestris Lour.; Pinanga chinensis Becc.; Pinanga cochinchinensis Blume; Pinanga duperreana Pierre ex Becc.; Pinanga macroclada Burret; Ptychosperma cochinchinense (Blume) Miq.; Ptychosperma sylvestris (Lour.) Miq.; Seaforthia cochinchinensis (Blume) Mart.; Seaforthia sylvestris (Lour.) Blume ex Mart.

Species of palm

Pinanga sylvestris is a species of tree in the palm family, Arecaceae. It grows 2–6 m tall, sometimes in bundles, shade tolerant, from Meghalaya (India) to Thailand, Cambodia, Vietnam, Laos and Zhōngguó/China. In Thailand it is recorded in the Khao Soi Dao Wildlife Sanctuary, in Chanthaburi Province, as a very common mid-storey tree in the Quercus semiserrata-dominated rainforest at 1,400 to 1,540 m. In Cambodia it occurs uncommonly in coastal vegetation communities, but is common in dense and semi-dense evergreen rainforest in the lowlands and at moderate altitude. The palm grows in similar dense and semi-dense communities in Laos and Vietnam. On the mountain of Ngọc Linh in Quảng Nam Province of Vietnam, it dominates the ground layer of low montane broadleaf evergreen forest, that occurs from 150 to 1000m.

In Cambodia, the palm is given the names sla snga:b (sla=palm/areca, snga:b=yawn, Lewitz & Rollet give it as sla sngap, this sort grows in coastal forests), sla khmau (khau=black, Lewitz & Rollet give sla tourlieng as another name for this variety) and sla kânndaôr (kânndaôr=mouse, Haynes & McLaughlin give the name as sla condor). The fruit of all of these Cambodian palms may replace areca nut in the betel quid, and sometimes the sla snga:b variety are used as bait in fishing, while the sla khmau and kânndaôr types have their terminal bud and pith of the trunk harvested for food. In Zhongguo/China a common name is hua shan zhu (Pinyin).
