= Areca chaiana =

Conservation status
- Data Deficient (IUCN 2.3)

Scientific classification
- Kingdom: Plantae
- Clade: Tracheophytes
- Clade: Angiosperms
- Clade: Monocots
- Clade: Commelinids
- Order: Arecales
- Family: Arecaceae
- Genus: Areca
- Species: A. chaiana

Binomial name
- Areca chaiana J.Dransf.

Species of palm

Areca chaiana is a species of flowering plant in the family Arecaceae. It is a tree endemic to Borneo. It is threatened by habitat loss but occurs in Lanjak Entimau Wildlife Sanctuary and Semengoh Arboretum near Kuching, Sarawak.
