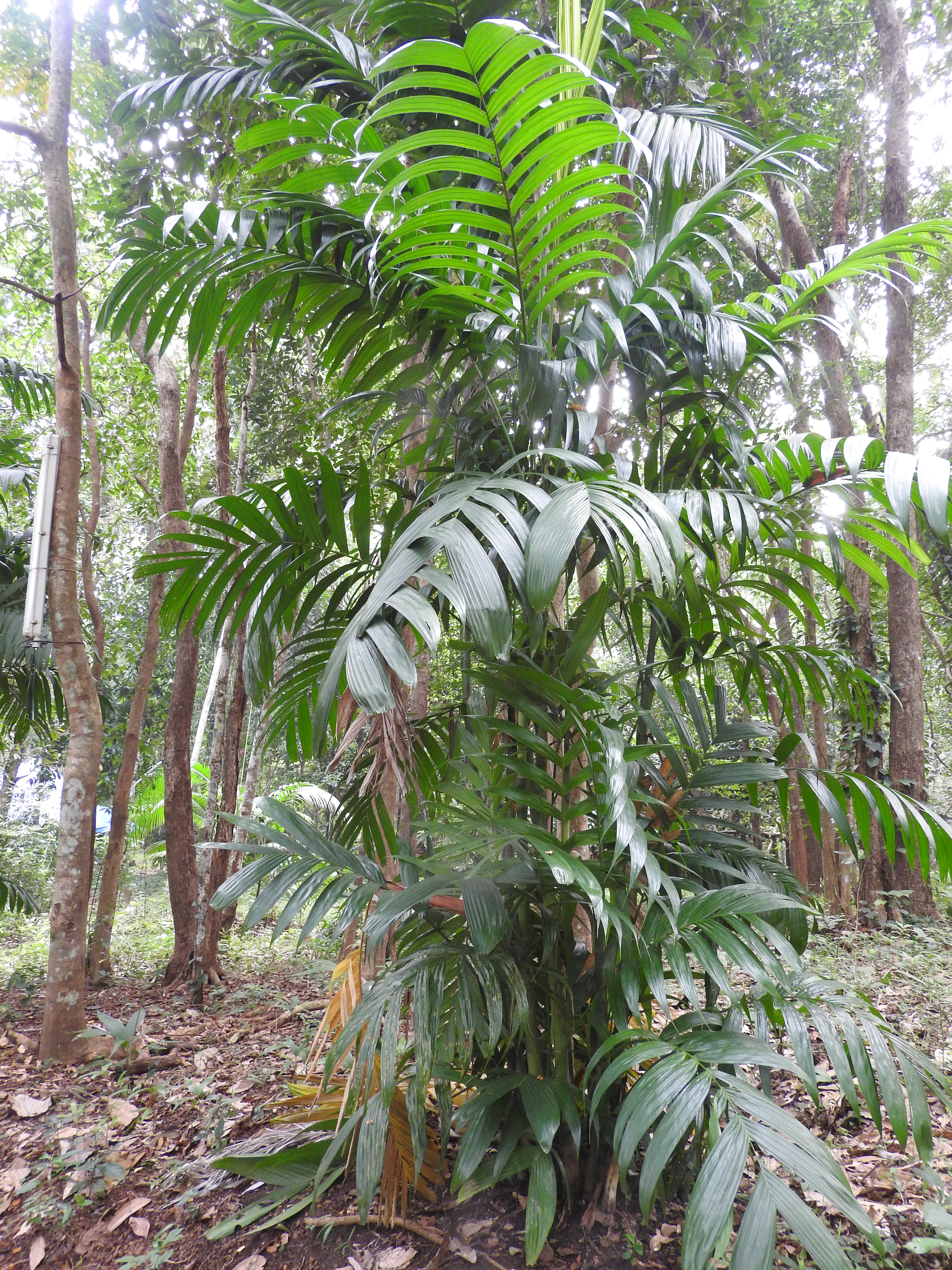
- In Kerala, India

Conservation status
- Least Concern (IUCN 3.1)

Scientific classification
- Kingdom: Plantae
- Clade: Tracheophytes
- Clade: Angiosperms
- Clade: Monocots
- Clade: Commelinids
- Order: Arecales
- Family: Arecaceae
- Genus: Areca
- Species: A. triandra

Binomial name
- Areca triandra Roxb. ex Buch.-Ham.

Synonyms
- Areca aliceae W.Hill ex F.Muell.; Areca borneensis Becc.; Areca humilis Blanco ex H.Wendl.; Areca laxa Buch.-Ham.; Areca nagensis Griff.; Areca polystachya (Miq.) H.Wendl.; Nenga nagensis (Griff.) Scheff.; Ptychosperma polystachyum Miq.

= Areca triandra =

Species of palm

Areca triandra, the wild areca palm, is a palm which is often used as ornamental plant. It is native to India, Bangladesh, Cambodia, Laos, Burma, Thailand, Vietnam, Malaysia, Indonesia, and the Philippines. It is also reportedly naturalized in Hawaii, Panama, Sri Lanka and southern China. As a wild plant, it commonly occurs in littoral forest in Southeast Asia.

== Gallery ==
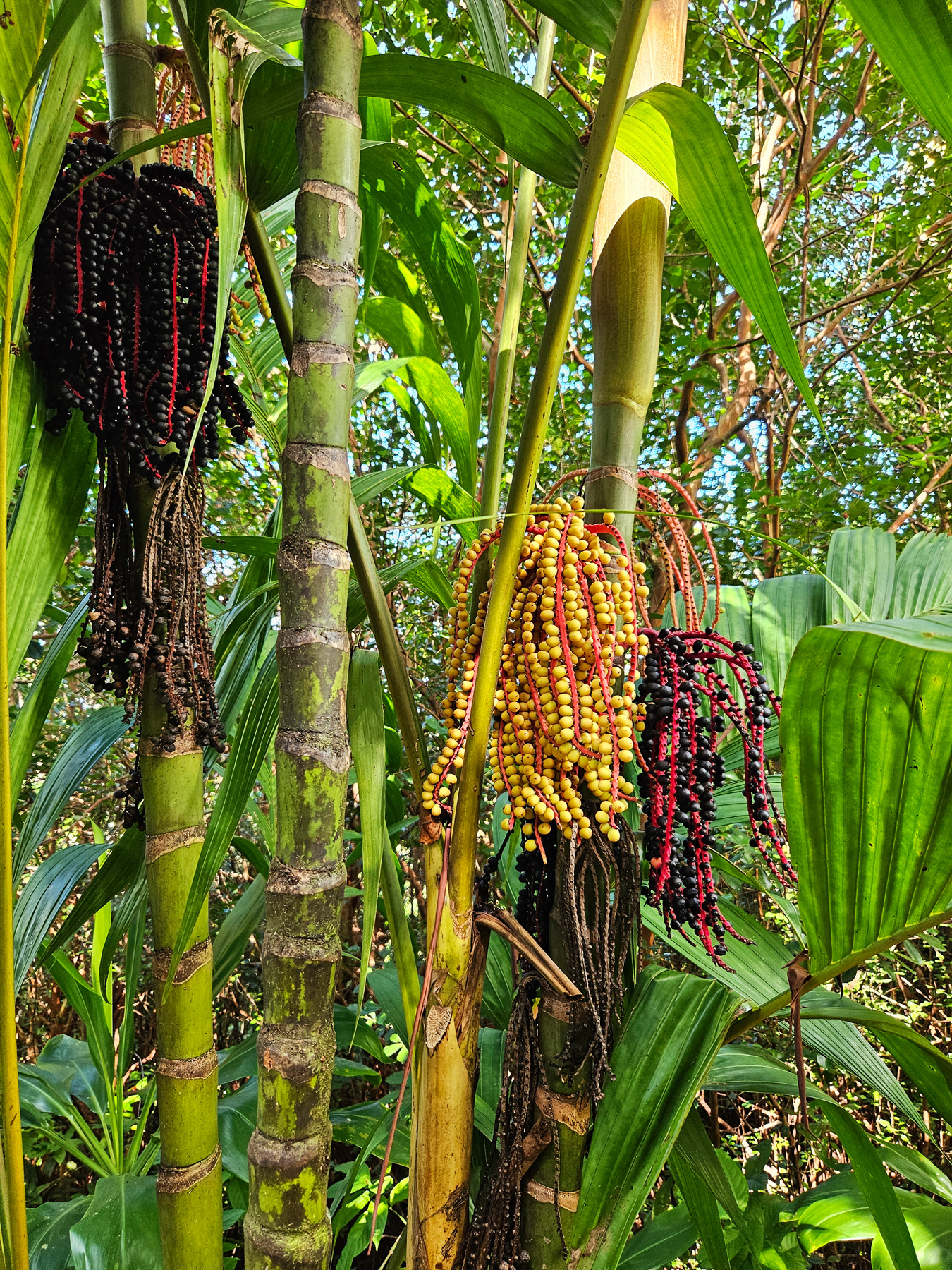
Areca triandra Roxb. ex Buch.-Ham., Hawaii

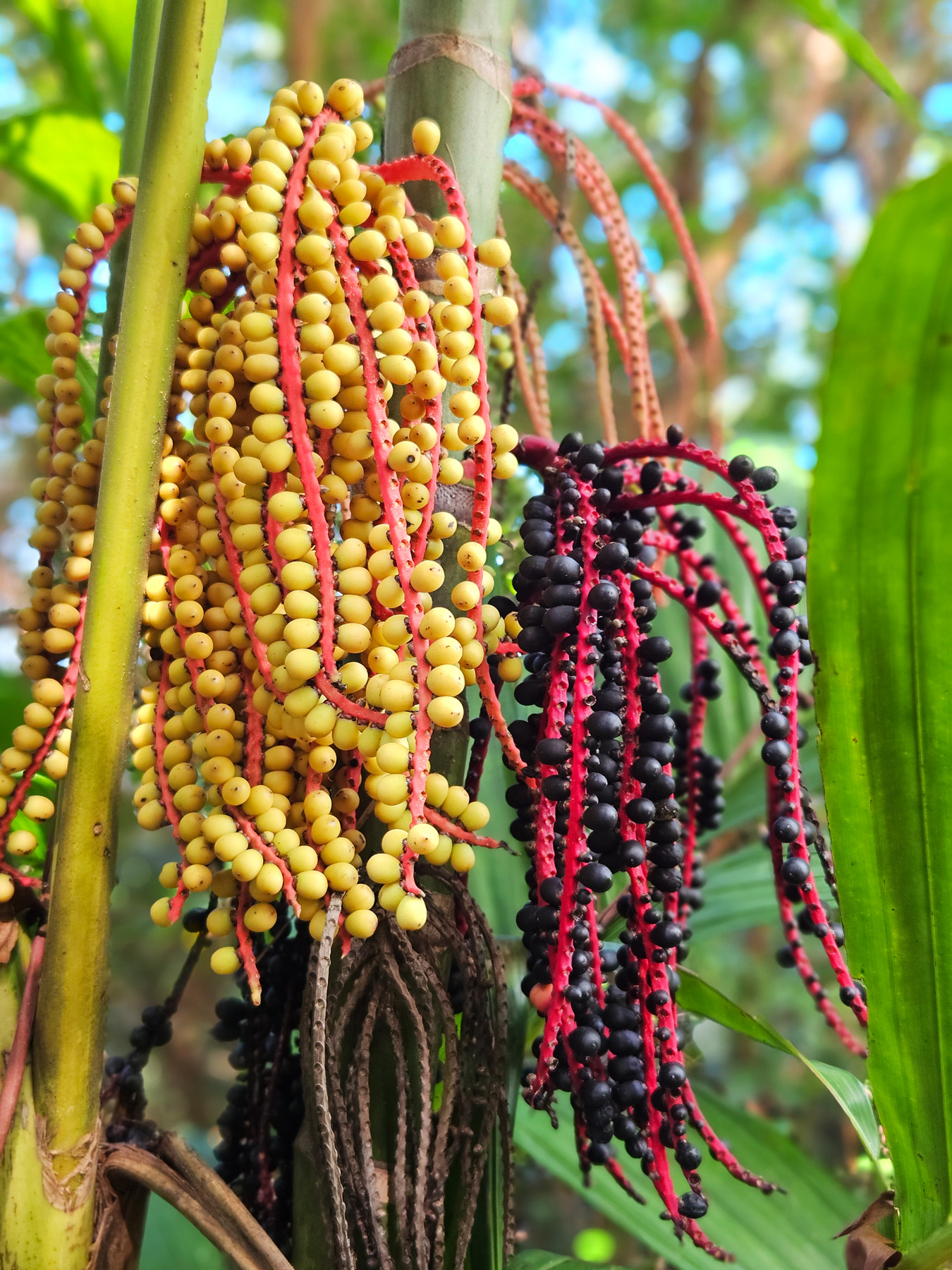
Areca triandra Roxb. ex Buch.-Ham.

== Ethnobotany ==
A name for this palm is sla: préi in Khmer. In Cambodia, the nut may be chewed with betel in a quid, while the timber is used for temporary constructions, such as huts.
