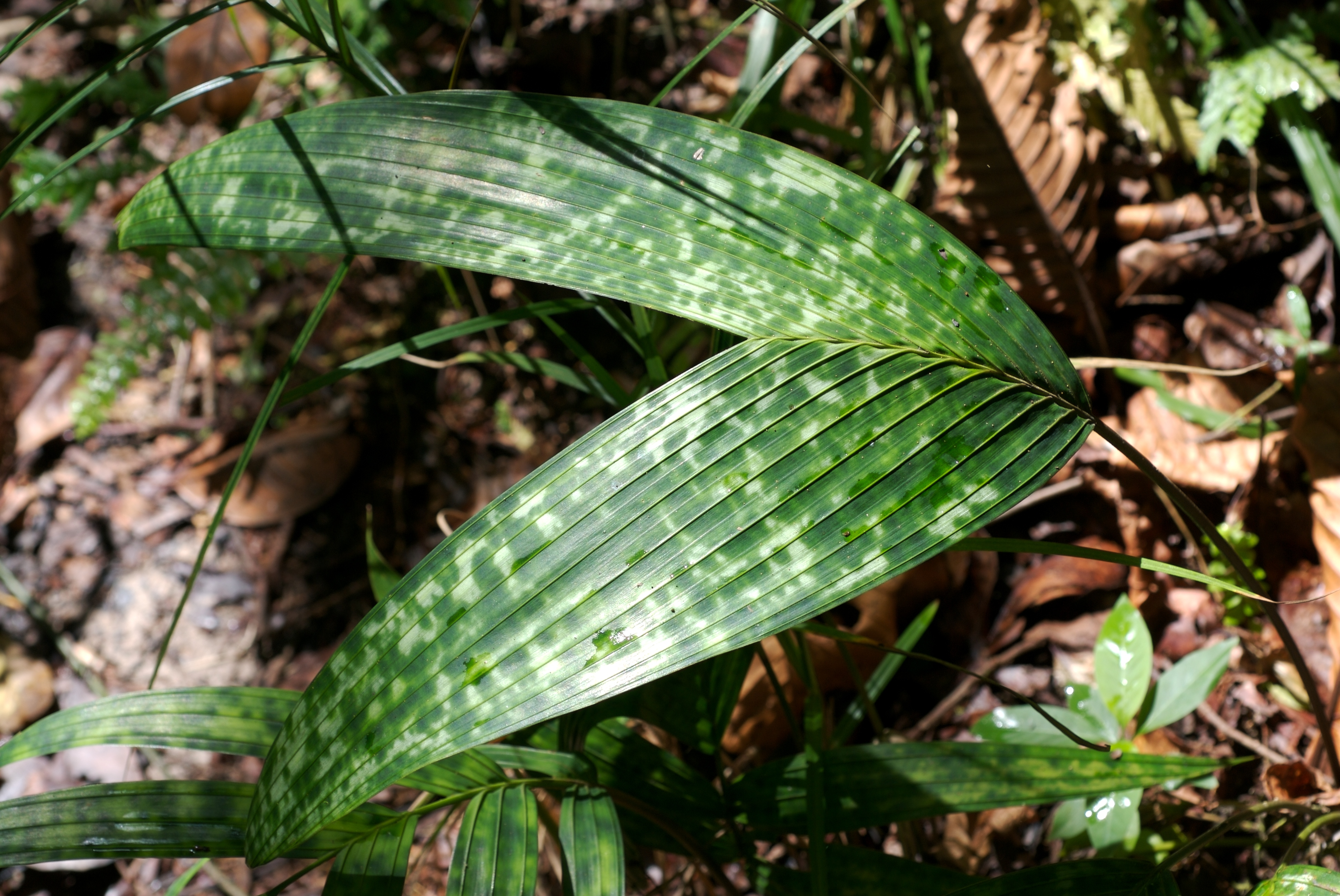

Scientific classification
- Kingdom: Plantae
- Clade: Tracheophytes
- Clade: Angiosperms
- Clade: Monocots
- Clade: Commelinids
- Order: Arecales
- Family: Arecaceae
- Genus: Pinanga
- Species: P. crassipes

Binomial name
- Pinanga crassipes Becc.

= Pinanga crassipes =

Species of palm

Pinanga crassipes is a species of palm tree in the family Arecaceae. It is endemic to Borneo.
