= Areca parens =

Conservation status
- Endangered (IUCN 3.1)

Scientific classification
- Kingdom: Plantae
- Clade: Tracheophytes
- Clade: Angiosperms
- Clade: Monocots
- Clade: Commelinids
- Order: Arecales
- Family: Arecaceae
- Genus: Areca
- Species: A. parens

Binomial name
- Areca parens Becc.

Species of palm

Areca parens is a species of flowering plant in the family Arecaceae. It is found only on the island of Luzon in the Philippines. It is threatened by habitat loss and listed on the IUCN Red List as Endangered.
