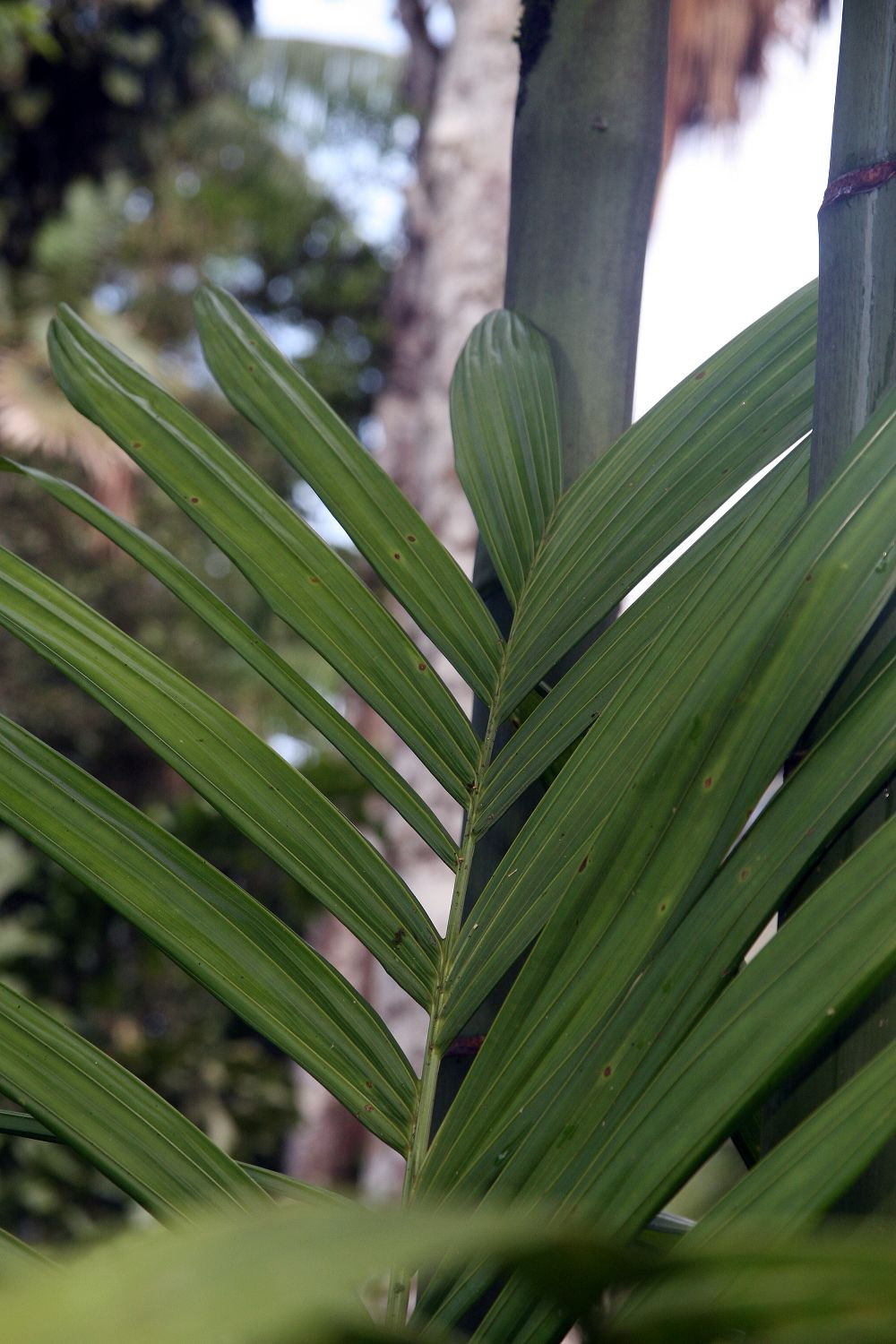

Conservation status
- Endangered (IUCN 2.3)

Scientific classification
- Kingdom: Plantae
- Clade: Tracheophytes
- Clade: Angiosperms
- Clade: Monocots
- Clade: Commelinids
- Order: Arecales
- Family: Arecaceae
- Genus: Areca
- Species: A. concinna

Binomial name
- Areca concinna Thwaites

= Areca concinna =

Species of palm

Areca concinna is a species of flowering plant in the family Arecaceae. It is palm shrub or tree found only in Sri Lanka. It is threatened by habitat loss.
