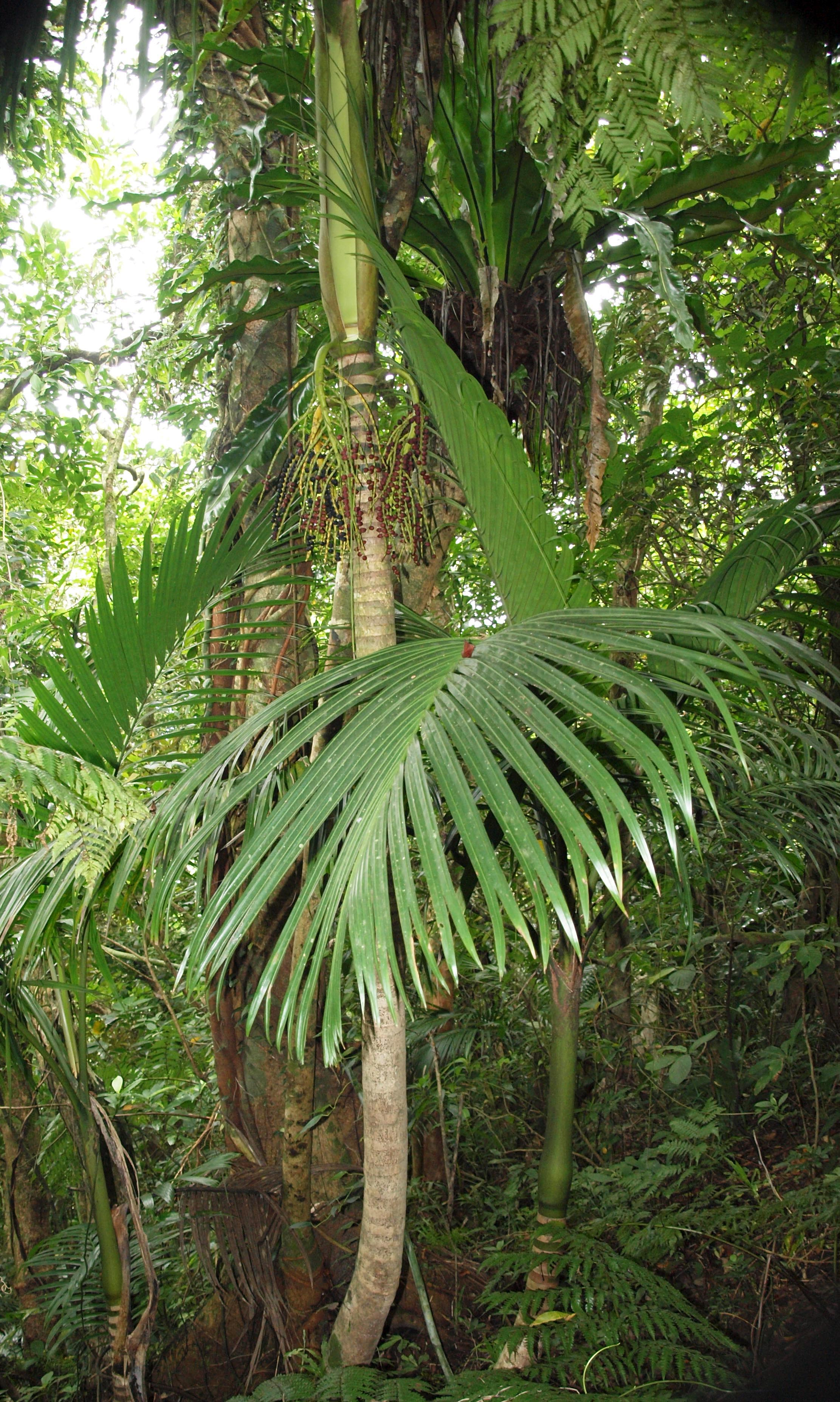

Conservation status
- Critically Endangered (IUCN 3.1)

Scientific classification
- Kingdom: Plantae
- Clade: Tracheophytes
- Clade: Angiosperms
- Clade: Monocots
- Clade: Commelinids
- Order: Arecales
- Family: Arecaceae
- Genus: Pinanga
- Species: P. tashiroi

Binomial name
- Pinanga tashiroi Hayata

= Pinanga tashiroi =

Species of palm

Pinanga tashiroi is a species of palm tree in the family Arecaceae. It is a small tree, up to 5 m (16 ft) tall, swollen at base. It is a critically endangered species.

== Distribution ==
Pinanga tashiroi is found only on Orchid Island (Lan Yu) off the southeastern coast of Taiwan; it is thus endemic to Taiwan.

Its natural habitat is lowland rain forest below 500 m (1,600 ft).
