= Areca whitfordii =

Conservation status
- Vulnerable (IUCN 3.1)

Scientific classification
- Kingdom: Plantae
- Clade: Tracheophytes
- Clade: Angiosperms
- Clade: Monocots
- Clade: Commelinids
- Order: Arecales
- Family: Arecaceae
- Genus: Areca
- Species: A. whitfordii

Binomial name
- Areca whitfordii Becc.

Species of palm

Areca whitfordii is a species of flowering plant in the family Arecaceae. It is endemic to the Philippines. It is threatened by habitat loss.
