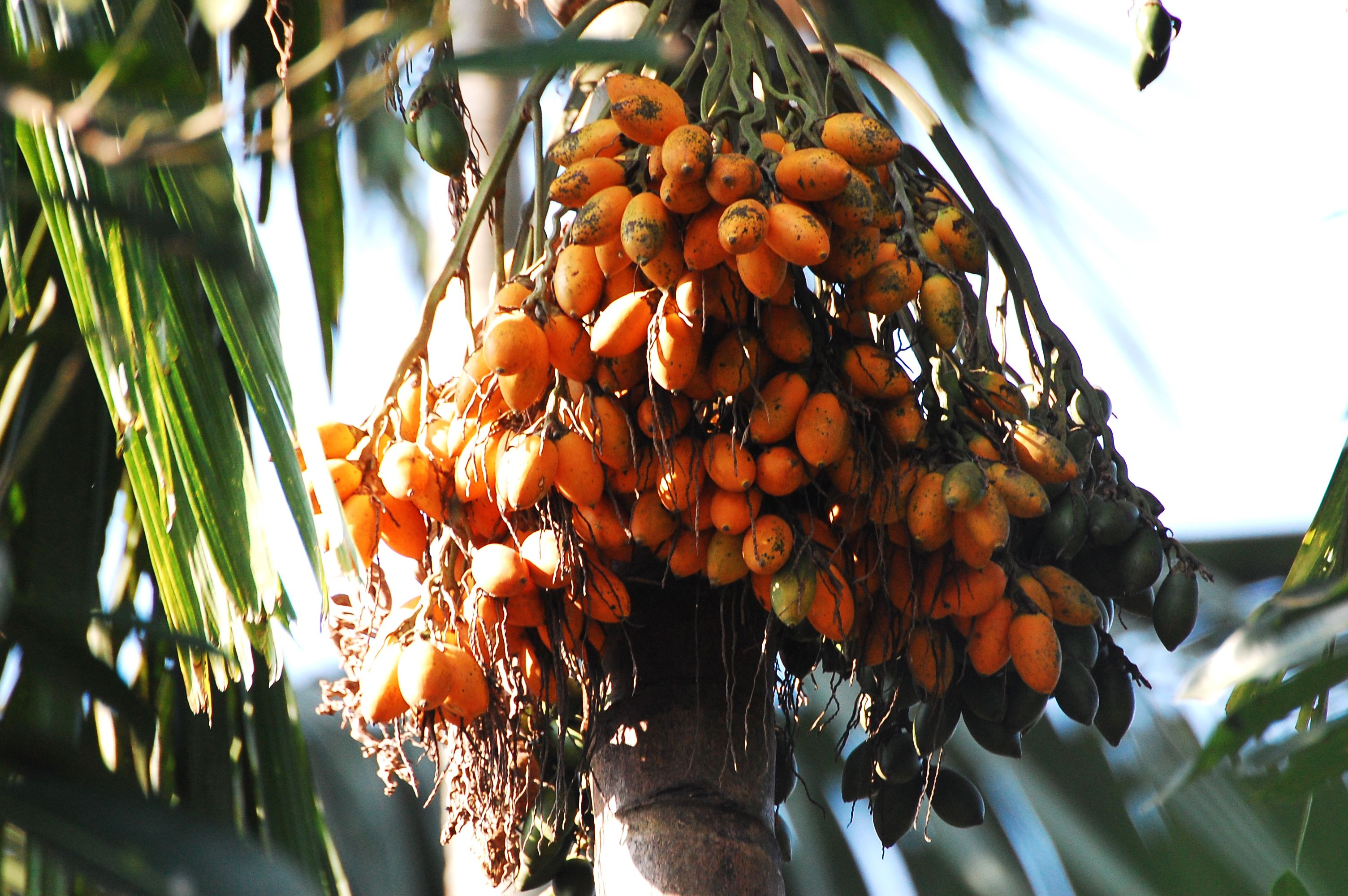
- Areca catechu

Scientific classification
- Kingdom: Plantae
- Clade: Tracheophytes
- Clade: Angiosperms
- Clade: Monocots
- Clade: Commelinids
- Order: Arecales
- Family: Arecaceae
- Subfamily: Arecoideae
- Tribe: Areceae
- Subtribe: Arecinae

Genera
- Areca; Nenga; Pinanga

= Arecinae =

Species of palm

Arecinae is a palm tree subtribe in the tribe Areceae.

Genera:

- Areca
- Nenga
- Pinanga
