= Pinanga purpurea =

Scientific classification
- Kingdom: Plantae
- Clade: Tracheophytes
- Clade: Angiosperms
- Clade: Monocots
- Clade: Commelinids
- Order: Arecales
- Family: Arecaceae
- Genus: Pinanga
- Species: P. purpurea

Binomial name
- Pinanga purpurea Hendra

Species of palm

Pinanga purpurea is a species of palm tree in the family Arecaceae. It is endemic to Sumatra.

The species was described in 2002. The name Pinanga purpurea had previously applied by Miquel in 1861 to another species, now called Cyrtostachys renda. Miquel's name, however, was listed as a synonym without description, hence not validly published. Therefore, Hendra's 2002 name stands as a legitimate name, not a homonym.
