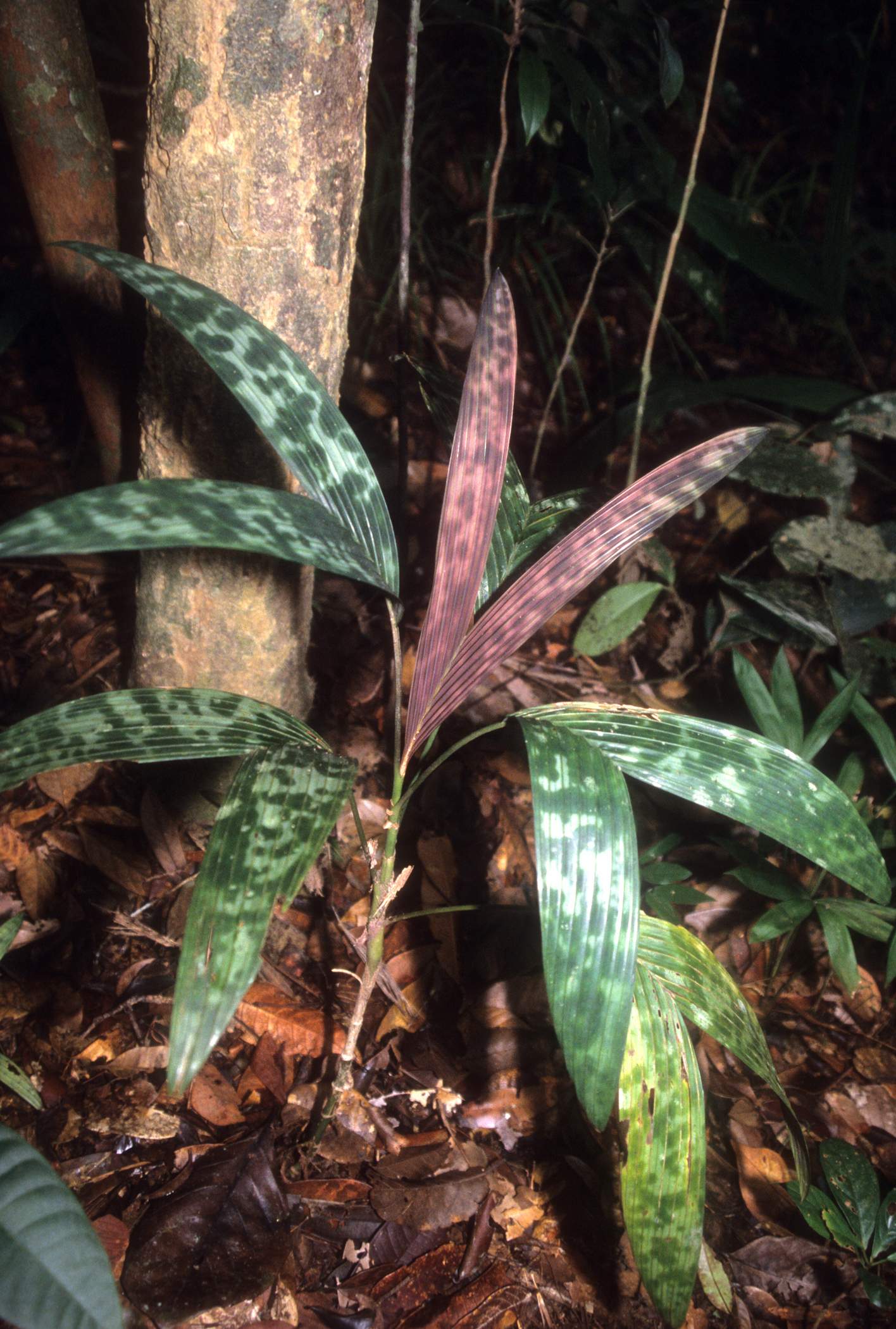
- At Jengai, Terengganu, Malaysia

Scientific classification
- Kingdom: Plantae
- Clade: Embryophytes
- Clade: Tracheophytes
- Clade: Angiosperms
- Clade: Monocots
- Clade: Commelinids
- Order: Arecales
- Family: Arecaceae
- Genus: Pinanga
- Species: P. disticha

Binomial name
- Pinanga disticha (Roxb.) Blume ex H.Wendl.

= Pinanga disticha =

Palm in Southeast Asia

Pinanga disticha is a species of palm in the family Arecaceae that is native to southern Thailand, the Malay Peninsula, and Sumatra. It is best known for its foliage; the young leaves are dark pink with light pink markings, and older leaves are green with white markings.
