= Areca macrocalyx =

Conservation status
- Least Concern (IUCN 3.1)

Scientific classification
- Kingdom: Plantae
- Clade: Tracheophytes
- Clade: Angiosperms
- Clade: Monocots
- Clade: Commelinids
- Order: Arecales
- Family: Arecaceae
- Genus: Areca
- Species: A. macrocalyx

Binomial name
- Areca macrocalyx Zipp. ex Blume

Synonyms
- List: Areca congesta Becc.; Areca jobiensis Becc.; Areca ledermanniana Becc.; Areca multifida Burret; Areca nannospadix Burret; Areca nigasolu Becc.; Areca rechingeriana Becc.; Areca rostrata Burret; Areca torulo Becc.; Areca warburgiana Becc.

Species of palm

Areca macrocalyx, the highland betel nut palm, is a palm in the family Arecaceae. It is native to New Guinea and surrounding islands.

== Description ==
Areca macrocalyx grows up to 25 m (80 ft) tall, with a single stem of diameter up to 25 cm (10 in). The leaves measure up to 2.5 m (8.2 ft) long. The inflorescence, erect or hanging down, is up to 65 cm (26 in) long and becomes club-like when fruiting. The obovoid fruit measures up to 5 cm (2 in) long.

== Distribution and habitat ==
Areca macrocalyx is native to New Guinea, the Maluku Islands, the Bismarck Archipelago and the Solomon Islands. Its habitat is in forests, to elevations of 1,500 m (5,000 ft).

== Conservation ==
Areca macrocalyx has been assessed as least concern on the IUCN Red List. It is widespread within its range and is present in numerous protected areas.

== Uses ==
Areca macrocalyx is locally used as building material. The palm heart is edible. The fruit is used in traditional medicine.
