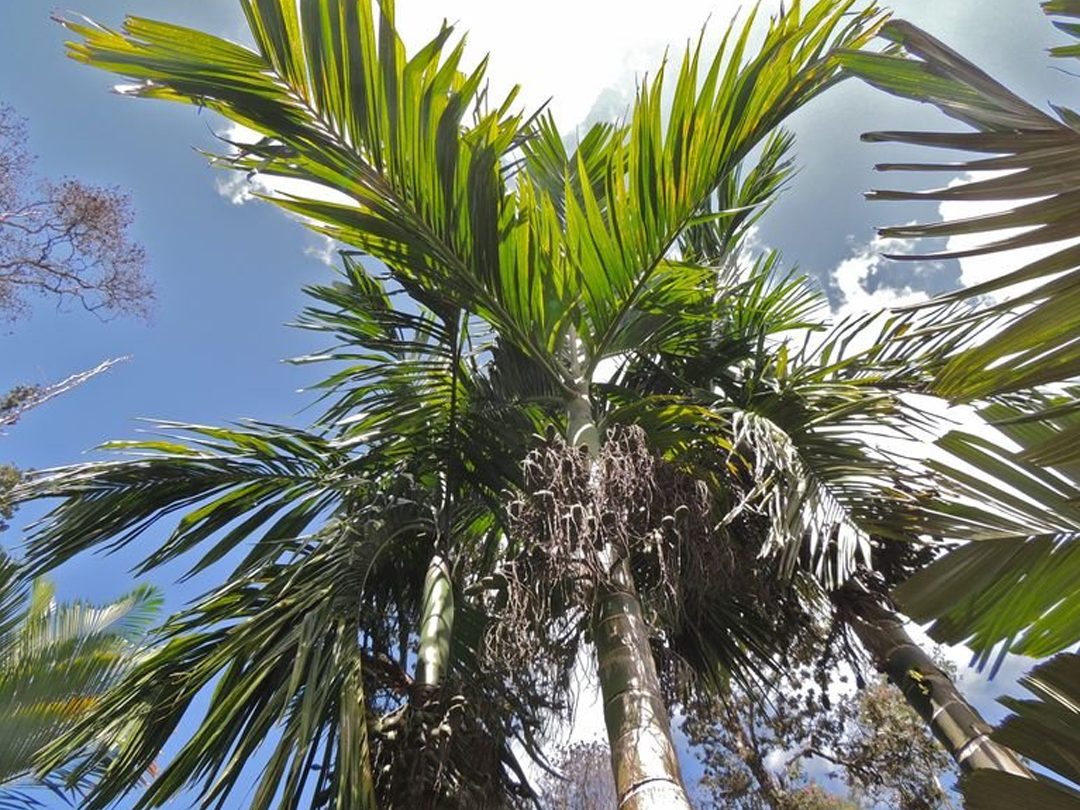

Conservation status
- Endangered (IUCN 3.1)

Scientific classification
- Kingdom: Plantae
- Clade: Tracheophytes
- Clade: Angiosperms
- Clade: Monocots
- Clade: Commelinids
- Order: Arecales
- Family: Arecaceae
- Genus: Areca
- Species: A. hutchinsoniana

Binomial name
- Areca hutchinsoniana Becc.

= Areca hutchinsoniana =

Species of palm

Areca hutchinsoniana is a species of flowering plant in the family Arecaceae. It is found only on the island of Mindanao in the Philippines.
