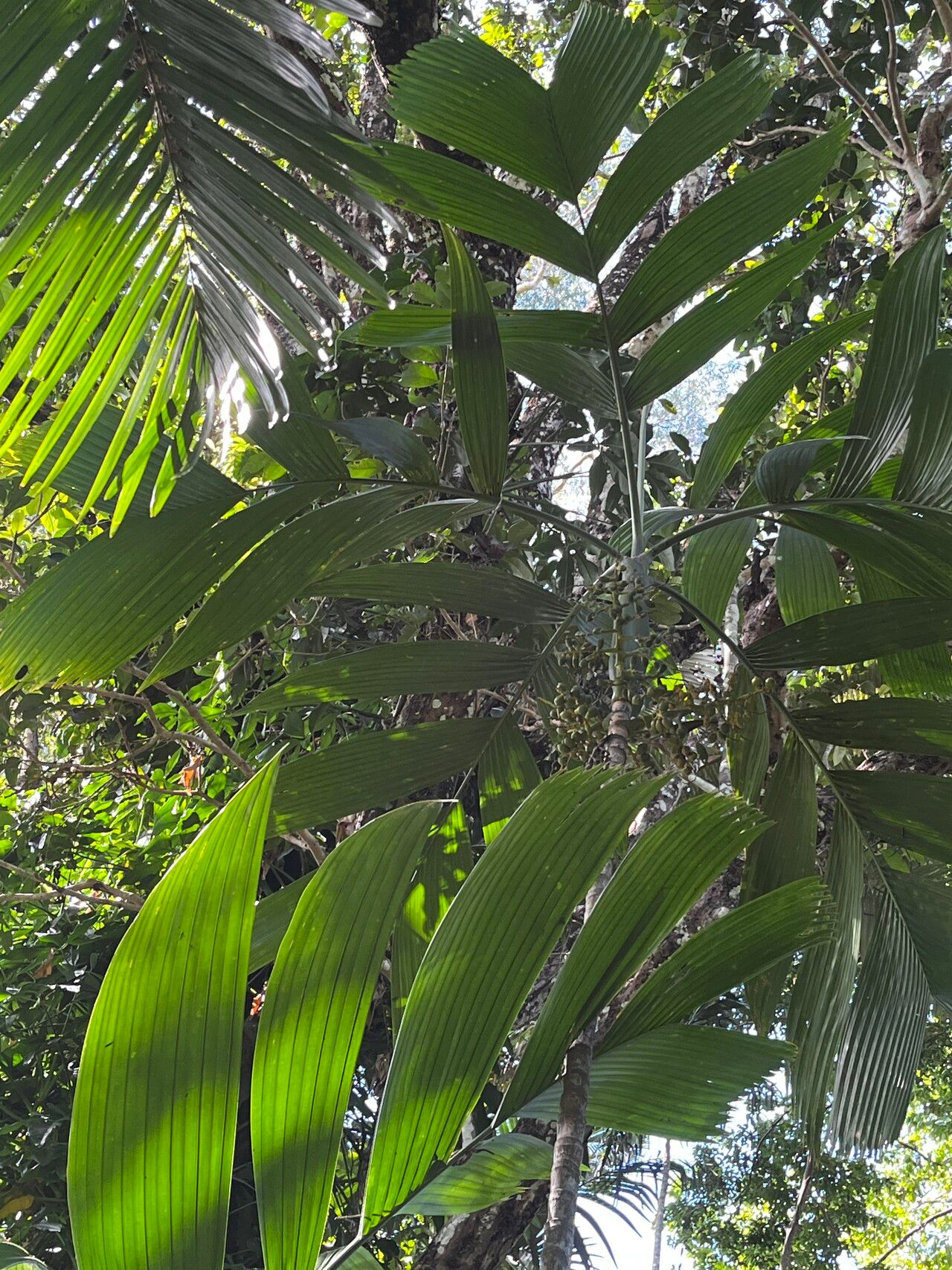
- Habit and leaves

Conservation status
- Near Threatened (IUCN 3.1)

Scientific classification
- Kingdom: Plantae
- Clade: Tracheophytes
- Clade: Angiosperms
- Clade: Monocots
- Clade: Commelinids
- Order: Arecales
- Family: Arecaceae
- Genus: Areca
- Species: A. novohibernica

Binomial name
- Areca novohibernica (Lauterb.) Becc.

Synonyms
- Areca guppyana Becc.

= Areca novohibernica =

Species of palm

Areca novohibernica is a species of palm native to the Solomon Islands and the Bismarck Archipelago in the Pacific Ocean east of New Guinea.

== Gallery ==
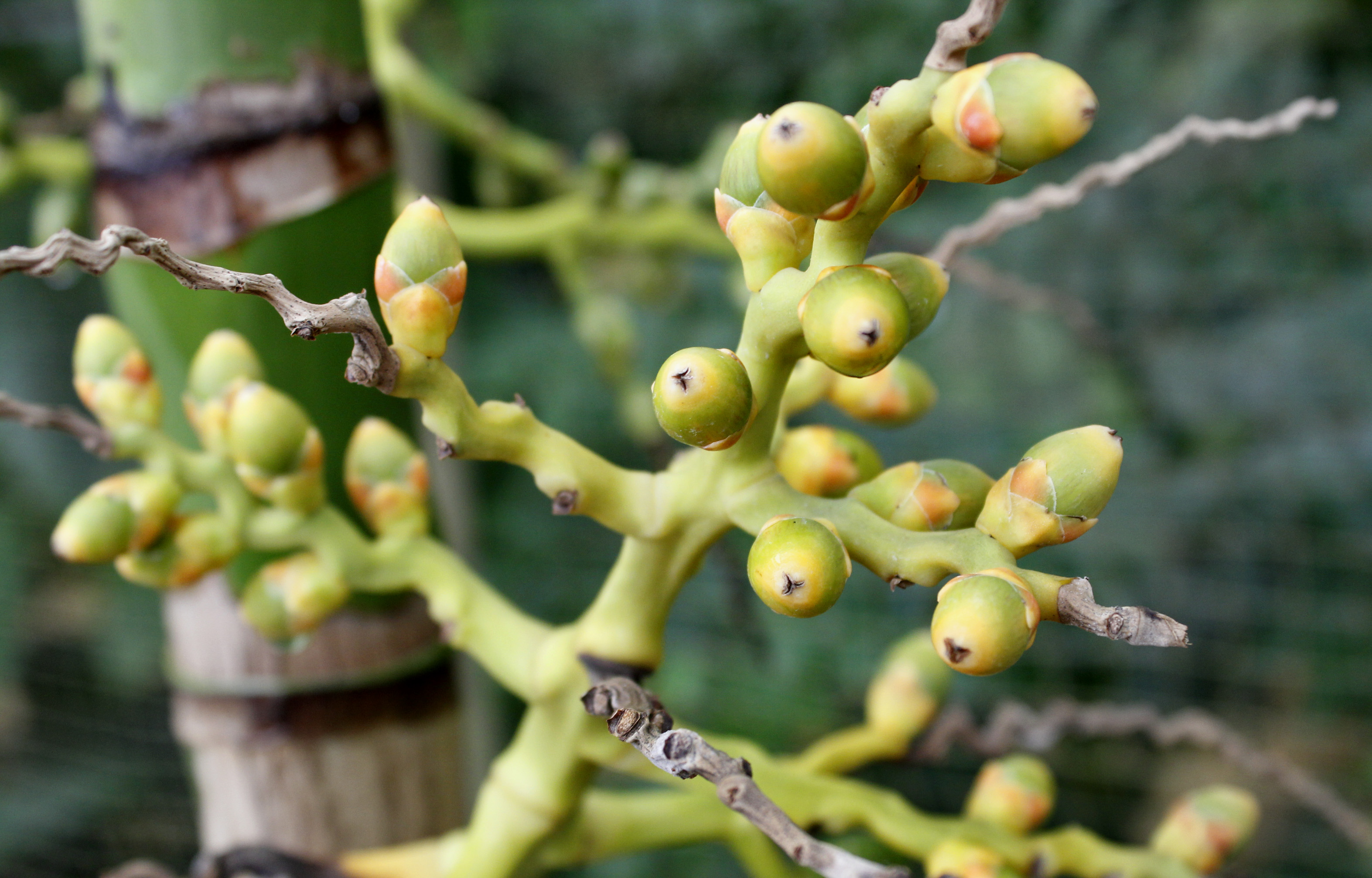
Fruits

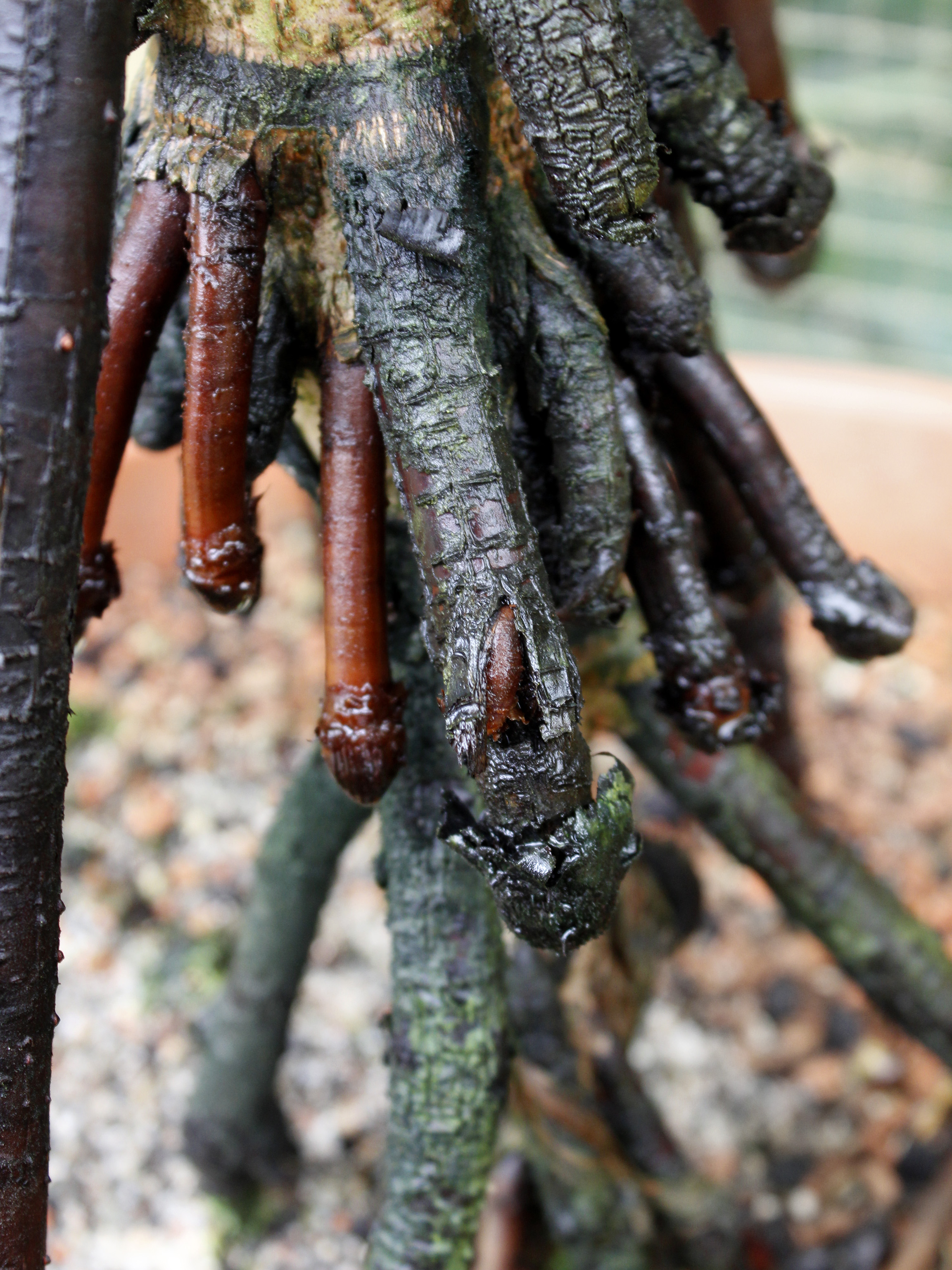
Adventitious roots

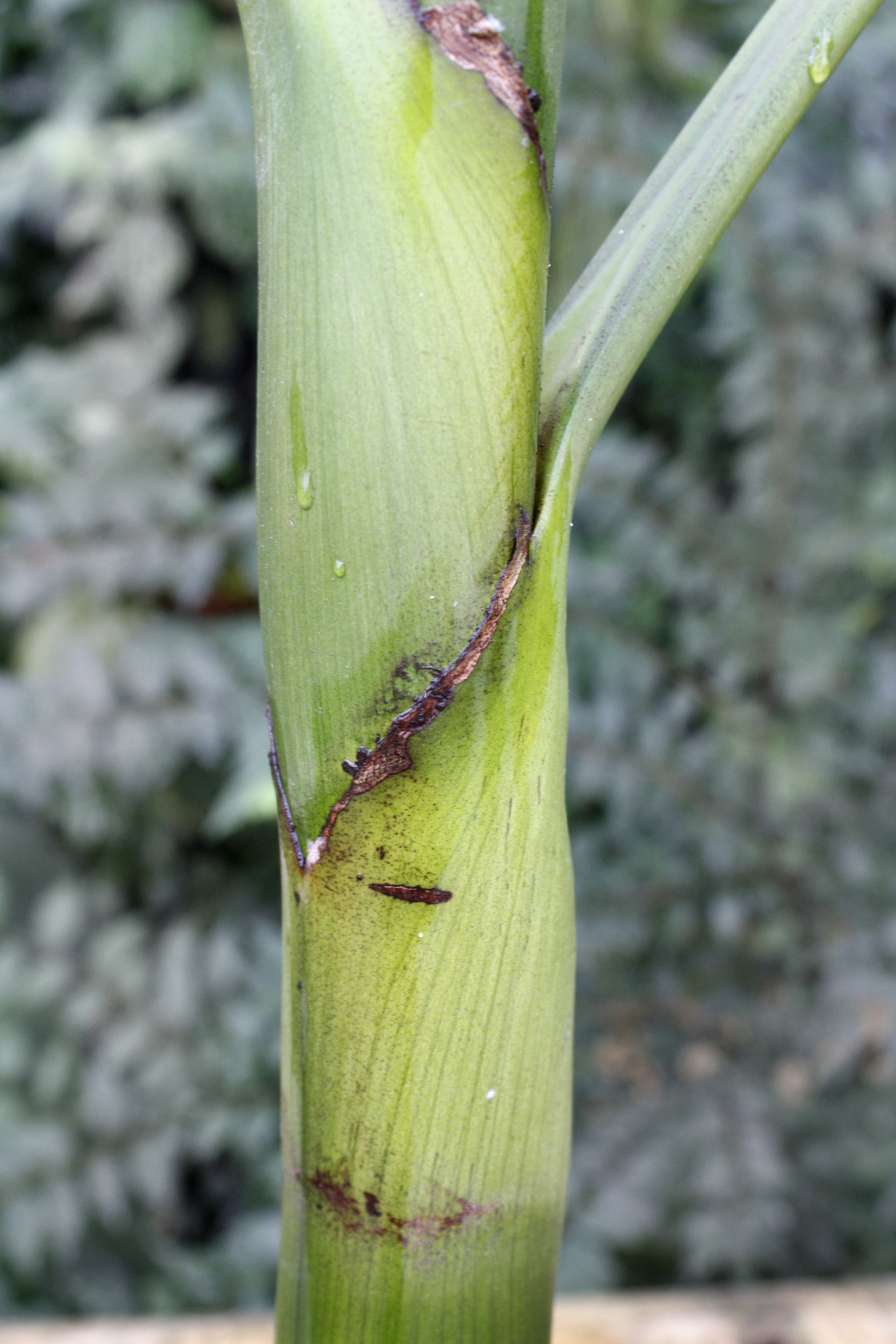
Stem
