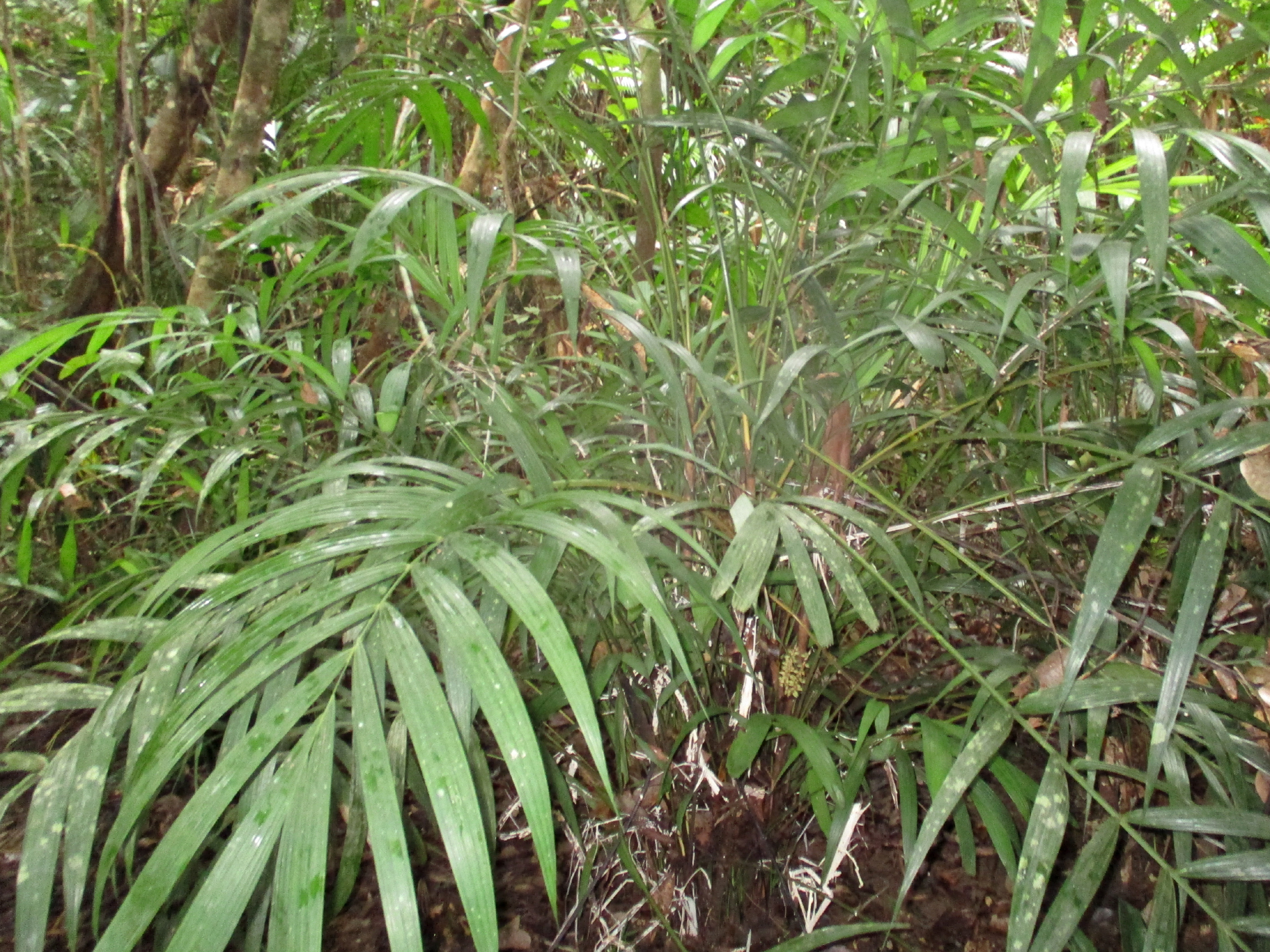
- Specimen photographed in Cat Tien National Park (Roy Bateman)

Scientific classification
- Kingdom: Plantae
- Clade: Tracheophytes
- Clade: Angiosperms
- Clade: Monocots
- Clade: Commelinids
- Order: Arecales
- Family: Arecaceae
- Genus: Pinanga
- Species: P. cattienensis

Binomial name
- Pinanga cattienensis Andr.Hend., N.K.Ban & N.Q.Dung

= Pinanga cattienensis =

Species of palm

Pinanga cattienensis is a species of small palm in the family Arecaceae. It is endemic to Vietnam, having been found in Cat Tien National Park in Đồng Nai Province, growing in seasonally-flooded tropical forest at low elevations.

== Description ==
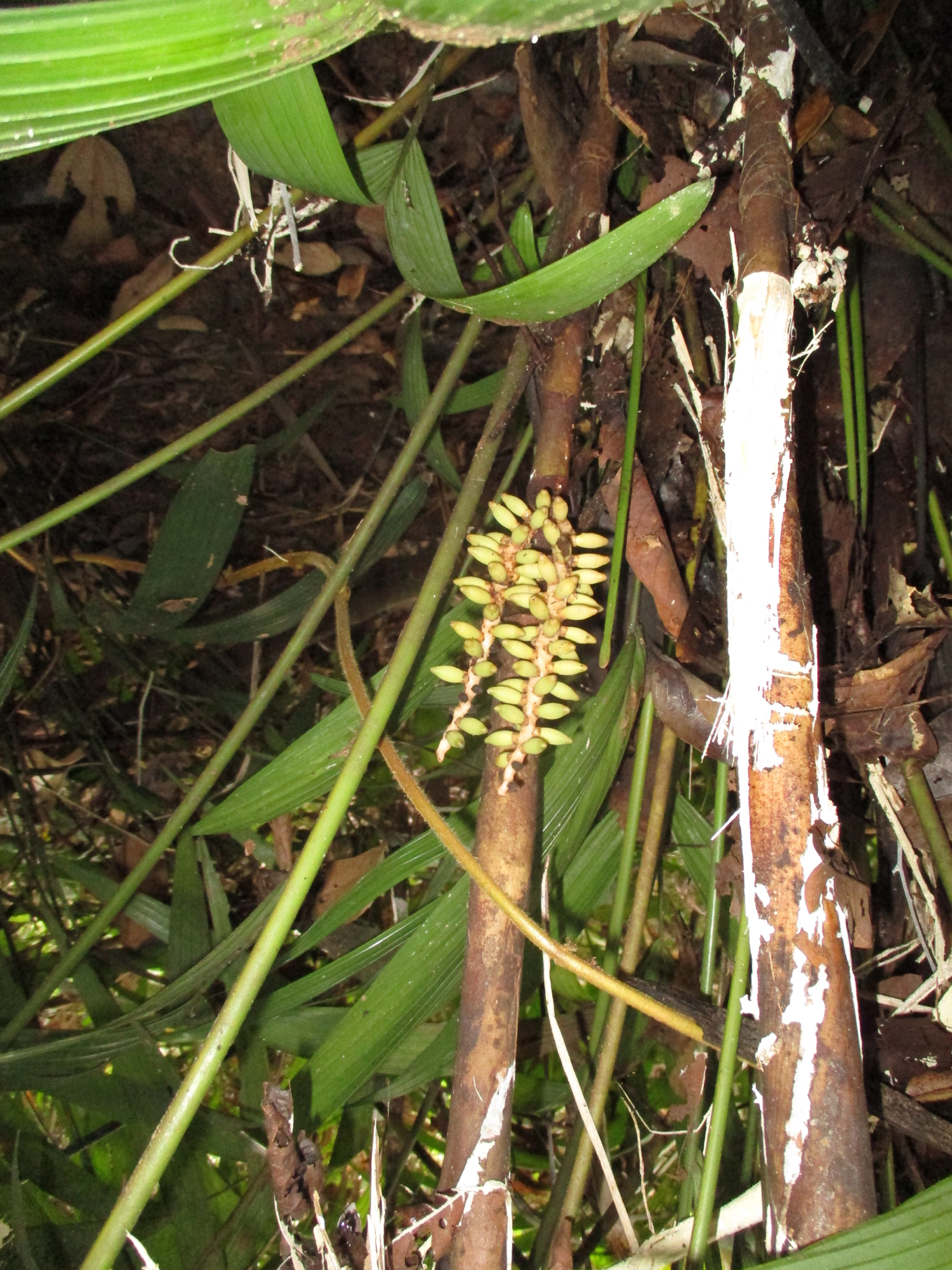
Young infructescence (as above)

Pinanga cattienensis differs from all previously described species of Pinanga from Vietnam, by its leaf sheaths which do not form expanded/extended bases of the leaves to form a crown ("crownshaft") and inflorescences which are not situated below the leaves. Instead, the inflorescences push through the persistent, disintegrating, subtending leaf sheaths: they are spreading, with peduncles 5 mm long, 9 mm wide; "prophylls" (the lowest tract of the inflorescence) are 90–140 mm long, persistent and erect, splitting abaxially. There is no rachis, but 3-4 "rachillae" are 90–130 mm long, rectangular in cross-section, glabrous.

Flower "triads" (two male and one female flowers in groups, common with palms) are spirally arranged. Staminate flowers are 6 mm long, with sepals forming a 3-lobed, flat, membranous calyx 1.5 mm long; three petals, 6 mm long, triangular, fleshy, acute; stamens 20–22. Pistillate flowers are 2.5 mm long: the calyx is 2.5 mm long with 3, free, imbricate, scarcely ciliate, non-acuminate sepals; the corolla similar to the calyx; ovary 2.5 mm long.

The inflorescences are similar to P. humilis, but P. cattienensis differs from the latter in its spirally (versus distichously) arranged triads, 900–950 mm long (versus 380–390 mm long) rachis and 9–13 (vs. 5–7) pinnae per side of the rachis.

Fruits are 18–20 mm long, 5–6 mm in diameter, ellipsoid, red-pink when mature; the endosperm has an uneven surface ("ruminate").

Stems are clustered, forming dense clumps of short stems to 0.5 m tall (sometimes to 1.5 m tall) 20 mm in diameter and green but covered with reddish-brown scales. Sheaths open, not forming "crownshafts", 270–280 mm long, green with reddish-brown scales; "ocreas" (extensions of the leaf sheath) are present. Petioles are 0.87-1.16 m long and green; the rachis is 900–950 mm long, with 9-13 pinnae each side of rachis, which are linear and contracted at the bases. The middle pinna is 420 mm long and 25–30 mm wide at the middle; apical pinna 165 mm long and 50 mm wide at the middle, lobed; veins scarcely prominent adaxially.
