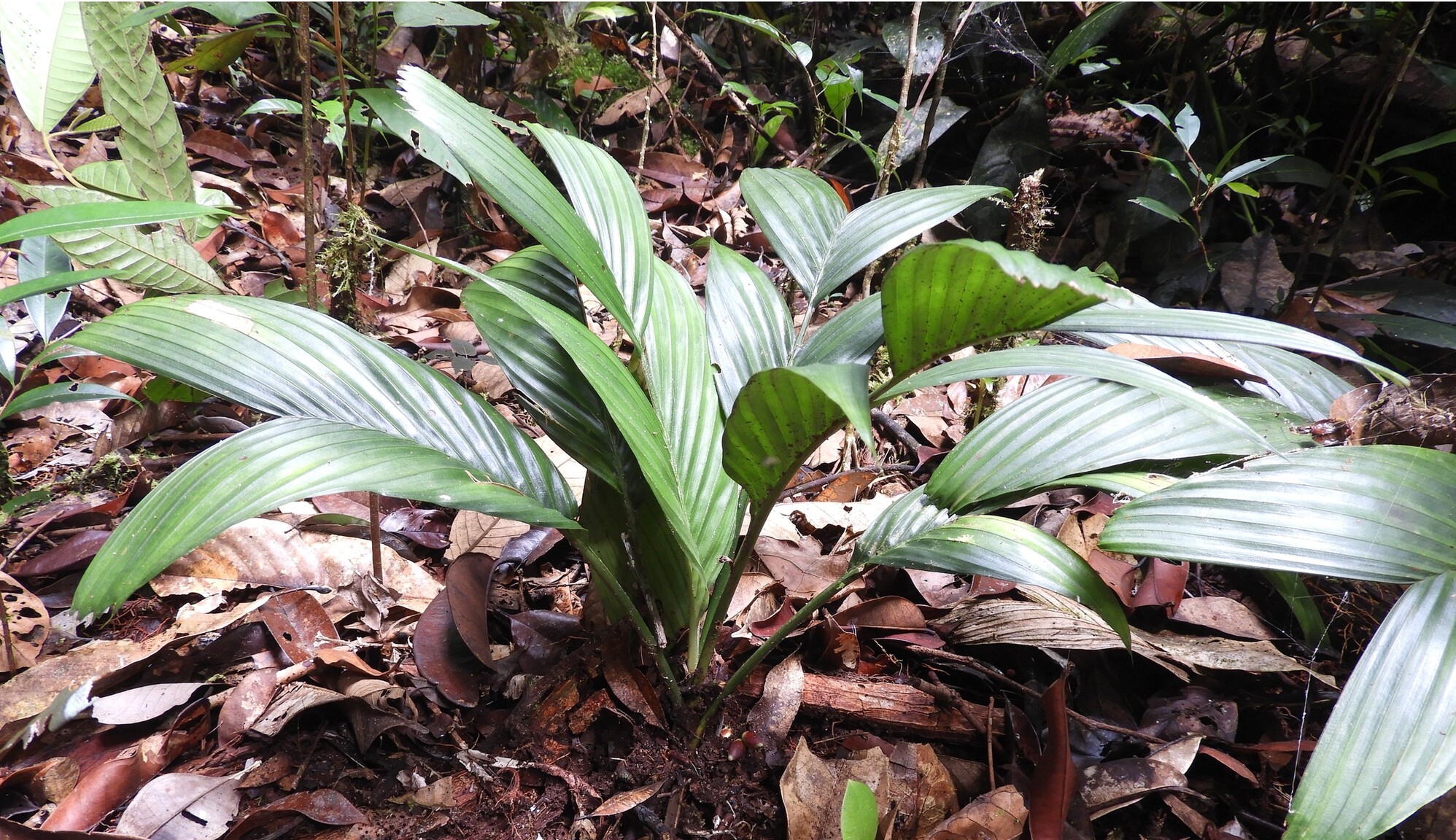

Scientific classification
- Kingdom: Plantae
- Clade: Embryophytes
- Clade: Tracheophytes
- Clade: Angiosperms
- Clade: Monocots
- Clade: Commelinids
- Order: Arecales
- Family: Arecaceae
- Genus: Pinanga
- Species: P. subterranea

Binomial name
- Pinanga subterranea Randi & W.J.Baker
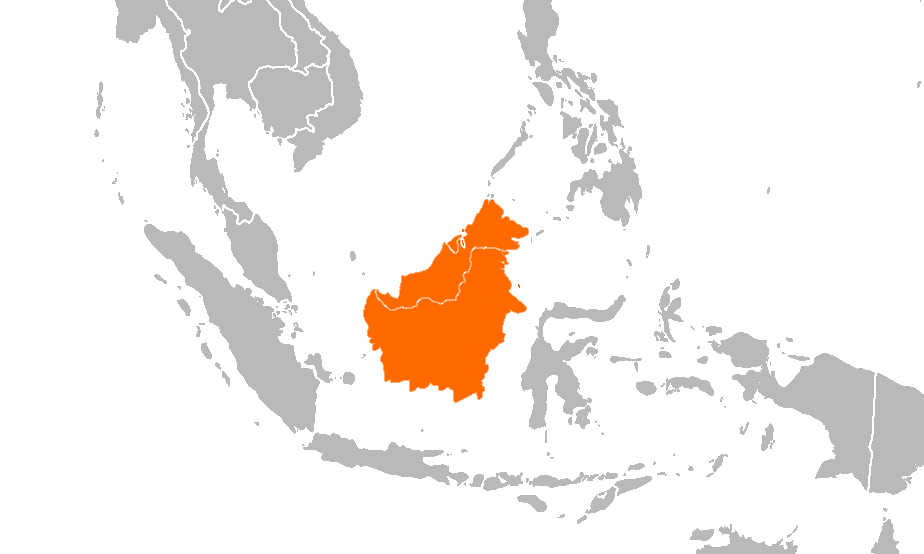
- P. subterranea distribution

= Pinanga subterranea =

Species of palm

Pinanga subterranea is a species of tree in the Arecaceae, or palm tree, family native to Borneo. It is widespread in the west of the island, where local communities use it for food.

== Botany ==
The species is found in lowland forest valleys 650 metres above sea level and on slopes near streams. It grows well in chalky, red, or sandy clay soils.

== Ecology ==
=== Pollination ===
P. subterranea has a highly unusual reproductive strategy. Its subterranean flowers are pollinated beneath the surface. The seeds are dispersed by wild boars, which dig into the ground to reach the fruit. Plants that can flower and bear fruit underground at the same time are rare, with only P. subterranea and orchid genus Rhizanthella can do both of these .
