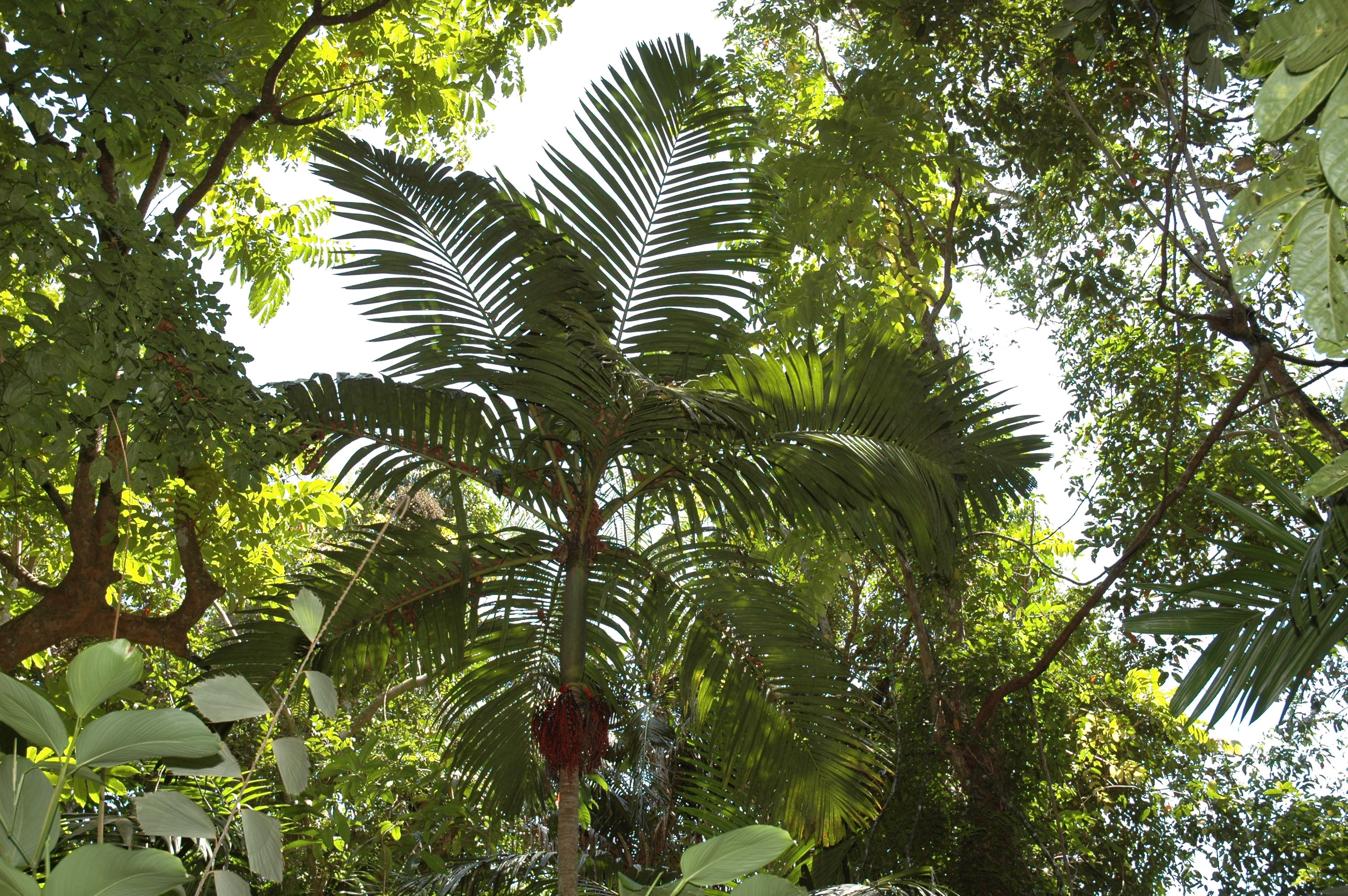
- Pinanga andamanensis at Mount Harriet National Park, Andaman Islands

Scientific classification
- Kingdom: Plantae
- Clade: Tracheophytes
- Clade: Angiosperms
- Clade: Monocots
- Clade: Commelinids
- Order: Arecales
- Family: Arecaceae
- Genus: Pinanga
- Species: P. andamanensis

Binomial name
- Pinanga andamanensis Becc.

= Pinanga andamanensis =

Species of palm

Pinanga andamanensis is one of the critically endangered species of endemic palms reported from the Andaman Islands.

This insular species was first described by Odoardo Beccari in 1934, based on an old herbarium collection procured by E. H. Man during the latter part of the 19th century. After the type collection by E. H. Man this species had not been reported and was thought to be extinct from these group of Islands until 1992. While working on the flora of Mount Harriet National Park hill ranges, Pinanga andamanensis was rediscovered by Mathew & Malick of the Botanical Survey of India after a gap over 100 years. Live collections are introduced at Tropical Botanic Garden and Research Institute, Trivandrum, South India.
