= Areca gurita =

Scientific classification
- Kingdom: Plantae
- Clade: Tracheophytes
- Clade: Angiosperms
- Clade: Monocots
- Clade: Commelinids
- Order: Arecales
- Family: Arecaceae
- Genus: Areca
- Species: A. gurita

Binomial name
- Areca gurita Heatubun, 2011

Species of palm

Areca gurita is an extant species of single-stemmed palm tree (genus Areca) indigenous to the Malaysian state of Sarawak on Borneo. Following Heatubun's identification of A. gurita in 2011, he recorded specimens in the vicinity of Kota Padawan, Kampong Patak, and Kampung Siburan, south of Kuching.

== Bibliography ==
- "Specimen: K000707045". Herbarium Catalogue. Royal Botanic Gardens, Kew. 2008-03-31.
- "Areca gurita Heatubun, Phytotaxa 28: 15 (2011)". Palmweb: Palms of the World Online. 2012.
- "Arecaceae Areca gurita Heatubun". International Plant Names Index. 2012.
