= Areca unipa =

Conservation status
- Critically Endangered (IUCN 3.1)

Scientific classification
- Kingdom: Plantae
- Clade: Tracheophytes
- Clade: Angiosperms
- Clade: Monocots
- Clade: Commelinids
- Order: Arecales
- Family: Arecaceae
- Genus: Areca
- Species: A. unipa

Binomial name
- Areca unipa Heatubun

Species of palm

Areca unipa is a palm in the family Arecaceae. It is native to New Guinea.

== Description ==
Areca unipa grows up to 12 m (40 ft) tall, with a single stem of diameter up to 7.5 cm (3 in). The leaves are dull or pale green and measure up to 1.2 m (4 ft) long, with a relatively long petiole at 16.5 cm (6 in). The inflorescence is up to 40 cm (16 in) long. The ovoid or obovoid fruit is beaked and measures up to 6 cm (2.4 in) long when unripe.

== Taxonomy ==
Areca unipa was described by Indonesian botanist Charlie Danny Heatubun in Phytotaxa in 2013. The type specimen was collected in East Aifat district of Maybrat Regency in Southwest Papua province. It is named after the University of Papua (UNIPA).

== Distribution and habitat ==
Areca unipa is endemic to New Guinea, where it is confined to the Bird's Head Peninsula. Its habitat is on coal beds in peat forests, at elevations of 200 m (700 ft).

== Conservation ==
Areca unipa has been assessed as critically endangered on the IUCN Red List. It has a single subpopulation of as few as 100 trees. The species is locally used as a betel nut substitute, for which the tree is felled. Coal mining and logging concessions have been granted in the area which, if activated, would place the species at risk of extinction.
