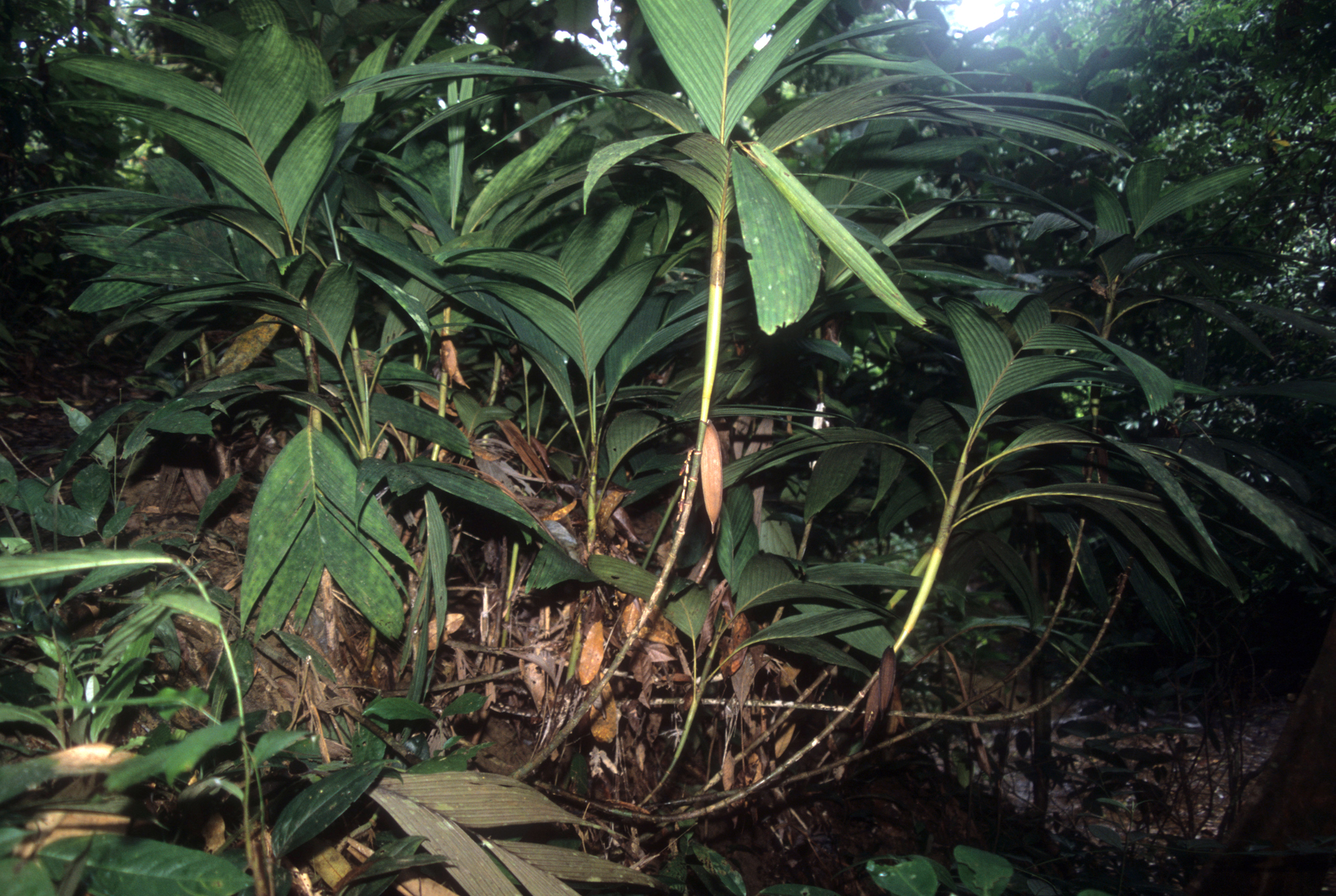
- Pinanga cleistantha in Malaysia

Scientific classification
- Kingdom: Plantae
- Clade: Tracheophytes
- Clade: Angiosperms
- Clade: Monocots
- Clade: Commelinids
- Order: Arecales
- Family: Arecaceae
- Subfamily: Arecoideae
- Tribe: Areceae
- Subtribe: Arecinae
- Genus: Pinanga; Blume, 1838

Synonyms
- Cladosperma Griff.; Ophiria Becc.; Pseudopinanga Burret

= Pinanga =

Genus of palms

Pinanga is a genus of flowering plant of the palm family in the subtribe Arecinae. It is native to eastern and southern Asia (India, China, Indo-China, Malesia) across to New Guinea.

== Species ==
Accepted species:

- Pinanga acaulis Ridl.
- Pinanga acuminata A.J.Hend.
- Pinanga adangensis Ridl.
- Pinanga albescens Becc.
- Pinanga andamanensis Becc.
- Pinanga angustisecta Becc.
- Pinanga annamensis Magalon
- Pinanga arinasae Witono
- Pinanga aristata (Burret) J.Dransf.
- Pinanga arundinacea Ridl.
- Pinanga auriculata Becc.
- Pinanga badia Hodel
- Pinanga basilanensis Becc.
- Pinanga batanensis Becc.
- Pinanga baviensis Becc.
- Pinanga bicolana Fernando
- Pinanga borneensis Scheff.
- Pinanga brevipes Becc.
- Pinanga caesia Blume
- Pinanga capitata Becc.
- Pinanga cattienensis Andr.Hend., N.K.Ban & N.Q.Dung
- Pinanga celebica Scheff.
- Pinanga chaiana J.Dransf.
- Pinanga cleistantha J.Dransf.
- Pinanga copelandii Becc.
- Pinanga coronata Blume
- Pinanga crassipes Becc.
- Pinanga cucullata J.Dransf.
- Pinanga cupularis A.J.Hend., N.K.Ban & N.Q.Dung
- Pinanga curranii Becc.
- Pinanga declinata A.J.Hend., N.K.Ban & N.Q.Dung
- Pinanga decora L.Linden & Rodigas
- Pinanga densiflora Becc.
- Pinanga dicksonii Blume
- Pinanga disticha Blume
- Pinanga dumetosa J.Dransf.
- Pinanga egregia Fernando
- Pinanga forbesii Ridl.
- Pinanga fractiflexa Hodel
- Pinanga furfuracea Blume
- Pinanga geonomiformis Becc.
- Pinanga glauca Ridl.
- Pinanga glaucifolia Fernando
- Pinanga globulifera Merr.
- Pinanga globulifera Blume
- Pinanga gracilis Blume
- Pinanga gracillima Merr.
- Pinanga grandijuga Burret
- Pinanga grandis Burret
- Pinanga griffithii Becc.
- Pinanga heterophylla Becc.
- Pinanga hexasticha Kurz
- Pinanga hookeriana Becc.
- Pinanga humilis A.J.Hend., N.K.Ban & N.Q.Dung
- Pinanga hymenospatha Hook.f.
- Pinanga inaequalis Blume
- Pinanga insignis Becc.
- Pinanga isabelensis Becc.
- Pinanga jamariensis C.K.Lim
- Pinanga jambusana C.K.Lim
- Pinanga javana Blume
- Pinanga johorensis C.K.Lim & Saw
- Pinanga keahi Furtado
- Pinanga kontumensis A.J.Hend., N.K.Ban & N.Q.Dung
- Pinanga lacei A.J.Hend.
- Pinanga latisecta Blume
- Pinanga lepidota Rendle
- Pinanga ligulata Becc.
- Pinanga limbangensis C.K.Lim
- Pinanga limosa Ridl.
- Pinanga macrospadix Burret
- Pinanga maculata Porte ex Lem.
- Pinanga malaiana Scheff.
- Pinanga manii Becc.
- Pinanga megalocarpa Burret
- Pinanga micholitzii Hort.
- Pinanga minor Blume
- Pinanga minuta Furtado
- Pinanga mirabilis Becc.
- Pinanga modesta Becc.
- Pinanga mooreana J.Dransf.
- Pinanga negrosensis Becc.
- Pinanga nuichuensis A.J.Hend., N.K.Ban & B.V.Thanh
- Pinanga pachycarpa Burret
- Pinanga pachyphylla J.Dransf.
- Pinanga palustris Kiew
- Pinanga pantiensis J.Dransf.
- Pinanga paradoxa (Griff.) Scheff.
- Pinanga parvula Ridl.
- Pinanga patula Blume
- Pinanga pectinata Becc.
- Pinanga perakensis Becc.
- Pinanga philippinensis Becc.
- Pinanga pilosa (Burret) J.Dransf.
- Pinanga piscatorum Pierre ex Gagnep.
- Pinanga plicata A.J.Hend.
- Pinanga polymorpha Becc.
- Pinanga porrecta Burret
- Pinanga pulchella Burret
- Pinanga purpurea Hendra
- Pinanga quadrijuga Gagnep.
- Pinanga ridleyana Becc. ex Furtado
- Pinanga rigida Becc.
- Pinanga riparia Ridl.
- Pinanga rivularis Becc.
- Pinanga rumphiana (Mart.) J.Dransf. & Govaerts
- Pinanga rupestris J.Dransf.
- Pinanga salicifolia Blume
- Pinanga samarana Becc.
- Pinanga sarmentosa Saw
- Pinanga sclerophylla Becc.
- Pinanga scortechinii Becc.
- Pinanga sessilifolia Furtado
- Pinanga sibuyanensis Becc.
- Pinanga sierramadreana Fernando
- Pinanga simplicifrons (Miq.) Becc.
- Pinanga singaporensis Ridl.
- Pinanga sobolifera Fernando
- Pinanga speciosa Becc.
- Pinanga spectabilis Bull
- Pinanga stricta Becc.
- Pinanga stylosa Becc.
- Pinanga subintegra Ridl.
- Pinanga subruminata Becc.
- Pinanga subterranea
- Pinanga sylvestris (Lour.) Hodel
- Pinanga tashiroi Hayata
- Pinanga tenacinervis J.Dransf.
- Pinanga tenella Scheff.
- Pinanga tomentella Becc.
- Pinanga tomentosa A.J.Hend.
- Pinanga trichoneura Becc.
- Pinanga uncinata Burret
- Pinanga urdanetana Becc. ex Martelli
- Pinanga urdanetensis Becc.
- Pinanga urosperma Becc.
- Pinanga variegata Becc.
- Pinanga veitchii H.Wendl.
- Pinanga versicolor A.J.Hend.
- Pinanga watanaiana C.K.Lim
- Pinanga woodiana Becc.
- Pinanga yassinii J.Dransf.

== Ecology ==
=== Pollination ecology ===
The species Pinanga subterranea has a highly unusual reproductive strategy. Its subterranean flowers are pollinated beneath the surface. The seeds are dispersed by wild boars, which dig into the ground to reach the fruit.
