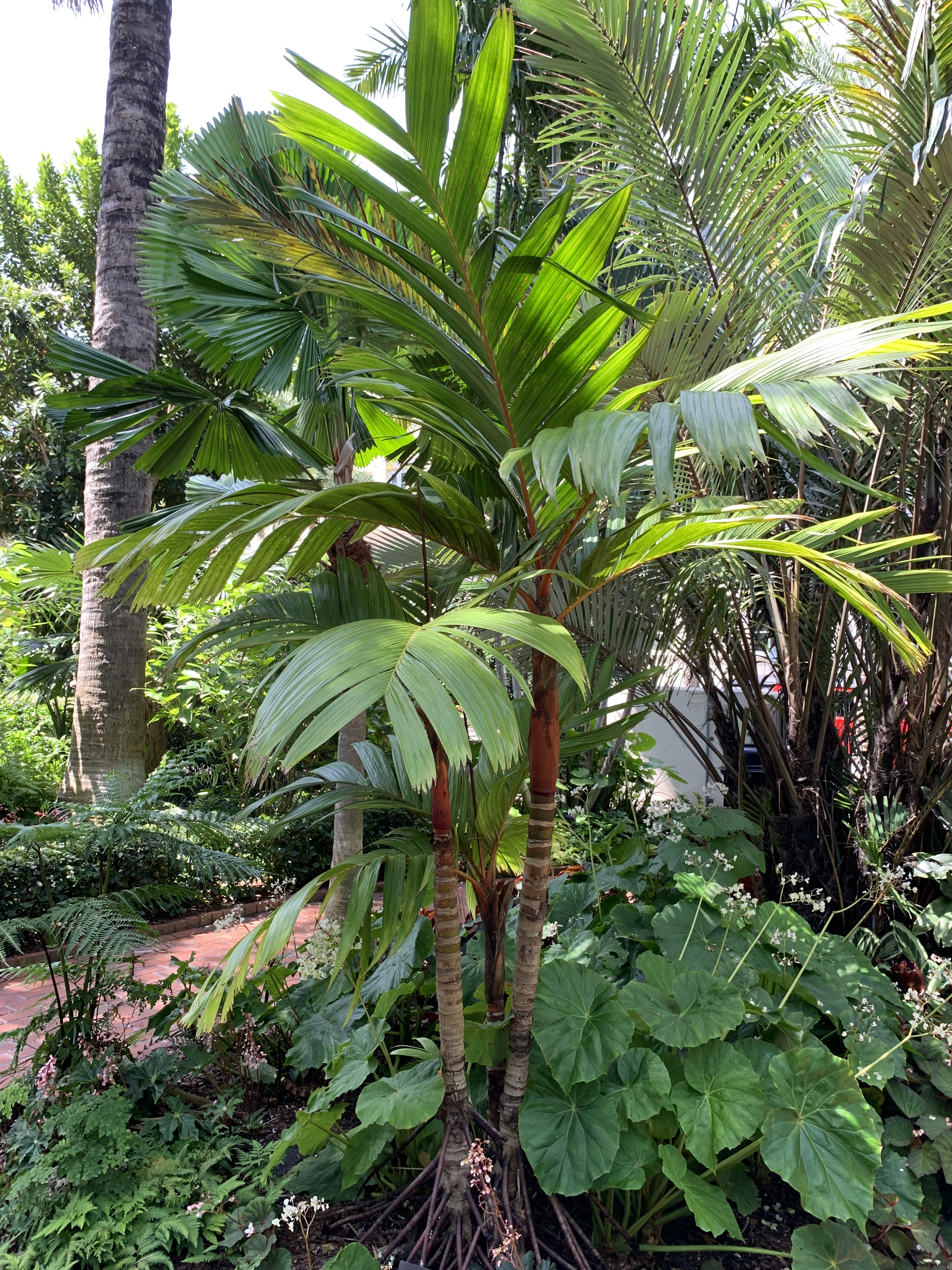

Scientific classification
- Kingdom: Plantae
- Clade: Tracheophytes
- Clade: Angiosperms
- Clade: Monocots
- Clade: Commelinids
- Order: Arecales
- Family: Arecaceae
- Genus: Areca
- Species: A. vestiaria

Binomial name
- Areca vestiaria Giseke

= Areca vestiaria =

Pinang yaki

Species of palm

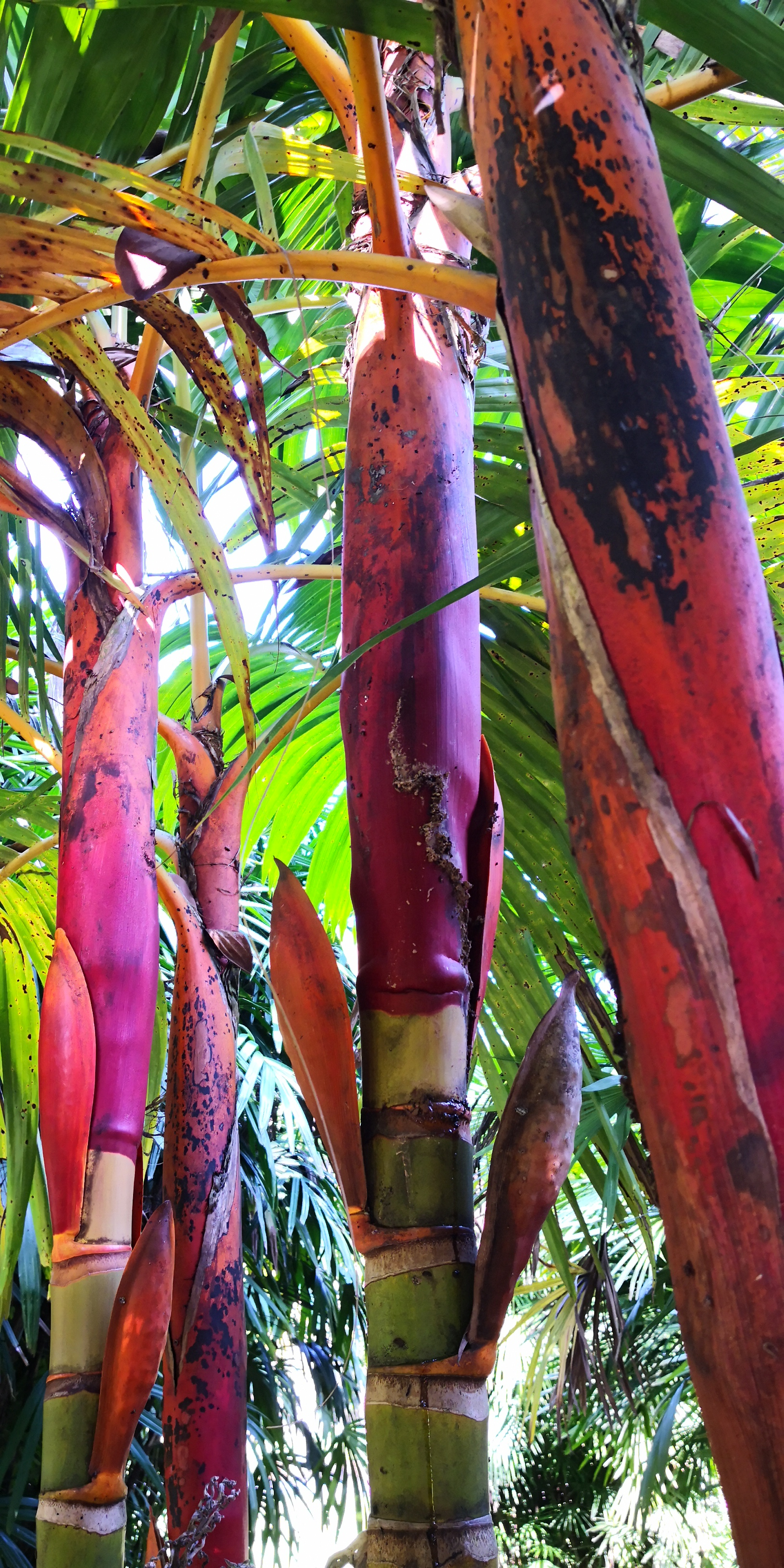
Areca vestiaria - Trunks. January 2020. Location CAS Xishuangbanna Tropical Plant Garden, Mengla, Yunnan, SW China.

Areca vestiaria (pinang yaki or pinang merah) is a species of palm native to the rainforests of eastern Indonesia especially North Sulawesi. Its morphology is more diverse than other species of palms, and in particular the color of its upper trunk / crownshaft changes depending on altitude (varying between red and orange).

The people of Sulawesi, near Bogani Nani Wartabone National Park, have long used the fruit of this palm as a male contraceptive. They drink a decoction of the fruit flesh boiled in water. The chemical composition of the fruit has been investigated with this in mind, but this does not represent evidence of its effectiveness as an antifertility agent.

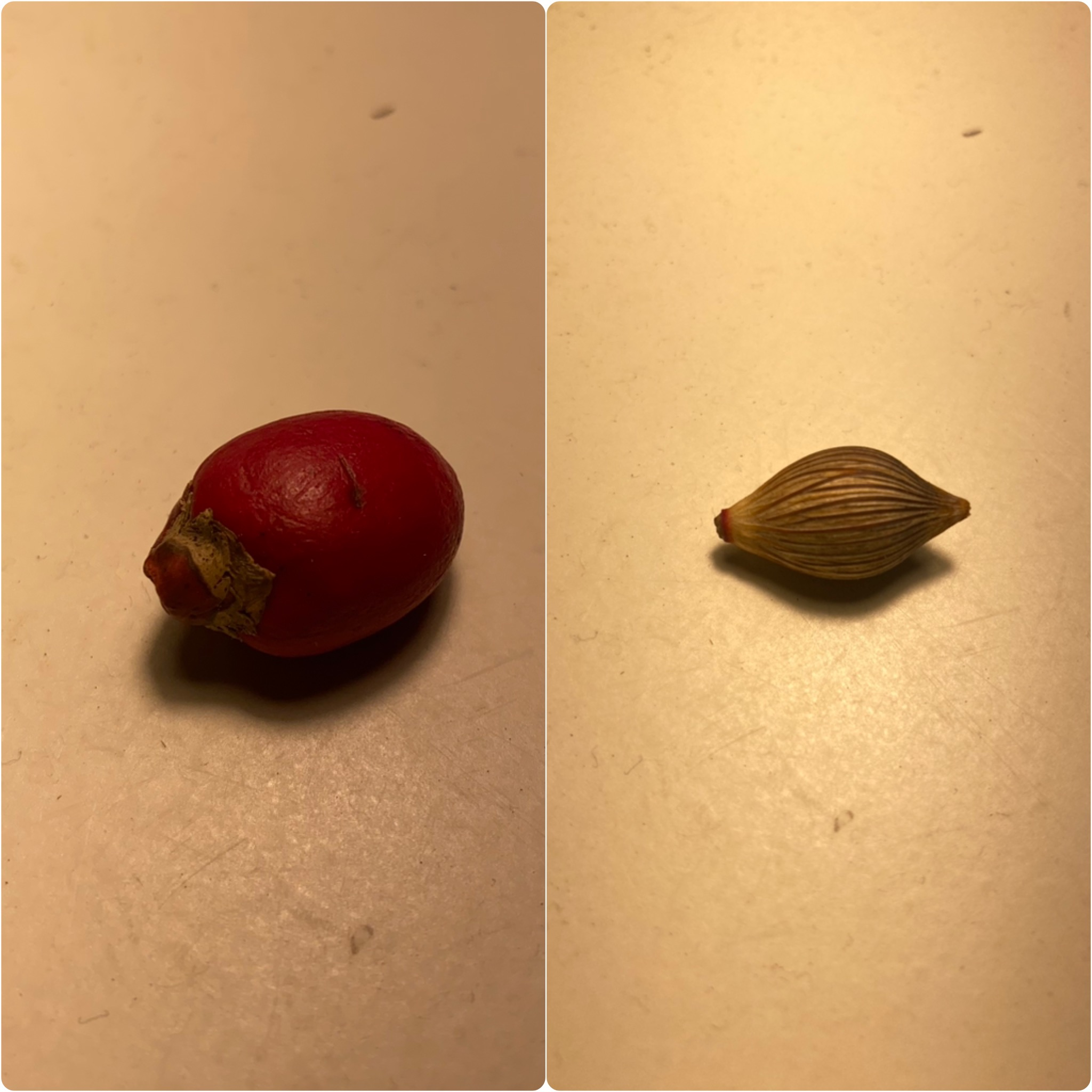
A. vestiaria fruit (left) and seed (right)
