= Areca mandacanii =

Conservation status
- Critically Endangered (IUCN 3.1)

Scientific classification
- Kingdom: Plantae
- Clade: Tracheophytes
- Clade: Angiosperms
- Clade: Monocots
- Clade: Commelinids
- Order: Arecales
- Family: Arecaceae
- Genus: Areca
- Species: A. mandacanii

Binomial name
- Areca mandacanii Heatubun

Species of palm

Areca mandacanii is a palm in the family Arecaceae. It is native to New Guinea.

== Description ==
Areca mandacanii grows up to 15 m (50 ft) tall, with a single stem of diameter up to 10 cm (4 in). The crown has eight leaves, each measuring up to 2.5 m (8.2 ft) long, with a petiole of 6 cm (2.4 in) length. The inflorescence is up to 60 cm (24 in) long, loosely branched. The ellipsoid fruit is dented and measures up to 7 cm (2.8 in) long.

== Taxonomy ==
Areca mandacanii was described by Indonesian botanist Charlie Danny Heatubun in Palms in 2008. The holotype was collected in the Maampou Forest of South Sorong Regency in Southwest Papua province. The species is named for Dominggus Mandacan, regent of Manokwari.

== Distribution and habitat ==
Areca mandacanii is endemic to western New Guinea, where it is confined to the Maampou Forest on the Bird's Head Peninsula. Its habitat is in areas prone to flooding, between lowland and swamp forests, at an elevation of 32 m (105 ft).

== Conservation ==
Areca mandacanii has been assessed as critically endangered on the IUCN Red List. The species is locally used as a betel nut substitute, for which the tree is felled. Coal mining and palm oil plantations are planned in the area, which would further threaten the species.
