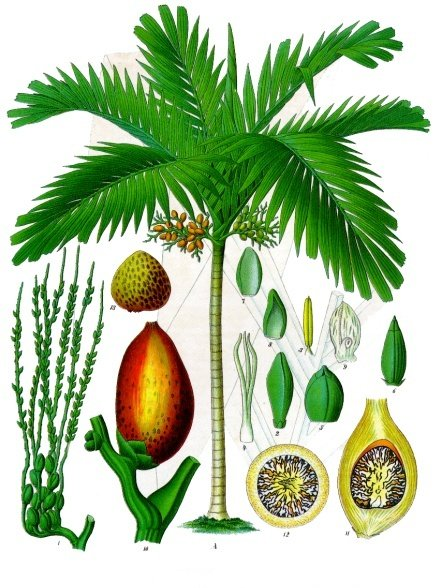
- Areca catechu – 1897 illustration

Scientific classification
- Kingdom: Plantae
- Clade: Tracheophytes
- Clade: Angiosperms
- Clade: Monocots
- Clade: Commelinids
- Order: Arecales
- Family: Arecaceae
- Subfamily: Arecoideae
- Tribe: Areceae
- Subtribe: Arecinae
- Genus: Areca; L.

Type species
- Areca catechu L.

Synonyms
- Mischophloeus Scheff.; Pichisermollia H.C.Monteiro

= Areca =

Genus of palms

Areca is a genus of palms in the family Arecaceae, found in humid tropical forests from the islands of the Philippines and Malaysia, India, and across Southeast Asia to Melanesia. The generic name Areca is derived from a name used locally on the Malabar Coast of India.

== Usage ==
The best-known member of the genus is Areca catechu, the areca nut palm. Several species of areca nuts, known for their bitter and tangy taste, raw or dried, are routinely used for chewing, especially in combination with the leaves of betel and dried leaves of tobacco. Areca nut is also popularly referred to as betel nut because of its use for chewing with betel leaves.

== Species ==
As of September 2026, Plants of the World Online accepted these species:

- Areca abdulrahmanii J.Dransf.
- Areca ahmadii J.Dransf.
- Areca andersonii J.Dransf.
- Areca arundinacea Becc.
- Areca bakeri Heatubun
- Areca brachypoda J.Dransf.
- Areca caliso Becc.
- Areca camarinensis Becc.
- Areca catechu L.
- Areca chaiana J.Dransf.
- Areca churchii Heatubun
- Areca concinna Thwaites
- Areca costulata Becc.
- Areca dayung J.Dransf.
- Areca dransfieldii Heatubun
- Areca furcata Becc.
- Areca gurita Heatubun
- Areca hutchinsoniana Becc.
- Areca insignis (Becc.) J.Dransf.
- Areca ipot Becc.
- Areca jokowi Heatubun
- Areca jugahpunya J.Dransf.
- Areca kinabaluensis Furtado
- Areca klingkangensis J.Dransf.
- Areca laosensis Becc.
- Areca macrocalyx Zipp. ex Blume
- Areca mandacanii Heatubun
- Areca minuta Scheff.
- Areca mogeana Heatubun
- Areca montana Ridl.
- Areca novohibernica (Lauterb.) Becc.
- Areca oxycarpa Miq.
- Areca parens Becc.
- Areca rheophytica J.Dransf.
- Areca ridleyana Becc. ex Furtado
- Areca riparia Heatubun
- Areca songthanhensis A.J.Hend., N.K.Ban & B.V.Thanh
- Areca subacaulis (Becc.) J.Dransf.
- Areca triandra Roxb. ex Buch.-Ham.
- Areca triginticollina Heatubun
- Areca tunku J.Dransf. & C.K.Lim
- Areca unipa Heatubun
- Areca vestiaria Giseke
- Areca vidaliana Becc.
- Areca whitfordii Becc.

== See also ==
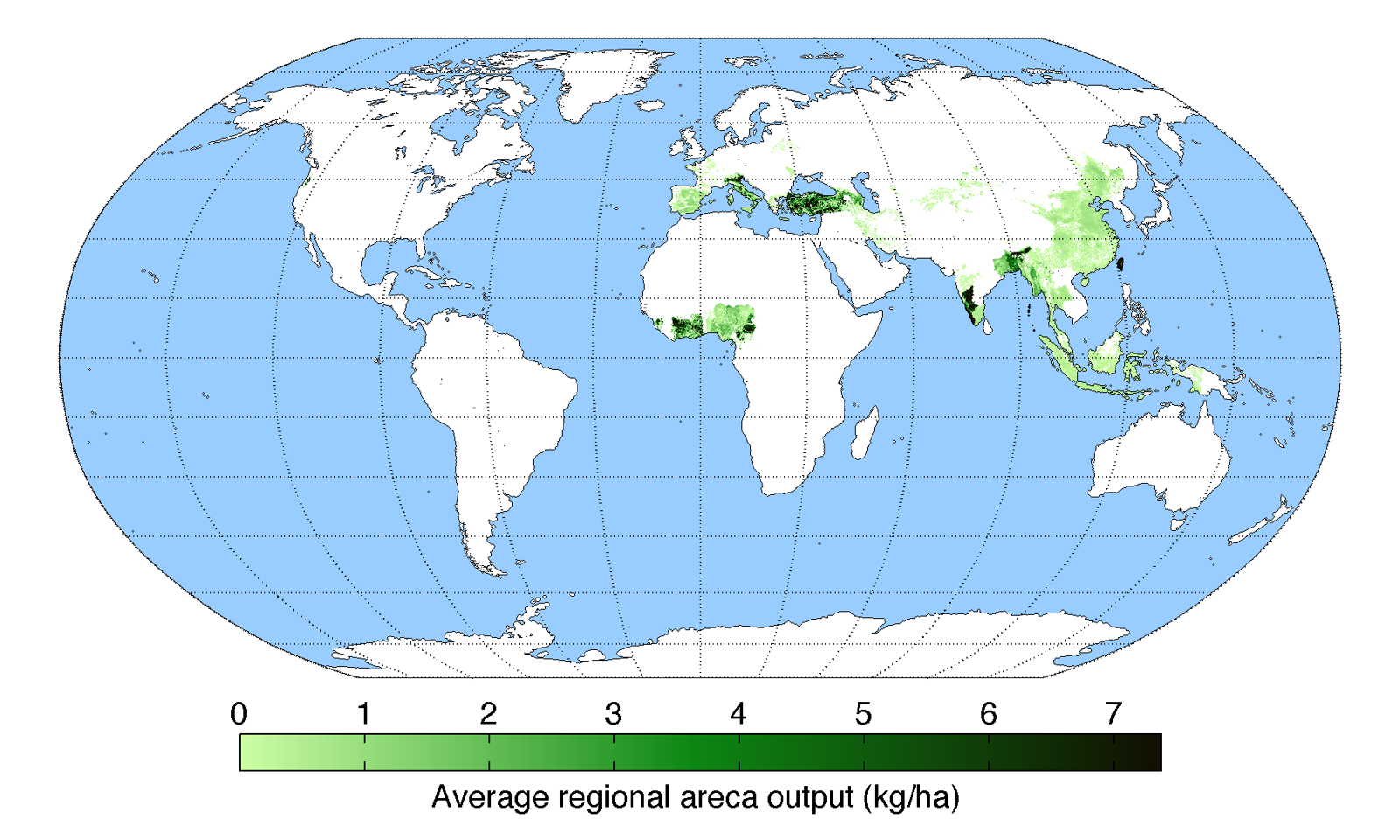
Worldwide areca yield

- Dypsis lutescens, a plant also sometimes referred to as "Areca palm"
