= Agriculture classification of crops =

Among the many systems of classification of crops, commercial, agricultural, and taxonomical can be considered to be the most widely accepted agriculture classification of crops.

== Commercial classification ==
Plants are sometimes classified as follows according to their commercial purposes.

Food crops include cereals, rice, wheat, maize, sorghum, ragi, pulses, legumes, fruits, vegetables, and nuts.

Industrial crops include cotton, sugarcane, tobacco, groundnut, castor, gingelly, tapioca, and more.

Food adjuncts are used for food and industrial use, with no distinct demarcation, and include spices, condiments, beverages, and narcotics.

It is also possible that one crop which has been included as a food crop may be figured as an industrial crop. Examples include maize and tapioca.

== Agricultural classification ==
The following list contains plant products for human use.

- Cereals
- Legumes
- Vegetables
- Fruits
- Nuts
- Oilseeds
- Sugars and starches
- Fibres
- Beverages
- Narcotics
- Spices
- Condiments
- Rubber
- Forage
- Green manure and green leaf manure

=== Cereals ===
Historically, wheat and barley were used as offerings, called Cerealia munera after Ceres, the Roman goddess of harvest. Subsequently, the grains used for food, and especially for making bread, were called Cerealia or cereals. The term is applicable to the grains obtained from the members of the family Poaceae, such as rice, wheat, maize, sorghum, barley, millet, rye, and oats.

Pseudocereals are plants such as buckwheat or amaranth, which are used similarly to cereals, but belong to families other than Poaceae.

=== Pulses ===
The term pulse is used for the seeds of plants from the Fabaceae family (legumes), such as beans, pea, lentil and chickpea. Pulses supply proteins and form chief source in vegetarian food. Leguminous plants fix nitrogen in root nodules, produced with the help of nitrogen fixing bacteria.

=== Oils and oilseeds ===
Plants wits high fat percentage are used to produce vegetable oils. Examples include oil palm, olive, soybean, rapeseed and sunflower.

=== Pastures ===
The grasses and legumes which are grown in arable land and left for animals to graze. The straw of paddy and cholam and dry plants of pulse crops and groundnut form important forages. The foliage of a number of trees and shrubs which are edible to animals form another source of forage especially in dry areas and during periods of scarcity.

=== Sugars and starches ===
Sugar is extracted from sugarcane and sugar beet. Starch can be extracted from maize, cassava and potatoes.

=== Rubbers ===
There are trees found in most parts of the world (but mostly Africa) that make or provide rubber for human uses.

=== Green manures and green-leaf manures ===
Growing of special crops for adding organic matter and nitrogen to the soil and by ploughing them in situ is called green manuring.

- Sunn hemp
- Pillipesara
- Kolingi
- Indigo
- Sesbania speciosa

== Taxonomical classification ==
Taxonomical classification includes the taxonomical aspects of crops which is their morphology and economical parts and agrobotanical characters. This classification increases understanding of the morphological characters of any particular family.

As a disadvantage, this classification of crops with different economic uses and morphological and other agrobotanical peculiarities when brought under one family does not generally highlight the economic importance of the individual crops.
