= Coffeeweed =

The name coffeeweed or coffee weed may refer to various plants used as coffee substitutes, including:

- Cichorium intybus (Family Asteraceae), also known as "common chicory", a plant species native to Europe
- Senna obtusifolia (Family Fabaceae), also known as "Chinese senna" or "sicklepod", a pantropical plant species
- Senna occidentalis (Family Fabaceae), also known as "coffee senna", a pantropical plant species
- Sesbania herbacea (Family Fabaceae), also known as "Colorado River hemp" or "bigpod sesbania", a plant species native to the United States
