= Sesbania rostrata =

Scientific classification
- Kingdom: Plantae
- Clade: Embryophytes
- Clade: Tracheophytes
- Clade: Angiosperms
- Clade: Eudicots
- Clade: Rosids
- Order: Fabales
- Family: Fabaceae
- Subfamily: Faboideae
- Clade: Robinioids
- Tribe: Sesbanieae
- Genus: Sesbania
- Species: S. rostrata

Binomial name
- Sesbania rostrata Bremek. & Oberm.

Synonyms
- Sesbania hirticalyx; Sesbania pachycarpa

Species of legume

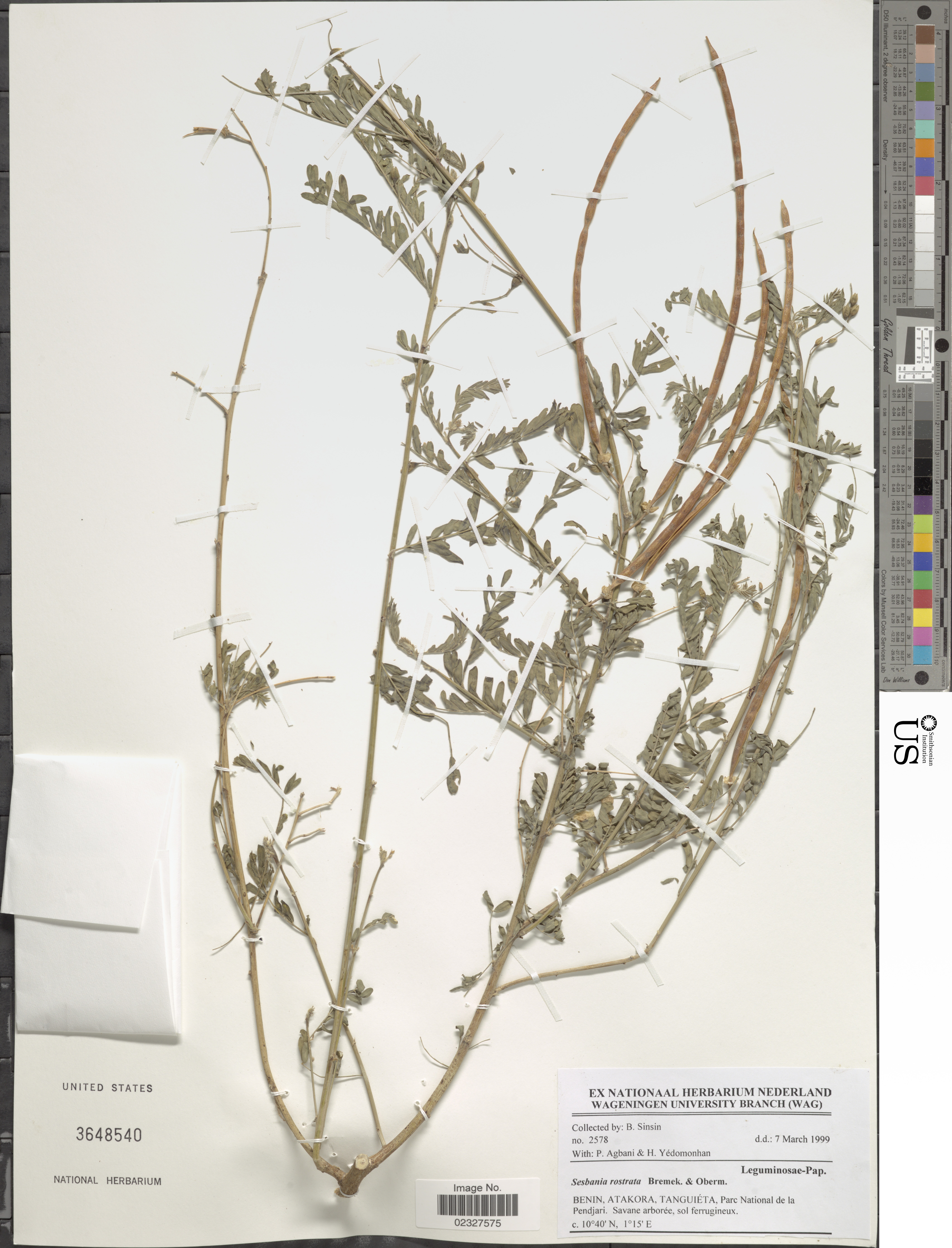
Specimen collected in the Pendjari National Park in Benin.

Sesbania rostrata is a small semi-aquatic leguminous tree, in the genus Sesbania. It forms a symbiotic relationship with Gram-negative rhizobia which leads to the formation of nitrogen fixing nodules on both stem and roots. It is mainly used as green manure to improve soil fertility due to its fast growth, high biomass production and ability to convert large amounts of atmospheric nitrogen into a usable form for plants. Other applications include production of high quality forage for livestock and it is a source of fuel-wood.

== Description ==
Sesbania rostrata is a woody, erect, robust, annual or short-lived perennial of about 1 to 3 m tall. The stem is covered with soft hairs and is 15 mm thick. Leaves are 7 to 25 cm long and paripinnate with 12 to 22 pairs of leaflets. Racemes contain 3 to 15 flowers on a rachis, and flowers are yellow. Pods are curved 15 to 22 cm long, and seeds are small, sub-cylindrical, and light to dark brown in colour.

Common names
India: jantar, manila agathi, new dhaincha

Nepal: girkhe dhaichaa Thailand: sano African

Sesbania rostrata is notable for its ability to perform "double nodulation": it forms both root nodules and stem nodules. The latter are actually nodules formed on adventitious roots derived from the stems. This ability is widespread among Aeschynomene and Sesbania.

== History and geography ==
S. rostrata is native to the Sahel region of Africa and grows naturally throughout the tropics in marshes, floodplains, and edges of pools. It has also been found in open savannah. It was first discovered in Senegal, and its use as a green manure in wet rice cultivation caused special interest at the International Rice Research Institute (IRRI), in the Philippines. S. rostrata was then introduced into Asia and it has been used as a green manure for lowland rice systems in several countries in the region.

== Growing conditions ==
S. rostrata can be propagated vegetatively (from stem-cuttings or ratooning) or from seed. It takes 50 to 60 days to grow. Plants propagated from cuttings grow 2 to 2.5 times faster than seeded plants in the first 42 days. S. rostrata grows naturally in waterlogged and alluvial soils. It tolerates freely drained, poorly drained, and flooded soils with moderate fertility, though it does not grow well in heavy clay soils. S. rostrata tolerates a pH down to 4.3 to slightly alkaline, but nitrogen-fixation is reduced in acidic conditions. It is adapted to low and moderate salinity but seed germination and growth decreases as salinity concentration increases. The ideal water requirement is 600–1000 mm rainfall. It is a tropical plant with an optimal temperature of 25 °C. The addition of lime in highly acidic soils and phosphorus in soils with low fertility improves growth and nitrogen fixation of S. rostrata. It fixes large amounts of nitrogen in only 6–8 weeks if the appropriate strain of Azorhizobium caulinodans is present in the soil. S. rostrata is a short-day plant with a day length of 12–12.5 hrs. During shorter day lengths it flowers earlier, however, when day lengths are longer than 12 hrs, then it flowers later. Its use as a green manure is limited to that part of the year with longer day lengths because during this period vegetative growth is extended and more biomass is produced.

== Other farming issues ==
=== Seeding vs. vegetative propagation ===
S. rostrata has seeds with a hard seed coat which prevents or delays germination. To break this dormancy it requires scarification, which can be done by different methods: physical abrasion of the seed coat, soaking the seeds in hot water or in concentrated sulphuric acid. Other disadvantages include the small size of the seeds, which makes handling challenging for farmers, the high seeding rates, and the need for proper irrigation and a fine even seedbed during the first week after seeding. Seeds are in short supply and vary in quality. A more practical alternative to seeding is vegetative propagation by ratooning and stem-cutting. Both ratooning and stem-cuttings yield more biomass, accumulate more nitrogen, and grow faster than seeded plants.

=== Companion species ===
S. rostrata is used as an intercrop with grasses such as rice (Oryza sativa) and maize (Zea mays), as well as with legumes such as rice bean (Vigna umbellata) and jointvetch (Aeschynomene afraspera). If intercropped with rice, it should be planted 30 days after the rice to prevent competition between the crops.

== Stress tolerance ==
S. rostrata grows in altitudes up to 1500–1600 m, and is able to endure waterlogged soils and flooding over 1 m deep. It tolerates bimodal and summer rainfall patterns, heavy to medium clay soils, neutral pH, free and impeded soil drainage.

== Major weeds, pests and diseases ==
=== Diseases ===
The most common diseases affecting S. rostrata are damping-off caused by Pythium spp. and Rhizoctonia spp., Cercospora leafspot caused by Cercospora spp., and leaf mosaic virus. For information on control methods go to: Cercospora leafspot can be controlled with copper oxychloride, Captan, Maneb, Zineb and Ziram.

=== Pests ===
- Rootknot nematodes (Meloidogyne spp.) attack the roots. For information on control methods go to:
- Bean flower thrips (Megalurothrips sjostedti)
- Peanut bud necrosis virus
- Blister beetles (Coleoptera) eat the leaves and growing tips.
- Green vegetable bug (Nezara viridula) decreases seed production by destroying developing pods.
- Pod borers harm seed crops by destroying growing tips.

== Genetic Stocks ==
There are germplasm collections kept at the IRRI in Los Baños, Philippines, by ORSTOM in Dakar, Senegal, and by CSIRO in Australia, and a small number of accessions are kept at the Southern Regional Plant Introduction Station in Georgia, USA.

== Uses/applications ==
S. rostrata is primarily used as a green manure to improve soil fertility. It can accumulate 100 kg/ha of nitrogen in 50 days. It can be used in alley-cropping systems and as a trap crop for insect pests in soybean and for nematodes such as Hirschmanniella oryzae and H. spinicaudata, which affect rice crops. It is used for livestock feed, it is eaten by sheep, goats, and sometimes camels, but unpalatable to cattle. In some countries leaves are eaten by people, and it is also a source of fuelwood, dry stems serve as a fuel in Madagascar.

== Nutritional value ==
S. rostrata provides a readily available source of crude protein (CP) content for livestock which can be especially beneficial for small-scale farming.

== Practical information ==
=== Inoculation of seeds ===
In many soils, especially where new tree species are being incorporated the appropriate Rhizobium strain is not present. This is one of the main problems a farmer may face when incorporating S. rostrata in their fields. Inoculants can be purchased from private companies or obtained from non-profit organizations. A cost-effective and practical seed inoculation method would be the slurry method. The inoculant can also be applied right into the soil but this method may be more expensive. The N2Africa seed inoculation practical guide and the FAO pocket manual on legume inoculants provide detailed information on inoculation methods.

=== Dual inoculation ===
The dual inoculation of S. rostrata with Funneliformis mosseae and Azorhizobium caulinodans has been shown to increase plant height, as well as concentration and uptake of nitrogen (N) and phosphorus (P) in shoots and roots. Vesicular-arbuscular mycorrhizal fungi (VAM) increases P uptake in plants even in soils low in P. The symbiosis between a leguminous tree, Rhizobium and mycorrhizal fungi, increases nodulation, nitrogen fixation, and growth. N-fixation needs an optimal and constant supply of P to the root and nodules. Due to the low P availability in tropical soils this application would be especially useful in the tropics.

=== Constraints to wider adoption ===
Some limitations to growing S. rostrata include lack of access to seeds, seed production and propagation from seed is labour-intensive, prone to insect attack, unpalatable to cattle. Other factors that influence the adoption of new technologies by poor farmers include land ownership, low levels of awareness, land size, employment status, belonging to a farm group, training, labour, local institutions, etc.
