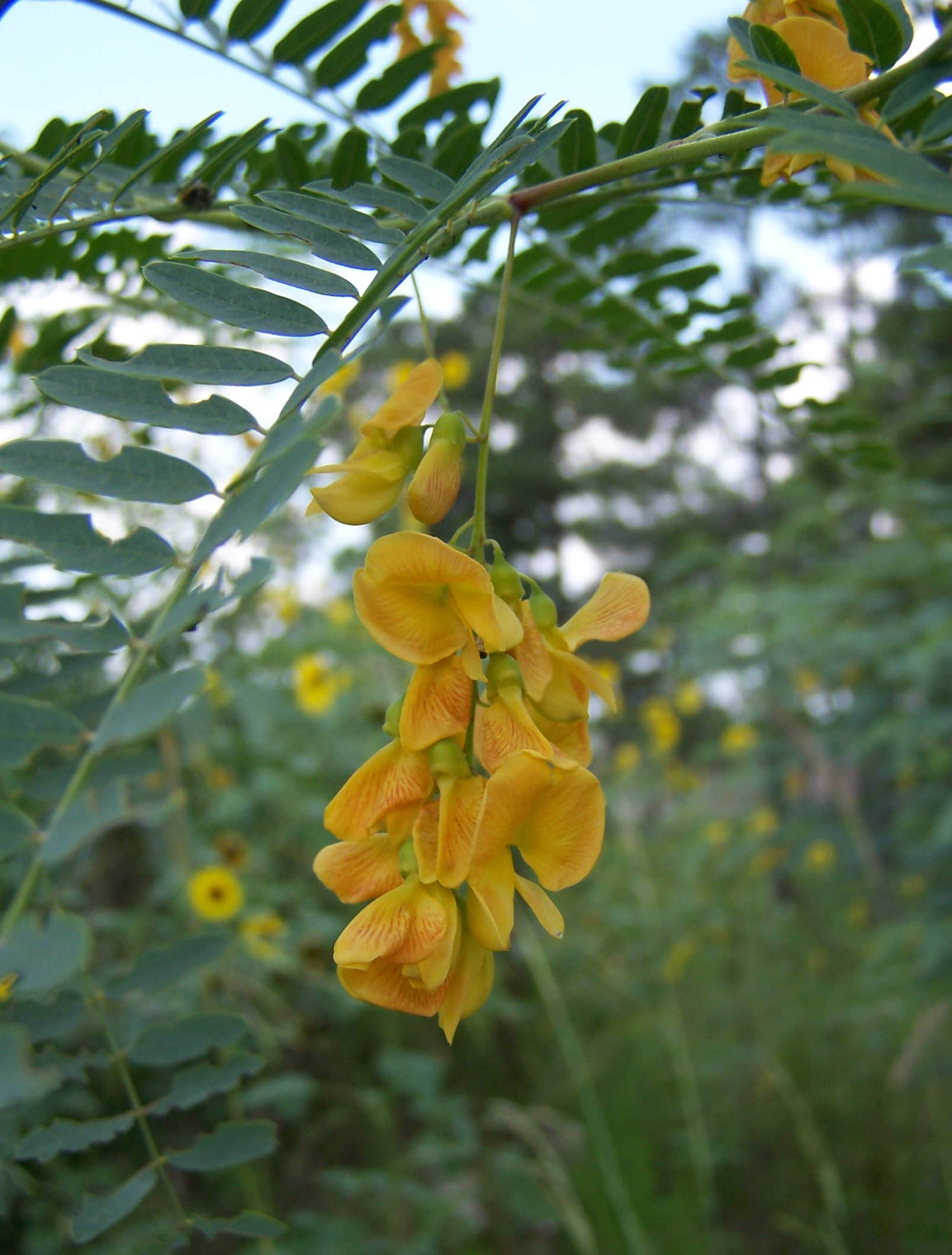
- Sesbania drummondii

Scientific classification
- Kingdom: Plantae
- Clade: Embryophytes
- Clade: Tracheophytes
- Clade: Angiosperms
- Clade: Eudicots
- Clade: Rosids
- Order: Fabales
- Family: Fabaceae
- Subfamily: Faboideae
- Clade: Meso-Papilionoideae
- Clade: Non-protein amino acid-accumulating clade
- Clade: Hologalegina
- Clade: Robinioids
- Tribe: Sesbanieae; Hutch.
- Genus: Sesbania; Adans. (1763), nom. & orth. cons.

Species
- 60; see text

Synonyms
- Agati Adans. (1763), nom. rej.; Darwinia Raf. (1817), nom. illeg.; Daubentonia DC. (1826); Daubentoniopsis Rydb. (1923); Glottidium Desv.(1813); Monoplectra Raf. (1817); Resupinaria Raf. (1838); Sesban Adans. (1763), orth. var.

= Sesbania =

Genus of aquatic plants

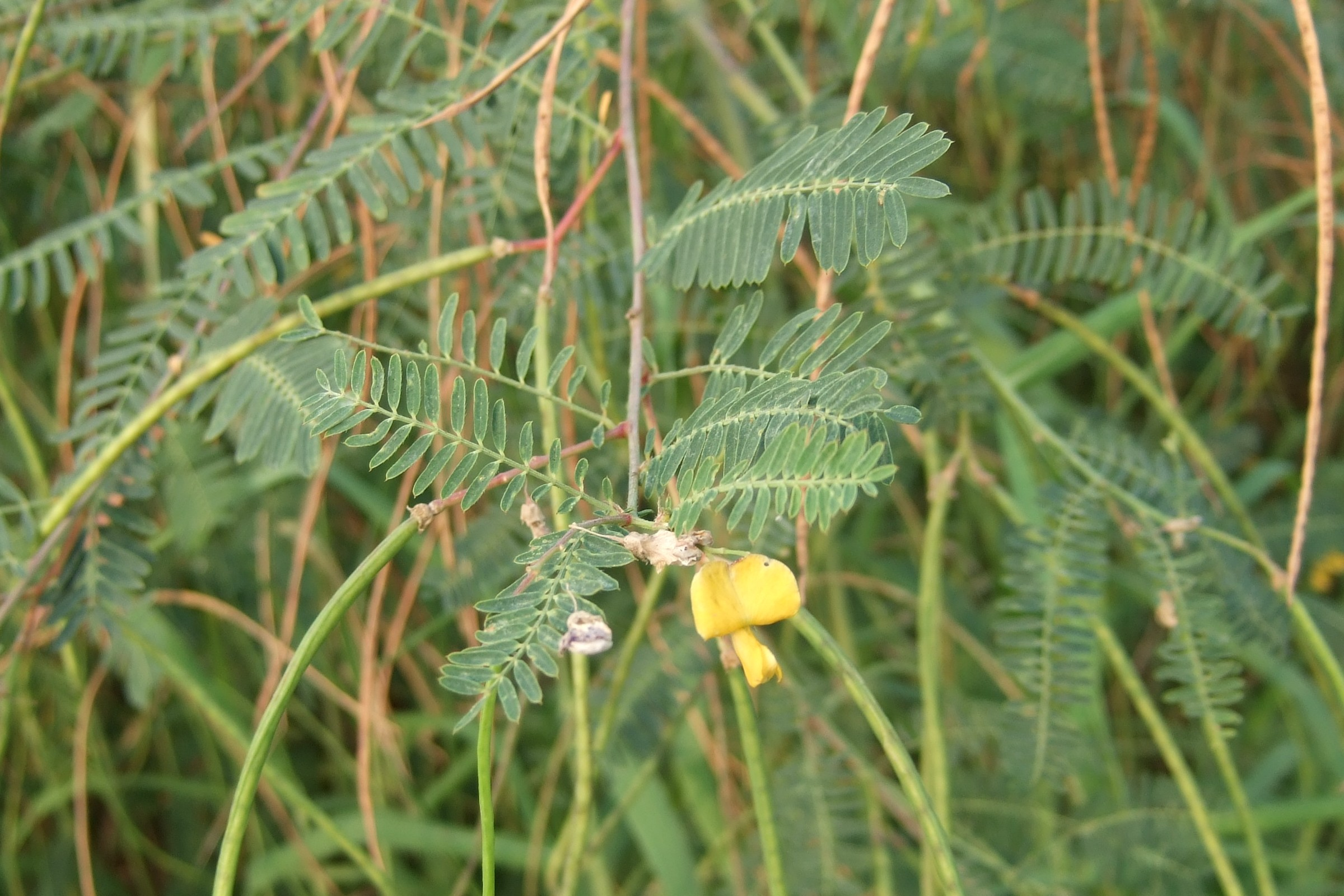
Sesbania cannabina

Sesbania is a genus of flowering plants in the pea family, Fabaceae, and the only genus found in tribe Sesbanieae. Riverhemp is a common name for plants in this genus. Notable species include the rattlebox (Sesbania punicea), spiny sesbania (Sesbania bispinosa), and Sesbania sesban, which is used in cooking. Plants of this genus, some of which are aquatic, can be used in alley cropping to increase the soil's nitrogen content. The species of rhizobia responsible for nitrogen fixation in Sesbania rostrata is Azorhizobium caulinodans.

Some 60 species are currently accepted, with about 39 still unresolved. The genus is native to tropical and subtropical regions around the world, in the Americas from the southern United States to northern Argentina, in sub-Saharan Africa, in southern Asia, and in New Guinea, Australia, and the Pacific. The largest number of species are found in Africa, and the remainder in Australia, Hawaii, and Asia.

== Fossil record ==
Fossil seed pods from the upper Oligocene resembling Sesbania have been found in the Hungarian locality of Eger Wind-brickyard. The fossil species grew in a swampy and riparian environment.

== List of species ==
60 species are accepted, organized into three sections:

=== Section Glottidium (Desvaux) Lavin ===
- Sesbania vesicaria (Jacq.) Elliott

=== Section Daubentonia (DC.) Bentham ===
- Sesbania drummondii (Rydb.) Cory
- Sesbania cavanillesii S.Watson
- Sesbania macroptera Micheli
- Sesbania punicea (Cav.) Benth. – rattlebox
- Sesbania virgata (Cav.) Poir. – wand riverhemp

=== Section Sesbania Adans. ===
- Sesbania benthamiana Domin
- Sesbania bispinosa (Jacq.) W.Wight
- Sesbania brachycarpa F.Muell.
- Sesbania brevipeduncula J.B.Gillett
- Sesbania campylocarpa (Domin) N.T.Burb.
- Sesbania cannabina (Retz.) Poir.
- Sesbania chippendalei N.T.Burb.
- Sesbania cinerascens Welw. ex Baker
- Sesbania coccinea (L.f.) Poir.
- Sesbania coerulescens Harms
- Sesbania concolor J.B.Gillett
- Sesbania dalzielii E.Phillips & Hutch.
- Sesbania dummeri E.Phillips & Hutch.
- Sesbania erubescens (Benth.) N.T.Burb.
- Sesbania exasperata Kunth
- Sesbania formosa (F.Muell.) N.T.Burb.
- Sesbania goetzei Harms
- Sesbania grandiflora (L.) Poir.
- Sesbania greenwayi J.B.Gillett
- Sesbania hepperi J.B.Gillett
- Sesbania herbacea (Mill.) McVaugh – bigpod sesbania
- Sesbania hirtistyla J.B.Gillett
- Sesbania javanica Miq.
- Sesbania keniensis J.B.Gillett
- Sesbania leptocarpa DC.
- Sesbania macowaniana Schinz
- Sesbania macrantha Welw. ex E.Phillips & Hutch.
- Sesbania madagascariensis Du Puy & Labat
- Sesbania melanocaulis Bidgood & Friis
- Sesbania microphylla Harm.
- Sesbania mossambicensis Klotzsch
- Sesbania notialis J.B.Gillett
- Sesbania oligosperma Taub.
- Sesbania pachycarpa DC.
- Sesbania paucisemina J.B.Gillett
- Sesbania procumbens Wright & Arn.
- Sesbania quadrata J.B.Gillett
- Sesbania rostrata Bremek. & Oberm.
- Sesbania sericea (Willd.) Link – papagayo
- Sesbania sesban (L.) Merr. – Egyptian riverhemp
- Sesbania simpliciuscula F.Muell. ex Benth.
- Sesbania somalensis J.B.Gillett
- Sesbania speciosa Taub. ex Engl.
- Sesbania sphaerocarpa Welw.
- Sesbania subalata J.B.Gillett
- Sesbania sudanica J.B.Gillett
- Sesbania tetraptera Hochst. ex Baker
- Sesbania tomentosa Hook. & Arn. – Ōhai (Hawaii)
- Sesbania transvaalensis J.B.Gillett

=== Incertae Sedis ===
- Sesbania burbidgeae C.L.Gross
- Sesbania emerus (Aubl.) Urban – coffeebean
- Sesbania longifolia DC.
- Sesbania marchionica F.Br.
- Sesbania muelleri C.L.Gross
- Sesbania uliginosa (Roxb.) G.Don
- Sesbania wildemannii E.Phillips

== Phylogeny ==
Modern molecular phylogenetics suggest the following relationships between the species of Sesbania:

- - Loteae (outgroup)
  - Sesbania
    - New World Clade
      - Sect. Glottidium
        Sesbania vesicaria
      - Sect. Daubentonia
        - Sesbania cavanillesii
        - - Sesbania drummondii
          - Sesbania punicea
        - - Sesbania macroptera
          - Sesbania virgata
    - Pantropical Clade Sect. Sesbania
      - - Sesbania herbacea
        - - - Sesbania cannabina
            - Sesbania sericea
          - Sesbania tomentosa
      - - Sesbania rostrata
        - - - - Sesbania sphaerosperma
              - - Sesbania brevipedunculata
                - Sesbania pachycarpa
            - - Sesbania coerulescens
              - Sesbania macrantha
          - - Sesbania cinerascens
            - Sesbania leptocarpa
            - Sesbania transvaalensis
            - Sesbania macowaniana
            - - Sesbania exasperata
              - Sesbania oligosperma
            - - Sesbania bispinosa
              - - Sesbania dalzielii
                - Sesbania sudanica
            - - Sesbania somalensis
              - - Sesbania quadrata
                - Sesbania subalata
            - - Sesbania hirtistyla
              - - Sesbania tetraptera
                - - Sesbania greenwayi
                  - Sesbania hobdyi
            - - - Sesbania microphylla
                - - Sesbania campylocarpa
                  - - Sesbania grandiflora
                    - - Sesbania formosa
                      - - Sesbania brachycarpa
                        - Sesbania chippendalei
              - - - Sesbania dummeri
                  - - Sesbania goatzei
                    - Sesbania keniensis
                - - Sesbania madagascariensis
                  - - Sesbania melanocaulis
                    - Sesbania sesban
