= Sesbania sudanica =

Scientific classification
- Kingdom: Plantae
- Clade: Tracheophytes
- Clade: Angiosperms
- Clade: Eudicots
- Clade: Rosids
- Order: Fabales
- Family: Fabaceae
- Subfamily: Faboideae
- Genus: Sesbania
- Species: S. sudanica

Binomial name
- Sesbania sudanica J.B.Gillett

Synonyms
- Sesbania sudanica subsp. occidentalis J.B.Gillett

Species of flowering plant

Sesbania sudanica is a species of flowering plant in the family Fabaceae. It is an annual plant native to Africa, and was described in 1963.

== Taxonomy ==
The species was described by Jan Bevington Gillett in 1963.

== Distribution ==
Sesbania sudanica is native to the seasonally dry tropical biome of Benin, Burkina Faso, Cameroon, the Central African Republic, Chad, Ethiopia, Ghana, Liberia, Mali, Nigeria, Sudan, South Sudan, and Togo. It grows in tall grass, open forests, and deciduous woodlands.

== Description ==
Sesbania sudanica is an annual plant. It grows 1–5 metres (3.3–16.4 ft) tall.
