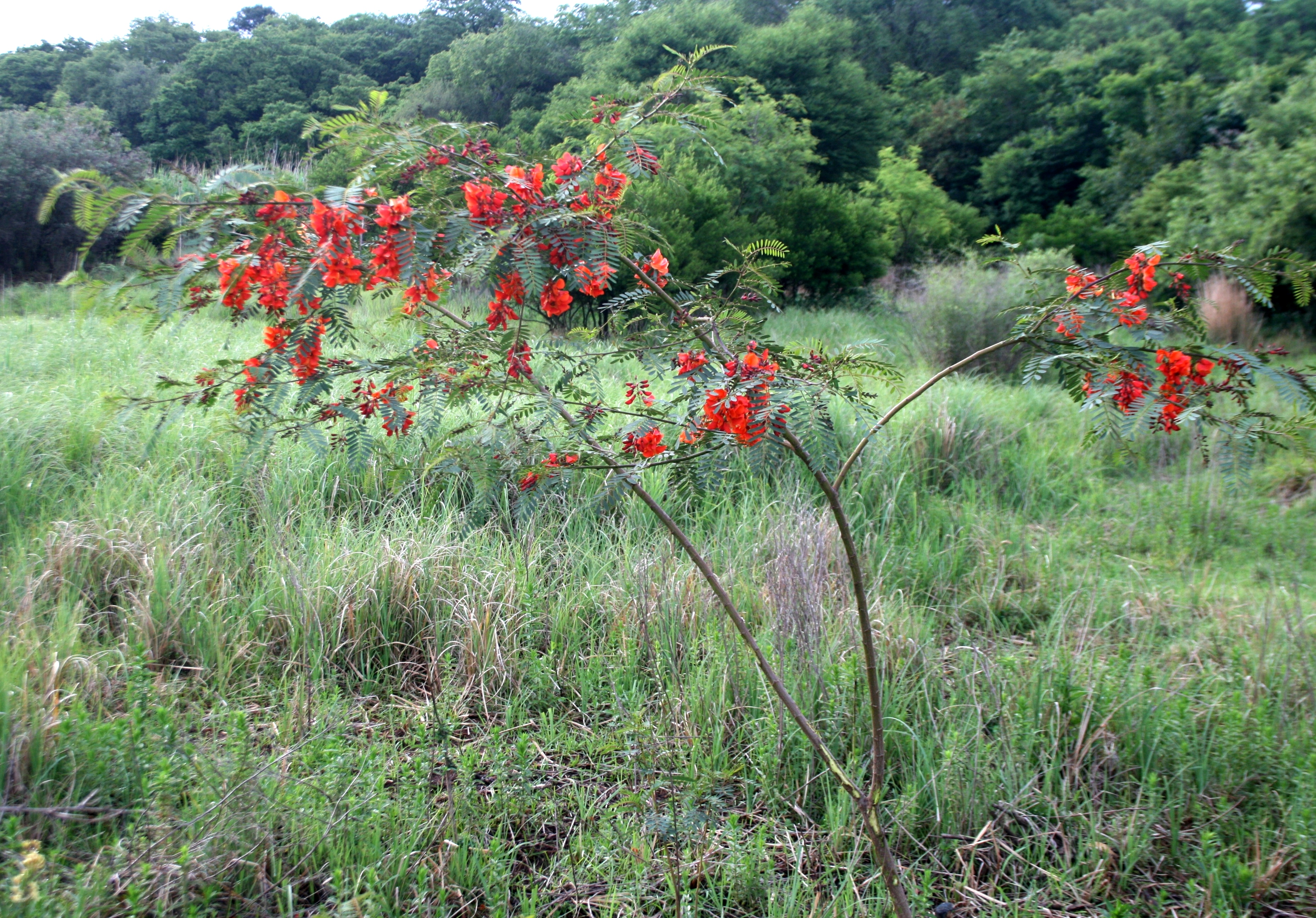

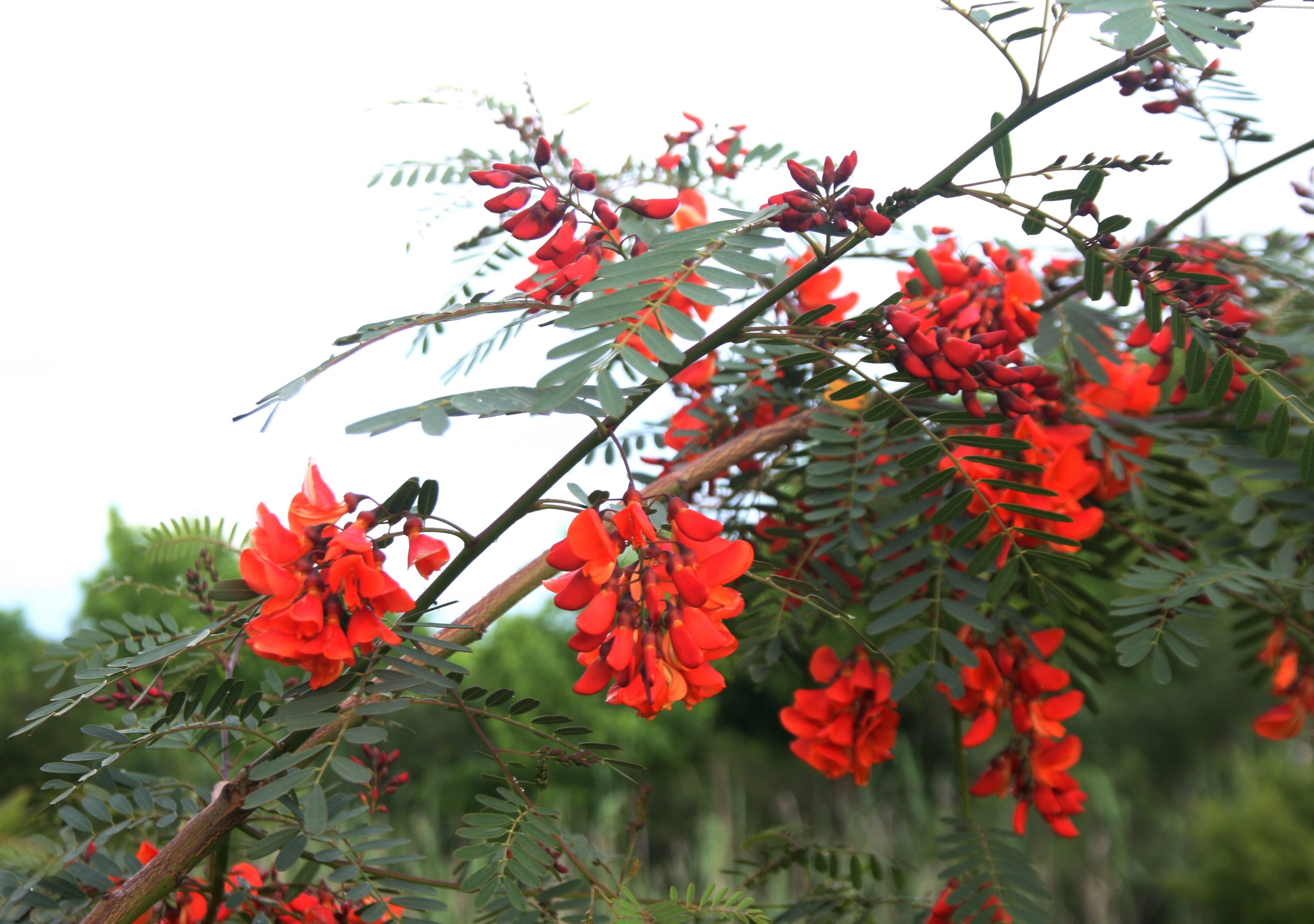
- Habit and inflorescences in South Africa

Conservation status
- Least Concern (IUCN 3.1)

Scientific classification
- Kingdom: Plantae
- Clade: Tracheophytes
- Clade: Angiosperms
- Clade: Eudicots
- Clade: Rosids
- Order: Fabales
- Family: Fabaceae
- Subfamily: Faboideae
- Genus: Sesbania
- Species: S. punicea

Binomial name
- Sesbania punicea (Cav.) Benth.

= Sesbania punicea =

Species of legume

Sesbania punicea (Spanish gold, rattlebox, or scarlet sesban) is an ornamental shrub with reddish-orange flowers native to South America. It has deciduous leaves and grows to a height of 15 feet (4.5 m). This plant has a high demand for water, and thrives in swamps or wet areas. It requires a mildly acidic soil, with a pH between 6.1 and 6.5.

== Distribution ==
The species is native to Brazil, Argentina, Paraguay and Uruguay. It has spread to other parts of South America and many coastal southern United States as well as to parts of Africa. Due to its high demand for water, this species is often found on marshy shorelines. It also forms dense thickets and thrives in disturbed areas.

== Taxonomy ==
The genus Sesbania is within the larger family Fabaceae. The Fabaceae are divided into three subfamilies:

- Mimosoideae (80 genera and 3,200 species)
  - Caesalpinioideae (170 genera and 2,000 species)
    - Faboideae (470 genera and 14,000 species)

The genus Sesbania belongs to the subfamily Faboideae, which has the greatest amount of diversity within the family Fabaceae. The subfamilies Mimosoideae and Faboideae are largely monophyletic, whereas the subfamily Caesalpinioideae is considered paraphyletic.

== Habitat and ecology ==
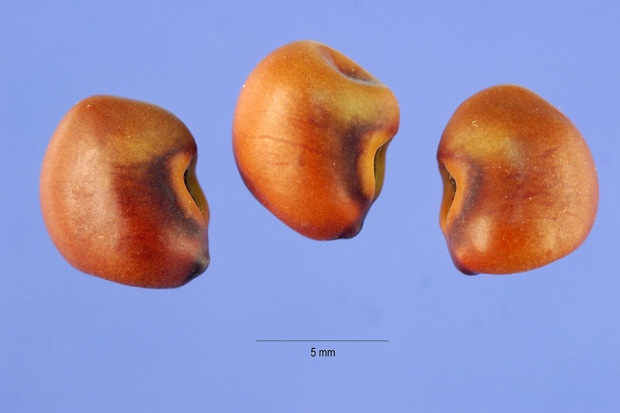
S. punicea seed

Flowers appear in late spring and persist until the autumn. In the United States, this species blooms between June and September, in South Africa between November and January.

When the carpellous structures dry out, the seeds drop close to the base of the plant. The seed coats are impermeable, which means they can be dispersed by water. This impermeability is caused by callose. Hence, they are often found near rivers and brooks. This species is also commonly found near roadsides, maybe the seeds were imported with the soil used for construction. This species is shade-tolerant. Seedlings can produce flowers and seeds after three month, although flowering most commonly occurs at two years of age. The plant can survive frost, but not for prolonged periods of time .

== Morphology ==
The deciduous leaves are alternate and compound. Between five and 20 pairs of elliptical leaflets occur on a single stalk. The leaf margins are commonly entire, with little or no serration. Each leaflet is oblong and ends in a pointy tip. The leaves contain stipules that are usually inconspicuous. The flowers and fruits droop at the tips of the stalks. The branches of this shrub are rather thin, and green, but turn a darker red brown when they mature. The bark varies from gray brown to red brown with obvious horizontal lenticels.

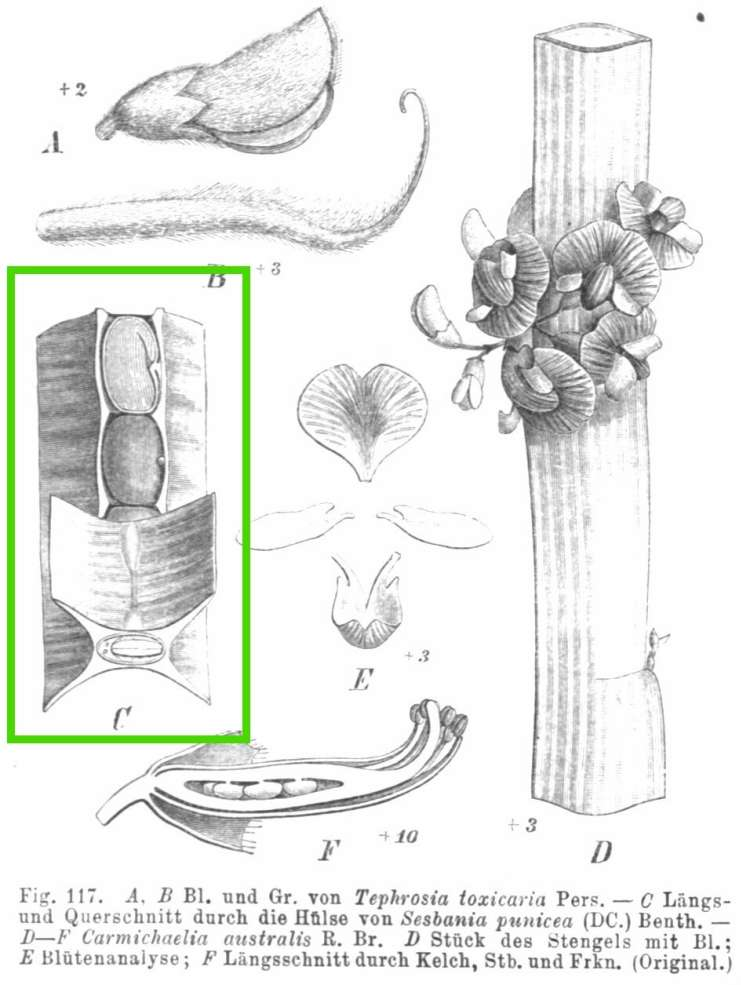
Sketch of S. punicea in 1891

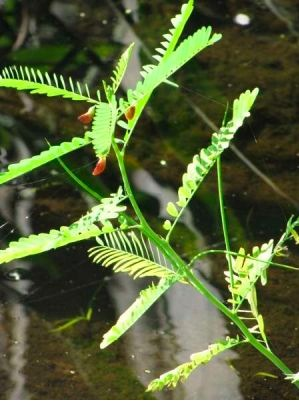
Herbaceous habit of S. punicea

== Flowers and fruit ==
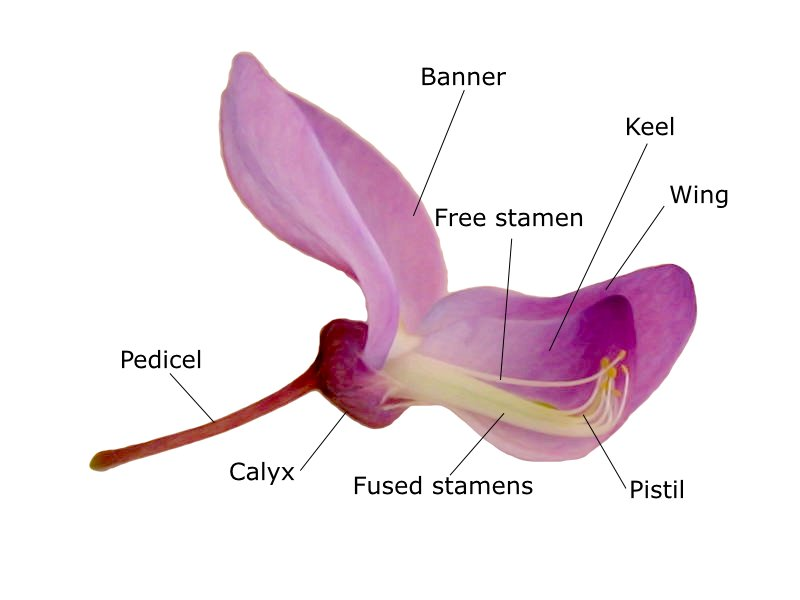
A flower of Wisteria sinensis, Faboideae: Example of flower structure for the subfamily Faboideae (two petals are removed to show the stamens and pistil.)

The flowers are shaped like pea flowers, 2–3 cm long, and are commonly red-orange or red-purple. Flowers often form a raceme. Characteristic of the family Fabaceae, this species has five fused sepals and five free petals. The flower always contains ten stamens, sometimes with various combinations of fused filaments. The ovary is superior and the style is often curved. Characteristic of the subfamily Faboideae, these flowers are zygomorphic and have a specialized structure. The upper petal is referred to as the banner, and encapsulates the petals when they are in the bud. The two adjacent flowers, called the wings, overlap the bottom two petals. The bottom petals are often fused at the apex, forming a keel. The flowers appear "showy" because they are most commonly pollinated by insects, who are attracted by these features.

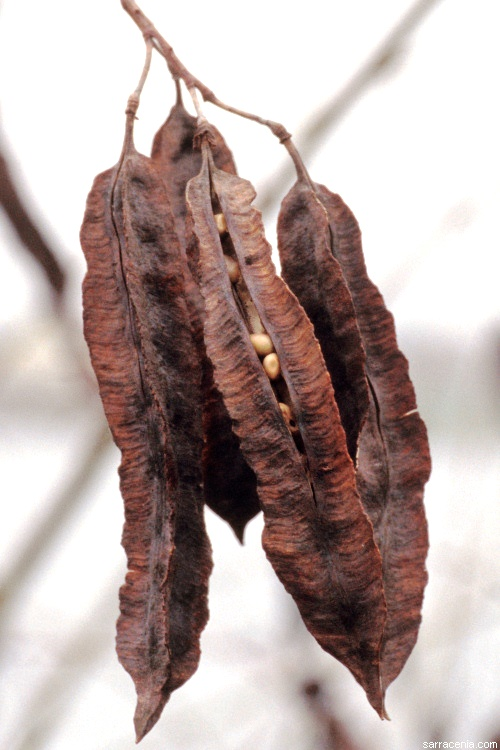
Sesbania punicea fruit or dehiscing seed pods

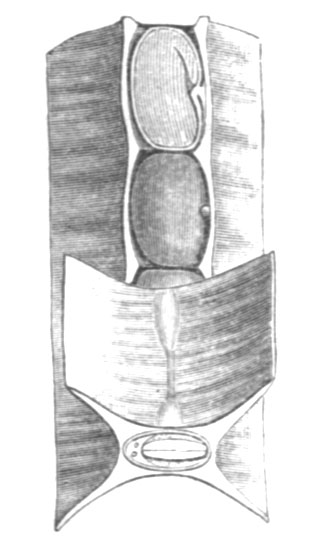
Illustration of placentation of seeds inside the pods of S. punicea

The large pea pods are divided into four compartments and appear as if they have shrunk slightly due to drying. These fruits are dehiscent and dry out as they become mature. Each fruit can contain between five and ten seeds, which are dispersed when the pod dries out and opens up. On average, a single plant can produce 100–300 pods. The immature pods are a yellow or green. As the season progresses, they turn a darker green, eventually becoming dark brown. Seedpods often stay on the plant far into the winter, and the seeds rattle when shaken by the wind, giving the plant its common name of "rattlebox".

== Usage and economic importance ==
These plants are used as ornamentals due to their graceful shape and beautiful red flowers. It can easily be grown from seeds, which require scarification in order to germinate. The species has been classified as invasive in many of the southern United States such as Virginia, California, Texas, and Florida. This shrub can often form dense thickets. It is replacing native species of plants in riparian areas, taking food resources away from the local wildlife. In addition, this species contributes to riverbank erosion and flooding. It has been declared a noxious weed and/or seed in the United States in the aquatic, terrestrial, and seed forms.

This plant has no known economic or medicinal uses. Its close relative S. virgata has been used to control soil erosion, rehabilitate disturbed areas, and revitalize riparian habitats. Juice made from the leaves of this plant reduces the response to painful stimulation and inflammatory edema in mice.

== Toxicity ==
Sesbania puniceas contains toxic saponic glycosides. The poison can be dangerous to local birds and mammals. Humans who ingest this plant or its seeds may become very sick and may suffer vomiting, diarrhea, respiratory failure, and death.

== Management ==
The root systems of young S. punicea plants are not very extensive and the soil is loose under waterlogged conditions, so these plants can be removed by hand or simple garden tools. Trees with larger trunks can be cut and treated with glyphosate and/or triclopyr. If they are found in standing water, the stem can be cut to below the water level. Simply flooding the area will not kill them.

Biological controls have also been used to prevent this species from spreading. The South American apionid weevil, Trichapion lativentre, was introduced to South Africa in the late 1970s. This weevil has now dispersed over most of the range of S. punicea. The adult weevils feed on the leaves and lay single eggs in premature flower buds. The larvae then feed on the stamens and carpels of the flower and pupate in the hollow husks of the buds. The weevil has prevented the rapid spread of S. punicea in South Africa.
