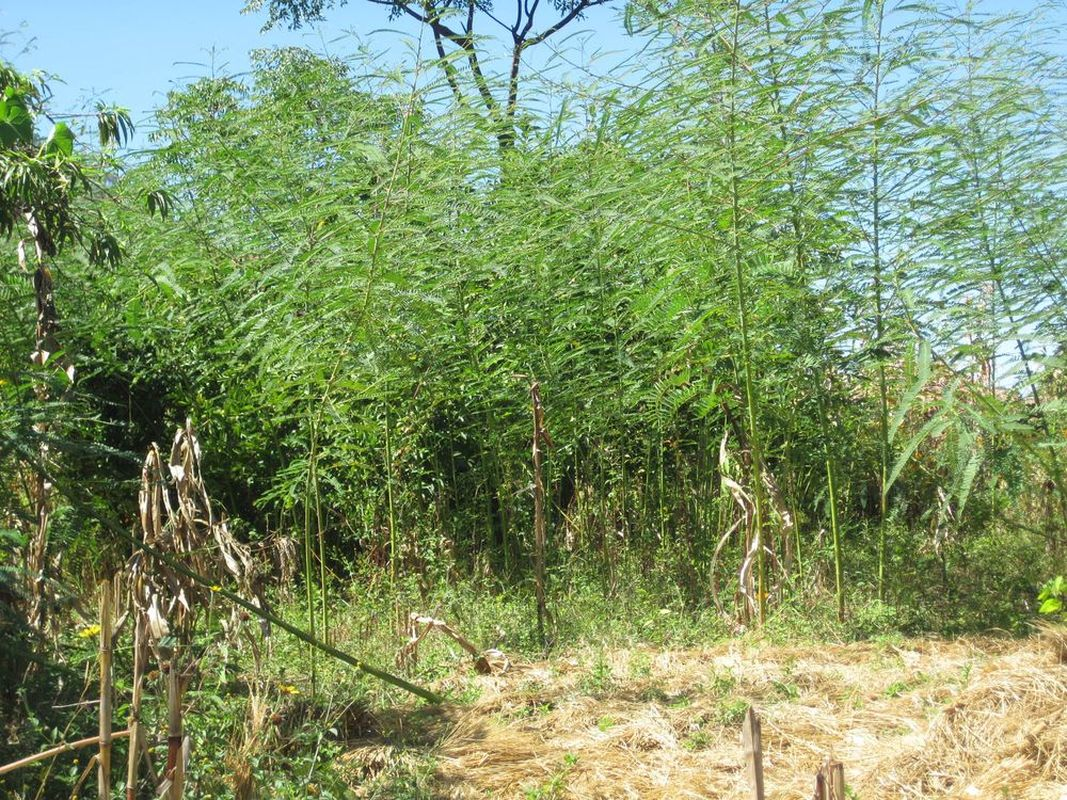

Conservation status
- Least Concern (IUCN 3.1)

Scientific classification
- Kingdom: Plantae
- Clade: Embryophytes
- Clade: Tracheophytes
- Clade: Spermatophytes
- Clade: Angiosperms
- Clade: Eudicots
- Clade: Rosids
- Order: Fabales
- Family: Fabaceae
- Subfamily: Faboideae
- Genus: Sesbania
- Species: S. madagascariensis

Binomial name
- Sesbania madagascariensis Du Puy & Labat

= Sesbania madagascariensis =

Species of flowering plant

Sesbania madagascariensis is a species of flowering plant in the family Fabaceae. It is a shrub endemic to Madagascar. The species was described in 1997, and is listed as of Least Concern by the International Union for Conservation of Nature.

== Taxonomy ==
The species was described in 1997. The holotype was collected in 1989, 12 kilometres (7.5 mi) north of Isoanala, Madagascar.

== Distribution ==
Sesbania madagascariensis is native to the seasonally dry tropical biome of Madagascar. It is endemic to Madagascar, and grows in Fianarantsoa, Mahajanga, Toliara. The species is present in dry, subarid regions, grasslands, and freshwater wetlands, and grows on sandy and clay soils.

Sesbania madagascariensis grows at elevations of up to 950 metres (3,120 ft). Its extent of occurrence is 373,659 square kilometres (144,271 sq mi).

== Description ==
Sesbania madagascariensis is a shrub that flowers from January to September.

== Uses ==
Sesbania madagascariensis is used in medicine.

== Conservation ==
In 2015, the IUCN assessed Sesbania madagascariensis as of Least Concern. There are thirty-seven sub-populations. It is present in five protected areas: Andringitra National Park, Tsingy de Bemaraha National Park, Tsingy de Namoroka National Park, Beza Mahafaly Special Reserve, and Andohahela National Park.

The species may be threatened by annual wildfires.

== Names ==
In the Malagasy language, the species is known as Kitsankitsana, Katsakatsa, Kasakasa, or Kantsakantsa.
