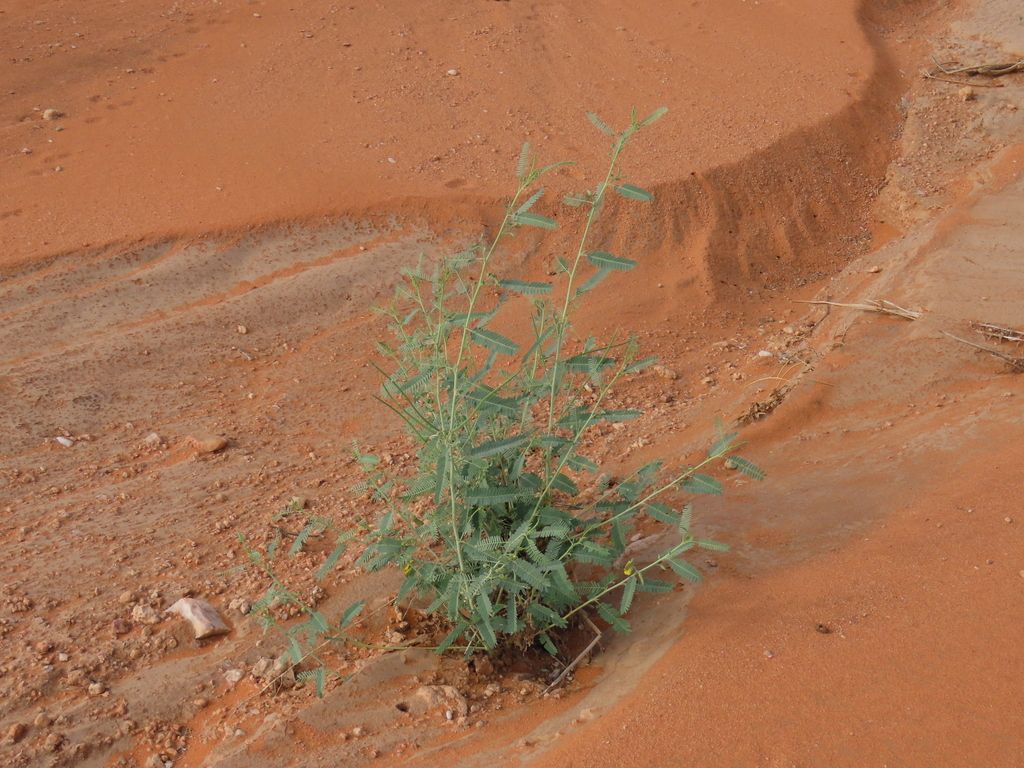

Conservation status
- Least Concern (IUCN 3.1)

Scientific classification
- Kingdom: Plantae
- Clade: Embryophytes
- Clade: Tracheophytes
- Clade: Spermatophytes
- Clade: Angiosperms
- Clade: Eudicots
- Clade: Rosids
- Order: Fabales
- Family: Fabaceae
- Subfamily: Faboideae
- Genus: Sesbania
- Species: S. pachycarpa

Binomial name
- Sesbania pachycarpa DC.

Subspecies
- Sesbania pachycarpa subsp. dinteriana J.B.Gillett; Sesbania pachycarpa subsp. pachycarpa

= Sesbania pachycarpa =

Species of flowering plant

Sesbania pachycarpa is a species of flowering plant in the family Fabaceae. It is a semi-woody plant with yellow flowers, curved fruits, and brown seeds. The species has a wide distribution across Africa.

Sesbania pachycarpa was described in 1925, and is listed as of Least Concern by the IUCN.

== Taxonomy ==
The species was described by Augustin Pyramus de Candolle in 1825.

Two subspecies are recognised:

- Sesbania pachycarpa subsp. dinteriana J.B.Gillett - Native to Angola and Namibia
- Sesbania pachycarpa subsp. pachycarpa

== Distribution ==
Sesbania pachycarpa is native to the seasonally dry tropical biome of Africa (Angola, Benin, Burkina Faso, Cameroon, Cape Verde, Central African Republic, Chad, Republic of the Congo, Djibouti, Democratic Republic of the Congo, Eritrea, Ethiopia, Gabon, Gambia, Ghana, Guinea, Guinea-Bissau, Ivory Coast, Mali, Mauritania, Namibia, Niger, Nigeria, Senegal, Sierra Leone, Sudan, South Sudan, Togo, and Uganda) and Yemen. It grows at elevations of up to 1,200 metres (3,900 ft).

The species grows in humid places, temporary swamps, Sorghum and Arachis fields, sandy-clay hollows, roadsides, riverbanks, damp sandy thickets, and in deep soil on plateaus.

== Description ==
Sesbania pachycarpa is a semi-woody annual, biennial, or subshrub. It grows 2–5 feet (61–152 cm) high. The plant has thirty to sixty pairs of leaflets. The leaflets are up to 22 millimetres (0.87 in) long, and up to 5 millimetres (0.20 in) wide.

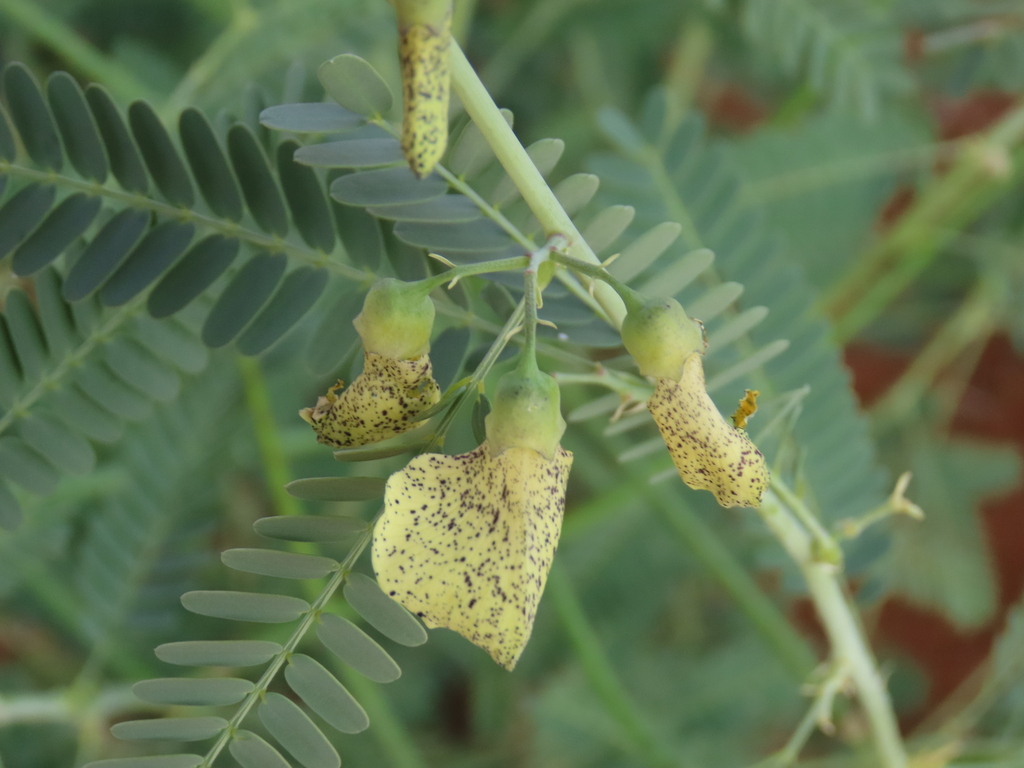
Flowers

The inflorescence has three to eighteen flowers. The inflorescence stem is up to 1.5 centimetres (0.59 in) long. The flower stems are 6–11 millimetres (0.24–0.43 in) long. The calyx tube is around 4 millimetres (0.16 in) long, and has broadly triangular teeth. The flowers are yellow, and the posterior petal has purple spots.

The fruit is a slightly curved pod that is 14–20 centimetres (5.5–7.9 in) long, and 3–5 millimetres (0.12–0.20 in) wide. The pod has twenty to thirty brown seeds.

== Conservation ==
In 2019, the IUCN assessed Sesbania pachycarpa as of Least Concern. It has a wide distribution, and the population is assumed to be large. The species faces no major threats.
