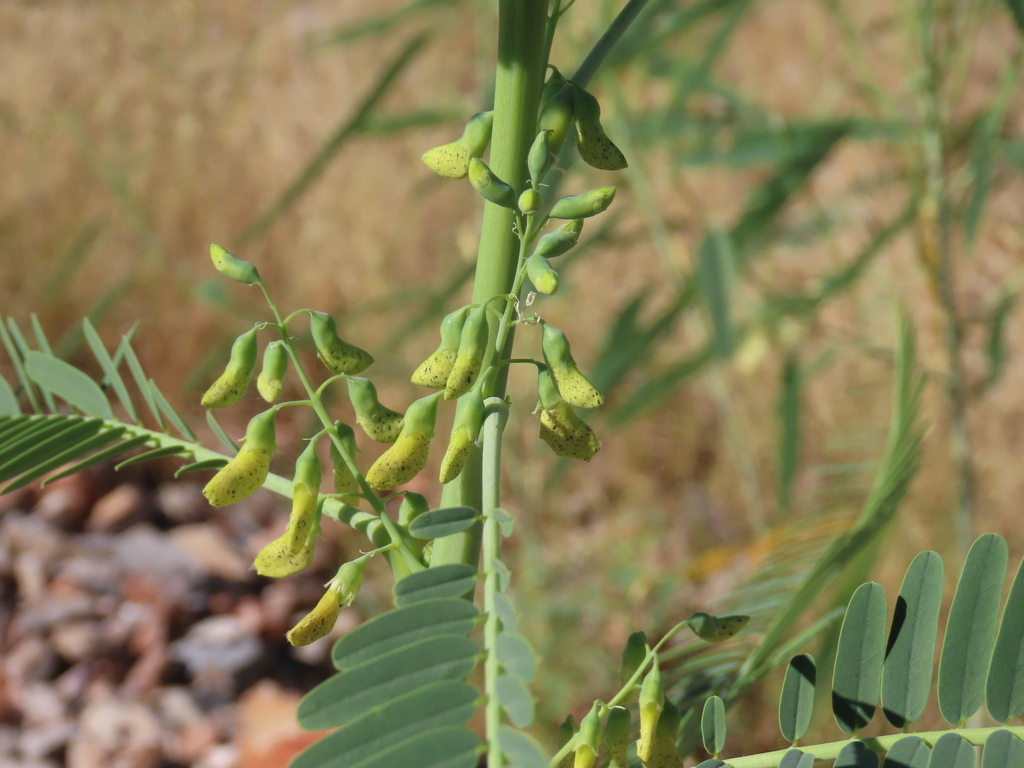

Scientific classification
- Kingdom: Plantae
- Clade: Embryophytes
- Clade: Tracheophytes
- Clade: Angiosperms
- Clade: Eudicots
- Clade: Rosids
- Order: Fabales
- Family: Fabaceae
- Subfamily: Faboideae
- Genus: Sesbania
- Species: S. sphaerocarpa

Binomial name
- Sesbania sphaerocarpa Welw.

Synonyms
- Emerus sphaerospermus (Welw.) Kuntze; Sesbania pterocarpa Welw. ex Romariz; Sesbania sphaerosperma Welw. ex Baker

= Sesbania sphaerocarpa =

Species of flowering plant

Sesbania sphaerocarpa is a species of flowering plant in the family Fabaceae. It is an annual shrub native to Angola and Namibia. The species was described in 1859.

== Taxonomy ==
The species was described by Friedrich Welwitsch in 1859.

== Distribution ==
Sesbania sphaerocarpa is native to the deserts and dry shrublands of Angola and Namibia. It grows in dry hilly areas, moist bushy areas, and damp thickets. The species is present at altitudes of 160–1,200 metres (520–3,940 ft).

== Description ==
Sesbania sphaerocarpa is an annual plant. It is a slender shrub that grows 1–2 metres (3.3–6.6 ft) high. The stems are sometimes woody at the base. The branches may have short, hard protuberances.
