= Sesbania transvaalensis =

Conservation status
- Least Concern (IUCN 3.1)

Scientific classification
- Kingdom: Plantae
- Clade: Tracheophytes
- Clade: Angiosperms
- Clade: Eudicots
- Clade: Rosids
- Order: Fabales
- Family: Fabaceae
- Subfamily: Faboideae
- Genus: Sesbania
- Species: S. transvaalensis

Binomial name
- Sesbania transvaalensis J.B.Gillett

Species of flowering plant

Sesbania transvaalensis is a species of flowering plant in the family Fabaceae. It is an annual subshrub or herb with yellow flowers. The fruits are pods. The species is native to southern Africa.

Sesbania transvaalensis was described in 1963, and is listed as of Least Concern by the IUCN.

== Taxonomy ==
The species was described by Jan Bevington Gillett in 1963.

== Distribution ==
Sesbania transvaalensis is native to the deserts and dry shrublands of South Africa (Free State and Northern Provinces) and Botswana. It grows in freshwater swamps.

== Description ==
Sesbania transvaalensis is an annual subshrub or herb. It grows to around 1.5 metres (4.9 ft) tall.

The leaves are 6.4–9.5 centimetres (2.5–3.7 in) long, and have 3–7 millimetres (0.12–0.28 in) long stems. The leaflets are 3.5–10 millimetres (0.14–0.39 in) long, 1.5–3 millimetres (0.059–0.118 in) wide, oblong, and arranged into five to twenty pairs.

The inflorescence is a 1.6–9 centimetres (0.63–3.54 in) long raceme with five to seven flowers. The inflorescence stem is 1.5–3.9 centimetres (0.59–1.54 in) long. The calyx is 3–4 millimetres (0.12–0.16 in) long, 2.5–4 millimetres (0.098–0.157 in) wide, and has 1.5–1 millimetre (0.059–0.039 in) long teeth. The standard is suborbicular, 1–1.2 centimetres (0.39–0.47 in) long, 0.85–1.1 centimetres (0.33–0.43 in) wide, yellow, and has purple and red veins on the outer surface. The keel is 1.1–1.2 centimetres (0.43–0.47 in) long, 4–6 millimetres (0.16–0.24 in) wide, yellow, and has purple stripes.

The fruit is a 6–8.5 centimetres (2.4–3.3 in) long, 1.5–2.75 millimetres (0.059–0.108 in) wide pod, which may be slightly curved. The pod has seven to twelve seeds, which are around 3 millimetres (0.12 in) long, 1.75 millimetres (0.069 in) wide, 1.75–2 millimetres (0.069–0.079 in) thick, and brown, olive-green, or blackish in colour.

== Conservation ==
In 2005, the IUCN assessed Sesbania transvaalensis as of Least Concern. The species faces no major threats.
