= Sesbania mossambicensis =

Scientific classification
- Kingdom: Plantae
- Clade: Embryophytes
- Clade: Tracheophytes
- Clade: Spermatophytes
- Clade: Angiosperms
- Clade: Eudicots
- Clade: Rosids
- Order: Fabales
- Family: Fabaceae
- Subfamily: Faboideae
- Genus: Sesbania
- Species: S. mossambicensis

Binomial name
- Sesbania mossambicensis Klotzsch

Species of flowering plant

Sesbania mossambicensis is a species of flowering plant in the family Fabaceae. It is a herb around 1 metre (3.3 ft) high, with three to eight flowered inflorescences, and dark reddish-brown seeds. The species was described in 1861. It is native to Mozambique and Zambia.

== Taxonomy ==
The first description of the species, written by Johann Friedrich Klotzsch, was published in 1861. In 1988, Gwilym Peter Lewis placed Sesbania mossambicensis as a synonym of Sesbania leptocarpa.

== Distribution ==
The species is native to the seasonally dry tropical biome of Mozambique and Zambia.

== Description ==
Sesbania mossambicensis is a herb around 1 metre (3.3 ft) high. The leaves are 1.5–11 centimetres (0.59–4.33 in) long, and have 2–7 millimetres (0.079–0.276 in) stems. The plant has seven to thirty-three leaflets, which are yoke-like, oblong to oblong-linear, 0.3–1 centimetre (0.12–0.39 in) long, and have very short stems. The upper surfaces have minute black dots.

The inflorescence is 1–7 centimetres (0.39–2.76 in) long, and has three to eight flowers. The flower stems are 3–7 millimetres (0.12–0.28 in) long. The calyx is bell-shaped, 3–4 millimetres (0.12–0.16 in) long, 2–3 millimetres (0.079–0.118 in) wide, and has five dark brown bands. The keel is 0.9–1.2 centimetres (0.35–0.47 in) long, and 3–4 millimetres (0.12–0.16 in) wide.

The fruit is 4–6 centimetres (1.6–2.4 in) long, and resembles a string of beads. The seeds are dark reddish-brown, around 2.5 millimetres (0.098 in) long, and around 1.25 millimetres (0.049 in) wide. The seeds are oblong, and rounded at the ends.
