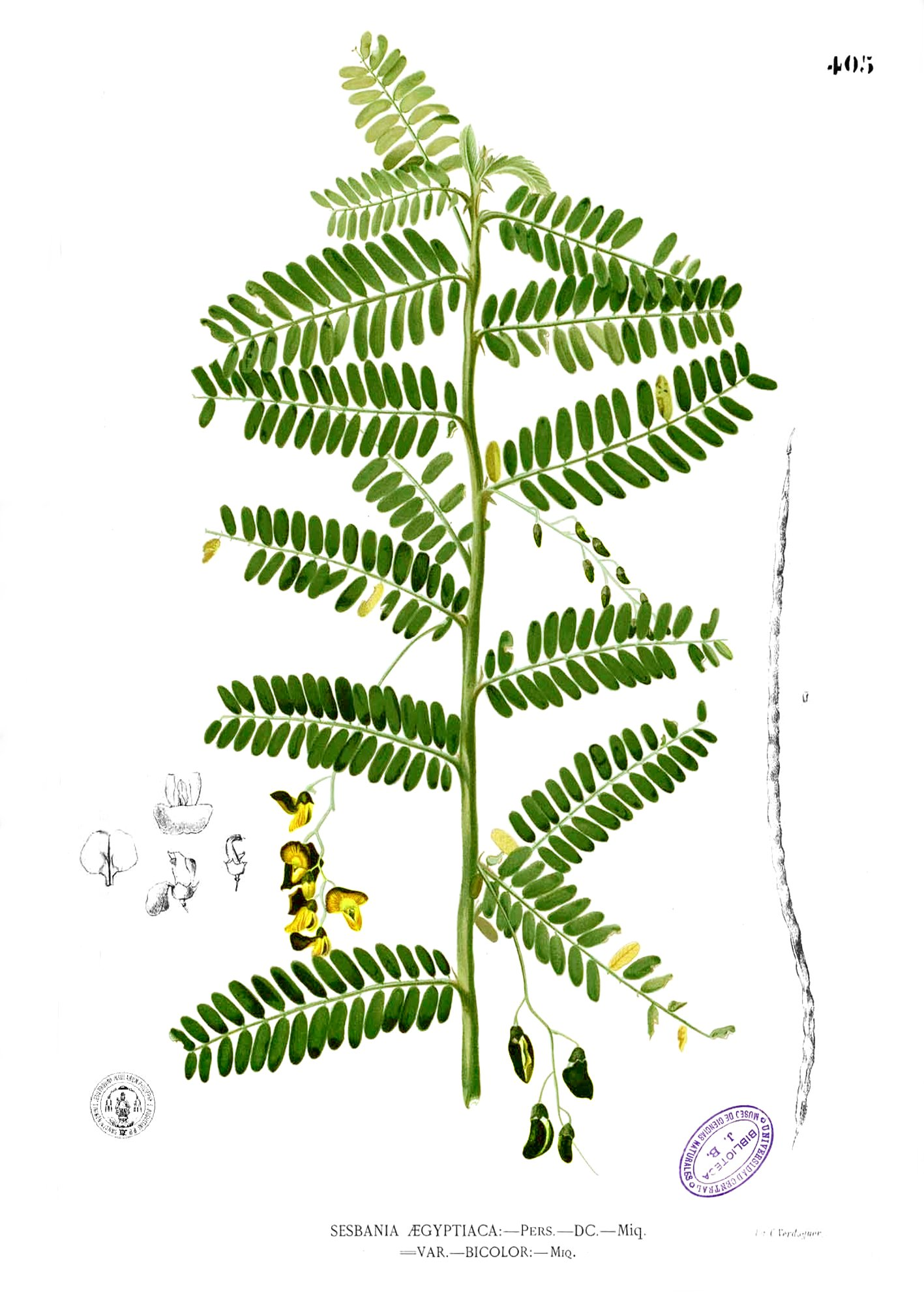

Scientific classification
- Kingdom: Plantae
- Clade: Tracheophytes
- Clade: Angiosperms
- Clade: Eudicots
- Clade: Rosids
- Order: Fabales
- Family: Fabaceae
- Subfamily: Faboideae
- Genus: Sesbania
- Species: S. sesban

Binomial name
- Sesbania sesban (L.) Merr.

= Sesbania sesban =

Species of legume

Sesbania sesban, the Egyptian riverhemp, is a species of plant in the legume family, a fast growing species, it has four varieties that are currently recognized.

Synonyms include:

- Aeschynomene aegyptiaca (Pers.) Steud.
- Aeschynomene sesban L.
- Emerus sesban (L.) Kuntze
- Sesbania aegyptiaca Poir.

== Description ==
A perennial shrub or small tree that grows up to 6 m tall sometimes reaching 8 m. It has paripinnately compound leaves with between 6-27 pairs of linear to oblong leaflets per pinnae; the leaves and rachis tend to be pilose. Flowers are yellow in color with brown and purple streaks on the corolla.

== Distribution and habitat ==
Sesbania sesban occurs widely in tropical East and West Africa, in Southern Africa and in Asia. Commonly found on a variety of soil types including loose sandy soil and clay soil, it grows in areas with annual rainfall of between 500-2000 mm.

== Infraspecies ==
- Sesbania sesban var. bicolor (Wight & Arn.) F.W.Andrews
- Sesbania sesban var. nubica Chiov.
- Sesbania sesban subsp. punctata (DC.) J.B.Gillett
- Sesbania sesban subsp. sesban

== Uses ==
Sesbania sesban is a nitrogen-fixing tree and may be useful in alley cropping. It is also used as a fodder crop and source of fuel wood.

== Relevant literature ==
- Ramni Jamnadass, Jean Hanson, Jane Poole, Olivier Hanotte, Tony J. Simons, Ian K. Dawson. High differentiation among populations of the woody legume Sesbania sesban in sub-Saharan Africa: Implications for conservation and cultivation during germplasm introduction into agroforestry systems. Forest Ecology and Management Volume 210, Issues 1–3, 2005, Pages 225–238, ISSN 0378-1127, https://doi.org/10.1016/j.foreco.2005.02.033.
