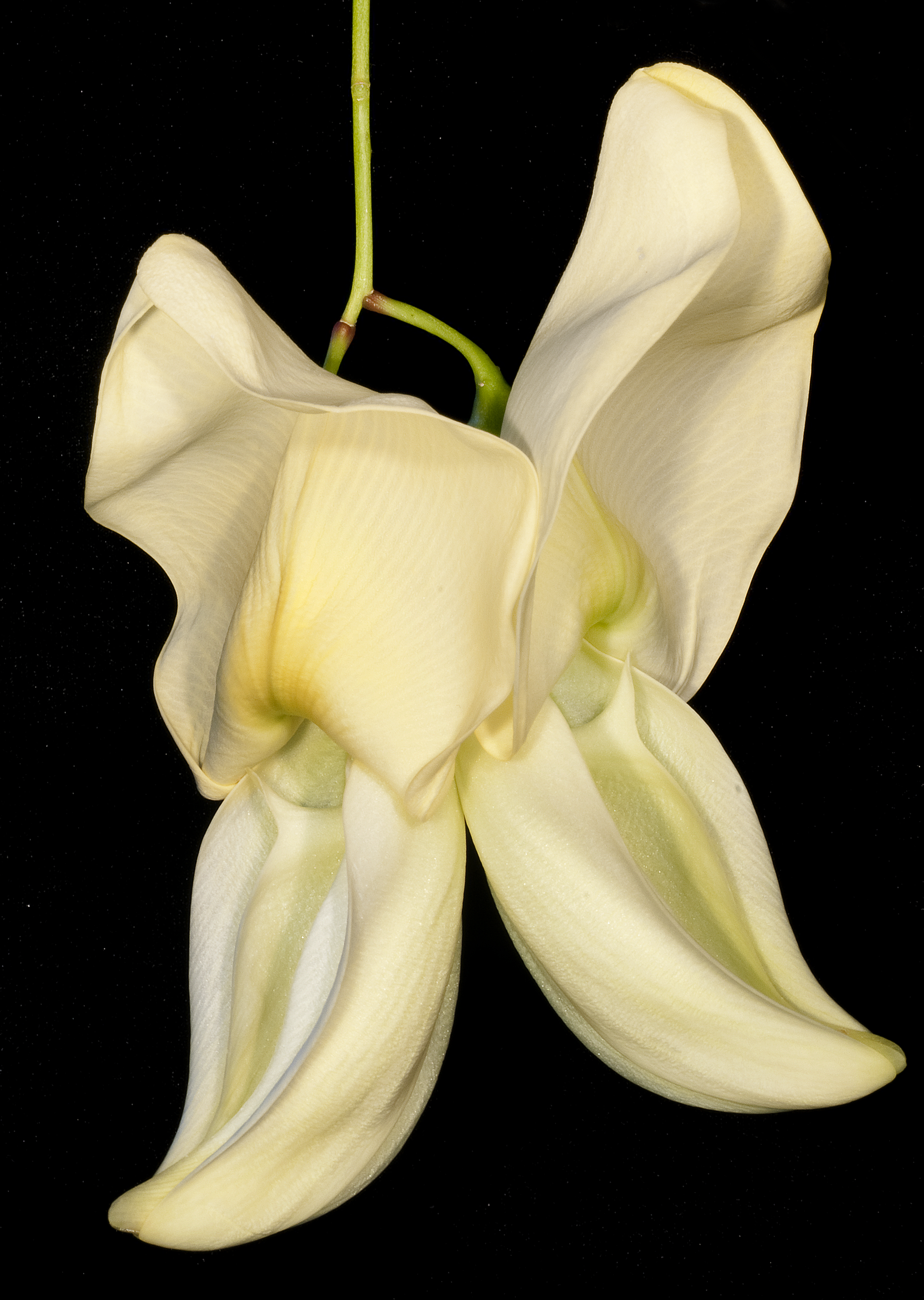

Conservation status
- Least Concern (IUCN 3.1)

Scientific classification
- Kingdom: Plantae
- Clade: Embryophytes
- Clade: Tracheophytes
- Clade: Spermatophytes
- Clade: Angiosperms
- Clade: Eudicots
- Clade: Rosids
- Order: Fabales
- Family: Fabaceae
- Subfamily: Faboideae
- Clade: Robinioids
- Tribe: Sesbanieae
- Genus: Sesbania
- Species: S. formosa

Binomial name
- Sesbania formosa (F.Muell.) N.T.Burb.

Synonyms
- Agati formosum F.Muell.

= Sesbania formosa =

Species of legume

Sesbania formosa (common names - White dragon tree, Vegetable humming bird, Swamp corkwood; Dragon tree; Dragon flower tree) is a leguminous tree native to northern Australia, first described in 1860 by Ferdinand von Mueller as Agati formosum, from specimens collected the banks of the Victoria and Fitzmaurice Rivers. It was transferred to the genus Sesbania, by Nancy Burbidge in 1965.

It is native to Western Australia and the Northern Territory, and grows in tropical wetlands, to heights of 20 to 30 feet, in closed forests or swampy sites, from sea level to 100 m.

== Gallery ==
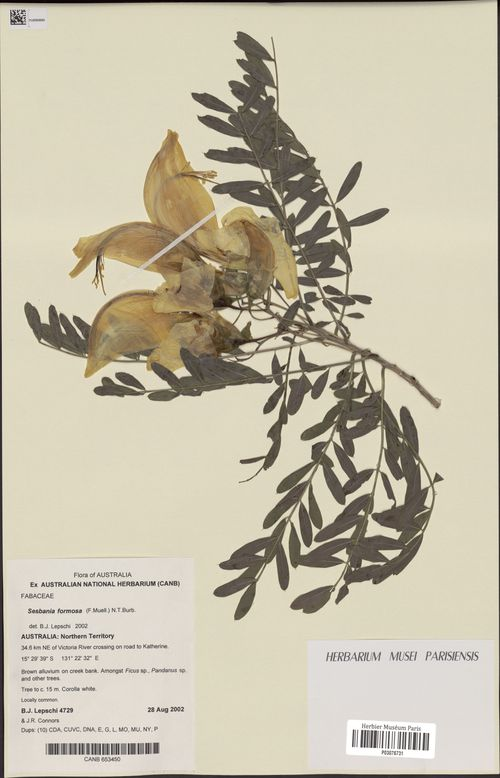
MNHN: P03076731 collected at 15.49416667°S 131.3755555°E

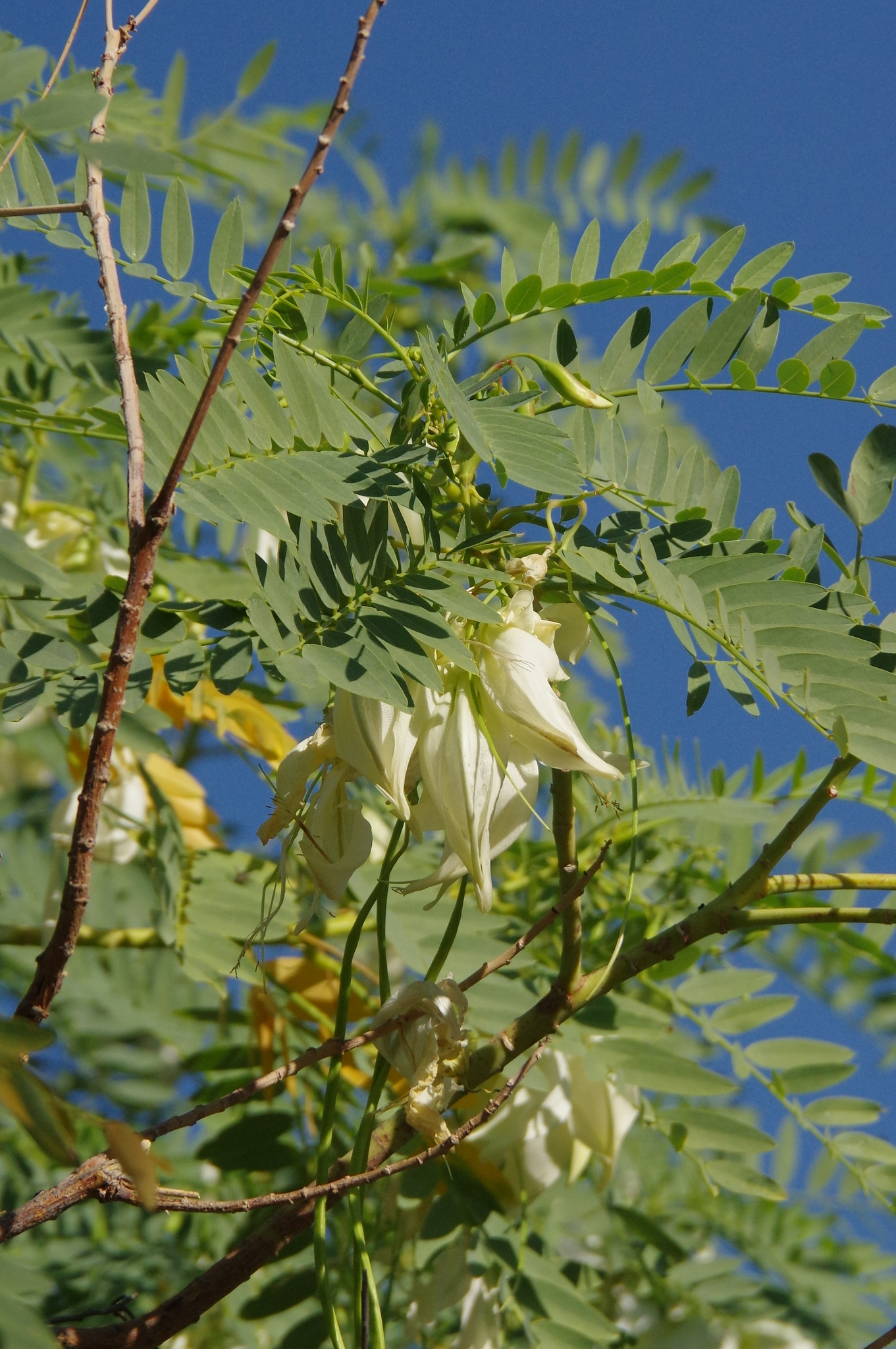
