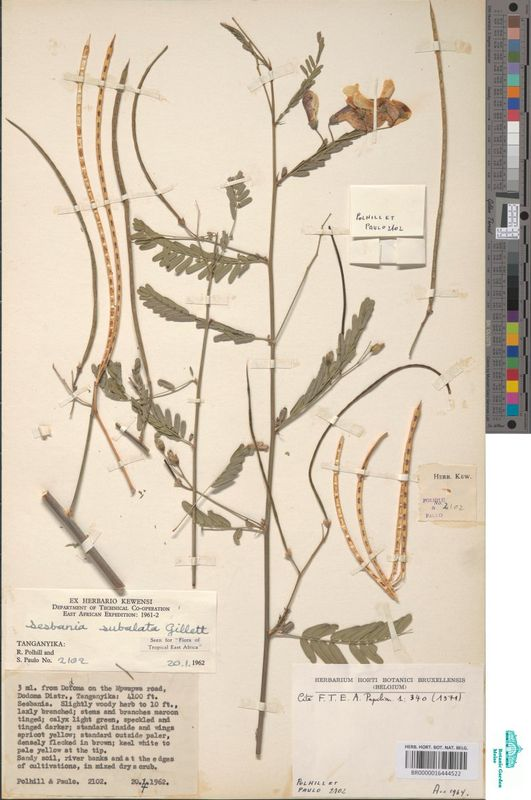

Scientific classification
- Kingdom: Plantae
- Clade: Tracheophytes
- Clade: Angiosperms
- Clade: Eudicots
- Clade: Rosids
- Order: Fabales
- Family: Fabaceae
- Subfamily: Faboideae
- Genus: Sesbania
- Species: S. subalata

Binomial name
- Sesbania subalata J.B.Gillett

= Sesbania subalata =

Species of flowering plant

Sesbania subalata is a species of flowering plant in the family Fabaceae. It is a herb that grows up to 3 metres (120 in) high. The inflorescence has three to nine flowers, and the fruit is a pod.

Sesbania subalata is native to Tanzania, and was described in 1963.

== Taxonomy ==
The species was described by Jan Bevington Gillett in 1963.

== Distribution ==
Sesbania subalata is native to the seasonally dry tropical biome of Tanzania.

The species grows on sandy river-banks, in mixed dry scrub, or on red sandy soil near streams. It is present at elevations of 1,050–1,230 metres (3,440–4,040 ft).

== Description ==
Sesbania subalata is a herb that grows up to 3 metres (120 in) high. The stems are smooth, and may be tinged maroon or purplish-grey. The plant has up to thirty pairs of leaflets. The leaflets are up to 22 millimetres (0.87 in) long, and up to 6 millimetres (0.24 in) wide.

The inflorescence is a raceme with three to nine flowers. The flower stems are up to 18 millimetres (0.71 in) long. The receptacle is around 1.5 millimetres (0.059 in) long. The calyx tube is around 3.5 millimetres (0.14 in) long.

The fruit is a pod that grows up to 23 centimetres (9.1 in) long, and 2.5–3 millimetres (0.098–0.118 in) wide. The pod has twenty-five to forty seeds, which are olive-green, suboblong, and around 4 millimetres (0.16 in) long.

Sesbania subalata may be confused with Sesbania quadrata, though the species differ in the details of their flowers and pods.
