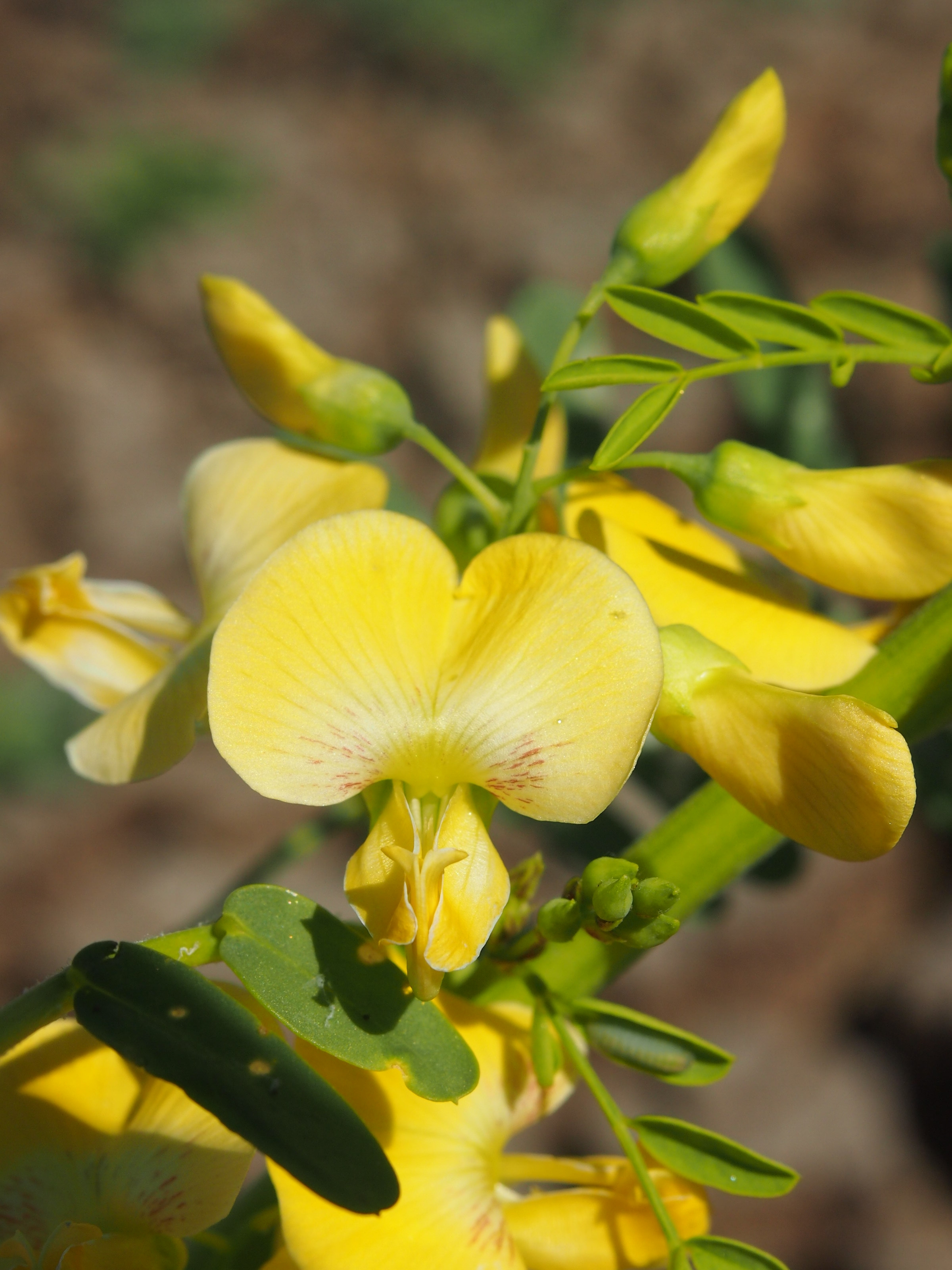
- Close-up of inflorescence
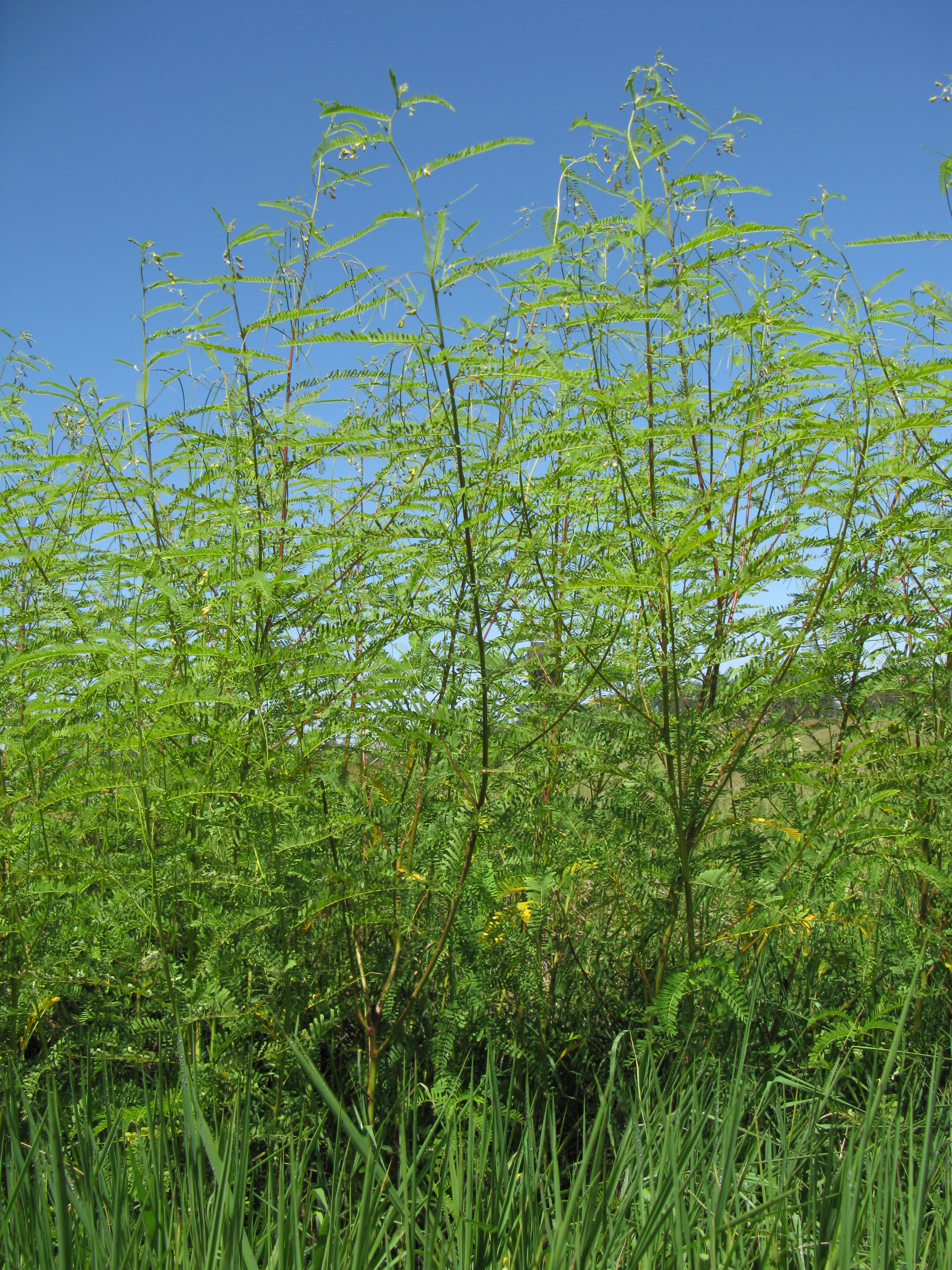
- Habit

Conservation status
- Least Concern (IUCN 3.1)

Scientific classification
- Kingdom: Plantae
- Clade: Embryophytes
- Clade: Tracheophytes
- Clade: Angiosperms
- Clade: Eudicots
- Clade: Rosids
- Order: Fabales
- Family: Fabaceae
- Subfamily: Faboideae
- Genus: Sesbania
- Species: S. cannabina

Binomial name
- Sesbania cannabina (Retz.) Poir.

Synonyms
- List: Aeschynomene cannabina Retz.; Coronilla cannabina (Retz.) Willd.; Coronilla cochinchinensis Lour.; Sesbania aculeata var. cannabina (Retz.) Baker; Sesbania aculeata var. sericea Benth.; Sesbania australis F.Muell.; Sesbania cochinchinensis (Lour.) DC.; Sesbania polyphylla Miq.; Sesbania sericea var. glabra Domin; Sesbania sericea var. inermis Domin; Sesbania sericea var. subsinguliflora Domin

= Sesbania cannabina =

Species of plant

Sesbania cannabina, the sesbania pea, prickly sesban, yellow bush pea, or yellow pea bush, is a widespread species of flowering plant in the family Fabaceae. It is native to the seasonally dry tropics of the Indian Subcontinent, Indochina, and Australia, and it has been introduced to a number of locales around the world. A shrub reaching 1 to 3.5 m (3 to 11 ft), it is typically found in wet areas and poor-draining soils at elevations from 0 to 900 m (0 to 3,000 ft), and can be a weed of rice paddies. It is cultivated as a green manure, and for fodder, erosion control, and its fiber, and is tolerant of alkaline and saline soils. It has been assessed as Least Concern.

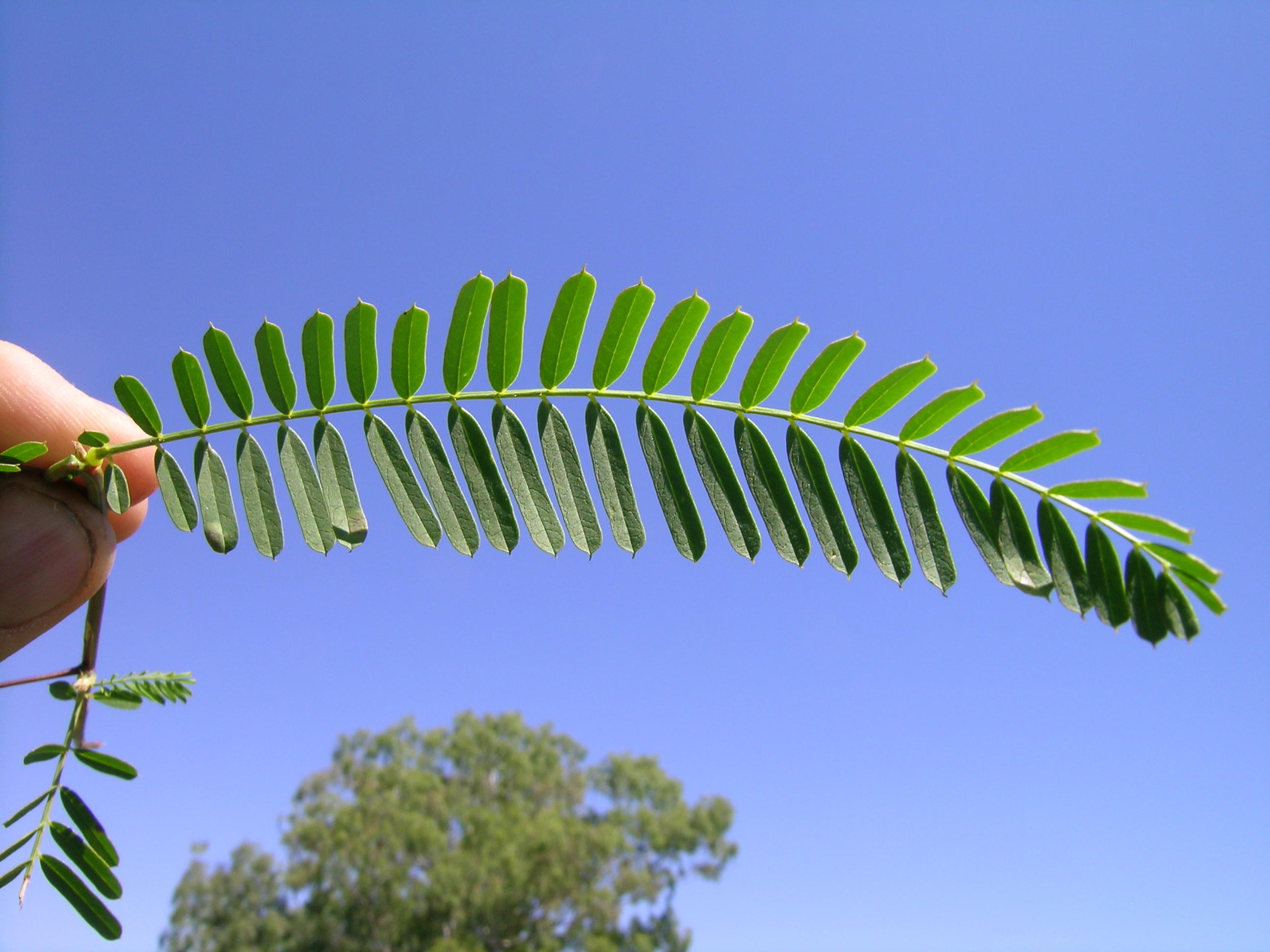
Leaf

== Subtaxa ==
The following varieties are accepted:

- Sesbania cannabina var. cannabina – entire range
- Sesbania cannabina var. sericea (Benth.) N.T.Burb. – Northern Territory
