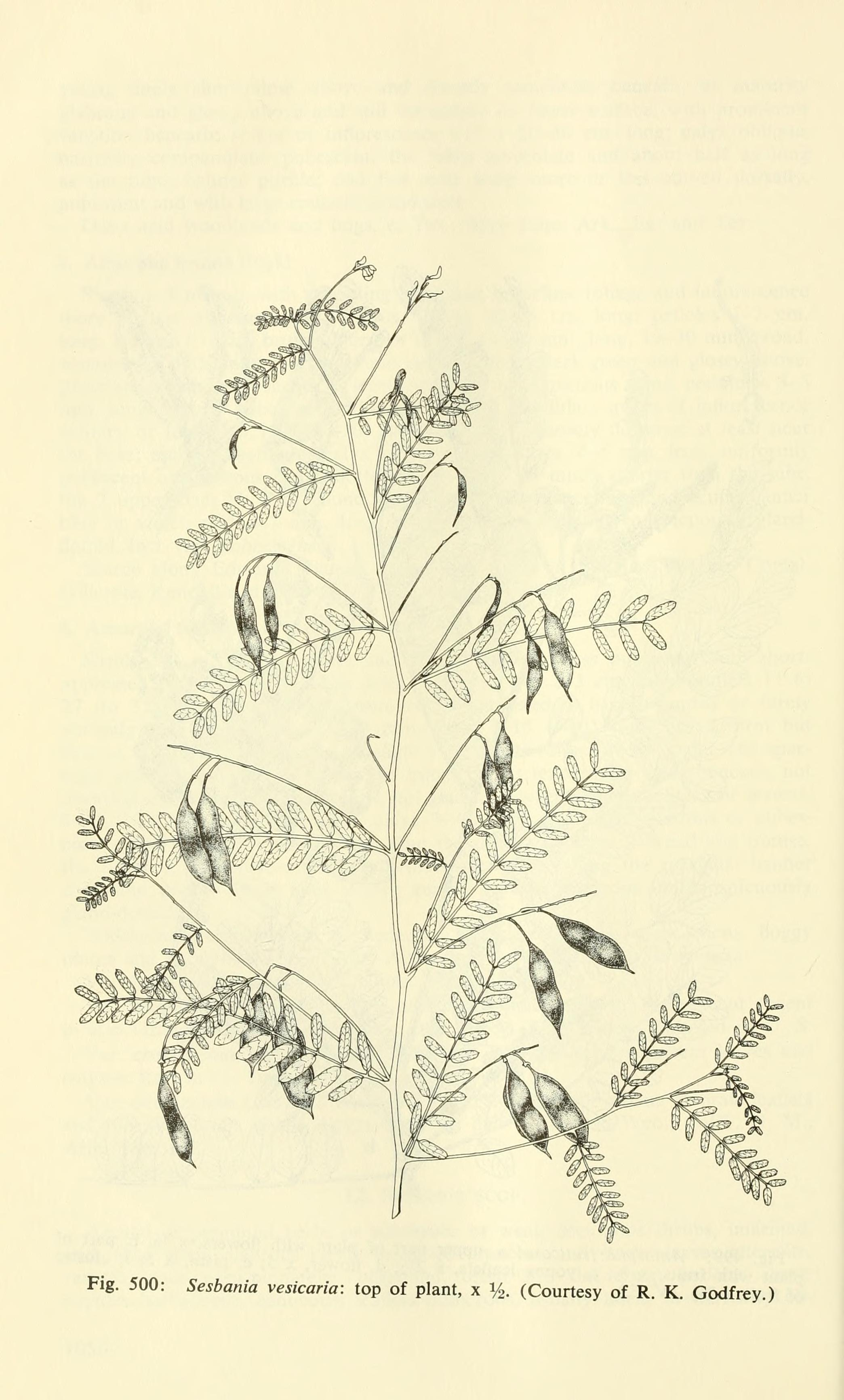

Scientific classification
- Kingdom: Plantae
- Clade: Tracheophytes
- Clade: Angiosperms
- Clade: Eudicots
- Clade: Rosids
- Order: Fabales
- Family: Fabaceae
- Subfamily: Faboideae
- Genus: Sesbania
- Species: S. vesicaria

Binomial name
- Sesbania vesicaria (Jacq.) Elliott

= Sesbania vesicaria =

Species of legume

Sesbania vesicaria, commonly known as the bagpod or bladder pod, is a plant in the family Fabaceae native to North America. This species is a facultative hydrophyte occurring in wetlands and non-wetland areas. It is one of the 60 identified species in the genus Sesbania. The species name vesicaria is derived from the Latin word vesica, -ae meaning bladder or balloon.

Sesbania vesicaria is a tall, annual herb with a single main stem, 4 to 8 feet tall. This plant species is identified as being a shrub with pinnately compound leaves.

== Description ==
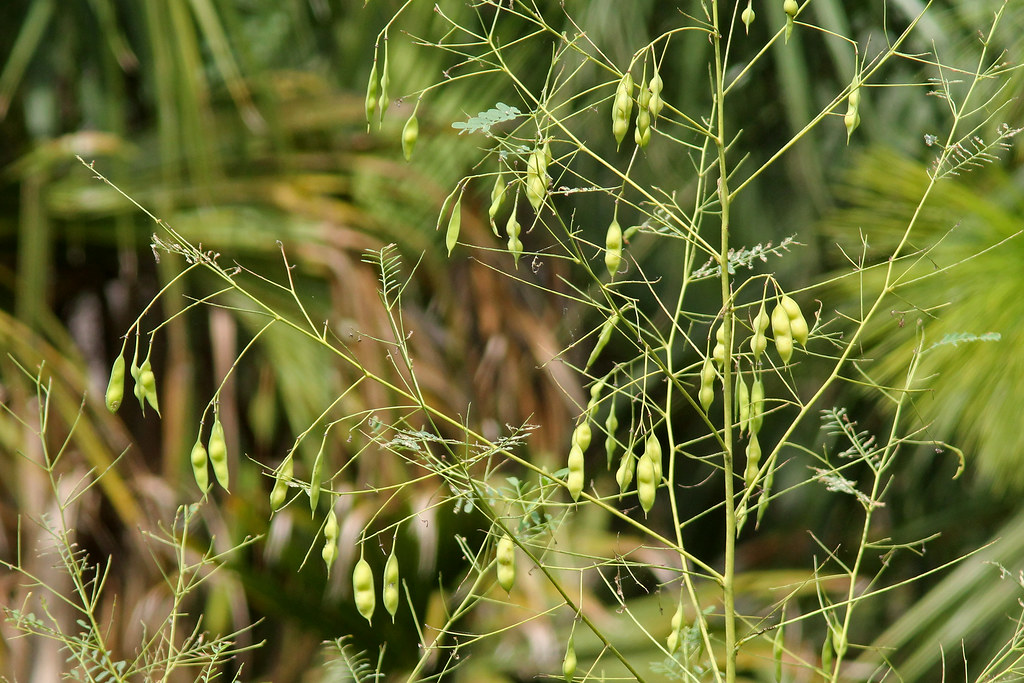
Photograph of Sesbania vesicaria with bladder pods.

Sesbania vesicaria has a tall single stem that is 4 to 8 feet tall. Seeds of Sesbania vesicaria are bean-like, nearly oblong in outline, about 1 centimeter long and 5 millimeters wide. In color, these seeds are green and yellowish in their juvenile stage and mature to a dark brown. The bag pod flowers are predominately yellow, with hints of pink or red. The leaves are evenly pinnately compound. 20 to 40 leaflet are present per leaf, they are oblong to elliptical in nature. The seed pods of Sesbania vesicaria are strongly beaked containing 1 to 3 seeds in each pod, 2 being the most prominent in nature.

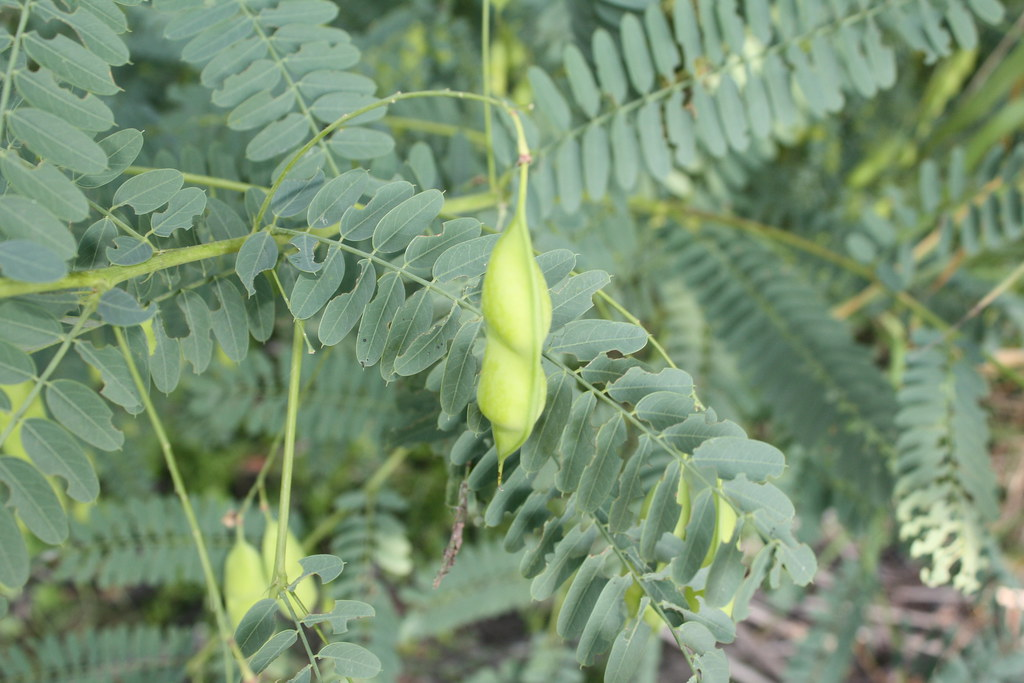
The bladder pods of Sesbania vesicaria.

== Fossil record ==
Fossil seed pods found in the upper Oligocene resembles the Sesbania seed pods. The fossil species grew in a swampy and riparian environment.

== Distribution and habitat ==
Sesbania vesicaria is restricted to a freshwater habitat where salinities approach 0 ppt and is most commonly found on mineral soils in wet pastures, disturbed areas, commonly present in abandoned rice fields. Sesbania vesicaria generally will grow as scattered individual plants but will sometimes form dense colonies. Sesbania vesicaria has been identified in 10 different states throughout the United States: Alabama, Arkansas, Florida, Georgia, Louisiana, Mississippi, North Carolina, Oklahoma, South Carolina, and Texas. In the Atlantic and Gulf Coastal Plain, Eastern Mountains and Piedmont, and Great plains, this species will be present as a facultative hydrophyte where this species occurs in wetland and non-wetland areas. In the Midwest this species is identified as an obligate hydrophyte because it will almost always occur in wetland areas.

== Uses and propagation ==
Bag pod flowers are easily propagated by planting seeds on prepared seed beds or lightly disturbed, wet mineral soils. Once emerged, the seedlings prosper under very wet soil conditions but have a surprising tolerance for dry soils. Sesbania vesicaria can tolerate fire, freshwater flooding, drought, and prospers under heavy livestock grazing after cultivation. The best control of Sesbania vesicaria is frequent mowing or application of herbicides licensed for use on aquatic plants. It is blamed for one death in South Carolina in Late October 2021. A hiker ate some pods and died after three days in the hospital.
