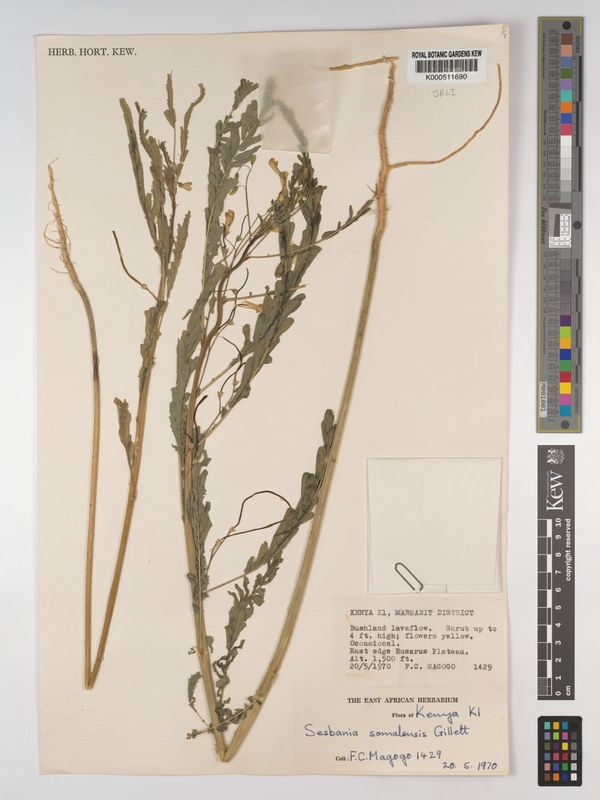

Conservation status
- Least Concern (IUCN 3.1)

Scientific classification
- Kingdom: Plantae
- Clade: Embryophytes
- Clade: Tracheophytes
- Clade: Angiosperms
- Clade: Eudicots
- Clade: Rosids
- Order: Fabales
- Family: Fabaceae
- Subfamily: Faboideae
- Genus: Sesbania
- Species: S. somalensis

Binomial name
- Sesbania somalensis J.B.Gillett

= Sesbania somalensis =

Species of flowering plant

Sesbania somalensis is a species of flowering plant in the family Fabaceae. It is a semi-woody herb with oblong leaflets, and three to six flowered inflorescences. The fruits are pods. The species is native to Ethiopia, Kenya, and Somalia.

Sesbania somalensis was described in 1963, and is listed as of Least Concern by the IUCN.

== Taxonomy ==
The species was described by Jan Bevington Gillett in 1963.

== Distribution ==
Sesbania somalensis is native to the seasonally dry tropical biome of Ethiopia, Kenya, and Somalia. It occurs on the Haud.

It grows near rocky water courses, on red soil and sun-baked mud, in dry scrubland dominated by Acacia and Commiphora. The species is present at elevations of 300–1,300 metres (980–4,270 ft).

== Description ==
Sesbania somalensis is a semi-woody herb that grows 0.5–1.5 metres (1.6–4.9 ft) high.

The plant has oblong leaflets, which are up to 13 millimetres (0.51 in) long, and up to 4.5 millimetres (0.18 in). The leaflets are in seven to fifteen pairs.

The inflorescences are racemes with three to six flowers. The flowers have 6–10 millimetres (0.24–0.39 in) stems. The calyx has a 1.5 millimetres (0.059 in) long receptacle, and a 3.5 millimetres (0.14 in) long tube. The standard is elliptical, 12–18 millimetres (0.47–0.71 in) long, and 12–19 millimetres (0.47–0.75 in) wide. The claw is 4–5 millimetres (0.16–0.20 in) long.

The fruit is a pod, measuring 8–14 centimetres (3.1–5.5 in) long, and around 2.5 millimetres (0.098 in) wide. The pod has eight to twenty-five seeds, which are around 4 millimetres (0.16 in) long, and 1.8 millimetres (0.071 in) wide.

Sesbania somalensis is sometimes confused with Sesbania bispinosa.

== Conservation ==
In 2010, the IUCN assessed Sesbania somalensis as of Least Concern. The population is thought to be stable, and faces no known threats.

== Nomenclature ==
In the Somali language, the species is known as Leboi Yer, meaning "little Lebi." The name is also used for other species of Sesbania.
