= Sesbania simpliciuscula =

Scientific classification
- Kingdom: Plantae
- Clade: Tracheophytes
- Clade: Angiosperms
- Clade: Eudicots
- Clade: Rosids
- Order: Fabales
- Family: Fabaceae
- Subfamily: Faboideae
- Genus: Sesbania
- Species: S. simpliciuscula

Binomial name
- Sesbania simpliciuscula F.Muell. ex Benth.

Varieties
- Sesbania simpliciuscula var. fitzroyensis N.T.Burb.; Sesbania simpliciuscula var. simpliciuscula

Synonyms
- Emerus simpliciusculus (F.Muell. ex Benth.) Kuntze

Species of flowering plant

Sesbania simpliciuscula is a species of flowering plant in the family Fabaceae. It is a herb or shrub with yellow flowers. The species is native to Western Australia, and was first validly described in 1864.

== Taxonomy ==
The name Sesbania simpliciuscula was first validly published by George Bentham in 1864, following an invalid publication by Ferdinand von Mueller.

Two varieties are recognised:

- Sesbania simpliciuscula var. fitzroyensis N.T.Burb.
- Sesbania simpliciuscula var. simpliciuscula

== Distribution ==
Sesbania simpliciuscula is native to the deserts and dry shrublands of Western Australia.

== Description ==
Sesbania simpliciuscula is a herb or shrub that grows up to 5 metres (16 ft) high. The plant has narrowly oblong leaflets, which are 7–35 millimetres (0.28–1.38 in) long, and 2–5.5 millimetres (0.079–0.217 in) wide. The leaflets are arranged into ten to thirty-five pairs.

The inflorescence is a raceme with six to sixteen flowers. The flower stems are 3–15 millimetres (0.12–0.59 in) long. The calyx is 4.5–9 millimetres (0.18–0.35 in) long. The corolla is yellow, and often has red flecks. The standard, wings, and keel are 12–22 millimetres (0.47–0.87 in) long. The plant flowers from January to October.

The fruit is a pod measuring 8–23 centimetres (3.1–9.1 in) long, and 3–5 millimetres (0.12–0.20 in) wide. The seeds are around 4 millimetres (0.16 in) long, and around 2 millimetres (0.079 in) wide. The plant fruits in October, and from March to July.
