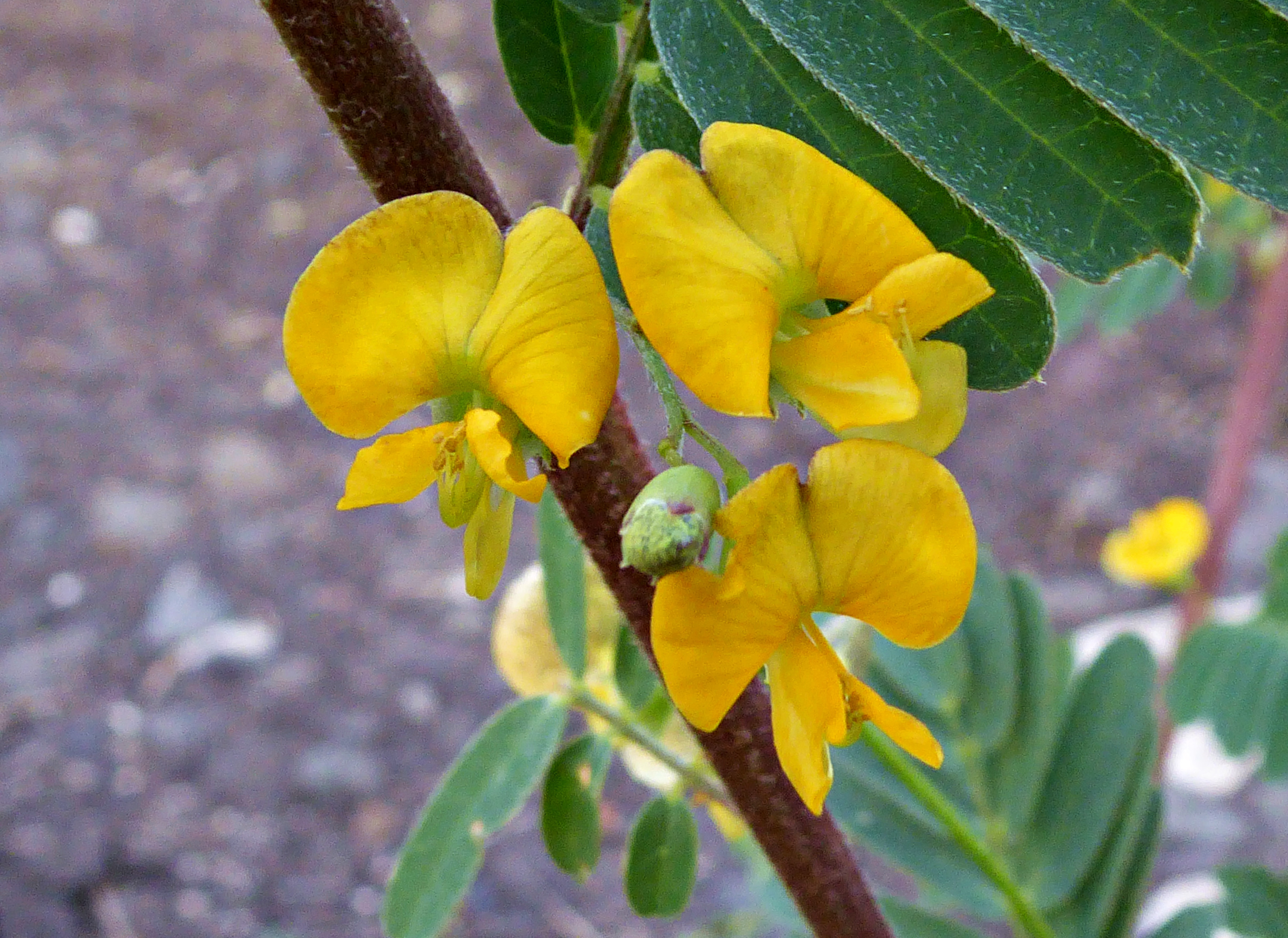

Conservation status
- Least Concern (IUCN 3.1)

Scientific classification
- Kingdom: Plantae
- Clade: Tracheophytes
- Clade: Angiosperms
- Clade: Eudicots
- Clade: Rosids
- Order: Fabales
- Family: Fabaceae
- Subfamily: Faboideae
- Genus: Sesbania
- Species: S. sericea

Binomial name
- Sesbania sericea (Willd.) Link

Synonyms
- Agati sericea (Willd.) Hitchc.; Coronilla sericea Willd.; Aeschynomene pubescens Vahl ex DC.; Coronilla pubescens Schumach. & Thonn.; Emerus pubescens (DC.) Schumach. & Thonn.; Sesbania laevigata Afr.Fern. & E.P.Nunes; Sesbania pubescens DC.

= Sesbania sericea =

Species of flowering plant

Sesbania sericea is a species of flowering plant in the family Fabaceae. It is a herb or subshrub with yellow flowers and dehiscent fruits. The species is native to Africa and the Arabian Peninsula.

Sesbania sericea was described in 1809, and is listed as of Least Concern by the IUCN.

== Taxonomy ==
The species was described by Carl Ludwig Willdenow in 1809, and placed in the genus Coronilla In 1822, Johann Heinrich Friedrich Link moved it to the genus Sesbania.

== Distribution ==
Sesbania sericea is native to Africa (Angola, Benin, Burundi, Chad, Republic of the Congo, Democratic Republic of the Congo, Ethiopia, Gabon, Ghana, islands in the Gulf of Guinea, Ivory Coast, Kenya, Malawi, Mali, Mauritania, Niger, Nigeria, Senegal, Somalia, Sudan, South Sudan, Tanzania, Togo, and Uganda) and the Arabian Peninsula (Oman, Saudi Arabia, and Yemen).

It has been introduced to the Bahamas, Belize, north-east Brazil, Cambodia, Colombia, Cuba, Egypt, French Guiana, Guatemala, Guyana, Hispaniola, India, Jamaica, Java, Laos, the Leeward Islands, Myanmar, Puerto Rico, Réunion, the Seychelles, Sri Lanka, Suriname, Thailand, Trinidad and Tobago, Venezuela, (including the Venezuelan Antilles), Vietnam, the Windward Islands, and the United States (Florida and Texas).

The species grows at elevations of up to 850 metres (2,790 ft), in old rice fields, moist and temporarily flooded areas, river banks, lagoon sides, and lakes. It is often found near Typha.

== Description ==
Sesbania sericea is an annual or perennial herb or subshrub. It grows 1–3 metres (3.3–9.8 ft) tall. The stems have a reddish tinge.

The leaves are 5–12 centimetres (2.0–4.7 in) long, and have five to fifteen pairs of leaflets. The leaflets are oblong to elliptical, papery, 1–2.5 centimetres (0.39–0.98 in) long, and 0.3–0.8 centimetres (0.12–0.31 in) wide.

The inflorescence is a raceme that grows up to 6 centimetres (2.4 in) long. The calyx is broadly bell-shaped, and 3–5 millimetres (0.12–0.20 in) long. The corolla is yellow. The standard is widely ovate, and up to 12 millimetres (0.47 in) long. The wings and keel are the same length as the standard.

The fruit is a dehiscent, slightly curved, 12–16 centimetres (4.7–6.3 in) long, 2.5–3 millimetres (0.098–0.118 in) wide legume. The seeds are cylindrical, light brown, and around 3 millimetres (0.12 in) long.

== Uses ==
Sesbania sericea is used for animal food, medicine, and for fuel. It is used to poison fish.

== Ecology ==
Sesbania sericea is eaten by Somena scintillans.

== Conservation ==
In 2019, the IUCN assessed Sesbania sericea as of Least Concern. The species faces no major threats.

== Nomenclature ==
In English, Sesbania sericea is commonly known as "Silky sesban" or "papagayo".
