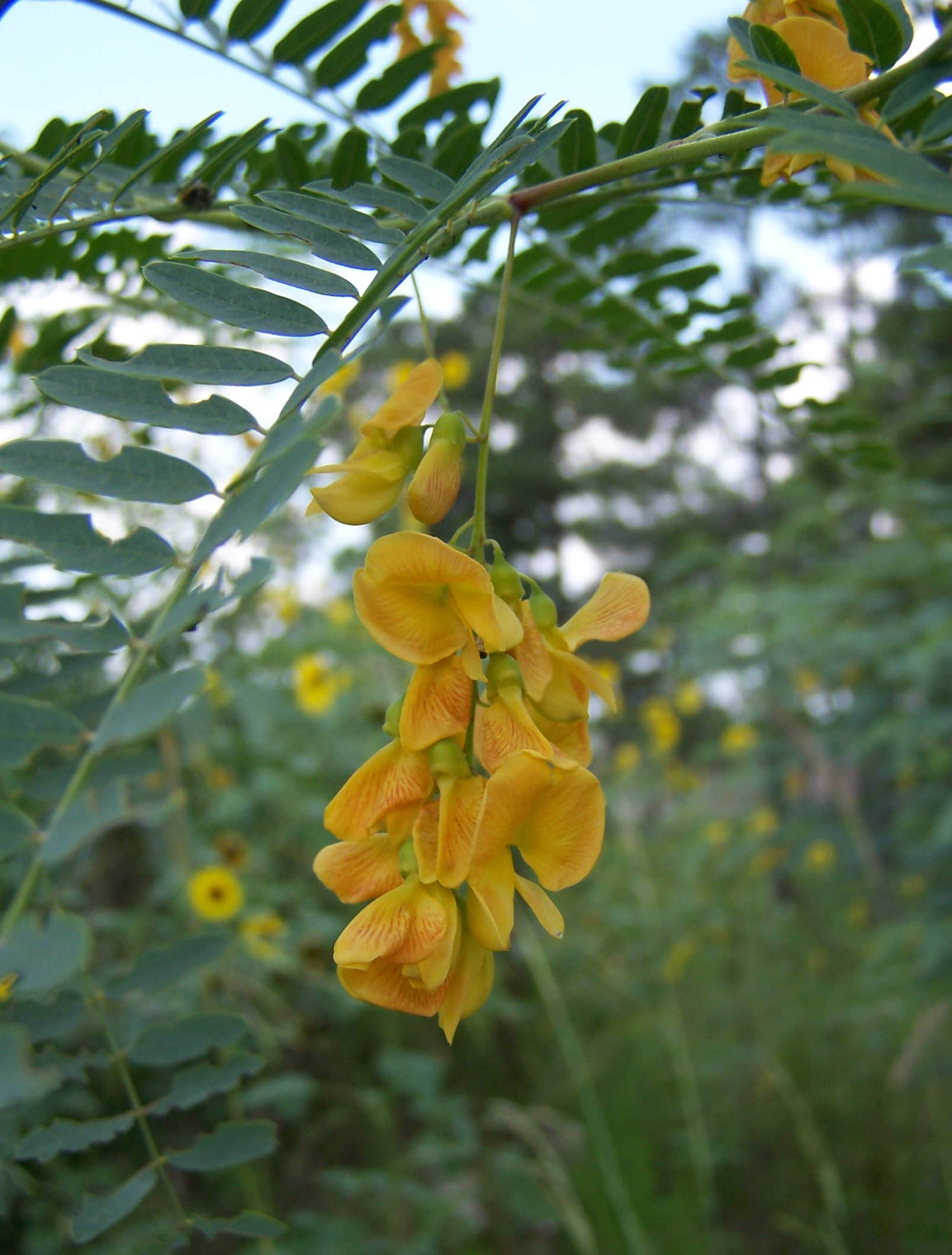
- Sesbania drummondii inflorescence

Scientific classification
- Kingdom: Plantae
- Clade: Tracheophytes
- Clade: Angiosperms
- Clade: Eudicots
- Clade: Rosids
- Order: Fabales
- Family: Fabaceae
- Subfamily: Faboideae
- Clade: Robinioids
- Tribe: Sesbanieae
- Genus: Sesbania
- Species: S. drummondii

Binomial name
- Sesbania drummondii (Rydb.) Cory

= Sesbania drummondii =

Species of legume

Sesbania drummondii, known as poisonbean, rattlebox and rattlebush, is a medium-sized perennial shrub in the legume family Fabaceae. It is native to the southeastern United States, from Texas east to Florida.

These woody-based shrubs grow from 1–3 metres (3.3–9.8 ft) tall. It is usually much branched in the upper portion. Branches are thin and widely spreading. The medium green leaves are alternate, deciduous, and pinnately compound. There are typically 12-24 leaflets, and occasionally as many as 60 are found. Each leaflet is oblong shaped and 2–3 centimetres (0.79–1.18 in) long. The orange-yellow, pea-like flowers occur in a drooping raceme on a long stem. They are often found with red lining. The seed pods are four-sided, four-winged, and about 10 centimetres (3.9 in) long. The peas rattle inside, giving this plant its common name of Rattlebush. Inside the pods, the seeds are separated by transverse partitions.

These plants flower from May to October, usually retaining many of the seed pods, which remain attached until the plant dies back to ground level for the winter.

This plant prefers moist soils of ditches and frequently-inundated meadows, as well as depressions and the open edges of lakes, ponds and streams.

The seeds are poisonous, containing the toxin sesbanimide. Animals raised with the plant learn to avoid it because of the foul taste of the green and flowering plants. However, naive cattle, goats or sheep placed on pastures containing dried plants in late fall and winter are frequently poisoned. Sick animals often die within 24 hours.

This species is named in honor of the Scottish-born naturalist Thomas Drummond (1793-1835). Other common names include sennabean and Drummond sesbania.
