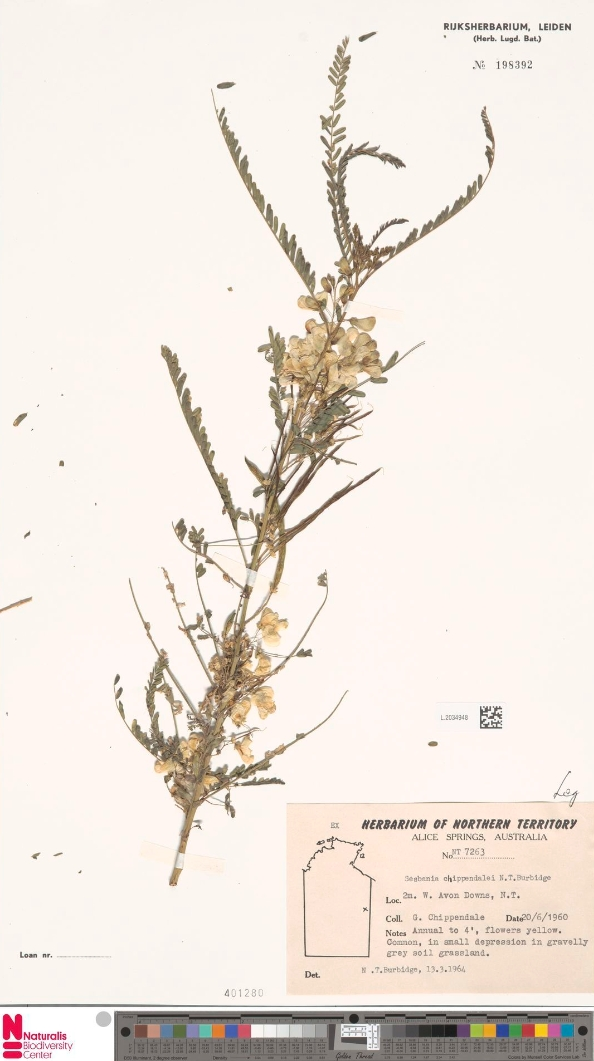

Scientific classification
- Kingdom: Plantae
- Clade: Embryophytes
- Clade: Tracheophytes
- Clade: Spermatophytes
- Clade: Angiosperms
- Clade: Eudicots
- Clade: Rosids
- Order: Fabales
- Family: Fabaceae
- Subfamily: Faboideae
- Genus: Sesbania
- Species: S. chippendalei

Binomial name
- Sesbania chippendalei N.T.Burb.

= Sesbania chippendalei =

Species of flowering plant

Sesbania chippendalei, commonly known as the yellow pea-bush, is a species of flowering plant in the family Fabaceae. The species is native to Australia, and was described in 1965.

Sesbania chippendalei is an annual plant, with yellow flowers and light brown seeds.

== Taxonomy ==
Sesbania chippendalei was described by Nancy Tyson Burbidge in 1965. The holotype specimen was collected 36 miles (58 km) west of Camooweal.

== Distribution ==
Sesbania chippendalei is native to the seasonally dry tropical biome of Australia. It is present in the Northern Territory and Queensland.

== Description ==
Sesbania chippendalei is an annual plant, that grows up to 1.5 metres (4.9 ft) high. The young shoots have closely pressed hairs.

The plant has an even number of leaves, which are 7–18 centimetres (2.8–7.1 in) long. It has twelve to forty pairs of leaflets, which are oblong, and 9–15 millimetres (0.35–0.59 in) long.

The rachis has six to ten flowers, which grow on slender stems. The stems are 5–10 millimetres (0.20–0.39 in) long. The calyx is 4–5 millimetres (0.16–0.20 in) long, and cup or bell-shaped. The corolla is pale yellow, and has a 12–15 millimetres (0.47–0.59 in) long standard (posterior petal).

The fruits are pods, which are 5–10 centimetres (2.0–3.9 in) long, and around 4 millimetres (0.16 in) wide. The seeds are light brown, oblong, and around 5 millimetres (0.20 in) long. The species is in flower and fruit for most of the year.

== Nomenclature ==
In the Malak-Malak language, the species is known as Wiliya. In the Matngala language, the species was known as Kulitya.
