= Sesbania tetraptera =

Scientific classification
- Kingdom: Plantae
- Clade: Tracheophytes
- Clade: Angiosperms
- Clade: Eudicots
- Clade: Rosids
- Order: Fabales
- Family: Fabaceae
- Subfamily: Faboideae
- Genus: Sesbania
- Species: S. tetraptera

Binomial name
- Sesbania tetraptera Hochst. ex Baker

Subspecies
- Sesbania tetraptera subsp. rogersii (E.Phillips & Hutch.) G.P.Lewis; Sesbania tetraptera subsp. tetraptera

Synonyms
- Emerus tetrapterus (Hochst. ex Baker) Kuntze

Species of flowering plant

Sesbania tetraptera is a species of flowering plant in the family Fabaceae. It is a herb with yellow flowers. The fruits are pods. The species is native to Africa, and was first validly described in 1871.

== Taxonomy ==
The name Sesbania tetraptera was first validly published by John Gilbert Baker in 1871, following an earlier invalid publication by Christian Ferdinand Friedrich Hochstetter.

Two subspecies are recognised:

- Sesbania tetraptera subsp. rogersii (E.Phillips & Hutch.) G.P.Lewis
- Sesbania tetraptera subsp. tetraptera

== Distribution ==
Sesbania tetraptera is native to the seasonally dry tropical biome of Botswana, Chad, Ethiopia, Malawi, Mozambique, Niger, South Africa (the Northern Provinces), Sudan, South Sudan, Tanzania, Zambia, and Zimbabwe. The species grows in temporarily flooded grasslands and Colophospermum woodlands, and on clay, sand, and limestone. It is present at altitudes of 60–1,600 metres (200–5,250 ft).

== Description ==
Sesbania tetraptera is an annual or biennial herb that grows 1–4 metres (3.3–13.1 ft) high. The branches are cylindrical, and sometimes have prickles. The leaflets are up to 2.4 centimetres (0.94 in) long, up to 6 millimetres (0.24 in) wide, and arranged into twenty to thirty pairs.

The inflorescence is a raceme with two to twelve flowers. The calyx tube is around 3 millimetres (0.12 in) long, and has teeth which are around 1.5 millimetres (0.059 in) long. The standard is pale yellow, 7–10 millimetres (0.28–0.39 in) long, and 9–13 millimetres (0.35–0.51 in) wide. The claw is around 4 millimetres (0.16 in) long. The keel is pale to greenish-yellow, and 5–6 millimetres (0.20–0.24 in) long.

The fruit is a slightly curved pod, measuring 12–16 centimetres (4.7–6.3 in) long and around 5 millimetres (0.20 in) wide. It has fifteen to twenty seeds. The seeds are rounded or oblong, yellow, around 4.5 millimetres (0.18 in) long, and around 3 millimetres (0.12 in) wide.
