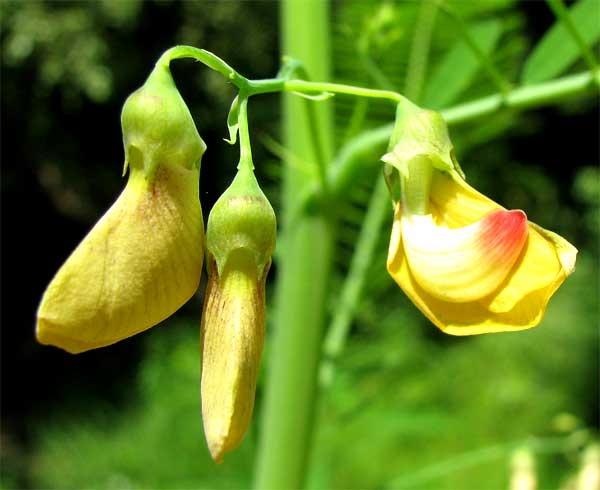

Scientific classification
- Kingdom: Plantae
- Clade: Tracheophytes
- Clade: Angiosperms
- Clade: Eudicots
- Clade: Rosids
- Order: Fabales
- Family: Fabaceae
- Subfamily: Faboideae
- Clade: Robinioids
- Tribe: Sesbanieae
- Genus: Sesbania
- Species: S. herbacea

Binomial name
- Sesbania herbacea (Mill.) McVaugh

Synonyms
- Darwinia exaltata Sesbania exaltata Sesbania macrocarpa

= Sesbania herbacea =

Species of legume

Sesbania herbacea (syn. Sesbania exaltata) is a species of flowering plant in the legume family known by the common names bigpod sesbania, Colorado River-hemp, and coffeeweed. It is native to the United States, particularly the southeastern states, where it grows in moist environments. It can be found elsewhere as an introduced species.

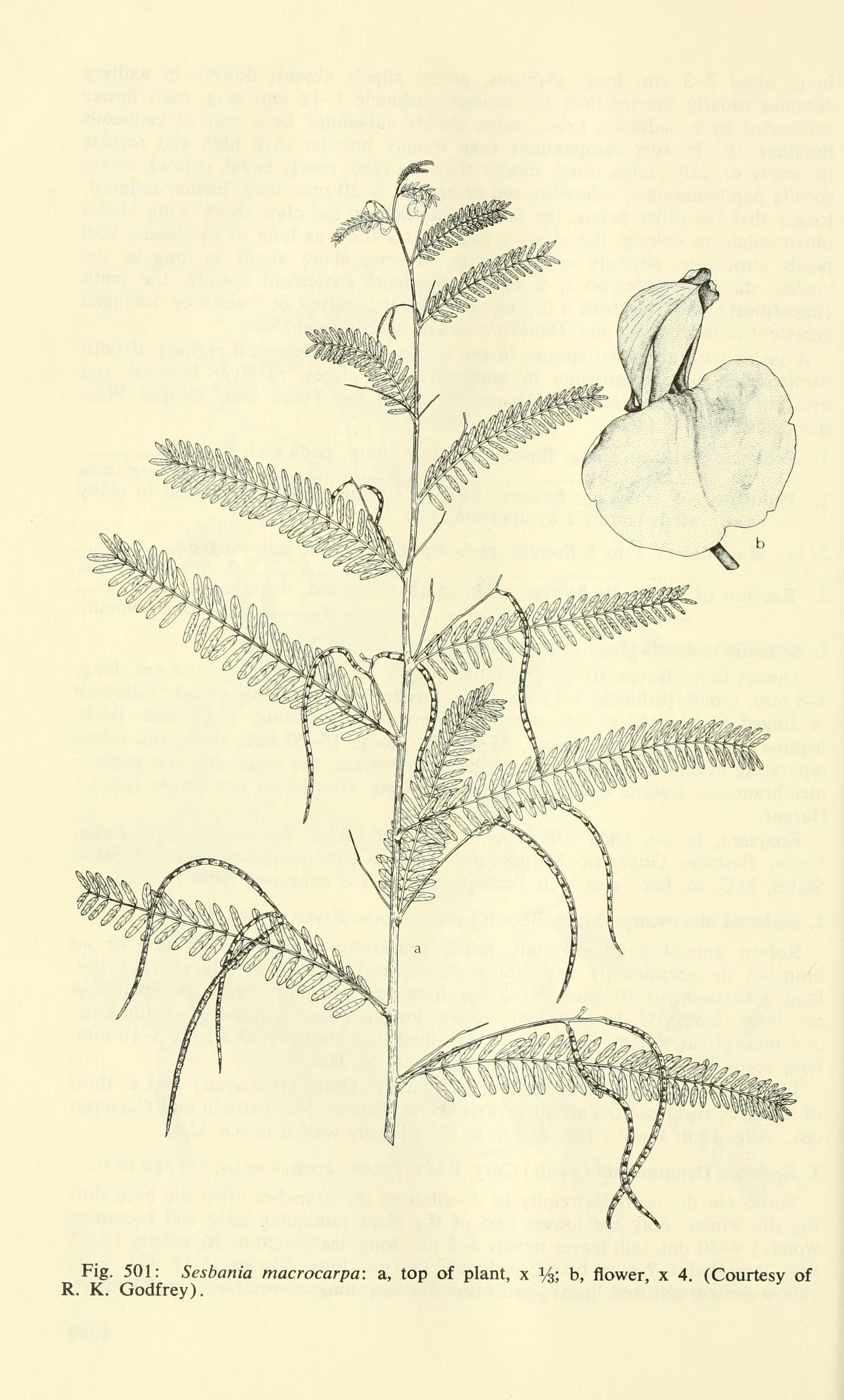

It is a woody herb growing to 3 meters or more in height. The leaves are made up of many pairs of oblong leaflets. The inflorescence is a small raceme of pealike flowers with yellow or purple-spotted petals.
