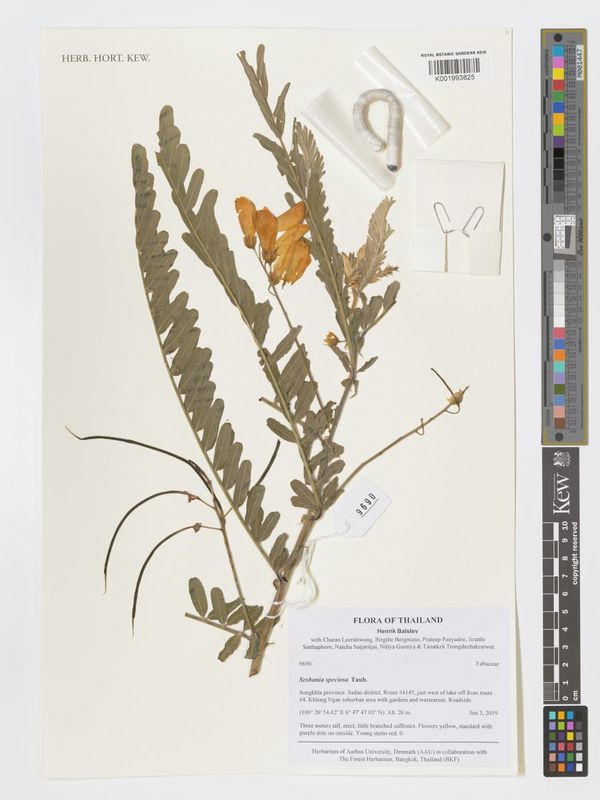

Conservation status
- Vulnerable (IUCN 3.1)

Scientific classification
- Kingdom: Plantae
- Clade: Embryophytes
- Clade: Tracheophytes
- Clade: Angiosperms
- Clade: Eudicots
- Clade: Rosids
- Order: Fabales
- Family: Fabaceae
- Subfamily: Faboideae
- Genus: Sesbania
- Species: S. speciosa

Binomial name
- Sesbania speciosa Taub. ex Engl.

Synonyms
- Sesbania hildebrandtii Taub.; Sesbania pubescens var. grandiflora Vatke; Sesbania speciosa Taub.

= Sesbania speciosa =

Species of flowering plant

Sesbania speciosa is a species of flowering plant in the family Fabaceae. It is a perennial shrub with six to ten flowered inflorescences, and brown, kidney-shaped seeds. The species is native to Africa, and has been introduced to Asia.

Sesbania speciosa was described in 1894, and is listed as Vulnerable by the IUCN.

== Taxonomy ==
The species was described by Adolf Engler in 1894, following an invalid publication by Paul Hermann Wilhelm Taubert.

== Distribution ==
Sesbania speciosa is native to the seasonally dry tropical biome of Kenya, Tanzania, and Mozabique. It has been introduced to India, Papua New Guinea, the Philippines, and Sri Lanka.

The species grows in seasonally flooded grasslands, swamps and ditches, and on river banks, at elevations below 100 metres (330 ft).

== Description ==
Sesbania speciosa is a perennial shrub. It grows 1–3 metres (3.3–9.8 ft) high. The branchlets are obtusely angular.

The leaves are up to 15 centimetres (5.9 in) long. The plant has around fifteen pairs of narrowly oblong leaflets. The leaflets are 2–2.5 centimetres (0.79–0.98 in) long, and 6–8 millimetres (0.24–0.31 in) long.

The inflorescences have six to ten flowers. The flower stems are around 1.5 centimetres (0.59 in) long. The calyx is widely bell-shaped, around 8 millimetres (0.31 in) long, and has five teeth. The teeth are around 1.5 millimetres (0.059 in) long. The vexillum is mottled with purple, broadly elliptical, around 3 centimetres (1.2 in) long, and around 2 centimetres (0.79 in) wide. The keel is around 3 centimetres (1.2 in) long.

The fruit is up to 33 centimetres (13 in) long, and around 8 millimetres (0.31 in) wide. The seeds are dark brown, and roughly kidney-shaped.

== Uses ==
In Asia, Sesbania speciosa is cultivated for green manure, which is mainly used for rice farming.

== Conservation ==
In 2012, the IUCN assessed Sesbania speciosa as Vulnerable. Its habitat is affected by agriculture, including Jatropha and sugar plantations. The species is present in Saadani National Park.
