= Azorhizobium caulinodans =

Scientific classification
- Domain: Bacteria
- Kingdom: Pseudomonadati
- Phylum: Pseudomonadota
- Class: Alphaproteobacteria
- Order: Hyphomicrobiales
- Family: Xanthobacteraceae
- Genus: Azorhizobium
- Species: A. caulinodans

Binomial name
- Azorhizobium caulinodans Dreyfus et al. 1988

Species of bacterium

Azorhizobium caulinodans is a species of gram-negative bacteria from the family Xanthobacteraceae. A. caulinodans forms a nitrogen-fixing symbiosis with plants of the genus Sesbania. The symbiotic relationship between Sesbania rostrata and A. caulinodans lead to nitrogen fixing nodules in S. rostrata. Bacterial chemotaxis plays an important role in establishing this symbiotic relationship.

Azorhizobium caulinodans is a genome and it contains chemotaxis gene clusters that are unique. It has five chemotaxis genes which are: cheW(1), cheW, cheA, cheR, and cheB. Azorhizobium caulinodans controls the movements of flagella, and the chemotaxis signaling path in Azorhizobium caulinodans helps with regulating biofilm formation.

Azorhizobium caulinodans does not typically cause infections in humans. In 2022, a case of bacteremia was reported in a patient with acute myeloid leukemia. Correct identification of A. caulinodans in the clinical setting is challenging. The bacterium may be misidentified as Bordetella bronchiseptica with traditional biochemical methods and the organism is not included in typical MALDI-TOF databases.
