= List of plants of Burkina Faso =

Burkina Faso is a landlocked country in West Africa. Its natural vegetation mainly consists of savannas. In the south, there are also dry forests and gallery forests. The highest diversity of plant species can be found in the humid southwest.

== Species ==
- Abelmoschus esculentus (L.) Moench
- Abelmoschus moschatus Medik.
- Abildgaardia ovata (Burm.f.) Kral
- Abrus canescens Welw. ex Baker
- Abrus melanospermus Hassk.
- Abrus precatorius L.
- Abutilon fruticosum Guill. & Perr.
- Abutilon grandifolium (Willd.) Sweet
- Abutilon indicum (L.) Sweet
- Abutilon pannosum (G.Forst.) Schltdl.
- Abutilon ramosum (Cav.) Guill. & Perr.
- Acacia amythethophylla Steud. ex A.Rich.
- Acacia dudgeoni Holland
- Acacia erythrocalyx Brenan
- Acacia hockii De Wild.
- Acacia holosericea A.Cunn. ex G.Don
- Acalypha ceraceopunctata Pax
- Acalypha ciliata Forssk.
- Acalypha crenata Hochst. ex A.Rich.
- Acalypha hispida Burm.f.
- Acalypha segetalis Müll.Arg.
- Acanthospermum hispidum DC.
- Achyranthes aspera L.
- Acmella caulirhiza Delile
- Acmella uliginosa (Sw.) Cass.
- Acridocarpus chevalieri Sprague
- Acroceras amplectens Stapf
- Acroceras zizanioides (Kunth) Dandy
- Adansonia digitata L.
- Adenanthera pavonina L.
- Adenia cissampeloides (Planch. ex Hook.) Harms
- Adenia lobata (Jacq.) Engl.
- Adenodolichos paniculatus (Hua) Hutch. & Dalziel
- Adenostemma afrum DC.
- Adenostemma viscosum J.R.Forst. & G.Forst.
- Adiantum philippense L.
- Adiantum schweinfurthii Kuhn
- Aedesia glabra (Klatt) O.Hoffm.
- Aeollanthus pubescens Benth.
- Aerva javanica (Burm.f.) Juss. ex Schult.
- Aerva lanata (L.) Juss. ex Schult.
- Aeschynomene afraspera J.Léonard
- Aeschynomene crassicaulis Harms
- Aeschynomene indica L.
- Aeschynomene schimperi A.Rich.
- Aeschynomene sensitiva Sw.
- Aeschynomene tambacoundensis Berhaut
- Afraegle paniculata (Schumach.) Engl.
- Aframomum alboviolaceum (Ridl.) K.Schum.
- Aframomum sceptrum (Oliv. & D.Hanb.) K.Schum.
- Afrotrilepis pilosa (Boeckeler) J.Raynal
- Afzelia africana Sm. ex Pers.
- Agave sisalana Perrine
- Agelanthus dodoneifolius (DC.) Polhill & Wiens
- Ageratum conyzoides L.
- Akeassia grangeoides J.-P.Lebrun & Stork.
- Alafia landolphioides (Thonn.) De Wild.
- Albizia chevalieri Harms
- Albizia dinklagei (Harms) Harms
- Albizia ferruginea (Guill. & Perr.) Benth.
- Albizia lebbeck (L.) Benth.
- Albizia malacophylla (A.Rich.) Walp.
- Albizia zygia (DC.) J.F.Macbr.
- Albuca nigritana (Baker) Troupin
- Alchornea cordifolia (Schumach. & Thonn.) Müll.Arg.
- Alectra vogelii Benth.
- Allamanda cathartica L.
- Allium cepa L.
- Allium sativum L.
- Allophylus africanus P.Beauv.
- Allophylus spicatus (Poir.) Radlk.
- Alloteropsis semialata (R.Br.) Hitchc.
- Aloe buettneri A.Berger
- Aloe macrocarpa Tod.
- Aloe schweinfurthii Baker
- Alstonia congensis Engl.
- Alternanthera nodiflora R.Br.
- Alternanthera pungens Kunth
- Alternanthera sessilis (L.) DC.
- Alysicarpus glumaceus (Vahl) DC.
- Alysicarpus ovalifolius (Schumach.) J.Léonard
- Alysicarpus rugosus (Willd.) DC.
- Alysicarpus zeyheri Harv.
- Amaranthus dubius Mart. ex Thell.
- Amaranthus graecizans L.
- Amaranthus hybridus L.
- Amaranthus spinosus L.
- Amaranthus viridis L.
- Amblygonocarpus andongensis (Welw. ex Oliv.) Exell & Torre
- Ambrosia maritima L.
- Ammannia auriculata Willd.
- Ammannia baccifera L.
- Ammannia gracilis Guill. & Perr.
- Ammannia prieuriana Guill. & Perr.
- Ammannia senegalensis Lam.
- Amorphophallus abyssinicus (A.Rich.) N.E.Br.
- Amorphophallus aphyllus (Hook.) Hutch.
- Amorphophallus baumannii (Engl.) N.E.Br.
- Amorphophallus dracontioides (Engl.) N.E.Br.
- Amorphophallus johnsonii N.E.Br.
- Ampelocissus africana (Lour.) Merr.
- Ampelocissus leonensis (Hook.f.) Planch.
- Ampelocissus multistriata (Baker) Planch.
- Anacardium occidentale L.
- Anadelphia afzeliana (Rendle) Stapf
- Anadelphia leptocoma (Trin.) Pilg.
- Anadelphia trispiculata Stapf
- Anagallis pumila Sw.
- Ananas comosus (L.) Merr.
- Anchomanes difformis (Blume) Engl.
- Ancylobotrys amoena Hua
- Andira inermis (W.Wright) DC.
- Andropogon africanus Franch.
- Andropogon canaliculatus Schumach.
- Andropogon chevalieri Reznik.
- Andropogon chinensis (Nees) Merr.
- Andropogon gayanus Kunth
- Andropogon macrophyllus Stapf
- Andropogon perligulatus Stapf
- Andropogon pinguipes Stapf
- Andropogon pseudapricus Stapf
- Andropogon pteropholis Clayton
- Andropogon schirensis A.Rich.
- Andropogon tectorum Schumach. & Thonn.
- Aneilema lanceolatum Benth.
- Aneilema paludosum A.Chev.
- Aneilema setiferum A.Chev.
- Aneilema umbrosum (Vahl) Kunth
- Annona glauca Schumach. & Thonn.
- Annona muricata L.
- Annona senegalensis Pers.
- Annona squamosa L.
- Anogeissus leiocarpa (DC.) Guill. & Perr.
- Anosporum pectinatus (Vahl) Lye
- Antherotoma irvingiana (Hook.f.) Jacq.-Fél.
- Antherotoma phaeotricha (Hochst.) Jacq.-Fél.
- Antherotoma senegambiensis (Guill. & Perr.) Jacq.-Fél.
- Anthocleista djalonensis A.Chev.
- Anthocleista procera Lepr. ex A.Chev.
- Anthostema senegalense A.Juss.
- Antiaris toxicaria Lesch.
- Anticharis senegalensis (Walp.) Bhandari
- Antidesma rufescens Tul.
- Antidesma venosum E.Mey. ex Tul.
- Apodostigma pallens (Planch. ex Oliv.) R.Wilczek
- Aponogeton subconjugatus Schumach. & Thonn.
- Arachis hypogaea L.
- Argemone mexicana L.
- Argyreia nervosa (Burm.f.) Bojer
- Aristida adscensionis L.
- Aristida funiculata Trin. & Rupr.
- Aristida hordeacea Kunth
- Aristida kerstingii Pilg.
- Aristida mutabilis Trin. & Rupr.
- Aristida rhiniochloa Hochst.
- Aristida sieberiana Trin.
- Aristida stipoides Lam.
- Aristolochia albida Duch.
- Asclepias curassavica L.
- Ascolepis brasiliensis (Kunth) Benth.
- Ascolepis capensis (Kunth) Ridl.
- Ascolepis dipsacoides (Schumach.) J.Raynal
- Ascolepis protea Welw.
- Asparagus africanus Lam.
- Asparagus flagellaris (Kunth) Baker
- Asparagus schroederi Engl.
- Aspidoglossum interruptum (E.Mey.) Bullock
- Aspilia africana (Pers.) C.D.Adams
- Aspilia angustifolia Oliv. & Hiern
- Aspilia bussei O.Hoffm. & Muschl.
- Aspilia ciliata (Schumach.) Wild
- Aspilia helianthoides (Schumach. & Thonn.) Oliv. & Hiern
- Aspilia kotschyi (Sch.Bip.) Oliv.
- Aspilia paludosa Berhaut
- Aspilia rudis Oliv. & Hiern
- Astraea lobata (L.) Klotzsch
- Asystasia gangetica (L.) T.Anderson
- Averrhoa carambola L.
- Azadirachta indica A.Juss.
- Azolla africana Desv.
- Bacopa crenata (P.Beauv.) Hepper
- Bacopa decumbens (Fernald) F.N.Williams
- Bacopa floribunda (R.Br.) Wettst.
- Bacopa hamiltoniana (Benth.) Wettst.
- Bacopa occultans (Hiern) Hutch. & Dalziel
- Baissea multiflora A.DC.
- Bakerophyton lateritium (Harms) Hutch. ex Maheshw.
- Bakerophyton pulchellum (Planch. ex Baker) Maheshw.
- Balanites aegyptiaca (L.) Delile
- Bambusa vulgaris Schrad. ex J.C.Wendl.
- Barleria lupulina Lindl.
- Barleria ruellioides T.Anderson
- Basella alba L.
- Basilicum polystachyon (L.) Moench
- Batopedina tenuis (A.Chev. ex Hutch. & Dalziel) Verdc.
- Bauhinia monandra Kurz
- Bauhinia purpurea L.
- Bauhinia rufescens Lam.
- Becium obovatum (E.Mey. ex Benth.) N.E.Br.
- Bergia ammannioides Roxb. ex Roth
- Bergia capensis L.
- Bergia suffruticosa (Delile) Fenzl
- Berlinia grandiflora (Vahl) Hutch. & Dalziel
- Bidens barteri (Oliv. & Hiern) T.G.J.Rayner
- Bidens bipinnata L.
- Bidens biternata (Lour.) Merr. & Sherff
- Bidens borianiana (Sch.Bip. ex Schweinf. & Asch.) Cufod.
- Bidens engleri O.E.Schulz
- Bidens pilosa L.
- Biophytum umbraculum Welw.
- Bixa orellana L.
- Blainvillea acmella (L.) Philipson
- Blainvillea gayana Cass.
- Blepharis linariifolia Pers.
- Blepharis maderaspatensis (L.) B.Heyne ex Roth
- Blighia sapida K.D.Koenig
- Blumea adamsii J.-P.Lebrun & Stork
- Blumea axillaris (Lam.) DC.
- Blumea crispata (Vahl) Merxm.
- Blumea heudelotii (C.D.Adams) Lisowski
- Blumea oloptera DC.
- Bobgunnia madagascariensis (Desv.) J.H.Kirkbr. & Wiersema
- Boerhavia coccinea Mill.
- Boerhavia diffusa L.
- Boerhavia erecta L.
- Boerhavia repens L.
- Bolbitis heudelotii (Fee) Alston
- Bombax costatum Pellegr. & Vuill.
- Borassus aethiopum Mart.
- Borassus akeassii Bayton, Ouédr. & Guinko
- Borreria ocymoides (Burm.f.) DC.
- Boscia angustifolia A.Rich.
- Boscia salicifolia Oliv.
- Boscia senegalensis (Pers.) Lam.
- Boswellia dalzielii Hutch.
- Bothriochloa bladhii (Retz.) S.T.Blake
- Bougainvillea glabra Choisy
- Bougainvillea spectabilis Willd.
- Brachiaria deflexa (Schumach.) C.E.Hubb. ex Robyns
- Brachiaria lata (Schumach.) C.E.Hubb.
- Brachiaria mutica (Forssk.) Stapf
- Brachiaria orthostachys (Mez) Clayton
- Brachiaria plantaginea (Link) Hitchc.
- Brachiaria ramosa (L.) Stapf
- Brachiaria serrata (Thunb.) Stapf
- Brachiaria stigmatisata (Mez) Stapf
- Brachiaria villosa (Lam.) A.Camus
- Brachiaria xantholeuca (Hack.) Stapf
- Brachyachne obtusiflora (Benth.) C.E.Hubb.
- Brachycorythis macrantha (Lindl.) Summerh.
- Brachycorythis pubescens Harv.
- Brachystelma medusanthemum J.-P.Lebrun & Stork
- Brachystelma simplex Schltr.
- Brassica oleracea L.
- Breonadia salicina (Vahl) Hepper & J.R.I.Wood
- Bridelia ferruginea Benth.
- Bridelia micrantha (Hochst.) Baill.
- Bridelia scleroneura Müll.Arg.
- Bridelia speciosa Müll.Arg.
- Buchnera bowalensis A.Chev.
- Buchnera capitata Benth.
- Buchnera hispida Buch.-Ham. ex D.Don
- Buchnera leptostachya Benth.
- Bulbostylis abortiva (Steud.) C.B.Clarke
- Bulbostylis barbata (Rottb.) C.B.Clarke
- Bulbostylis boeckeleriana (Schweinf.) Beetle
- Bulbostylis cioniana (Savi) Lye
- Bulbostylis coleotricha (Hochst. ex A.Rich.) C.B.Clarke
- Bulbostylis densa (Wall.) Hand.-Mazz.
- Bulbostylis filamentosa (Vahl) C.B.Clarke
- Bulbostylis fimbristyloides C.B.Clarke
- Bulbostylis hispidula (Vahl) R.W.Haines
- Bulbostylis pilosa (Willd.) Cherm.
- Bulbostylis pusilla (Hochst. ex A.Rich.) C.B.Clarke
- Bulbostylis scabricaulis Cherm.
- Bulbostylis viridecarinata (De Wild.) Goetgh.
- Burkea africana Hook.
- Burnatia enneandra Micheli
- Butomopsis latifolia (D.Don) Kunth
- Byrsanthus brownii Guill.
- Cadaba farinosa Forssk.
- Cadaba glandulosa Forssk.
- Caesalpinia pulcherrima (L.) Sw.
- Cajanus cajan (L.) Millsp.
- Cajanus kerstingii Harms
- Caladium bicolor (Aiton) Vent.
- Calamus deerratus G.Mann & H.Wendl.
- Caldesia reniformis (D.Don) Makino
- Calopogonium mucunoides Desv.
- Calotropis procera (Aiton) R.Br.
- Calyptrochilum christyanum (Rchb.f.) Summerh.
- Calyptrochilum emarginatum (Sw.) Schltr.
- Campylospermum flavum (Schumach. & Thonn.) Farron
- Campylospermum glaberrimum (P.Beauv.) Farron
- Campylospermum squamosum (DC.) Farron
- Canarium schweinfurthii Engl.
- Canavalia africana Dunn
- Canavalia ensiformis (L.) DC.
- Canscora decussata (Roxb.) Roem. & Schult.
- Canscora diffusa (Vahl) R.Br. ex Roem. & Schult.
- Caperonia serrata (Turcz.) C.Presl
- Capparis erythrocarpos Isert
- Capparis fascicularis DC.
- Capparis sepiaria L.
- Capparis tomentosa Lam.
- Capsicum annuum L.
- Capsicum chinense Jacq.
- Capsicum frutescens L.
- Caralluma adscendens (Roxb.) Haw.
- Carapa procera DC.
- Cardiospermum halicacabum L.
- Carica papaya L.
- Carissa spinarum (Forssk.) Vahl
- Caryota mitis Lour.
- Cascabela thevetia (L.) Lippold
- Cassia sieberiana DC.
- Cassipourea congoensis DC.
- Cassytha filiformis L.
- Casuarina equisetifolia L.
- Catharanthus roseus (L.) G.Don
- Cayratia debilis (Baker) Suess.
- Cayratia delicatula (Willems) Desc.
- Cayratia gracilis (Guill. & Perr.) Suess.
- Ceiba pentandra (L.) Gaertn.
- Celosia argentea L.
- Celosia trigyna L.
- Celtis toka (Forssk.) Hepper & J.R.I.Wood
- Cenchrus biflorus Roxb.
- Cenchrus ciliaris L.
- Cenchrus prieurii (Kunth) Maire
- Cenchrus purpureus (Schumach.) Morrone
- Centaurea praecox Oliv. & Hiern
- Centaurea senegalensis DC.
- Centella asiatica (L.) Urb.
- Centrosema pubescens Benth.
- Centrostachys aquatica (R.Br.) Wall.
- Ceratophyllum demersum L.
- Ceratopteris cornuta (P.Beauv.) Lepr.
- Ceratotheca sesamoides Endl.
- Ceropegia campanulata G.Don
- Ceropegia deightonii Hutch. & Dalziel
- Ceropegia fusiformis N.E.Br.
- Ceropegia nilotica Kotschy
- Ceropegia racemosa N.E.Br.
- Ceropegia rhynchantha Schltr.
- Ceropegia sankuruensis Schltr.
- Ceruana pratensis Forssk.
- Chamaecrista absus L.
- Chamaecrista kirkii (Oliv.)
- Chamaecrista nigricans (Vahl)
- Chamaecrista pratensis (R.Vig.) Du Puy
- Chascanum laetum Walp.
- Chasmanthera dependens Hochst.
- Chasmopodium caudatum (Hack.) Stapf
- Chionanthus niloticus (Oliv.) Stearn
- Chloris barbata Sw.
- Chloris pilosa Schumach.
- Chloris robusta Stapf
- Chloris virgata Sw.
- Chlorophytum blepharophyllum Schweinf. ex Baker
- Chlorophytum caulescens (Baker) Marais & Reilly
- Chlorophytum gallabatense Schweinf. ex Baker
- Chlorophytum geophilum Peter ex Poelln.
- Chlorophytum lancifolium Baker
- Chlorophytum laxum R.Br.
- Chlorophytum limosum (Baker) Nordal
- Chlorophytum macrophyllum (A.Rich.) Asch.
- Chlorophytum nzii A.Chev. ex Hepper
- Chlorophytum orchidastrum Lindl.
- Chlorophytum polystachys Baker
- Chlorophytum pusillum Schweinf. ex Baker
- Chlorophytum senegalense (Baker) Hepper
- Chlorophytum stenopetalum Baker
- Christiana africana DC.
- Chrozophora brocchiana (Vis.) Schweinf.
- Chrozophora plicata (Vahl) A.Juss. ex Spreng.
- Chrozophora senegalensis (Lam.) A.Juss. ex Spreng.
- Chrysanthellum indicum DC.
- Chrysochloa hindsii C.E.Hubb.
- Chrysopogon aciculatus (Retz.) Trin.
- Chrysopogon nigritanus (Benth.) Veldkamp
- Cienfuegosia digitata Cav.
- Cienfuegosia heteroclada Sprague
- Cissampelos mucronata A.Rich.
- Cissus aralioides (Baker) Planch.
- Cissus arguta Hook.f.
- Cissus cornifolia (Baker) Planch.
- Cissus corylifolia (Baker) Planch.
- Cissus diffusiflora (Baker) Planch.
- Cissus doeringii Gilg & M.Brandt
- Cissus palmatifida (Baker) Planch.
- Cissus petiolata Hook.f.
- Cissus polyantha Gilg & M.Brandt
- Cissus populnea Guill. & Perr.
- Cissus producta Afzel.
- Cissus quadrangularis L.
- Cissus rubiginosa (Welw. ex Baker) Planch.
- Cissus rufescens Guill. & Perr.
- Citrullus colocynthis (L.) Schrad.
- Citrullus lanatus (Thunb.) Matsum. & Nakai
- Citrus aurantium L.
- Citrus limon (L.) Burm.f.
- Citrus reticulata Blanco
- Clappertonia ficifolia (Willd.) Decne.
- Cleistopholis patens (Benth.) Engl. & Diels
- Clematis hirsuta Guill. & Perr.
- Cleome gynandra L.
- Cleome monophylla L.
- Cleome polyanthera Schweinf. & Gilg
- Cleome scaposa DC.
- Cleome tenella L.
- Cleome viscosa L.
- Clerodendrum capitatum (Willd.) Schumach.
- Clerodendrum polycephalum Baker
- Clerodendrum thyrsoideum Gürke
- Clitoria ternatea L.
- Cochlospermum planchonii Hook.f.
- Cochlospermum tinctorium Perr. ex A.Rich.
- Cocos nucifera L.
- Codiaeum variegatum (L.) A.Juss.
- Coelorachis afraurita (Stapf) Stapf
- Coffea ebracteolata (Hiern) Brenan
- Cola cordifolia (Cav.) R.Br.
- Cola gigantea A.Chev.
- Cola laurifolia Mast.
- Cola nitida (Vent.) Schott & Endl.
- Coldenia procumbens L.
- Colocasia esculenta (L.) Schott
- Combretum aculeatum Vent.
- Combretum acutum M.A.Lawson
- Combretum adenogonium Steud. ex A.Rich.
- Combretum collinum Fresen.
- Combretum glutinosum Perr. ex DC.
- Combretum indicum (L.) Jongkind
- Combretum lecardii Engl. & Diels
- Combretum micranthum G.Don
- Combretum molle R.Br. ex G.Don
- Combretum nigricans Lepr. ex Guill. & Perr.
- Combretum nioroense Aubrév. ex Keay
- Combretum paniculatum Vent.
- Combretum racemosum P.Beauv.
- Combretum sericeum G.Don
- Combretum tomentosum G.Don
- Commelina africana L.
- Commelina aspera Benth.
- Commelina benghalensis L.
- Commelina bracteosa Hassk.
- Commelina diffusa Burm.f.
- Commelina erecta L.
- Commelina forsskaolii Vahl
- Commelina lagosensis C.B.Clarke
- Commelina nigritana Benth.
- Commelina subulata Roth
- Commicarpus helenae (Schult.) Meikle
- Commiphora africana (A.Rich.) Engl.
- Commiphora pedunculata (Kotschy & Peyr.) Engl.
- Convolvulus prostratus Forssk.
- Corallocarpus epigaeus (Rottler) C.B.Clarke
- Corchorus aestuans L.
- Corchorus fascicularis Lam.
- Corchorus olitorius L.
- Corchorus tridens L.
- Corchorus trilocularis L.
- Cordia myxa L.
- Cordia sebestena L.
- Cordia sinensis Lam.
- Cordyla pinnata (Lepr. ex A.Rich.) Milne-Redh.
- Costus afer Ker Gawl.
- Costus lucanusianus J.Braun & K.Schum.
- Costus spectabilis (Fenzl) K.Schum.
- Craterostigma plantagineum Hochst.
- Crateva adansonii DC.
- Cremaspora triflora (Thonn.) K.Schum.
- Crepidorhopalon debilis (Skan) Eb.Fisch.
- Crepidorhopalon spicatus (Engl.) Eb.Fisch.
- Crescentia cujete L.
- Crinum distichum Herb.
- Crinum nubicum Hannibal
- Crinum ornatum (L.f. ex Aiton) Bury
- Crossopteryx febrifuga (Afzel. ex G.Don) Benth.
- Crotalaria arenaria Benth.
- Crotalaria atrorubens Hochst. ex Benth.
- Crotalaria barkae Schweinf.
- Crotalaria bongensis Baker f.
- Crotalaria calycina Schrank
- Crotalaria cephalotes Steud. ex A.Rich.
- Crotalaria cleomifolia Welw. ex Baker
- Crotalaria comosa Baker
- Crotalaria confusa Hepper
- Crotalaria cylindrocarpa DC.
- Crotalaria deightonii Hepper
- Crotalaria ebenoides (Guill. & Perr.) Walp.
- Crotalaria glauca Willd.
- Crotalaria goreensis Guill. & Perr.
- Crotalaria graminicola Taub. ex Baker f.
- Crotalaria hyssopifolia Klotzsch
- Crotalaria juncea L.
- Crotalaria lachnosema Stapf
- Crotalaria lathyroides Guill. & Perr.
- Crotalaria leprieurii Guill. & Perr.
- Crotalaria macrocalyx Benth.
- Crotalaria microcarpa Hochst. ex Benth.
- Crotalaria naragutensis Hutch.
- Crotalaria ochroleuca G.Don
- Crotalaria ononoides Benth.
- Crotalaria pallida Aiton
- Crotalaria perrottetii DC.
- Crotalaria podocarpa DC.
- Crotalaria pseudotenuirama Torre
- Crotalaria retusa L.
- Crotalaria senegalensis (Pers.) Bacle ex DC.
- Crotalaria trichotoma Bojer
- Croton gratissimus Burch.
- Croton hirtus L'Hér.
- Croton nigritanus Scott-Elliot
- Croton pseudopulchellus Pax
- Croton scarciesii Scott-Elliot
- Cryptolepis oblongifolia (Meisn.) Schltr.
- Cryptolepis sanguinolenta (Lindl.) Schltr.
- Cryptostegia grandiflora R.Br. ex Lindl.
- Ctenium canescens Benth.
- Ctenium elegans Kunth
- Ctenium newtonii Hack.
- Ctenium villosum Berhaut
- Ctenolepis cerasiformis (Stocks) Hook.f.
- Cucumis anguria L.
- Cucumis maderaspatanus L.
- Cucumis melo L.
- Cucumis metuliferus E.Mey. ex Naudin
- Cucumis prophetarum L.
- Cucumis sativus L.
- Cucurbita pepo L.
- Culcasia saxatilis A.Chev.
- Curculigo pilosa (Schumach. & Thonn.) Engl.
- Cuscuta australis R.Br.
- Cuscuta campestris Yunck.
- Cussonia arborea Hochst. ex A.Rich.
- Cyamopsis senegalensis Guill. & Perr.
- Cyanotis angusta C.B.Clarke
- Cyanotis caespitosa Kotschy & Peyr.
- Cyanotis lanata Benth.
- Cyanotis longifolia Benth.
- Cyanthillium cinereum (L.) H.Rob. (Vernonia cinerea)
- Cyathula achyranthoides (Kunth) Moq.
- Cyathula prostrata (L.) Blume
- Cycas revoluta Thunb.
- Cyclocarpa stellaris Afzel. ex Baker
- Cycnium tubulosum (L.f.) Engl.
- Cymbopogon caesius (Nees ex Hook. & Arn.) Stapf
- Cymbopogon schoenanthus (L.) Spreng.
- Cynanchum hastifolium K.Schum.
- Cynodon dactylon (L.) Pers.
- Cyperus alopecuroides Rottb.
- Cyperus amabilis Vahl
- Cyperus articulatus L.
- Cyperus compressus L.
- Cyperus conglomeratus Rottb.
- Cyperus cuspidatus Kunth
- Cyperus denudatus L.f.
- Cyperus difformis L.
- Cyperus digitatus Roxb.
- Cyperus dilatatus Schumach. & Thonn.
- Cyperus distans L.f.
- Cyperus dives Delile
- Cyperus esculentus L.
- Cyperus exaltatus Retz.
- Cyperus haspan L.
- Cyperus imbricatus Retz.
- Cyperus incompressus C.B.Clarke
- Cyperus iria L.
- Cyperus jeminicus Rottb.
- Cyperus karlschumannii C.B.Clarke
- Cyperus longus L.
- Cyperus maculatus Boeckeler
- Cyperus margaritaceus Vahl
- Cyperus niveus Retz.
- Cyperus podocarpus Boeckeler
- Cyperus procerus Rottb.
- Cyperus pulchellus R.Br.
- Cyperus pustulatus Vahl
- Cyperus reduncus Hochst. ex Boeckeler
- Cyperus remotispicatus S.S.Hooper
- Cyperus rotundus L.
- Cyperus sphacelatus Rottb.
- Cyperus submicrolepis Kük.
- Cyperus tenuiculmis Boeckeler
- Cyperus tenuispica Steud.
- Cyperus zollingeri Steud.
- Cyphostemma adenocaule (Steud. ex A.Rich.) Desc. ex Wild & R.B.Drumm.
- Cyphostemma crotalarioides (Planch.) Desc. ex Wild & R.B.Drumm.
- Cyphostemma cymosum (Schumach. & Thonn.) Desc.
- Cyphostemma flavicans (Baker) Desc.
- Cyphostemma junceum (Webb) Wild & R.B.Drumm.
- Cyphostemma lageniflorum (Gilg & M.Brandt) Desc.
- Cyphostemma sokodense (Gilg & M.Brandt) Desc.
- Cyphostemma vogelii (Hook.f.) Desc.
- Cyphostemma waterlotii (A.Chev.) Desc.
- Dactyloctenium aegyptium (L.) Willd.
- Dalbergia bignonae Berhaut
- Dalbergia hostilis Benth.
- Dalbergia melanoxylon Guill. & Perr.
- Dalbergia saxatilis Hook.f.
- Dalbergia sissoo Roxb. ex. DC.
- Dalechampia scandens L.
- Daniellia oliveri (Rolfe) Hutch. & Dalziel
- Datura innoxia Mill.
- Delonix regia (Bojer ex Hook.) Raf.
- Desmidorchis acutangula Decne.
- Desmodium adscendens (Sw.) DC.
- Desmodium barbatum (L.) Benth.
- Desmodium gangeticum (L.) DC.
- Desmodium hirtum Guill. & Perr.
- Desmodium laxiflorum DC.
- Desmodium linearifolium G.Don
- Desmodium ospriostreblum Chiov.
- Desmodium salicifolium (Poir.) DC.
- Desmodium setigerum (E.Mey.) Benth. ex Harv.
- Desmodium tortuosum (Sw.) DC.
- Desmodium velutinum (Willd.) DC.
- Detarium microcarpum Guill. & Perr.
- Detarium senegalense J.F.Gmel.
- Dialium guineense Willd.
- Dichrostachys cinerea (L.) Wight & Arn.
- Dicliptera paniculata (Forssk.) I.Darbysh.
- Dicliptera verticillata (Forssk.) C.Chr.
- Dicoma tomentosa Cass.
- Diectomis fastigiata Sw.
- Digitaria argillacea (Hitchc. & Chase) Fernald
- Digitaria ciliaris (Retz.) Koeler
- Digitaria debilis (Desf.) Willd.
- Digitaria delicata Goetgh.
- Digitaria delicatula Stapf
- Digitaria diagonalis (Nees) Stapf
- Digitaria exilis (Kippist) Stapf
- Digitaria gayana (Kunth) A.Chev. ex Stapf
- Digitaria horizontalis Willd.
- Digitaria leptorhachis (Pilg.) Stapf
- Digitaria longiflora (Retz.) Pers.
- Digitaria ternata (A.Rich.) Stapf
- Digitaria velutina (Forssk.) P.Beauv.
- Diheteropogon amplectens (Nees) Clayton
- Diheteropogon hagerupii Hitchc.
- Dinebra retroflexa (Vahl) Panz.
- Dioscorea abyssinica Hochst. ex Kunth
- Dioscorea alata L.
- Dioscorea bulbifera L.
- Dioscorea cayenensis Lam.
- Dioscorea dumetorum (Kunth) Pax
- Dioscorea esculenta (Lour.) Burkill
- Dioscorea hirtiflora Benth.
- Dioscorea minutiflora Engl.
- Dioscorea praehensilis Benth.
- Dioscorea quartiniana A.Rich.
- Dioscorea sagittifolia Pax
- Dioscorea schimperiana Hochst. ex Kunth
- Dioscorea smilacifolia De Wild.
- Dioscorea togoensis R.Knuth
- Diospyros abyssinica (Hiern) F.White
- Diospyros elliotii (Hiern) F.White
- Diospyros ferrea (Willd.) Bakh.
- Diospyros mespiliformis Hochst. ex A.DC.
- Dipcadi longifolium (Lindl.) Baker
- Diplacrum africanum (Benth.) C.B.Clarke
- Dissomeria crenata Hook.f. ex Benth.
- Dissotis thollonii Cogn. ex Büttner
- Dodonaea viscosa Jacq.
- Dombeya buettneri K.Schum.
- Dombeya quinqueseta (Delile) Exell
- Dopatrium junceum (Roxb.) Buch.-Ham. ex Benth.
- Dopatrium longidens Skan
- Dopatrium macranthum Oliv.
- Dopatrium senegalense Benth.
- Dorstenia cuspidata Hochst. ex A.Rich.
- Doryopteris kirkii (Hook.) Alston
- Dregea abyssinica (Hochst.) K.Schum.
- Drimia altissima (L.f.) Ker Gawl.
- Drimia indica (Roxb.) Jessop
- Drosera indica L.
- Drypetes floribunda (Müll.Arg.) Hutch.
- Duranta erecta L.
- Dyschoriste heudelotiana (Nees) Kuntze
- Dyschoriste nagchana (Nees) Bennet
- Echinochloa callopus (Pilg.) Clayton
- Echinochloa colona (L.) Link
- Echinochloa crus-galli (L.) P.Beauv.
- Echinochloa pyramidalis (Lam.) Hitchc. & Chase
- Echinochloa stagnina (Retz.) P.Beauv.
- Echinops longifolius A.Rich.
- Eclipta prostrata (L.) L.
- Eichhornia crassipes (Mart.) Solms
- Eichhornia natans (P.Beauv.) Solms
- Ekebergia capensis Sparrm.
- Elaeis guineensis Jacq.
- Eleocharis acutangula (Roxb.) Schult.
- Eleocharis atropurpurea (Retz.) C.Presl
- Eleocharis complanata Boeckeler
- Eleocharis dulcis (Burm.f.) Trin. ex Hensch.
- Eleocharis geniculata (L.) Roem. & Schult.
- Eleocharis mutata (L.) Roem. & Schult.
- Eleocharis setifolia (A.Rich.) J.Raynal
- Eleocharis variegata (Poir.) C.Presl
- Elephantopus mollis Kunth
- Elephantopus senegalensis (Klatt) Oliv. & Hiern
- Eleusine coracana (L.) Gaertn.
- Eleusine indica (L.) Gaertn.
- Eleutheranthera ruderalis (Sw.) Sch.Bip.
- Elionurus ciliaris Kunth
- Elionurus elegans Kunth
- Elionurus euchaetus Adjan. & Clayton
- Elionurus hirtifolius Hack.
- Elionurus muticus (Spreng.) Kuntze
- Elymandra androphila (Stapf) Stapf
- Elymandra gossweileri (Stapf) Clayton
- Elytraria marginata Vahl
- Elytrophorus spicatus (Willd.) A.Camus
- Embelia guineensis Baker
- Embelia rowlandii Gilg
- Endostemon tereticaulis (Poir.) M.Ashby
- Englerastrum schweinfurthii Briq.
- Englerina lecardii (Engl.) Balle
- Entada abyssinica Steud. ex A.Rich.
- Entada africana Guill. & Perr.
- Entada wahlbergii Harv.
- Enteropogon prieurii (Kunth) Clayton
- Enteropogon rupestris (J.A.Schmidt) A.Chev.
- Enydra fluctuans Lour.
- Eragrostis aegyptiaca (Willd.) Delile
- Eragrostis amabilis (L.) Wight & Arn.
- Eragrostis aspera (Jacq.) Nees
- Eragrostis atrovirens (Desf.) Trin. ex Steud.
- Eragrostis barteri C.E.Hubb.
- Eragrostis cilianensis (All.) Vignolo ex Janch.
- Eragrostis ciliaris (L.) R.Br.
- Eragrostis domingensis (Pers.) Steud.
- Eragrostis dumasiana A.Chev.
- Eragrostis egregia Clayton
- Eragrostis elegantissima Chiov.
- Eragrostis gangetica (Roxb.) Steud.
- Eragrostis japonica (Thunb.) Trin.
- Eragrostis lingulata Clayton
- Eragrostis pilosa (L.) P.Beauv.
- Eragrostis squamata (Lam.) Steud.
- Eragrostis superba Peyr.
- Eragrostis tremula Hochst. ex Steud.
- Eragrostis turgida (Schumach.) De Wild.
- Eriocaulon afzelianum Wikstr. ex Körn.
- Eriocaulon cinereum R.Br.
- Eriocaulon latifolium Sm.
- Eriocaulon nigericum Meikle
- Eriocaulon plumale N.E.Br.
- Eriocaulon pulchellum Körn.
- Eriocaulon togoense Moldenke
- Eriochloa fatmensis (Hochst. & Steud.) Clayton
- Eriocoelum kerstingii Gilg ex Engl.
- Eriosema afzelii Baker
- Eriosema andohii Milne-Redh.
- Eriosema glomeratum (Guill. & Perr.) Hook.f.
- Eriosema griseum Baker
- Eriosema macrostipulum Baker f.
- Eriosema molle Hutch. ex Milne-Redh.
- Eriosema pellegrinii Tisser.
- Eriosema psoraloides (Lam.) G.Don
- Eriosema pulcherrimum Taub.
- Eriosema sacleuxii Tisser.
- Eriospermum flagelliforme (Baker) J.C.Manning
- Erythrina senegalensis A.DC.
- Erythrina sigmoidea Hua
- Erythrophleum africanum (Welw. ex Benth.) Harms
- Erythrophleum suaveolens (Guill. & Perr.) Brenan
- Erythroxylum emarginatum Thonn.
- Ethulia conyzoides L.f.
- Eucalyptus camaldulensis Dehnh.
- Eucalyptus torreliana F.Muell.
- Euclasta condylotricha (Hochst. ex Steud.) Stapf
- Eugenia nigerina A.Chev.
- Eulophia angolensis (Rchb.f.) Summerh.
- Eulophia cristata (Sw.) Steud.
- Eulophia guineensis Lindl.
- Eulophia juncifolia Summerh.
- Euphorbia baga A.Chev.
- Euphorbia balsamifera Aiton
- Euphorbia convolvuloides Hochst. ex Benth.
- Euphorbia cotinifolia L.
- Euphorbia forskalii J.Gay
- Euphorbia glomerifera (Millsp.) L.C.Wheeler
- Euphorbia heterophylla L.
- Euphorbia hirta L.
- Euphorbia hypericifolia L.
- Euphorbia hyssopifolia L.
- Euphorbia inaequilatera Sond.
- Euphorbia kerstingii Pax
- Euphorbia macrophylla Pax
- Euphorbia paganorum A.Chev.
- Euphorbia poissoni Pax
- Euphorbia polycnemoides Hochst. ex Boiss.
- Euphorbia prostrata Aiton
- Euphorbia pulcherrima Willd. ex Klotzsch
- Euphorbia scordifolia Jacq.
- Euphorbia serpens Kunth
- Euphorbia sudanica A.Chev.
- Euphorbia thymifolia L.
- Euphorbia tirucalli L.
- Euphorbia unispina N.E.Br.
- Euploca ovalifolia (Forssk.) Diane & Hilger
- Euploca strigosa (Willd.) Diane & Hilger
- Evolvulus alsinoides (L.) L.
- Evolvulus nummularius (L.) L.
- Excoecaria grahamii Stapf
- Excoecaria guineensis (Benth.) Müll.Arg.
- Fadogia agrestis Schweinf. ex Hiern
- Fadogia andersonii Robyns
- Fadogia cienkowskii Schweinf.
- Fadogia erythrophloea (K.Schum. & K.Krause) Hutch. & Dalziel
- Fadogia pobeguinii Pobeg.
- Fadogia tetraquetra K.Krause
- Faidherbia albida (Delile) A.Chev.
- Faroa pusilla Baker
- Farsetia stenoptera Hochst.
- Feretia apodanthera Delile
- Ficus abutilifolia (Miq.) Miq.
- Ficus artocarpoides Warb.
- Ficus asperifolia Miq.
- Ficus capreifolia Delile
- Ficus carica L.
- Ficus cordata Thunb.
- Ficus craterostoma Warb. ex Mildbr. & Burret
- Ficus dicranostyla Mildbr.
- Ficus elasticoides De Wild.
- Ficus exasperata Vahl
- Ficus glumosa Delile
- Ficus ingens (Miq.) Miq.
- Ficus lutea Vahl.
- Ficus natalensis Hochst.
- Ficus ovata Vahl
- Ficus platyphylla Delile
- Ficus polita Vahl
- Ficus populifolia Vahl
- Ficus scott-elliotii Mildbr. & Burret
- Ficus sur Forssk.
- Ficus sycomorus L.
- Ficus thonningii Blume
- Ficus trichopoda Baker
- Ficus umbellata Vahl
- Ficus vallis-choudae Delile
- Ficus vogeliana (Miq.) Miq.
- Fimbristylis alboviridis C.B.Clarke
- Fimbristylis barteri Boeckeler
- Fimbristylis bisumbellata (Forssk.) Bubani
- Fimbristylis debilis Steud.
- Fimbristylis dichotoma (L.) Vahl
- Fimbristylis ferruginea (L.) Vahl
- Fimbristylis littoralis Gand.
- Fimbristylis microcarya F.Muell.
- Fimbristylis pilosa (Poir.) Vahl
- Fimbristylis quinquangularis (Vahl) Kunth
- Fimbristylis scabrida Schumach.
- Fimbristylis striolata Napper
- Flabellaria paniculata Cav.
- Flacourtia indica (Burm.f.) Merr.
- Flemingia faginea (Guill. & Perr.) Baker
- Floscopa africana (P.Beauv.) C.B.Clarke
- Floscopa axillaris (Poir.) C.B.Clarke
- Floscopa flavida C.B.Clarke
- Floscopa glomerata (Willd. ex Schult. & Schult.f.) Hassk.
- Flueggea virosa (Roxb. ex Willd.) Voigt
- Fuirena ciliaris (L.) Roxb.
- Fuirena leptostachya Oliv.
- Fuirena stricta Steud.
- Fuirena umbellata Rottb.
- Gaertnera paniculata Benth.
- Garcinia livingstonei T.Anderson
- Garcinia ovalifolia Oliv.
- Gardenia aqualla Stapf & Hutch.
- Gardenia erubescens Stapf & Hutch.
- Gardenia imperialis K.Schum.
- Gardenia nitida Hook.
- Gardenia sokotensis Hutch.
- Gardenia ternifolia Schumach. & Thonn.
- Genlisea africana Oliv.
- Geophila repens (L.) I.M.Johnst.
- Gisekia pharnaceoides L.
- Gladiolus atropurpureus Baker
- Gladiolus dalenii Van Geel
- Gladiolus gregarius Welw. ex Baker
- Gladiolus oligophlebius Baker
- Glinus lotoides L.
- Glinus oppositifolius (L.) Aug.DC.
- Glinus radiatus (Ruíz & Pav.) Rohrb.
- Gliricidia sepium (Jacq.) Walp.
- Gloriosa simplex L.
- Gloriosa superba L.
- Glossonema boveanum (Decne.) Decne.
- Gmelina arborea Roxb.
- Gnidia kraussiana Meisn.
- Gomphrena celosioides Mart.
- Gomphrena globosa L.
- Gongronema latifolium Benth.
- Gongronema obscurum Bullock
- Gossypium anomalum Wawra ex Wawra & Peyr.
- Gossypium barbadense L.
- Gossypium herbaceum L.
- Gossypium hirsutum L.
- Grangea ceruanoides Cass.
- Grangea maderaspatana (L.) Desf.
- Grewia barteri Burret
- Grewia bicolor Juss.
- Grewia carpinifolia Juss.
- Grewia cissoides Hutch. & Dalziel
- Grewia flavescens Juss.
- Grewia lasiodiscus K.Schum.
- Grewia mollis Juss.
- Grewia tenax (Forssk.) Fiori
- Grewia villosa Willd.
- Guibourtia copallifera Benn.
- Guiera senegalensis J.F.Gmel.
- Gymnema sylvestre (Retz.) Schult.
- Gymnosporia senegalensis (Lam.) Loes.
- Habenaria armatissima Rchb.f.
- Habenaria bongensium Rchb.f.
- Habenaria ichneumonea (Sw.) Lindl.
- Habenaria lecardii Kraenzl.
- Habenaria longirostris Summerh.
- Habenaria procera (Sw. ex Pers.) Lindl.
- Habenaria zambesina Rchb. f.
- Hackelochloa granularis (L.) Kuntze
- Haematostaphis barteri Hook.f.
- Harungana madagascariensis Lam. ex Poir.
- Haumaniastrum caeruleum (Oliv.) P.A.Duvign. & Plancke
- Heliotropium bacciferum Forssk.
- Heliotropium crispum Desf.
- Heliotropium indicum L.
- Heliotropium zeylanicum (Burm.f.) Lam.
- Herderia truncata Cass.
- Hermannia tigrensis Hochst. ex A.Rich.
- Heteranthera callifolia Rchb. ex Kunth
- Heteropogon contortus (L.) Roem. & Schult.
- Heteropogon melanocarpus (Elliott) Benth.
- Hexalobus monopetalus (A.Rich.) Engl. & Diels
- Hibiscus articulatus Hochst. ex A.Rich.
- Hibiscus cannabinus L.
- Hibiscus congestiflorus Hochr.
- Hibiscus diversifolius Jacq.
- Hibiscus gourmania Hutch. & Dalziel
- Hibiscus lobatus (Murray) Kuntze
- Hibiscus longisepalus Hochr.
- Hibiscus mechowii Garcke
- Hibiscus micranthus L.f.
- Hibiscus owariensis P.Beauv.
- Hibiscus panduriformis Burm.f.
- Hibiscus physaloides Guill. & Perr.
- Hibiscus rosa-sinensis L.
- Hibiscus rostellatus Guill. & Perr.
- Hibiscus sabdariffa L.
- Hibiscus schizopetalus (Mast.) Hook.f.
- Hibiscus scotellii Baker f.
- Hibiscus sidiformis Baill.
- Hibiscus squamosus Hochr.
- Hibiscus sterculiifolius (Guill. & Perr.) Steud.
- Hibiscus trionum L.
- Hibiscus whytei Stapf
- Holarrhena floribunda (G.Don) T.Durand & Schinz
- Hoslundia opposita Vahl
- Hybanthus enneaspermus (L.) F.Muell.
- Hydrolea floribunda Kotschy & Peyr.
- Hydrolea macrosepala A.W.Benn.
- Hydrolea palustris (Aubl.) Raeusch.
- Hygrophila africana (T.Anderson) Heine
- Hygrophila auriculata (Schumach.) Heine
- Hygrophila niokoloensis Berhaut
- Hygrophila odora (Nees) T.Anderson
- Hygrophila pobeguinii Benoist
- Hygrophila senegalensis (Nees) T.Anderson
- Hymenocardia acida Tul.
- Hymenocardia heudelotii Müll.Arg.
- Hymenocardia lyrata Tul.
- Hyparrhenia bagirmica (Stapf) Stapf
- Hyparrhenia barteri (Hack.) Stapf
- Hyparrhenia bracteata (Humb. & Bonpl. ex Willd.) Stapf
- Hyparrhenia cyanescens (Stapf) Stapf
- Hyparrhenia diplandra (Hack.) Stapf
- Hyparrhenia exarmata (Stapf) Stapf
- Hyparrhenia filipendula (Hochst.) Stapf
- Hyparrhenia glabriuscula (Hochst. ex A.Rich.) Stapf
- Hyparrhenia involucrata Stapf
- Hyparrhenia rudis Stapf
- Hyparrhenia rufa (Nees) Stapf
- Hyparrhenia smithiana (Hook.f.) Stapf
- Hyparrhenia subplumosa Stapf
- Hyparrhenia violascens (Stapf) Clayton
- Hyparrhenia welwitschii (Rendle) Stapf
- Hyperthelia dissoluta (Nees ex Steud.) Clayton
- Hyphaene thebaica (L.) Mart.
- Hypoestes aristata (Vahl) Sol. ex Roem. & Schult.
- Hypoestes cancellata Nees
- Hypoestes forskaolii (Vahl) R.Br.
- Hypoestes strobilifera S.Moore
- Hyptis lanceolata Poir.
- Hyptis spicigera Lam.
- Hyptis suaveolens Poit.
- Imperata cylindrica (L.) Raeusch.
- Indigofera aspera Perr. ex DC.
- Indigofera barteri Hutch. & Dalziel
- Indigofera berhautiana J.B.Gillett
- Indigofera bracteolata DC.
- Indigofera capitata Kotschy
- Indigofera colutea (Burm.f.) Merr.
- Indigofera congesta Welw. ex Baker
- Indigofera congolensis De Wild. & T.Durand
- Indigofera conjugata Baker
- Indigofera costata Guill. & Perr.
- Indigofera dendroides Jacq.
- Indigofera diphylla Vent.
- Indigofera fulvopilosa Brenan
- Indigofera geminata Baker
- Indigofera hirsuta L.
- Indigofera hochstetteri Baker
- Indigofera kerstingii Harms
- Indigofera leprieurii Baker f.
- Indigofera leptoclada Harms
- Indigofera macrocalyx Guill. & Perr.
- Indigofera macrophylla Schumach. & Thonn.
- Indigofera microcarpa Desv.
- Indigofera nigricans Vahl ex Pers.
- Indigofera nigritana Hook.f.
- Indigofera nummulariifolia (L.) Livera ex Alston
- Indigofera oblongifolia Forssk.
- Indigofera omissa J.B.Gillett
- Indigofera oubanguiensis Tisser.
- Indigofera paniculata Vahl ex Pers.
- Indigofera pilosa Poir.
- Indigofera polysphaera Baker
- Indigofera prieureana Guill. & Perr.
- Indigofera pulchra Willd.
- Indigofera secundiflora Poir.
- Indigofera senegalensis Lam.
- Indigofera sessiliflora DC.
- Indigofera simplicifolia Lam.
- Indigofera spicata Forssk.
- Indigofera stenophylla Guill. & Perr.
- Indigofera strobilifera (Hochst.) Hochst. ex Baker
- Indigofera suffruticosa Mill.
- Indigofera terminalis Baker
- Indigofera tetrasperma Vahl ex Pers.
- Indigofera tinctoria L.
- Indigofera trichopoda Lepr. ex Guill. & Perr.
- Indigofera trita L.f.
- Iphigenia pauciflora Martelli
- Ipomoea aquatica Forssk.
- Ipomoea argentaurata Hallier f.
- Ipomoea asarifolia (Desr.) Roem. & Schult.
- Ipomoea barteri Baker
- Ipomoea batatas (L.) Lam.
- Ipomoea blepharophylla Hallier f.
- Ipomoea cairica (L.) Sweet
- Ipomoea carnea Jacq.
- Ipomoea chrysochaetia Hallier.f.
- Ipomoea coptica (L.) Roth ex Roem. & Schult.
- Ipomoea coscinosperma Hochst. ex Choisy
- Ipomoea dichroa Choisy
- Ipomoea eriocarpa R.Br.
- Ipomoea heterotricha Didr.
- Ipomoea involucrata P.Beauv.
- Ipomoea kotschyana Hochst. ex Choisy
- Ipomoea marginata (Desr.) Verdc.
- Ipomoea mauritiana Jacq.
- Ipomoea nil (L.) Roth
- Ipomoea obscura (L.) Ker Gawl.
- Ipomoea ochracea (Lindl.) G.Don
- Ipomoea pes-tigridis L.
- Ipomoea pileata Roxb.
- Ipomoea quamoclit L.
- Ipomoea rubens Choisy
- Ipomoea setifera Poir.
- Ipomoea triloba L.
- Ipomoea turbinata Lag.
- Ipomoea vagans Baker
- Ipomoea verbascoidea Choisy
- Ipomoea verticillata Forssk.
- Ischaemum afrum (J.F.Gmel.) Dandy
- Ischaemum amethystinum J.-P.Lebrun
- Ischaemum fasciculatum Brongn.
- Ischaemum rugosum Salisb.
- Isoberlinia doka Craib & Stapf
- Isoberlinia tomentosa (Harms) Craib & Stapf
- Isoetes jaegeri Pitot
- Isoetes nigritiana A.Br. ex Kuhn
- Isoetes schweinfurthii Baker
- Ixora brachypoda DC.
- Ixora javanica (Blume) DC.
- Jacquemontia tamnifolia (L.) Griseb.
- Jasminum dichotomum Vahl
- Jasminum kerstingii Gilg & G.Schellenb.
- Jasminum obtusifolium Baker
- Jatropha curcas L.
- Jatropha gossypiifolia L.
- Jatropha integerrima Jacq.
- Jatropha kamerunica Pax & K.Hoffm.
- Justicia flava (Vahl) Vahl
- Justicia insularis T.Anderson
- Justicia ladanoides Lam.
- Justicia striata (Klotzsch) Bullock
- Justicia tenella (Nees) T.Anderson
- Kalanchoe crenata (Andrews) Haw.
- Kalanchoe lanceolata (Forssk.) Pers.
- Kallstroemia pubescens (G.Don) Dandy
- Keetia cornelia (Cham. & Schltdl.) Bridson
- Keetia leucantha (K.Krause) Bridson
- Keetia mannii (Hiern) Bridson
- Keetia venosa (Oliv.) Bridson
- Khaya grandifoliola C.DC.
- Khaya senegalensis (Desr.) A.Juss.
- Kigelia africana (Lam.) Benth.
- Kinghamia macrocephala (Oliv. & Hiern) C.Jeffrey
- Kinghamia nigritana (Benth.) C.Jeffrey
- Kohautia confusa (Hutch. & Dalziel) Bremek.
- Kohautia grandiflora DC.
- Kohautia tenuis (Bowdich) Mabb.
- Kosteletzkya buettneri Gürke
- Kosteletzkya grantii (Mast.) Garcke
- Kyllinga bulbosa P.Beauv.
- Kyllinga debilis C.B.Clarke
- Kyllinga echinata S.S.Hooper
- Kyllinga erecta Schumach.
- Kyllinga odorata Vahl
- Kyllinga pumila Michx.
- Kyllinga squamulata Thonn. ex Vahl
- Kyllinga tenuifolia Steud.
- Kyllingiella microcephala (Steud.) R.W.Haines & Lye
- Lablab purpureus (L.) Sweet.
- Lactuca inermis Forssk.
- Lactuca praevia C.D.Adams
- Lactuca sativa L.
- Lagarosiphon muscoides Harv.
- Lagenaria breviflora (Benth.) Roberty
- Lagenaria siceraria (Molina) Standl.
- Lagerstroemia indica L.
- Landolphia dulcis (Sabine) Pichon
- Landolphia heudelotii A.DC.
- Landolphia hirsuta (Hua) Pichon
- Landolphia owariensis P.Beauv.
- Lannea acida A.Rich.
- Lannea barteri (Oliv.) Engl.
- Lannea egregia Engl. & K.Krause
- Lannea fruticosa (Hochst. ex A.Rich.) Engl.
- Lannea microcarpa Engl. & K.Krause
- Lannea velutina A.Rich.
- Lantana camara L.
- Lantana ukambensis (Vatke) Verdc.
- Laportea aestuans (L.) Chew
- Launaea brunneri (Webb) Amin ex Boulos
- Launaea intybacea (Jacq.) Beauverd
- Launaea nana (Baker) Chiov.
- Launaea taraxacifolia (Willd.) Amin ex C.Jeffrey
- Lawsonia inermis L.
- Lecaniodiscus cupanioides Planch.
- Ledebouria sudanica (A.Chev.) Burg
- Leea guineensis G.Don
- Leersia drepanothrix Stapf
- Leersia hexandra Sw.
- Lemna aequinoctialis Welw.
- Leonotis nepetifolia (L.) R.Br.
- Lepidagathis alopecuroidea (Vahl) R.Br. ex Griseb.
- Lepidagathis anobrya Nees
- Lepidagathis capituliformis Benoist
- Lepidagathis collina (Endl.) Milne-Redh.
- Lepidagathis hamiltoniana Wall.
- Lepidagathis heudelotiana Nees
- Lepidagathis sericea Benoist
- Lepidium sativum L.
- Lepistemon owariense (P.Beauv.) Hallier f.
- Leptadenia arborea (Forssk.) Schweinf.
- Leptadenia hastata (Pers.) Decne.
- Leptadenia pyrotechnica (Forssk.) Decne.
- Leptochloa coerulescens Steud.
- Leptoderris brachyptera (Benth.) Dunn
- Leptothrium senegalense (Kunth) Clayton
- Leucaena leucocephala (Lam.) de Wit
- Leucas martinicensis (Jacq.) R.Br.
- Limeum diffusum (J.Gay) Schinz
- Limeum pterocarpum (J.Gay) Heimerl
- Limeum viscosum (J.Gay) Fenzl
- Limnophila barteri Skan
- Limnophila dasyantha (Engl. & Gilg) Skan
- Limnophila indica (L.) Druce
- Limnophyton obtusifolium (L.) Miq.
- Lindernia diffusa (L.) Wettst.
- Lindernia exilis Philcox
- Lindernia parviflora (Roxb.) Haines
- Lindernia schweinfurthii (Engl.) Dandy
- Lindernia senegalensis (Benth.) Skan
- Linzia nigritiana (Oliv. & Hiern) Isawumi
- Linzia purpurea (Sch.Bip. ex Walp.) Isawumi
- Lipocarpha albiceps Ridl.
- Lipocarpha atra Ridl.
- Lipocarpha chinensis (Osbeck) Kern
- Lipocarpha filiformis (Vahl) Kunth
- Lipocarpha gracilis Nees
- Lipocarpha kernii (Raymond) Goetgh.
- Lipocarpha prieuriana Steud.
- Lippia chevalieri Moldenke
- Lippia multiflora Moldenke
- Litogyne gariepina (DC.) Anderb.
- Lobelia djurensis Engl. & Diels
- Loeseneriella africana (Willd.) N.Hallé
- Lonchocarpus sericeus (Poir.) Kunth
- Lophira lanceolata Tiegh. ex Keay
- Loudetia annua (Stapf) C.E.Hubb.
- Loudetia arundinacea (A.Rich.) Steud.
- Loudetia flavida (Stapf) C.E.Hubb.
- Loudetia hordeiformis (Stapf) C.E.Hubb.
- Loudetia kagerensis (K.Schum.) C.E.Hubb. ex Hutch.
- Loudetia phragmitoides (Peter) C.E.Hubb.
- Loudetia simplex (Nees) C.E.Hubb.
- Loudetia togoensis (Pilg.) C.E.Hubb.
- Loudetiopsis ambiens (K.Schum.) Conert
- Loudetiopsis capillipes (C.E.Hubb.) Conert
- Loudetiopsis chrysothrix (Nees) Conert
- Loudetiopsis kerstingii (Pilg.) Conert
- Loudetiopsis pobeguinii (Jacq.-Fél.) Clayton
- Loudetiopsis scaettae (A.Camus) Clayton
- Loudetiopsis thoroldii (C.E.Hubb.) J.B.Phipps
- Loudetiopsis tristachyoides (Trin.) Conert
- Ludwigia abyssinica A.Rich.
- Ludwigia adscendens (L.) Hara
- Ludwigia africana (Brenan) Hara
- Ludwigia decurrens Walter
- Ludwigia erecta (L.) Hara
- Ludwigia hyssopifolia (G.Don) Exell
- Ludwigia leptocarpa (Nutt.) H.Hara
- Ludwigia octovalvis (Jacq.) P.H.Raven
- Ludwigia perennis L.
- Ludwigia senegalensis (DC.) Troch.
- Ludwigia stenorraphe (Brenan) Hara
- Luffa acutangula (L.) M.Roem.
- Luffa cylindrica (L.) M.Roem.
- Lycopersicon esculentum Mill.
- Lycopodiella affinis (Bory) Pic. Serm.
- Macaranga schweinfurthii Pax
- Macledium sessiliflorum (Harv.) S.Ortiz
- Macroptilium atropurpureum (DC.) Urb.
- Macroptilium lathyroides (L.) Urb.
- Macrosphyra longistyla (DC.) Hiern
- Macrotyloma africanum (R.Wilczek) Verdc.
- Macrotyloma biflorum (Schumach. & Thonn.) Hepper
- Macrotyloma geocarpum (Harms) Maréchal & Baudet
- Macrotyloma stenophyllum (Harms) Verdc.
- Maerua angolensis DC.
- Maerua crassifolia Forssk.
- Maerua de-waillyi Aubrév. & Pellegr.
- Maerua oblongifolia (Forssk.) A.Rich.
- Maerua pseudopetalosa (Gilg & Gilg-Ben.) DeWolf
- Malachra radiata (L.) L.
- Mallotus oppositifolius (Geiseler) Müll.Arg.
- Malvastrum coromandelianum (L.) Garcke
- Mangifera indica L.
- Manihot esculenta Crantz
- Manihot glaziovii Müll.Arg.
- Manilkara multinervis (Baker) Dubard
- Manilkara obovata (Sabine & G.Don) J.H.Hemsl.
- Maranthes polyandra (Benth.) Prance
- Marantochloa purpurea (Ridl.) Milne-Redh.
- Margaritaria discoidea (Baill.) G.L.Webster
- Mariscus cylindristachyus Steud.
- Mariscus flabelliformis Kunth
- Mariscus luridus C.B.Clarke
- Mariscus schweinfurthii Chiov.
- Mariscus squarrosus (L.) C.B.Clarke
- Mariscus sumatrensis (Retz.) J.Raynal
- Markhamia tomentosa (Benth.) K.Schum. ex Engl.
- Marsilea berhautii Tardieu
- Marsilea distorta A.Br.
- Marsilea gibba A.Br.
- Marsilea minuta L.
- Marsilea trichopoda A.Br.
- Martynia annua L.
- Melanthera abyssinica (Sch.Bip. ex A.Rich.) Vatke
- Melanthera elliptica O.Hoffm.
- Melanthera gambica Hutch. & Dalziel
- Melanthera rhombifolia O.Hoffm. & Muschl.
- Melanthera scandens (Schumach. & Thonn.) Roberty
- Melastomastrum afzelii (Hook.f.) A.Fern. & R.Fern.
- Melastomastrum capitatum (Vahl) A.Fern. & R.Fern.
- Melia azedarach L.
- Melicoccus bijugatus Jacq.
- Melinis repens (Willd.) Zizka
- Melinis tenuissima Stapf
- Melliniella micrantha Harms
- Melochia corchorifolia L.
- Melochia melissifolia Benth.
- Merremia aegyptia (L.) Urb.
- Merremia dissecta (Jacq.) Hallier f.
- Merremia emarginata (Burm.f.) Hallier f.
- Merremia hederacea (Burm.f.) Hallier f.
- Merremia kentrocaulos (C.B.Clarke) Hallier f.
- Merremia pinnata (Hochst. ex Choisy) Hallier f.
- Merremia pterygocaulos (Choisy) Hallier f.
- Merremia tridentata (L.) Hallier f.
- Merremia umbellata (L.) Hallier f.
- Mezoneuron benthamianum Baill.
- Micrargeria filiformis (Schumach. & Thonn.) Hutch. & Dalziel
- Microchloa indica (L.f.) P.Beauv.
- Microchloa kunthii Desv.
- Micrococca mercurialis (L.) Benth.
- Mikania chevalieri (C.D.Adams) W.C.Holmes & McDaniel
- Milicia excelsa (Welw.) C.C.Berg
- Mimosa pigra L.
- Mimosa pudica L.
- Mimusops kummel A.DC.
- Mirabilis jalapa L.
- Mitracarpus hirtus (L.) DC.
- Mitragyna inermis (Willd.) Kuntze
- Mollugo cerviana (L.) Ser. ex DC.
- Mollugo nudicaulis Lam.
- Momordica balsamina L.
- Momordica charantia L.
- Monanthotaxis parvifolia (Oliv.) Verdc.
- Monechma ciliatum (Jacq.) Milne-Redh.
- Monechma depauperatum (T.Anderson) C.B.Clarke
- Monechma ndellense (Lindau) J.Miège & Heine
- Monochoria brevipetiolata Verdc.
- Monocymbium ceresiiforme (Nees) Stapf
- Monotes kerstingii Gilg
- Monsonia senegalensis Guill. & Perr.
- Morelia senegalensis A.Rich.
- Moringa oleifera L.
- Mucuna poggei Taub.
- Mucuna pruriens (L.) DC.
- Multidentia pobeguinii (Hutch. & Dalziel) Bridson
- Murdannia simplex (Vahl) Brenan
- Musa x paradisiaca L.
- Mussaenda elegans Schumach. & Thonn.
- Myrianthus serratus (Trécul) Benth. & Hook.
- Najas baldwinii Horn
- Najas welwitschii Rendle
- Napoleonaea heudelotii A.Juss.
- Napoleonaea vogelii Hook. & Planch.
- Nelsonia canescens (Lam.) Spreng.
- Nelsonia smithii Oerst.
- Nemum spadiceum (Lam.) Desv. ex Ham.
- Neohyptis paniculata (Baker) J.K.Morton
- Neorautanenia mitis (A.Rich.) Verdc.
- Nephrolepis biserrata (Sw.) Schott
- Nephrolepis undulata (Afzel. ex Sw.) J. Sm.
- Nephthytis afzelii Schott
- Neptunia oleracea Lour.
- Nerium oleander L.
- Nervilia adolphi Schltr.
- Nervilia bicarinata (Blume) Schltr.
- Nervilia fuerstenbergiana Schltr.
- Nervilia kotschyi (Rchb.f.) Schltr.
- Nervilia simplex (Thouars) Schltr.
- Nesaea cordata Hiern
- Nesaea mossiensis A.Chev.
- Nesphostylis holosericea (Baker) Verdc.
- Neurotheca loeselioides (Spruce ex Progel) Baill.
- Newbouldia laevis (P.Beauv.) Seem. ex Bureau
- Nicotiana rustica L.
- Nicotiana tabacum L.
- Nothosaerva brachiata (L.) Wight
- Nymphaea lotus L.
- Nymphaea maculata Schumach. & Thonn.
- Nymphaea micrantha Guill. & Perr.
- Nymphoides ezannoi Berhaut
- Nymphoides indica (L.) Kuntze
- Ochna afzelii R.Br. ex Oliv.
- Ochna rhizomatosa (Tiegh.) Keay
- Ochna schweinfurthiana F.Hoffm.
- Ocimum americanum L.
- Ocimum basilicum L.
- Ocimum gratissimum L.
- Ocimum irvinei J.K.Morton
- Oeceoclades maculata (Lindl.) Lindl.
- Olax subscorpioidea Oliv.
- Oldenlandia affinis (Roem. & Schult.) DC.
- Oldenlandia capensis L.f.
- Oldenlandia corymbosa L.
- Oldenlandia herbacea (L.) Roxb.
- Oldenlandia lancifolia (Schumach.) DC.
- Olyra latifolia L.
- Omphalogonus calophyllus Baill.
- Oncoba spinosa Forssk.
- Ophioglossum costatum R.Br.
- Ophioglossum gomezianum Welw. ex A.Br.
- Ophioglossum reticulatum L.
- Opilia amentacea Roxb.
- Oplismenus burmannii (Retz.) P.Beauv.
- Oplismenus hirtellus (L.) P.Beauv.
- Orbea decaisneana (Lehm.) Bruyns
- Ornithogalum viride (L.) J.C.Manning & Goldblatt
- Oropetium aristatum (Stapf) Pilg.
- Orthosiphon pallidus Royle ex Benth.
- Orthosiphon rubicundus (D.Don) Benth.
- Oryza barthii A.Chev.
- Oryza glaberrima Steud.
- Oryza longistaminata A.Chev. & Roehr.
- Oryza sativa L.
- Osbeckia tubulosa Sm.
- Osmunda regalis L.
- Ottelia ulvifolia (Planch.) Walp.
- Oxalis corniculata L.
- Oxyanthus racemosus (Schum. & Thonn.) Keay
- Oxycaryum cubense (Poepp. & Kunth) Lye
- Oxystelma bornouense R.Br.
- Oxytenanthera abyssinica (A.Rich.) Munro
- Ozoroa obovata (Oliv.) R.Fern. & A.Fern.
- Ozoroa pulcherrima (Schweinf.) R.Fern. & A.Fern.
- Pachycarpus lineolatus (Decne.) Bullock
- Pancratium tenuifolium Hochst. ex A.Rich.
- Pancratium trianthum Herb.
- Pandanus brevifrugalis Huynh
- Pandiaka angustifolia (Vahl) Hepper
- Pandiaka involucrata (Moq.) B.D.Jacks.
- Panicum afzelii Sw.
- Panicum anabaptistum Steud.
- Panicum antidotale Retz.
- Panicum brazzavillense Franch.
- Panicum brevifolium L.
- Panicum coloratum L.
- Panicum congoense Franch.
- Panicum dregeanum Nees
- Panicum fluviicola Steud.
- Panicum griffonii Franch.
- Panicum humile Nees ex Steud.
- Panicum laetum Kunth
- Panicum laxum Sw.
- Panicum maximum Jacq.
- Panicum nervatum (Franch.) Stapf
- Panicum nigerense Hitchc.
- Panicum pansum Rendle
- Panicum parvifolium Lam.
- Panicum phragmitoides Stapf
- Panicum pilgeri Mez
- Panicum praealtum Afzel. ex Sw.
- Panicum subalbidum Kunth
- Panicum tenellum Lam.
- Panicum turgidum Forssk.
- Parahyparrhenia annua (Hack.) Clayton
- Parahyparrhenia perennis Clayton
- Paratheria prostrata Griseb.
- Parinari congensis Didr.
- Parinari curatellifolia Planch. ex Benth.
- Parinari excelsa Sabine
- Parkia biglobosa (Jacq.) R.Br. ex G.Don
- Parkinsonia aculeata L.
- Paspalidium geminatum (Forssk.) Stapf
- Paspalum conjugatum P.J.Bergius
- Paspalum scrobiculatum L.
- Paspalum vaginatum Sw.
- Passiflora edulis Sims
- Passiflora foetida L.
- Paullinia pinnata L.
- Pavetta corymbosa (DC.) F.N.Williams
- Pavetta crassipes K.Schum.
- Pavetta lasioclada (K.Krause) Mildbr. ex Bremek.
- Pavetta oblongifolia (Hiern) Bremek.
- Pavonia senegalensis (Cav.) Leistner
- Pavonia triloba Guill. & Perr.
- Peltophorum pterocarpum (DC.) K.Heyne
- Pennisetum glaucum (L.) R.Br.
- Pennisetum hordeoides (Lam.) Steud.
- Pennisetum pedicellatum Trin.
- Pennisetum polystachion (L.) Schult.
- Pennisetum setigerum (Vahl) Wipff
- Pennisetum sieberianum (Schltr.) Stapf & C.E.Hubb.
- Pennisetum unisetum (Nees) Benth.
- Pennisetum violaceum (Lam.) Rich.
- Pentadesma butyracea Sabine
- Pentanema indicum (L.) Y.Ling
- Pentatropis nivalis (J.F.Gmel.) D.V.Field & J.R.I.Wood
- Peperomia pellucida H.B. & K.
- Pergularia daemia (Forssk.) Chiov.
- Pergularia tomentosa L.
- Pericopsis laxiflora (Benth.) Meeuwen
- Periploca nigrescens Afzel.
- Perotis indica (L.) Kuntze
- Perotis patens Gand.
- Perotis scabra Willd. ex Trin.
- Persea americana Mill.
- Persicaria decipiens (R.Br.) K.L.Wilson
- Persicaria limbata (Meisn.) H.Hara
- Persicaria madagascariensis (Meisn.) S.Ortíz & Paiva
- Persicaria senegalensis (Meisn.) Soják
- Phaseolus vulgaris L.
- Phaulopsis barteri T.Anderson
- Phaulopsis ciliata (Willd.) Hepper
- Phaulopsis imbricata (Forssk.) Sweet
- Philenoptera cyanescens (Schumach. & Thonn.) Roberty
- Philenoptera laxiflora (Guill. & Perr.) Roberty
- Phoenix dactylifera L.
- Phoenix reclinata Jacq.
- Phragmites australis (Cav.) Steud.
- Phragmites karka (Retz.) Steud.
- Phyla nodiflora (L.) Greene
- Phyllanthus alpestris Beille
- Phyllanthus amarus Schumach. & Thonn.
- Phyllanthus beillei Hutch.
- Phyllanthus fraternus G.L.Webster
- Phyllanthus maderaspatensis L.
- Phyllanthus muellerianus (Kuntze) Exell
- Phyllanthus pentandrus Schumach. & Thonn.
- Phyllanthus reticulatus Poir.
- Phyllanthus rotundifolius Klein ex Willd.
- Phyllanthus sublanatus Schumach. & Thonn.
- Phyllanthus welwitschianus Müll.Arg.
- Physalis angulata L.
- Physalis lagascae Roem. & Schult.
- Piliostigma reticulatum (DC.) Hochst.
- Piliostigma thonningii (Schumach.) Milne-Redh.
- Pistia stratiotes L.
- Pithecellobium dulce (Roxb.) Benth.
- Pityrogramma calomelanos (L.) Link
- Platostoma africanum P.Beauv.
- Platycoryne paludosa (Lindl.) Rolfe
- Plectranthus bojeri (Benth.) Hedge
- Plectranthus chevalieri (Briq.) B.J.Pollard & A.J.Paton
- Plectranthus esculentus N.E.Br.
- Plectranthus gracillimus (T.C.E.Fr.) Hutch. & Dandy
- Plectranthus monostachyus (P.Beauv.) B.J.Pollard
- Pluchea ovalis (Pers.) DC.
- Plumbago auriculata Lam.
- Plumbago zeylanica L.
- Plumeria alba L.
- Plumeria rubra L.
- Polycarpaea billei J.-P.Lebrun
- Polycarpaea corymbosa (L.) Lam.
- Polycarpaea eriantha Hochst. ex A.Rich.
- Polycarpaea linearifolia (DC.) DC.
- Polycarpaea tenuifolia (Willd.) DC.
- Polycarpon prostratum (Forssk.) Asch. & Schweinf.
- Polygala acicularis Oliv.
- Polygala arenaria Willd.
- Polygala atacorensis Jacq.-Fél.
- Polygala baikiei Chodat
- Polygala butyracea Heckel
- Polygala capillaris E.Mey. ex Harv.
- Polygala erioptera DC.
- Polygala guineensis Willd.
- Polygala irregularis Boiss.
- Polygala multiflora Poir.
- Polygala petitiana A.Rich.
- Polygonum plebeium R.Br.
- Polygonum pulchrum Blume
- Polystachya golungensis Rchb.f.
- Porphyrostemma chevalieri (O.Hoffm.) Hutch. & Dalziel
- Portulaca foliosa Ker Gawl.
- Portulaca grandiflora Hook.
- Portulaca oleracea L.
- Portulaca quadrifida L.
- Potamogeton octandrus Poir.
- Potamogeton schweinfurthii A.Benn.
- Pouchetia africana A.Rich. ex DC.
- Pouteria alnifolia (Baker) Roberty
- Pouzolzia guineensis Benth.
- Premna lucens A.Chev.
- Prosopis africana (Guill. & Perr.) Taub.
- Prosopis chilensis (Molina) Stuntz
- Prosopis juliflora (Sw.) DC.
- Protea madiensis Oliv.
- Pseudarthria fagifolia Baker
- Pseudarthria hookeri Wight & Arn.
- Pseudechinolaena polystachya (Kunth) Stapf
- Pseudocedrela kotschyi (Schweinf.) Harms
- Pseudoconyza viscosa (Mill.) D'Arcy
- Pseudognaphalium luteoalbum (L.) Hilliard & B.L.Burtt
- Pseudospondias microcarpa (A.Rich.) Engl.
- Psidium guajava L.
- Psophocarpus monophyllus Harms
- Psophocarpus palustris Desv.
- Psorospermum corymbiferum Hochr.
- Psorospermum febrifugum Spach
- Psorospermum glaberrimum Hochr.
- Psorospermum senegalense Spach
- Psychotria psychotrioides (DC.) Roberty
- Psychotria vogeliana Benth.
- Psydrax acutiflora (Hiern) Bridson
- Psydrax horizontalis (Schumach.) Bridson
- Psydrax parviflora (Afzel.) Bridson
- Psydrax subcordata (DC.) Bridson
- Pteleopsis habeensis Aubrév. ex Keay
- Pteleopsis suberosa Engl. & Diels
- Pterocarpus erinaceus Poir.
- Pterocarpus lucens Lepr. ex Guill. & Perr.
- Pterocarpus santalinoides DC.
- Pulicaria incisa (Lam.) DC.
- Pulicaria undulata (L.) C.A.Mey.
- Punica granatum L.
- Pupalia lappacea (L.) A.Juss.
- Pycnocycla ledermannii H.Wolff
- Pycreus acuticarinatus (Kük.) Cherm.
- Pycreus aethiops (Welw. ex Ridl.) C.B.Clarke
- Pycreus capillifolius (A.Rich.) C.B.Clarke
- Pycreus flavescens (L.) P.Beauv. ex Rchb.
- Pycreus lanceolatus (Poir.) C.B.Clarke
- Pycreus macrostachyos (Lam.) J.Raynal
- Pycreus melas (Ridl.) C.B.Clarke
- Pycreus mundtii Nees
- Pycreus pseudodiaphanus S.S.Hooper
- Pycreus pumilus (L.) Domin
- Pycreus smithianus (Ridl.) C.B.Clarke
- Pycreus unioloides (R.Br.) Urb.
- Quassia undulata (Guill. & Perr.) F.Dietr.
- Raphia sudanica A.Chev.
- Raphionacme brownii Scott-Elliot
- Raphionacme splendens Schlechter
- Raphionacme vignei Bruce
- Rauvolfia vomitoria Afzel.
- Ravenala madagascariensis Sonn.
- Requienia obcordata (Lam. ex Poir.) DC.
- Rhamphicarpa fistulosa (Hochst.) Benth.
- Rhaphiostylis beninensis Planch.
- Rhus crenulata A.Rich.
- Rhus longipes Engl.
- Rhynchosia albae-pauli Berhaut
- Rhynchosia buettneri Harms
- Rhynchosia densiflora (Roth) DC.
- Rhynchosia hirta (Andrews) Meikle & Verdc.
- Rhynchosia minima (L.) DC.
- Rhynchosia nyasica Baker
- Rhynchosia procurrens (Hiern) K.Schum.
- Rhynchosia pycnostachya (DC.) Meikle
- Rhynchosia resinosa (Hochst. ex A.Rich.) Baker
- Rhynchosia sublobata (Schumach. & Thonn.) Meikle
- Rhynchospora candida (Nees) Boeckeler
- Rhynchospora corymbosa (L.) Britton
- Rhynchospora eximia (Nees) Boeckeler
- Rhynchospora gracillima Thwaites
- Rhynchospora perrieri Cherm.
- Rhynchospora triflora Vahl
- Rhytachne furtiva Clayton
- Rhytachne rottboellioides Desv.
- Rhytachne triaristata (Steud.) Stapf
- Richardia brasiliensis Gomes
- Ricinus communis L.
- Ritchiea capparoides (Andrews) Britten
- Ritchiea erecta Hook.f.
- Ritchiea reflexa (Thonn.) Gilg & Gilg-Ben.
- Rogeria adenophylla J.Gay ex Delile
- Rotala elatinoides (DC.) Hiern
- Rotala mexicana Cham. & Schltdl.
- Rotala stagnina Hiern
- Rotala tenella (Guill. & Perr.) Hiern
- Rotala welwitschii Exell
- Rotheca alata (Gürke) Verdc.
- Rothia hirsuta (Guill. & Perr.) Baker
- Rothmannia longiflora Salisb.
- Rottboellia cochinchinensis (Lour.) Clayton
- Rotula aquatica Lour.
- Rourea coccinea (Thonn. ex Schumach.) Benth.
- Rourea minor (Gaertn.) Alston
- Ruellia patula Jacq.
- Ruellia praetermissa Schweinf. ex Lindau
- Rutidea parviflora DC.
- Rytigynia senegalensis Blume
- Rytigynia umbellulata (Hiern) Robyns
- Saba comorensis (Bojer ex A.DC.) Pichon
- Saba senegalensis (A.DC.) Pichon
- Saba thompsonii (A.Chev.) Pichon
- Sabicea brevipes Wernham
- Sabicea venosa Benth.
- Saccharum officinarum L.
- Saccharum spontaneum L.
- Sacciolepis africana C.E.Hubb. & Snowden
- Sacciolepis chevalieri Stapf
- Sacciolepis ciliocincta (Pilg.) Stapf
- Sacciolepis cymbiandra Stapf
- Sacciolepis indica (L.) Chase
- Sacciolepis micrococca Mez
- Sagittaria guayanensis Humb., Bonpl. & Kunth
- Salacia owabiensis Hoyle
- Salacia pallescens Oliv.
- Salacia pyriformis (Sabine) Steud.
- Salacia stuhlmanniana Loes.
- Salvadora persica L.
- Sansevieria liberica Gérôme & Labroy
- Sansevieria longiflora Sims
- Sansevieria senegambica Baker
- Sarcocephalus latifolius (Sm.) E.A.Bruce
- Sarcocephalus pobeguinii Pobeg.
- Sarcostemma viminale (L.) R.Br.
- Sauvagesia erecta L.
- Scadoxus multiflorus (Martyn) Raf.
- Schizachyrium brevifolium (Sw.) Nees ex Büse
- Schizachyrium exile (Hochst.) Pilg.
- Schizachyrium nodulosum (Hack.) Stapf
- Schizachyrium penicillatum Jacq.-Fél.
- Schizachyrium platyphyllum (Franch.) Stapf
- Schizachyrium ruderale Clayton
- Schizachyrium rupestre (K.Schum.) Stapf
- Schizachyrium sanguineum (Retz.) Alston
- Schizachyrium schweinfurthii (Hack.) Stapf
- Schizachyrium urceolatum (Hack.) Stapf
- Schoenefeldia gracilis Kunth
- Schoenoplectiella juncea (Willd.) Lye
- Schoenoplectiella lateriflora (J.F.Gmel.) Lye
- Schoenoplectiella roylei (Nees) Lye
- Schoenoplectiella senegalensis (Hochst. ex Steud.) Lye
- Schoenoplectus corymbosus (Roth ex Roem. & Schult.) J.Raynal
- Schoenoplectus litoralis (Schrad.) Palla
- Schoenoplectus subulatus (Vahl) Lye
- Schouwia purpurea (Forssk.) Schweinf.
- Schultesia stenophylla Mart.
- Schwenckia americana L.
- Scleria achtenii De Wild.
- Scleria bulbifera Hochst. ex A.Rich.
- Scleria depressa (C.B.Clarke) Nelmes
- Scleria distans Poir.
- Scleria foliosa Hochst. ex A.Rich.
- Scleria lacustris C.Wright
- Scleria lagoensis Boeckeler
- Scleria lithosperma (L.) Sw.
- Scleria melaleuca Rchb. ex Schltr. & Cham.
- Scleria melanotricha Hochst. ex A.Rich.
- Scleria mikawana Makino
- Scleria naumanniana Boeckeler
- Scleria pergracilis (Nees) Kunth
- Scleria racemosa Poir.
- Scleria sphaerocarpa (E.A.Rob.) Napper
- Scleria tessellata Willd.
- Sclerocarpus africanus Jacq. ex Murray
- Sclerocarya birrea (A.Rich.) Hochst.
- Scoparia dulcis L.
- Sebastiania chamaelea (L.) Müll.Arg.
- Secamone afzelii (Schult.) K.Schum.
- Securidaca longipedunculata Fresen.
- Sehima ischaemoides Forssk.
- Selaginella protensa Alston
- Senegalia ataxacantha DC.
- Senegalia gourmaensis A.Chev.
- Senegalia laeta R.Br. ex Benth.
- Senegalia macrostachya Rchb. ex DC.
- Senegalia polyacantha Willd.
- Senegalia senegal (L.) Willd.
- Senna alata (L.) Roxb.
- Senna hirsuta L.
- Senna italica Mill.
- Senna obtusifolia L.
- Senna occidentalis L.
- Senna podocarpa Guill. & Perr.
- Senna siamea Lam.
- Senna singueana Delile
- Senna surattensis Burm.f.
- Sericanthe chevalieri (K.Krause) Robbr.
- Sesamum alatum Thonn.
- Sesamum indicum L.
- Sesamum radiatum Schumach. & Thonn.
- Sesbania bispinosa (Jacq.) W.Wight
- Sesbania dalzielii E.Phillips & Hutch.
- Sesbania leptocarpa DC.
- Sesbania pachycarpa DC.
- Sesbania rostrata Bremek. & Oberm.
- Sesbania sesban (L.) Merr.
- Sesbania sudanica J.B.Gillett
- Sesuvium hydaspicum (Edgew.) Gonç.
- Setaria barbata (Lam.) Kunth
- Setaria longiseta P.Beauv.
- Setaria pumila (Poir.) Roem. & Schult.
- Setaria sphacelata (Schumach.) Stapf & C.E.Hubb. ex M.B.Moss
- Setaria verticillata (L.) P.Beauv.
- Shirakiopsis elliptica (Hochst.) Esser
- Sida acuta Burm.f.
- Sida alba L.
- Sida cordifolia L.
- Sida javensis Cav.
- Sida linifolia Juss. ex Cav.
- Sida ovata Forssk.
- Sida rhombifolia L.
- Sida urens L.
- Siphonochilus aethiopicus (Schweinf.) B.L.Burtt
- Smeathmannia pubescens Sol. ex R.Br.
- Smilax anceps Willd.
- Solanum aculeatissimum Jacq.
- Solanum aethiopicum L.
- Solanum cerasiferum Dunal
- Solanum dasyphyllum Schumach. & Thonn.
- Solanum incanum L.
- Solanum melongena L.
- Solanum nigrum L.
- Solanum torvum Sw.
- Solanum tuberosum L.
- Solenostemon rotundifolius (Poir.) J.K.Morton
- Sonchus asper (L.) Hill
- Sonchus oleraceus L.
- Sopubia parviflora Engl.
- Sopubia ramosa (Hochst.) Hochst.
- Sopubia simplex (Hochst.) Hochst.
- Sorghastrum bipennatum (Hack.) Pilg.
- Sorghastrum stipoides (Kunth) Nash
- Sorghum arundinaceum (Desv.) Stapf
- Sorghum bicolor (L.) Moench
- Sorghum purpureo-sericeum (Hochst. ex A.Rich.) Asch. & Schweinf.
- Sorindeia juglandifolia (A.Rich.) Planch. ex Oliv.
- Spermacoce chaetocephala DC.
- Spermacoce filifolia (Schumach. & Thonn.) J.-P.Lebrun & Stork
- Spermacoce hepperana Verdc.
- Spermacoce octodon (Hepper) J.-P.Lebrun & Stork
- Spermacoce pusilla Wall.
- Spermacoce quadrisulcata (Bremek.) Verdc.
- Spermacoce radiata (DC.) Hiern
- Spermacoce ruelliae DC.
- Spermacoce spermacocina (K.Schum.) Bridson & Puff
- Spermacoce stachydea DC.
- Spermacoce verticillata L.
- Sphaeranthus angustifolius DC.
- Sphaeranthus senegalensis DC.
- Sphaerocodon afrum (Meisn.) Schltr.
- Sphenoclea zeylanica Gaertn.
- Sphenostylis schweinfurthii Harms
- Sphenostylis stenocarpa (Hochst. ex A.Rich.) Harms
- Spigelia anthelmia L.
- Spondianthus preussii Engl.
- Spondias mombin L.
- Sporobolus festivus Hochst. ex A.Rich.
- Sporobolus helvolus (Trin.) T.Durand & Schinz
- Sporobolus microprotus Stapf
- Sporobolus paniculatus (Trin.) T.Durand & Schinz
- Sporobolus pectinellus Mez
- Sporobolus pellucidus Hochst.
- Sporobolus pilifer (Trin.) Kunth
- Sporobolus pyramidalis P.Beauv.
- Sporobolus sanguineus Rendle
- Sporobolus stolzii Mez
- Sporobolus subglobosus A.Chev.
- Stachytarpheta indica (L.) Vahl
- Stapfochloa lamproparia (Stapf) H.Scholz
- Steganotaenia araliacea Hochst.
- Stemodia serrata Benth.
- Stenotaphrum dimidiatum (L.) Brongn.
- Stenotaphrum secundatum (Walter) Kuntze
- Sterculia setigera Delile
- Sterculia tragacantha Lindl.
- Stereospermum kunthianum Cham.
- Stomatanthes africanus (Oliv. & Hiern) R.M.King & H.Rob.
- Striga asiatica (L.) Kuntze
- Striga aspera (Willd.) Benth.
- Striga baumannii Engl.
- Striga bilabiata (Thunb.) Kuntze
- Striga brachycalyx Engl. ex Skan
- Striga forbesii Benth.
- Striga gesnerioides (Willd.) Vatke
- Striga hermonthica (Delile) Benth.
- Striga klingii (Engl.) Skan
- Striga macrantha (Benth.) Benth.
- Striga passargei Engl.
- Strophanthus gratus (Wall. & Hook.) Baill.
- Strophanthus hispidus DC.
- Strophanthus sarmentosus DC.
- Struchium sparganophorum (L.) Kuntze
- Strychnos congolana Gilg
- Strychnos cuminodora Leeuwenberg
- Strychnos innocua Delile
- Strychnos spinosa Lam.
- Strychnos usambarensis Gilg
- Stylochaeton hypogaeus Lepr.
- Stylochaeton lancifolius Kotschy & Peyr.
- Stylosanthes erecta P.Beauv.
- Stylosanthes fruticosa (Retz.) Alston
- Stylosanthes guianensis (Aubl.) Sw.
- Stylosanthes hamata L.
- Synedrella nodiflora Gaertn.
- Synsepalum brevipes (Baker) T.D.Penn.
- Synsepalum pobeguinianum (Pierre ex Lecomte) Aké Assi & L.Gaut.
- Syzygium guineense (Willd.) DC.
- Tacazzea apiculata Oliv.
- Tacca leontopetaloides (L.) Kuntze
- Talinum triangulare (Jacq.) Willd.
- Tamarindus indica L.
- Tapinanthus bangwensis (Engl. & K.Krause) Danser
- Tapinanthus globiferus (A.Rich.) Tiegh.
- Tapinanthus ophiodes (Sprague) Danser
- Tarenna pavettoides (Harv.) Sim
- Tarenna thomasii Hutch. & Dalziel
- Tecoma stans (L.) Juss. ex Kunth
- Tectona grandis L.f.
- Telosma africana (N.E.Br.) N.E.Br.
- Tephrosia berhautiana Lescot
- Tephrosia bracteolata Guill. & Perr.
- Tephrosia deflexa Baker
- Tephrosia elegans Schumach.
- Tephrosia gracilipes Guill. & Perr.
- Tephrosia humilis Guill. & Perr.
- Tephrosia lathyroides Guill. & Perr.
- Tephrosia lebrunii Cronquist
- Tephrosia letestui Tisser.
- Tephrosia linearis (Willd.) Pers.
- Tephrosia lupinifolia DC.
- Tephrosia mossiensis A.Chev.
- Tephrosia nana Schweinf.
- Tephrosia pedicellata Baker
- Tephrosia platycarpa Guill. & Perr.
- Tephrosia purpurea (L.) Pers.
- Tephrosia sylviae Berhaut
- Tephrosia uniflora Pers.
- Tephrosia villosa (L.) Pers.
- Teramnus buettneri (Harms) Baker f.
- Teramnus labialis (L.f.) Spreng.
- Terminalia albida Scott-Elliot
- Terminalia avicennioides Guill. & Perr.
- Terminalia catappa L.
- Terminalia ivorensis A.Chev.
- Terminalia laxiflora Engl. & Diels
- Terminalia macroptera Guill. & Perr.
- Terminalia mantaly H.Perrier
- Terminalia mollis M.A.Lawson
- Terminalia schimperiana Hochst.
- Tetracera alnifolia Willd.
- Tetracera potatoria Afzel. ex G.Don
- Tetrapogon cenchriformis (A.Rich.) Clayton
- Thalia geniculata L.
- Thaumatococcus daniellii (Bennet) Benth.
- Thelepogon elegans Roth
- Thelypteris dentata (Forsk.) E. St. John
- Thelypteris striata (Schumach.) Schelpe
- Themeda triandra Forssk.
- Thesium viride A.W.Hill
- Thespesia populneoides (Roxb.) Kostel.
- Thonningia sanguinea Vahl
- Thunbergia erecta (Benth.) T.Anderson
- Tinnea aethiopica Kotschy ex Hook.f.
- Tinnea barteri Gürke
- Tinospora bakis (A.Rich.) Miers
- Trachypogon spicatus (L.f.) Kuntze
- Tragia senegalensis Müll.Arg.
- Tragia tenuifolia Benth.
- Tragia vogelii Keay
- Tragia volubilis L.
- Tragia wildemanii Beille
- Tragus berteronianus Schult.
- Tragus racemosus (L.) All.
- Trapa natans L.
- Trema orientalis (L.) Blume
- Trianthema portulacastrum L.
- Tribulus terrestris L.
- Tricalysia okelensis Hiern
- Trichilia emetica Vahl
- Trichoneura mollis (Kunth) Ekman
- Tricliceras pilosum (Willd.) R.Fern.
- Triclisia patens Oliv.
- Triclisia subcordata Oliv.
- Tridax procumbens L.
- Tripogon minimus (A.Rich.) Steud.
- Tristachya superba (De Not.) Schweinf. & Asch.
- Tristemma mauritianum J.F.Gmel.
- Tristicha trifaria (Bory ex Willd.) Spreng.
- Triumfetta lepidota K.Schum.
- Triumfetta pentandra A.Rich.
- Triumfetta rhomboidea Jacq.
- Triumfetta setulosa Mast.
- Trochomeria macrocarpa (Sond.) Hook.f.
- Tylophora oculata N.E.Br.
- Typha domingensis Pers.
- Uapaca heudelotii Baill.
- Uapaca togoensis Pax
- Uncaria africana G.Don
- Uncaria talbotii Wernham
- Uraria picta (Jacq.) DC.
- Urelytrum annuum Stapf
- Urelytrum muricatum C.E.Hubb.
- Urena lobata L.
- Urochloa brizantha (A.Rich.) Stapf
- Urochloa comata (Hochst. ex A.Rich.) Sosef
- Urochloa falcifera (Trin.) Stapf
- Urochloa jubata (Fig. & De Not.) Sosef
- Urochloa ruziziensis (R.Germ. & C.M.Evrard) Crins
- Urochloa trichopus (Hochst.) Stapf
- Usteria guineensis Willd.
- Utricularia arenaria A.DC.
- Utricularia foliosa L.
- Utricularia gibba L.
- Utricularia inflexa Forssk.
- Utricularia micropetala Sm.
- Utricularia pubescens Sm.
- Utricularia reflexa Oliv.
- Utricularia rigida Benj.
- Utricularia simulans Pilger
- Utricularia spiralis Sm.
- Utricularia stellaris L.f.
- Utricularia subulata L.
- Uvaria chamae P.Beauv.
- Vachellia ehrenbergiana Hayne
- Vachellia gerrardi Benth.
- Vachellia nilotica (L.) Willd. ex Delile
- Vachellia seyal Delile
- Vachellia sieberiana DC.
- Vachellia tortilis (Forssk.) Hayne
- Vahlia dichotoma (Murray) Kuntze
- Vahlia digyna (Retz.) Kuntze
- Vahlia geminiflora (Delile) Bridson
- Vangueriella spinosa (Schumach. & Thonn.) Verdc.
- Vepris heterophylla (Engl.) Letouzey
- Vernonia adoensis Sch.Bip. ex Walp.
- Vernonia ambigua Kotschy & Peyr.
- Vernonia amygdalina Delile
- Vernonia chapmanii C.D.Adams
- Vernonia chthonocephala O.Hoffm.
- Vernonia colorata (Willd.) Drake
- Vernonia galamensis (Cass.) Less.
- Vernonia gerberiformis Oliv. & Hiern
- Vernonia guineensis Benth.
- Vernonia perrottetii Sch.Bip. ex Walp.
- Vernonia plumbaginifolia Fenzl ex Oliv. & Hiern
- Vernonia pumila Kotschy & Peyr.
- Vernonia smithiana Less.
- Vernoniastrum camporum (A.Chev.) Isawumi
- Vetiveria fulvibarbis (Trin.) Stapf
- Vigna adenantha (G.Mey.) Maréchal & Mascherpa & Stainier
- Vigna filicaulis Hepper
- Vigna gracilis (Guill. & Perr.) Hook.f.
- Vigna heterophylla A.Rich.
- Vigna kirkii (Baker) J.B.Gillett
- Vigna luteola (Jacq.) Benth.
- Vigna parkeri Baker
- Vigna racemosa (G.Don) Hutch. & Dalziel
- Vigna radiata (L.) R.Wilczek
- Vigna reticulata Hook.f.
- Vigna stenophylla Harms
- Vigna subterranea (L.) Verdc.
- Vigna unguiculata (L.) Walp.
- Vigna venulosa Baker
- Vigna vexillata (L.) A.Rich.
- Vincetoxicum oblongum (N.E.Br.) Meve & Liede
- Virectaria multiflora (Sm.) Bremek.
- Vismia guineensis (L.) Choisy
- Vitellaria paradoxa C.F.Gaertn.
- Vitex chrysocarpa Planch. ex Benth.
- Vitex doniana Sweet
- Vitex madiensis Oliv.
- Voacanga africana Stapf
- Voacanga thouarsii Roem. & Schult.
- Vossia cuspidata (Roxb.) Griff.
- Wahlenbergia hirsuta (Edgew.) Tuyn
- Wahlenbergia lobelioides (L.f.) Link
- Wahlenbergia perrottetii (A.DC.) Thulin
- Waltheria indica L.
- Waltheria lanceolata R.Br. ex Mast.
- Warneckea fascicularis (Planch. ex Benth.) Jacq.-Fél.
- Wissadula rostrata (Schumach.) Hook.f.
- Xanthosoma sagittifolium (L.) Schott
- Xeroderris stuhlmannii (Taub.) Mendonça & E.C.Sousa
- Ximenia americana L.
- Xylopia acutiflora (Dunal) A.Rich.
- Xylopia aethiopica (Dunal) A.Rich.
- Xylopia elliotii Engl. & Diels
- Xyris barteri N.E.Br.
- Xyris decipiens N.E.Br.
- Xyris straminea L.A.Nilsson
- Xysmalobium heudelotianum Decne.
- Zaleya pentandra (L.) C.Jeffrey
- Zanha golungensis Hiern
- Zanthoxylum leprieurii Guill. & Perr.
- Zanthoxylum zanthoxyloides (Lam.) Zepern. & Timler
- Zea mays L.
- Zehneria capillacea (Schumach.) C.Jeffrey
- Zehneria hallii C.Jeffrey
- Zehneria scabra (L.f.) Sond.
- Zehneria thwaitesii (Schweinf.) C.Jeffrey
- Ziziphus abyssinica A.Rich.
- Ziziphus lotus (L.) Lam.
- Ziziphus mauritiana Lam.
- Ziziphus mucronata Willd.
- Ziziphus spina-christi (L.) Desf.
- Zornia durumuensis De Wild.
- Zornia glochidiata Rchb. ex DC.
- Zoysia matrella (L.) Merr.
- Zoysia tenuifolia Willd. ex Thiele
- Zygotritonia crocea Stapf

== See also ==
- Wildlife of Burkina Faso
