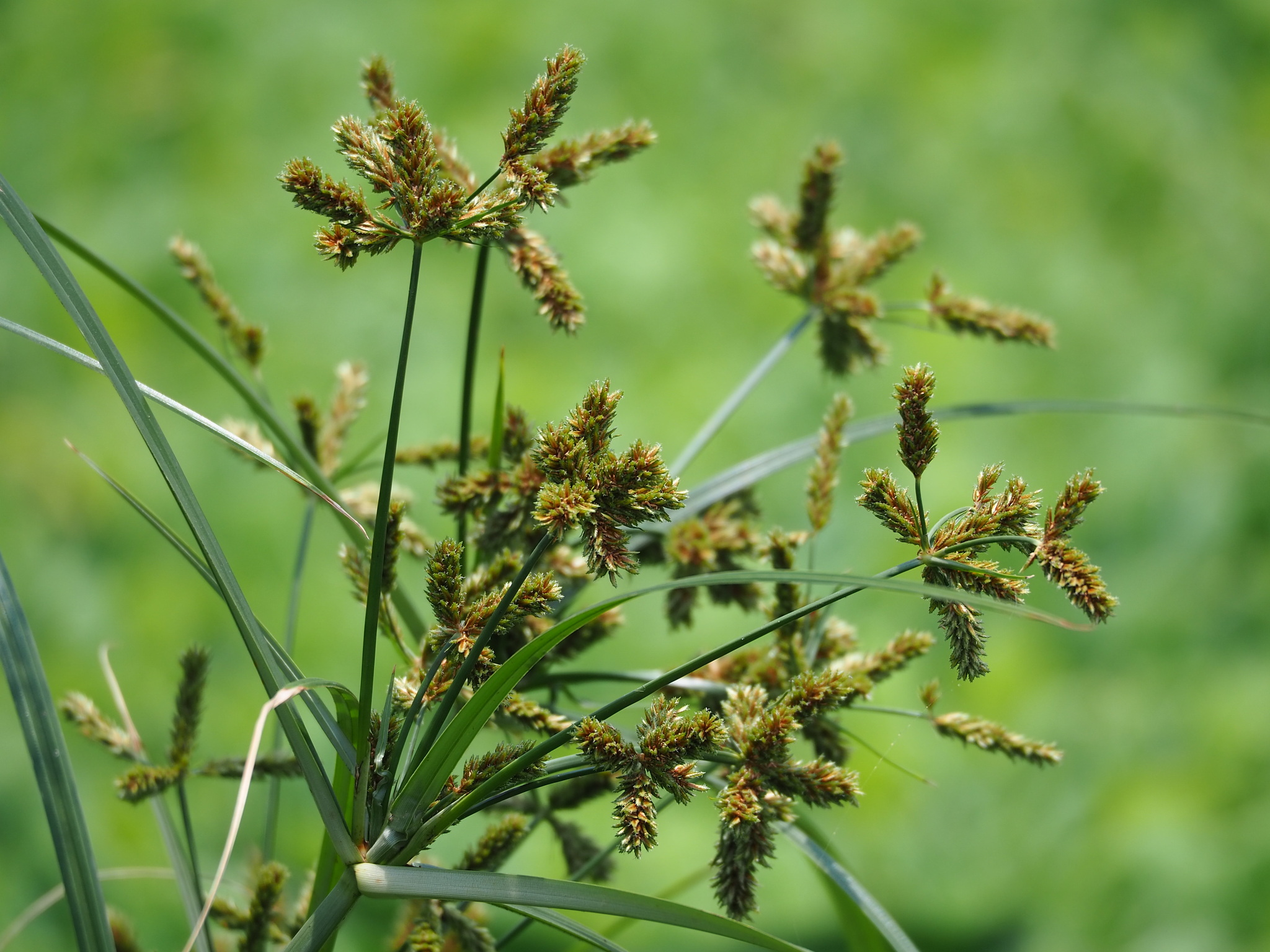

Conservation status
- Least Concern (IUCN 3.1)

Scientific classification
- Kingdom: Plantae
- Clade: Tracheophytes
- Clade: Angiosperms
- Clade: Monocots
- Clade: Commelinids
- Order: Poales
- Family: Cyperaceae
- Genus: Cyperus
- Species: C. imbricatus

Binomial name
- Cyperus imbricatus Retz., 1788

= Cyperus imbricatus =

Species of sedge

Cyperus imbricatus, also known as the shingle flatsedge, is a species of sedge that is native to sub-tropical and tropical areas of the world.

The sedge is a rhizomatous, robust and perennial sedge with a natural distribution through pantropical areas that is also known as an agricultural and environmental weed.

== See also ==
- List of Cyperus species
