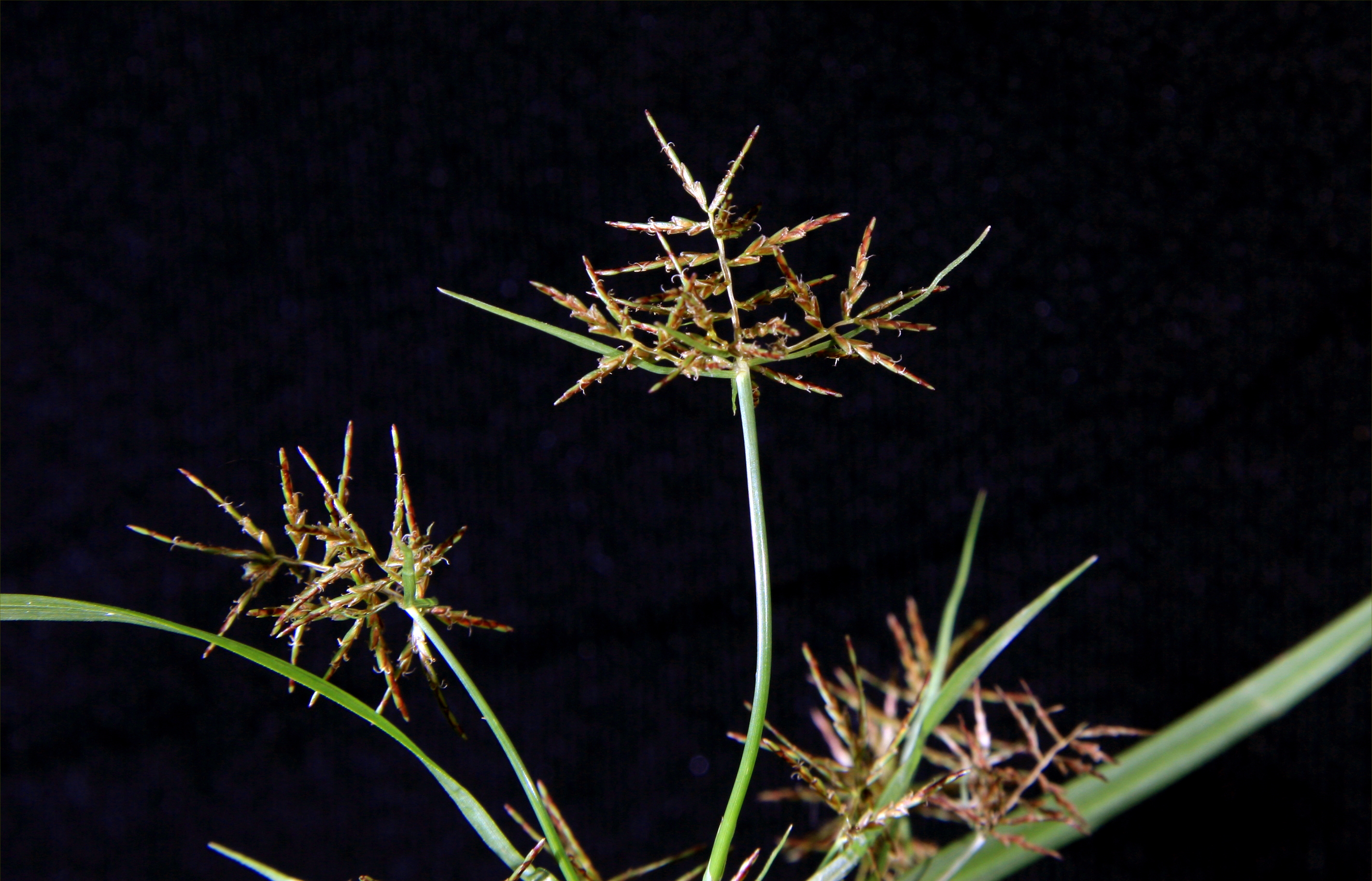

Conservation status
- Least Concern (IUCN 3.1)

Scientific classification
- Kingdom: Plantae
- Clade: Tracheophytes
- Clade: Angiosperms
- Clade: Monocots
- Clade: Commelinids
- Order: Poales
- Family: Cyperaceae
- Genus: Cyperus
- Species: C. distans

Binomial name
- Cyperus distans L.f.

= Cyperus distans =

Slender cyperus

Species of plant

Cyperus distans, also known as slender cyperus, is a species of sedge native to tropical and subtropical wetlands in sub-Saharan Africa, Asia (India, Indochina, China, Indonesia, Philippines, etc.), Madagascar, New Guinea, Australia, Latin America (from Mexico to Argentina), the West Indies, the southeastern United States (Florida, Georgia, North Carolina) and various oceanic islands.
