= Ficus vogeliana =

Conservation status
- Least Concern (IUCN 3.1)

Scientific classification
- Kingdom: Plantae
- Clade: Tracheophytes
- Clade: Angiosperms
- Clade: Eudicots
- Clade: Rosids
- Order: Rosales
- Family: Moraceae
- Genus: Ficus
- Species: F. vogeliana

Binomial name
- Ficus vogeliana (Miq.) Miq.

Synonyms
- Ficus fleuryi A.Chev.; Ficus seretii Lebrun & Boutique; Ficus stellulata Warb.; Sycomorus vogeliana Miq.

Species of plant

Ficus vogeliana is a fig species within the family Moraceae. It is a tree native to western and central tropical Africa. It is a tree which bears flagelliform infructescences (also called stolon-panicles), found at or just beneath the surface of the soil. When the figs (syconia) are subsurface it is unclear how pollination is accomplished. Its outer bark tends to be greyish, while the slash (cut bark) is reddish.

== Description ==
Ficus vogeliana is a medium to large sized tree that reaches 20 m in height with buttressed roots. The leaves arranged in spirals, with persistent stipules that can reach up to 2 cm long, petioles present and can be up to 5 cm long and 3 mm in thickness; the upper surface of the leaves is scabrous. The leaf blade tends to be elliptical to oblong, up to 22 cm long and 11 cm wide with an acuminate apex and a cordate base. Figs usually borne on branches at the base of the trunk.

== Distribution and habitat ==
It ranges from Guinea in West Africa eastwards to Uganda. It is commonly found in seasonally flooded environments, swamp and evergreen forests.

== Uses ==
The trunk of the tree is used as raw materials for canoe making in Sierra Leone while its woods is useful for carpentry work.

A decoction of bark extracts is used in traditional medecine among the Fang of Gabon who drank it as an emetic, another decoction is also used in the treatment of stomach cancer, while a leaf decoction is used in Gabon to induce vomiting.
