= Cyperus margaritaceus =

Scientific classification
- Kingdom: Plantae
- Clade: Tracheophytes
- Clade: Angiosperms
- Clade: Monocots
- Clade: Commelinids
- Order: Poales
- Family: Cyperaceae
- Genus: Cyperus
- Species: C. margaritaceus

Binomial name
- Cyperus margaritaceus Vahl

Species of sedge

Cyperus margaritaceus is a species of sedge that is native to parts of Africa.

The species was first formally described by the botanist Martin Vahl in 1805.

== See also ==
- List of Cyperus species
