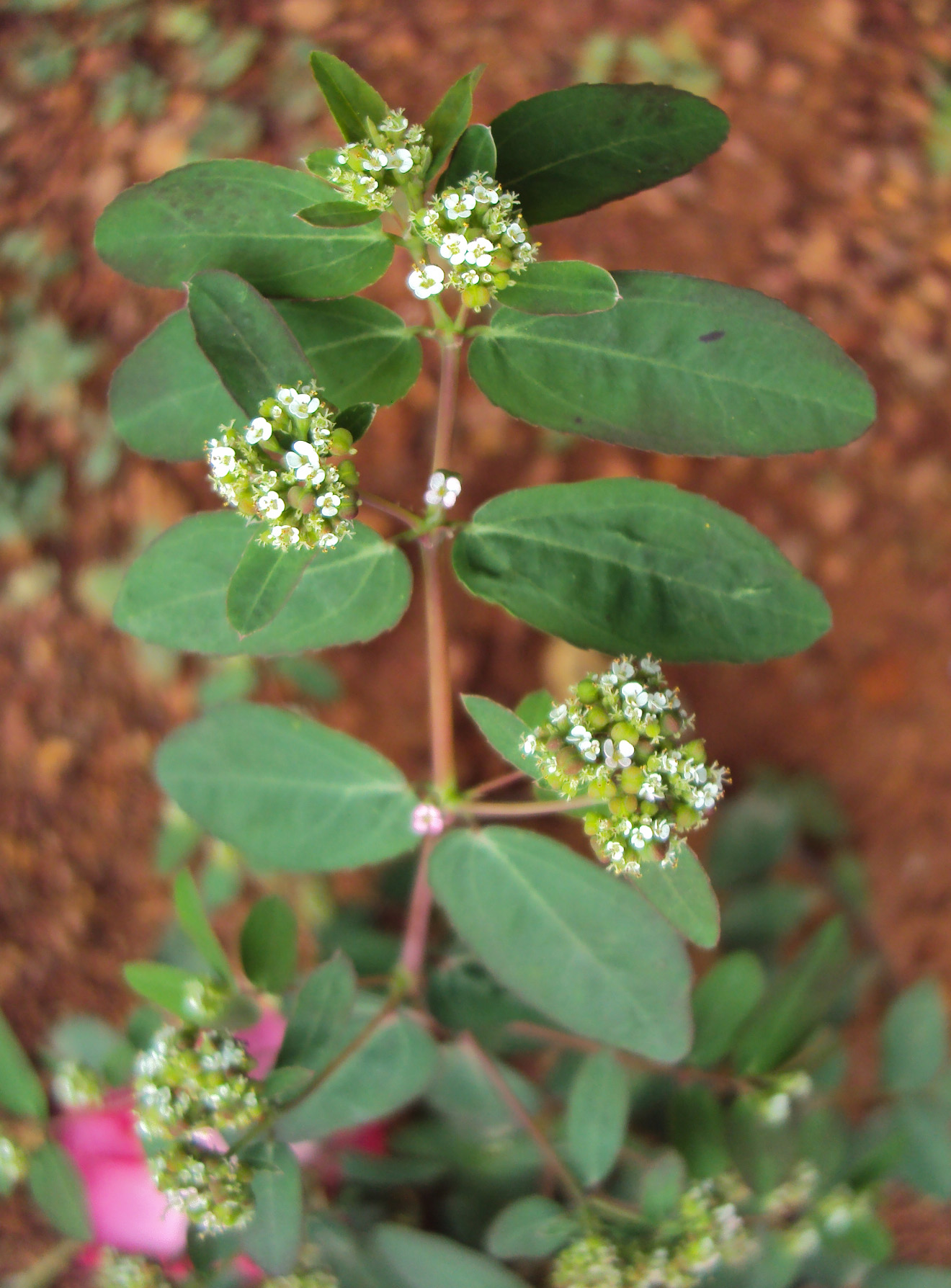

Conservation status
- Secure (NatureServe)

Scientific classification
- Kingdom: Plantae
- Clade: Tracheophytes
- Clade: Angiosperms
- Clade: Eudicots
- Clade: Rosids
- Order: Malpighiales
- Family: Euphorbiaceae
- Genus: Euphorbia
- Species: E. hypericifolia

Binomial name
- Euphorbia hypericifolia L.

Synonyms
- Anisophyllum Hypericifolium (L.); Anisophyllum indicum (Lam.) Schweinf.; Anisophyllum lasiocarpum (Klotzsch); Chamaesyce Hypericifolia (L.) Millsp.; Anisophyllunm lasiocarpum (Klotzsch) Klotzsch & Garcke; Anisophyllum lasiocarpum Klotzsch & Garcke; Chamaesyce boliviana (Rusby) Croizat; Chamaesyce glomerifera Millsp.; Chamaesyce hypericifolia (L.) Millsp.; Chamaesyce indica (Lam.) Croizat; Chamaesyce lasiocarpa (Klotzsch) Arthur; Ditritea obliqua (Raf.); Euphorbia boliviana Rusby; Euphorbia cuspidata Bertol., nom. illeg.; Euphorbia glomerifera (Millsp) LC. Wheeler; Euphorbia hypericifolia Auct. Plur. ex Boiss.; Euphorbia hypericifolia Hochst. ex Boiss.; Euphorbia hypericifolia Phil. ex Klotzsch & Garcke; Euphorbia hypericifolia var. maculata Klotzsch; Euphorbia indica Lam.; Euphorbia lasiocarpa Klotzsch; Euphorbia papilligera Boiss.

= Euphorbia hypericifolia =

Species of spurge

Euphorbia hypericifolia (commonly known as graceful spurge, golden spurge, and chickenweed) is a species of perennial herb in the genus Euphorbia native to tropical Americas. It normally grows up to 2 feet (0.6 m) in height, and contains milky sap which can cause skin and eye irritation.

== Description ==
Plant hairless on all parts, stems generally about 50 cm (rare outliers to 170 cm), obviously arching, few to many, with flowers and fruit capsules as conspicuous dense balls held a distance from the stem (FNA). Confusion with other species such as E. hyssopifolia or E. nutans may occur where the balls have few flowers in which case they will lack interspersed leaves.

== Distribution ==
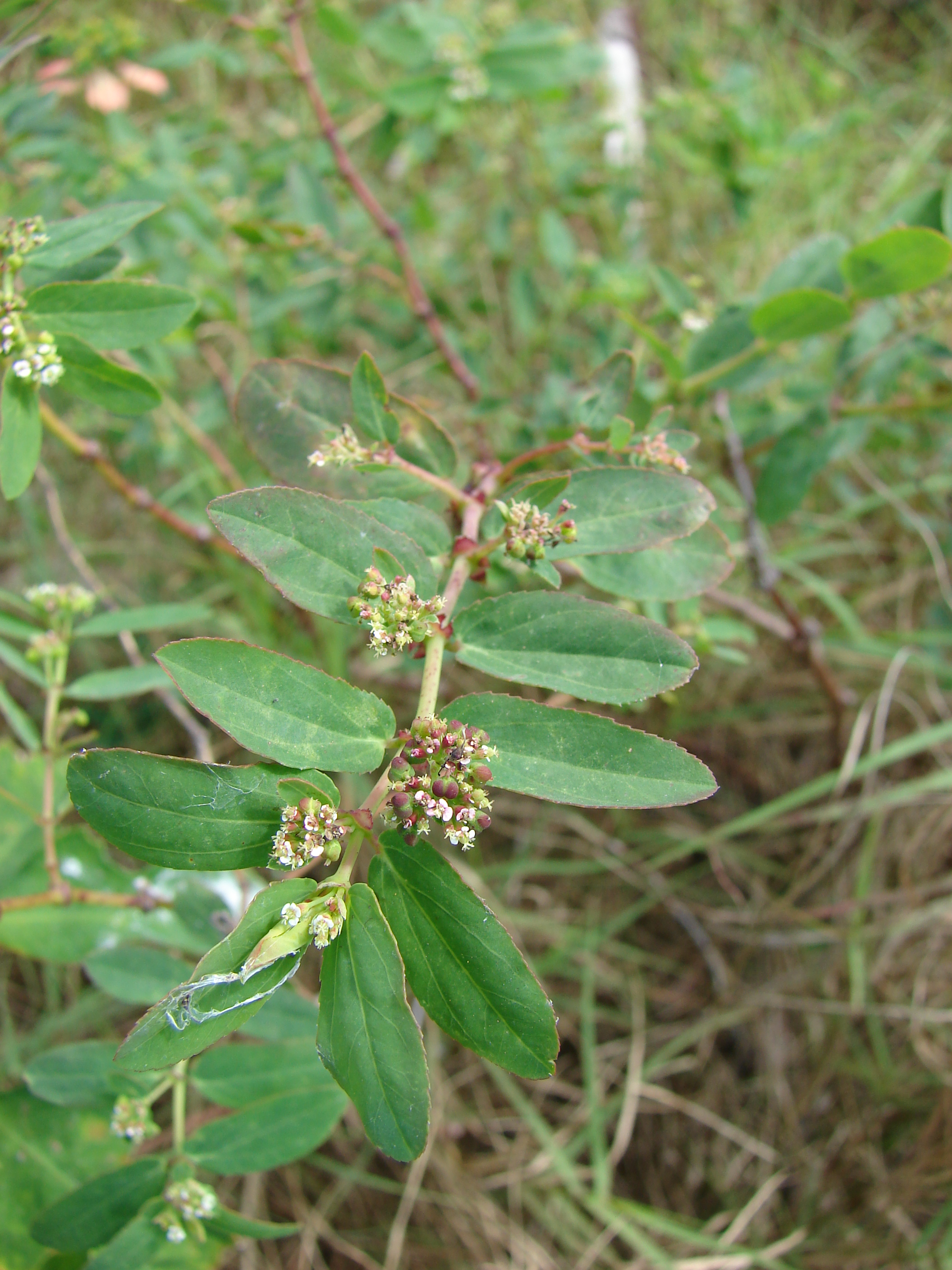
Chamaesyce Hypericifolia

The plant is native to Tropical Americas like most Euphorbias. Places where it is native include southernmost parts of U.S., Mexico, West Indies, Central and South America.

The places where this plant is an introduced species includes Spain, Italy, Greece, Indian subcontinent, China, South Korea, Myanmar, and parts of Indonesia as well as Subsaharan Africa.

== Historical uses ==
According to James Mooney, the Cherokee Indians made use of the juice from this plant to cure skin eruptions.
