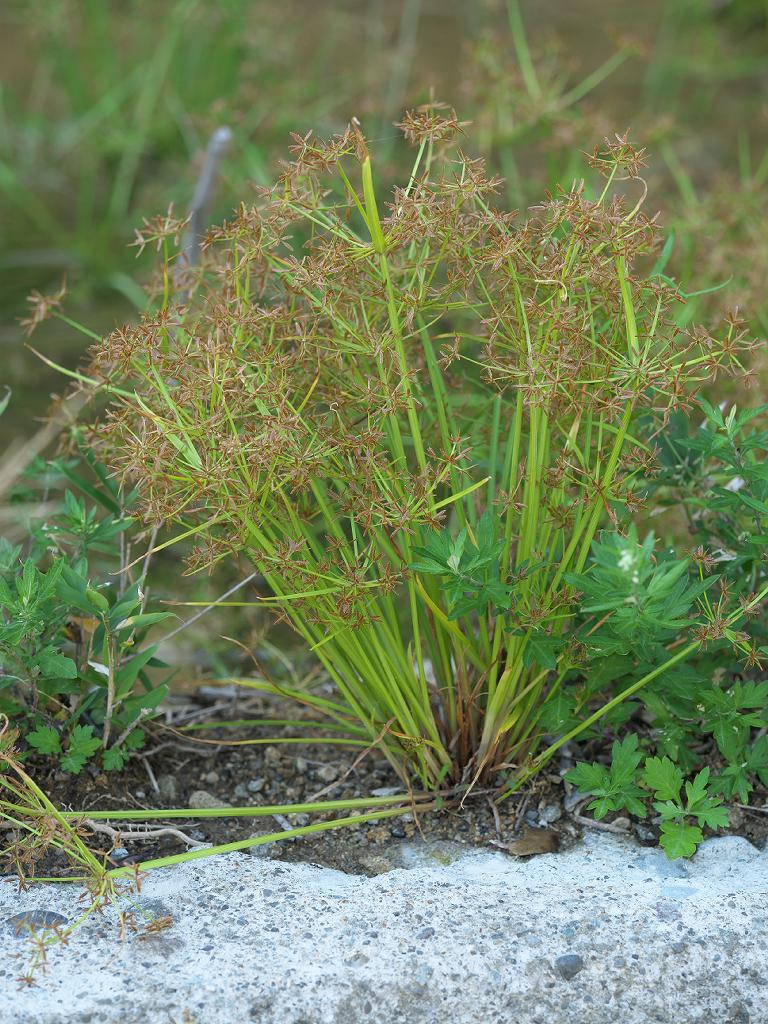

Conservation status
- Least Concern (IUCN 3.1)

Scientific classification
- Kingdom: Plantae
- Clade: Tracheophytes
- Clade: Angiosperms
- Clade: Monocots
- Clade: Commelinids
- Order: Poales
- Family: Cyperaceae
- Genus: Cyperus
- Species: C. tenuispica

Binomial name
- Cyperus tenuispica Steud.

= Cyperus tenuispica =

Species of plant

Cyperus tenuispica is a sedge of the family Cyperaceae that is native to seasonally dry tropical areas of Africa, Asia and Australia.

The annual herb to grass-like sedge typically grows to a height of 0.05 to 0.4 metres (0.2 to 1.3 ft). It blooms between February and August producing red-brown flowers.

In Africa it is found from Mauritania in the north west to sudan in the north east down to Namibia and the Northern Provinces of South Africa in the south. In Asia the range of the plant extends from Tajikistan in Central Asia through the Himalayas and into eastern parts of Asia as far as Japan. It is found across northern Australia in Western Australia, Queensland and the Northern Territory in seasonally dry tropical areas. In Western Australia it is found along streams and creeks in the Kimberley region where it grows in sandy-clay soils.

== See also ==
- List of Cyperus species
