= Cyperus pulchellus =

Scientific classification
- Kingdom: Plantae
- Clade: Tracheophytes
- Clade: Angiosperms
- Clade: Monocots
- Clade: Commelinids
- Order: Poales
- Family: Cyperaceae
- Genus: Cyperus
- Species: C. pulchellus

Binomial name
- Cyperus pulchellus R.Br.

Species of plant

Cyperus pulchellus is a sedge of the family Cyperaceae that is native to northern Australia, tropical Africa, northwest Madagascar and Southeast Asia.

The rhizomatous perennial sedge typically grows to a height of 8 to 30 cm (3 to 12 in). It blooms between January and July in Western Australia, producing white-brown flowers.

The species was first formally described by the botanist Robert Brown in 1810 as part of the work Prodromus florae Novae Hollandiae et insulae Van-Diemen, exhibens characteres plantarum quas annis 1802-1805. For centuries it was believed to be an Australian endemic, of which the only known synonyms were Cyperus sorostachys (syn. Sorostachys kyllingioides), from the oddly disjunct Philippines and Senegal.

In 1990 the botanist D. A. Simpson noted that it was the same plant as the one called Cyperus zanzibarensis in the rest of the world outside of Australia. As the name C. pulchellus is older, it has priority, and the name of the plants in the rest of the world should be changed. A 2011 taxonomic review of the genus upheld this synonymy. Other authorities do not follow Simpson.

In Australia it is found in the north; Queensland, the Northern Territory and Western Australia. In Western Australia it is found around swamps in the Kimberley region where it grows in sandy or clay soils.

== See also ==
- List of Cyperus species
