= Xyris straminea =

Scientific classification
- Kingdom: Plantae
- Clade: Tracheophytes
- Clade: Angiosperms
- Clade: Monocots
- Clade: Commelinids
- Order: Poales
- Family: Xyridaceae
- Genus: Xyris
- Species: X. straminea

Binomial name
- Xyris straminea L.A. Nilsson

Synonyms
- Xyris multicaulis N.E.Br

Species of plant

Xyris straminea is a small annual tufted species of plant in the Xyridaceae family. It can be found in seasonally wet soils and inselbergs in Tropical Africa.

== Description ==
Linear leaves, sometimes rugulose at the base and weakly curved towards the apex. Inflorescence, mostly ovoid or ellipsoid spikes distinguished by the presence of ovate pale brown bracts, between 4.5 - 6.5 mm.

== Distribution ==
Widespread in Tropical West Africa where it often grows on wet rocky slopes, rock pools and a few other seasonally wet habitats.
