= Cyperus cuspidatus =

Conservation status
- Apparently Secure (NatureServe)

Scientific classification
- Kingdom: Plantae
- Clade: Tracheophytes
- Clade: Angiosperms
- Clade: Monocots
- Clade: Commelinids
- Order: Poales
- Family: Cyperaceae
- Genus: Cyperus
- Species: C. cuspidatus

Binomial name
- Cyperus cuspidatus Kunth

Species of plant

Cyperus cuspidatus, commonly known as the coastal plain flatsedge, is a sedge of the family Cyperaceae that is native to seasonally dry tropical areas of Africa, Asia, the Americas and Australia.

== Description ==
The annual sedge typically grows to a height of 2.5 to 15 centimetres (0.98 to 5.91 in) and has a tufted habit. In Australia it blooms between February and August producing green-yellow-brown flowers. The plant has a slender root system. The glabrous culms are tufted and have a triangular cross-section with length of 1 to 17 cm (0.39 to 6.69 in) and a width of 0.2 to 0.5 mm (0.0079 to 0.0197 in). It has linear shaped leaf blades that can be flat or rolled that taper to a pointed end. The leaves are 1 to 13.5 cm (0.39 to 5.31 in) in length and have a width of 0.2 to 1.1 cm (0.079 to 0.433 in). the leaves are accompanied by red-brown to purple coloured sheaths of a similar length and width.

== Taxonomy ==
The species was described by the botanist Carl Sigismund Kunth in 1816 as a part of the work Nova genera et species plantarum authored by Kunth, Aimé Bonpland and Alexander von Humboldt. It has a total of 18 synonyms including; Cyperus angustifolius, Cyperus gratus, Cyperus recurvus, Cyperus waterlotii and Dichostylis cuspidata. The type specimen was collected by von Humboldt and Bonpland in Venezuela in 1800.

== Distribution ==
In Australia it is found in Queensland, the Northern Territory and it is found along creeks, streams and rivers in the Kimberley region of Western Australia where it grows in stony red sand-loam soils over sandstone. In Asia it is found from Pakistan in the west to China in the east and extends down into Malesia. It is found in southern parts of North America extending through Central America and in northern parts of South America.

== See also ==
- List of Cyperus species
