= Cyperus tenuiculmis =

Scientific classification
- Kingdom: Plantae
- Clade: Tracheophytes
- Clade: Angiosperms
- Clade: Monocots
- Clade: Commelinids
- Order: Poales
- Family: Cyperaceae
- Genus: Cyperus
- Species: C. tenuiculmis

Binomial name
- Cyperus tenuiculmis Boeckeler

Species of sedge

Cyperus tenuiculmis is a species of sedge that is endemic to tropical parts of central Africa, north eastern Australia and south east Asia.

The species was first formally described by the botanist Johann Otto Boeckeler in 1870.

== See also ==
- List of Cyperus species
