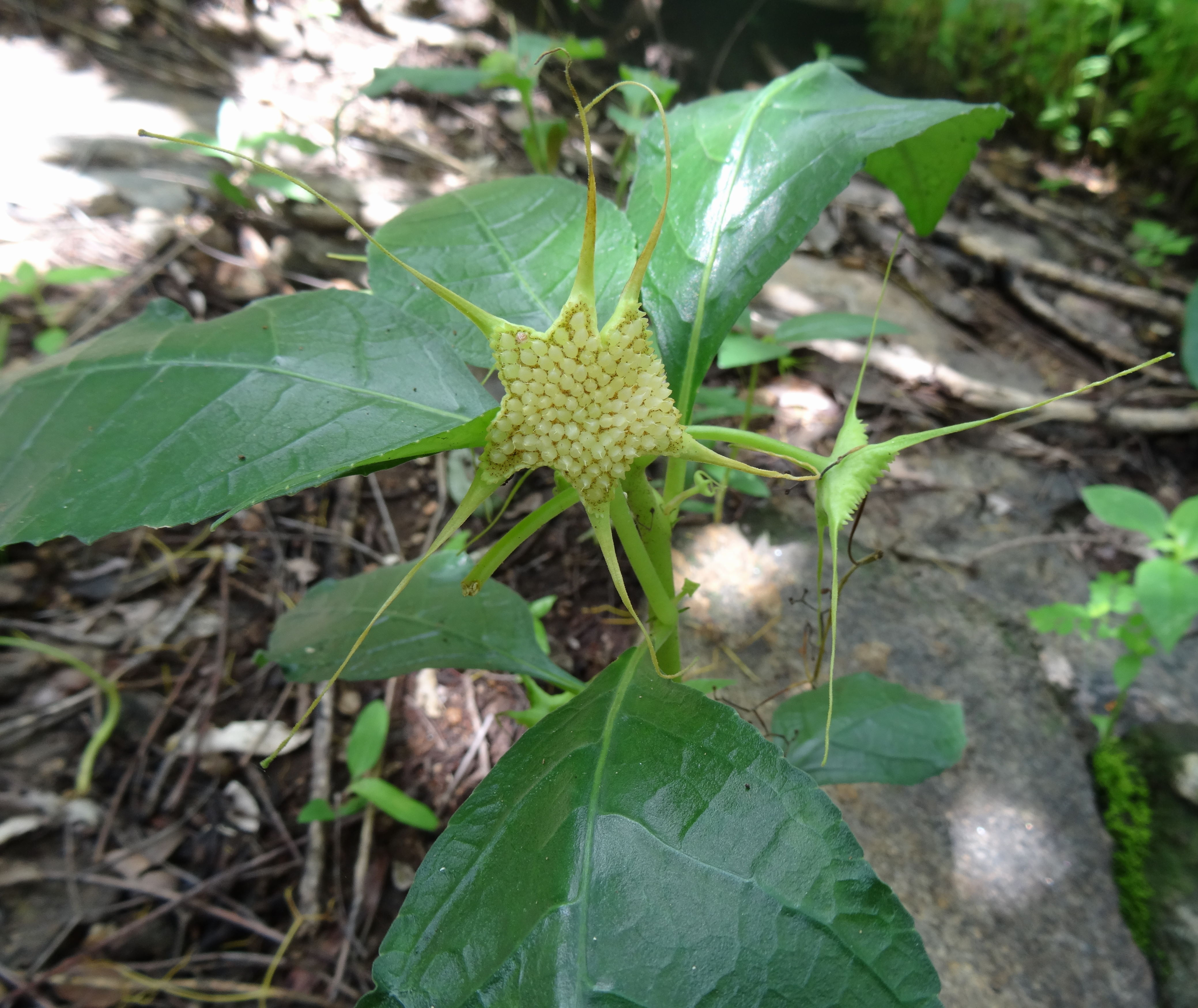

Scientific classification
- Kingdom: Plantae
- Clade: Tracheophytes
- Clade: Angiosperms
- Clade: Eudicots
- Clade: Rosids
- Order: Rosales
- Family: Moraceae
- Genus: Dorstenia
- Species: D. cuspidata

Binomial name
- Dorstenia cuspidata C.F.F. Hochstetter
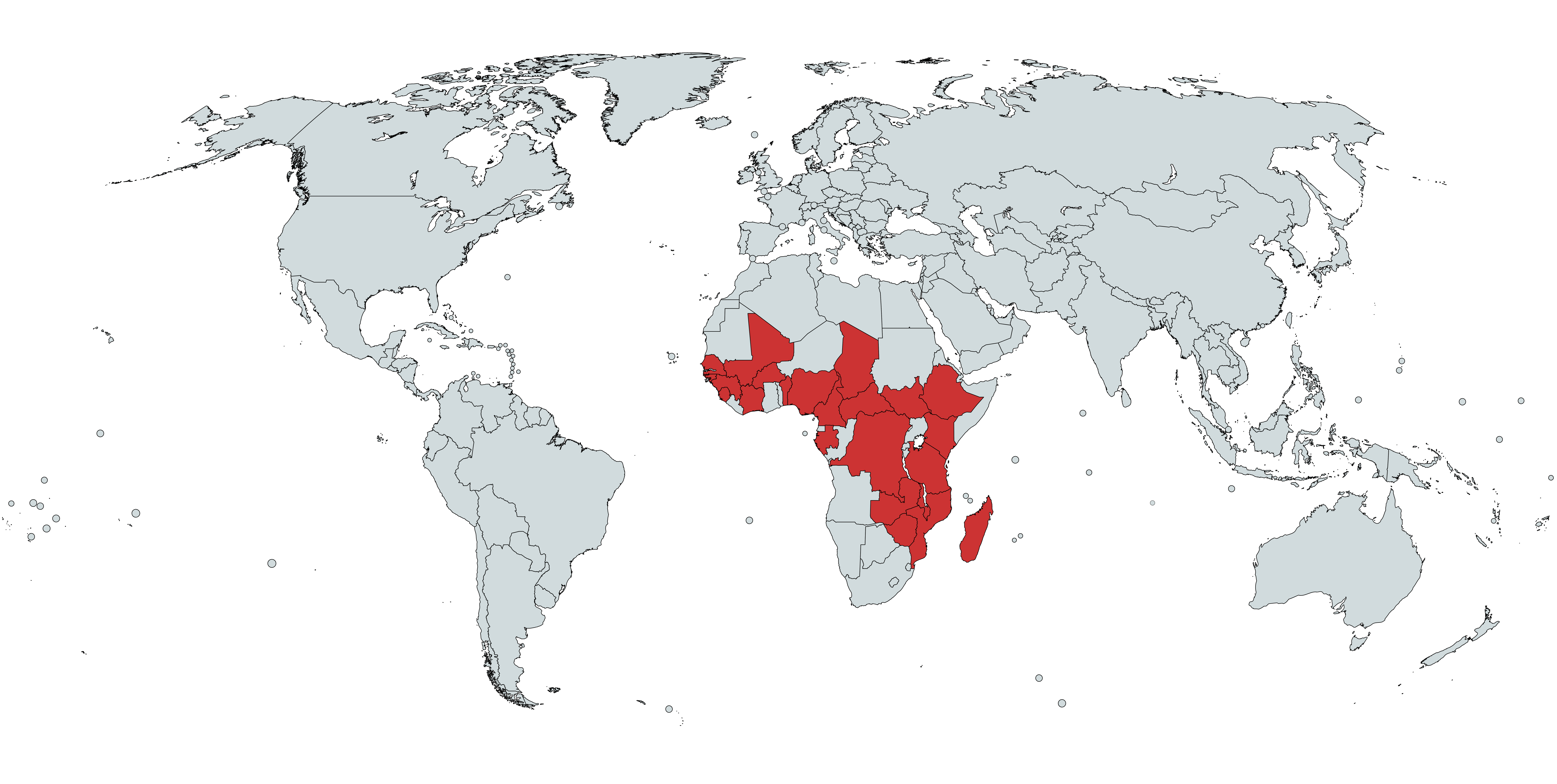
- Approximate range of Dorstenia cuspidata

= Dorstenia cuspidata =

Species of plant

Dorstenia cuspidata is a plant species in the Moraceae family. It has several varieties, including var. brinkmaniana, var. cuspidata, var. humblotiana, and var. preussii. It was described by Christian Ferdinand Friedrich Hochstetter.

== Description ==
Dorstenia cuspidata is a herbaceous plant native to tropical regions of Africa. It typically grows to a height of 5 cm (2.0 in) to 50 cm (20 in), with annual, erect stems that are usually unbranched. These stems arise from a tuberous root system, which can be discoid, subglobose, or irregular in shape, measuring approximately 1 cm (0.39 in) to 7 cm (2.8 in) in width and about 4 cm (1.6 in) centimeters in height. The leaves are spirally arranged along the stem, with petioles ranging from 2 cm (0.79 in) to 25 cm (9.8 in) in length. The leaf blades are typically elliptic to oblong, lanceolate, or linear in shape. The plant produces a receptacle that is triangular with three appendages or, in some cases, variously shaped with 4 to 14 appendages.

== Taxonomy ==
Dorstenia cuspidata was described by Christian Ferdinand Friedrich Hochstetter and published in Tentamen Florae Abyssinicae (English: Essay on the Abyssinian Flora).

== Ecology ==
Dorstenia cuspidata is a plant native to tropical Africa, commonly found in habitats such as miombo woodlands, thickets, and coastal shrublands. It thrives in shaded environments, often growing among rocks or along riverbanks. This species is typically found at elevations ranging from 600 m (2,000 ft) to 1,300 m (4,300 ft). It is a tuberous geophyte, characterized by a tuberous root system that enables it to survive in seasonally dry conditions.

== Distribution ==
Dorstenia cuspidata is native to tropical Africa, with a regional distribution that spans Western Africa, including Benin, Burkina Faso, Cameroon, Gabon, Guinea, Guinea-Bissau, Ivory Coast, Nigeria, Senegal, and Sierra Leone; Central Africa, including the Central African Republic, Chad, the Democratic Republic of the Congo, Malawi, Mali, Zambia, and Zimbabwe; Eastern Africa, including Ethiopia, Kenya, Mozambique, South Sudan, and Tanzania; and the Western Indian Ocean, including Madagascar.
