= Akeassia =

Scientific classification
- Kingdom: Plantae
- Clade: Tracheophytes
- Clade: Angiosperms
- Clade: Eudicots
- Clade: Asterids
- Order: Asterales
- Family: Asteraceae
- Subfamily: Asteroideae
- Tribe: Astereae
- Subtribe: Grangeinae
- Genus: Akeassia; J.-P.Lebrun & Stork
- Species: A. grangeoides

Binomial name
- Akeassia grangeoides J.-P.Lebrun & Stork

Genus of flowering plants

Akeassia is a genus of flowering plants belonging to the family Asteraceae. It contains a single species, Akeassia grangeoides.

Its native range is Western Tropical Africa to South Sudan.
