= Cyperus amabilis =

Conservation status
- Least Concern (IUCN 3.1)

Scientific classification
- Kingdom: Plantae
- Clade: Tracheophytes
- Clade: Angiosperms
- Clade: Monocots
- Clade: Commelinids
- Order: Poales
- Family: Cyperaceae
- Genus: Cyperus
- Species: C. amabilis

Binomial name
- Cyperus amabilis Vahl

Species of sedge

Cyperus amabilis, commonly known as the foothill flatsedge, is a species of sedge that is native to tropical and sub-tropical areas in the Americas, Africa and Asia.

The species was first formally described by the botanist Martin Vahl in 1805.

== See also ==
- List of Cyperus species
