= Sheila Spenser Hooper =

British botanist (1925–2022)

Sheila Spenser Hooper (1925 – 3 May 2022) was a British botanist and plant collector noted for traveling to gather plants from around the world, including India, Tanzania, and Kenya. She was a specialist on Cyperaceae and a curator at Kew Gardens. She described over fifty species. The standard author abbreviation S. S. Hooper is used to indicate this person as the author when citing a botanical name. She often published with Kew Bulletin. One of these publications was an illustrated description and discussion of spikelets in Cyperaceae. She collected plant specimens on expeditions with Kanchi Gandhi, Leonard B Mwasumbi, and Clifford Charles Townsend.

Hooper later lived in Surbiton. She died on 3 May 2022.
