= Hirschmanniella oryzae =

Scientific classification
- Kingdom: Animalia
- Phylum: Nematoda
- Class: Chromadorea
- Order: Rhabditida
- Family: Pratylenchidae
- Genus: Hirschmanniella
- Species: H. oryzae

Binomial name
- Hirschmanniella oryzae (van Breda de Haan, 1902)

Species of roundworm

Hirschmanniella oryzae, the rice root nematode (RRN), is among the major pests of rice and is the most common plant-parasitic nematode found on irrigated rice. Recent modifications in cultivation practices have led to a substantial increase in rice production, which has been accompanied by heightened levels of RRN. The proportional increases in RRN with rice production can be explained by the nematode's impeccable adaptation towards constantly flooded conditions in which irrigated rice is often being grown.

The genus Hirschmanniella is found within the family Pratylenchidae and contains around 35 species, the majority of which are migratory endoparasitic nematodes of plant roots.

== Distribution ==
RRN can be found throughout rice- and non-rice-growing regions of the world, including the United States, but is most commonly found in tropical and subtropical regions of Asia. RRN has been identified in all of the following Asian countries: Myanmar, India, Pakistan, Bangladesh, Sri Lanka, Nepal, Thailand, Vietnam, Indonesia, the Philippines, China, Korea, and Japan.

== Morphology ==
The type species of the genus Hirschmanniella, H. spinicaudata, has been used for detailed morphological studies. As adults, these nematodes range from 0.9 to 4.2 millimetres (5/128 to 21/128 in) in length. The cephalic framework is well developed internally and flattened anteriorly to hemispherical. The stylet, i.e. mouthspear, is relatively short with only three to five times the length of the body diameter at the basal plate. There is ventral overlap of the esophagus with the intestine. The lateral field has four incisures. Females are didelphic; they contain paired ovaries. The phasmids are located in the posterior third of the tail, which are three to five times as long as the body width at the anus, tapering, and usually terminating in a point or mucron. In males, no caudal alae can be found enveloping the tail. There is no sexual dimorphism in the anterior part of the body.

== Life cycle and reproduction ==
RRN is sexually dimorphic, i.e. sexes are separate, and reproduction is amphimictic or bisexual; both sexes are required. Following fertilization, adult females lay oval-shaped eggs, mostly within the cortex, measuring 66–72 μm in length by 26–40 μm in width that hatch after 4 to 5 days while inside the root. There are 4 molts that occur throughout the RRN life cycle, the first of which occurs in the egg. The hatched stage 2 juvenile, while migrating through and feeding on cells in the cortex, then completes 3 successive molts, and after the final molt, immature adult females and males emerge with gonads not yet fully developed. The complete life cycle takes one month from the egg to develop into an adult.

RRN can survive at temperatures ranging from 8–45 °C (46–113 °F); however, 21–28 °C (70–82 °F) is the optimal range for RRN multiplication.

== Host parasite relationship ==
Although rice is the principal host, around 30 other plants have been reported to be parasitized by RRN including cotton, maize, sugarcane, finger millet, pearl millet, okra, and tomato. Weeds including Chenopodium album, Echinochloa colona, E. glabrescens, Cyperus difformis, Rumex dentatus, Juncus spp., Reeds, common cattail (Typha latifolia), Bolboschoenus maritimus/Scirpus maritimus, umbrella sedge, and rusty sedge have also been reported as excellent hosts.

On rice, disease symptoms of RRN infection are not easily identified in above ground tissues and an infested field may show no symptoms other than reduced grain yields. However, the events during an RRN infection on rice have been well studied. It has been found that RRN can penetrate anywhere along the roots of rice except at the tips or the thin lateral roots. The penetrated nematodes can either enter the root completely or simply embed their heads into the cortex. While migrating through the cortex, RRN can be found feeding from cortical cells or vascular bundles anywhere inside the root. However, there is bias towards cellular feeding at the base of root hairs resulting in root hair destruction.

RRN-infected roots may first show a yellowish to brown color that eventually darkens, and heavily infected roots may decay after turning brown or black. These below ground symptoms begin by the formation of small brown lesions at points where nematodes have ruptured the surface and entered. Following these early symptoms, damaged epidermal cells may become necrotic and cavities may form inside the roots as a result of damaged cortical cells.

In situ hybridization has shown the activity of esophageal glands in the production of cell wall degrading enzymes such as xylanase and β-mannanase possibly involved in hemicellulose degradation; thaumatin-like protein (TLP) probably involved in protection against bacterial pathogens; late embryogenesis abundant (LEA) proteins possibly involved in the process of anhydrobiosis during survival in dry conditions; and two putative effector proteins that may alter the host defense mechanism: chorismate mutase (CM) and isochorismatase (ICM), thought to be interfering on the salicylic acid pathway and thereby altering the defense mechanisms of the host. For example, a CM might be reducing host phenylpropanoid concentrations, and another CM makes Oryza sativa more susceptible through an unknown mechanism. The ICM is called HoICM, and HoICM seems to have the same phenylpropanoid pathway effect on O. sativa. Although no ICM is confirmed to be produced by any nematode, it is assumed to be secreted by nematodes.

== Management ==
There are two major issues for the management of RRN in regards to the nematode's biology. The first is the migratory nature of the nematode. Upon root necrosis, these nematodes can leave and reenter the soil to infect neighboring plants, continuing their destructive migratory force. The second is the survival of RRN. Both eggs and juveniles can overwinter in dead roots. In response to rice paddy desiccation, these nematodes can survive by entering an anhydrobiotic state until the rains begin, which allows the nematode populations to remain dormant.

As a consequence to the nematode's behavior and survival, control measures have proven with little success. Also, certain control measures such as the use of nematicides are not economically feasible since rice does not have a high enough cash value in developing countries, where rice production is most prevalent. More cost effective, organic control measures such as dry fallow and rotation have proven effective, but farmers cannot afford taking the land out of production for the necessary length of time to abate the destructive levels of RRN. Weed control and natural resistances of rice are possible control measures that may prove more effective in the future, but the lack of extensive research efforts for varietal resistance renders the latter unsuccessful. Fortunately, nutritional experiments indicate that when plants are given the proper cultural care, they can produce a satisfactory crop though heavily infected, which allows for a level of tolerance of rice to RRN.

Nitrogen amendments are often used as a means to offset the damage caused to rice by plant-parasitic nematodes, specifically offsetting yield losses associated with the disease. Poussin, Neuts, & Mateille (2005) found that nitrogen amendments applied at a rate of 80 kilograms per hectare (71 lb/acre) increased the weight of each rice grain thereby offsetting the damage caused by RRN. However, nitrogen amendments at this rate also increased H. oryzae populations, which could lead to increasing problems in future rice cropping cycles down the line, ultimately rendering it an unsustainable solution.
