= Fimbristylis laxiglumis =

Conservation status
- Priority Two — Poorly Known Taxa (DEC)

Scientific classification
- Kingdom: Plantae
- Clade: Tracheophytes
- Clade: Angiosperms
- Clade: Monocots
- Clade: Commelinids
- Order: Poales
- Family: Cyperaceae
- Genus: Fimbristylis
- Species: F. laxiglumis

Binomial name
- Fimbristylis laxiglumis Latz

Species of grass-like plant

Fimbristylis laxiglumis is a sedge of the family Cyperaceae that is native to Australia.

The annual grass-like or herb sedge typically grows to a height of 0.6 metres (1.97 ft) and has a tufted habit. It blooms between March and April and produces brown flowers.

In Western Australia it is found in the Kimberley region where it grows in black clay soils.
