= Fimbristylis blepharolepis =

Scientific classification
- Kingdom: Plantae
- Clade: Tracheophytes
- Clade: Angiosperms
- Clade: Monocots
- Clade: Commelinids
- Order: Poales
- Family: Cyperaceae
- Genus: Fimbristylis
- Species: F. blepharolepis

Binomial name
- Fimbristylis blepharolepis J.Kern

Species of grass-like plant

Fimbristylis blepharolepis is a sedge of the family Cyperaceae that is native to Australia.

The annual grass-like or herb sedge typically grows to a height of 0.5 to 1.3 metres (1.6 to 4.3 ft). It blooms between May and June and produces brown flowers.

In Western Australia it is found in and around swamps in the Kimberley region.
