= Fimbristylis blakei =

Scientific classification
- Kingdom: Plantae
- Clade: Tracheophytes
- Clade: Angiosperms
- Clade: Monocots
- Clade: Commelinids
- Order: Poales
- Family: Cyperaceae
- Genus: Fimbristylis
- Species: F. blakei

Binomial name
- Fimbristylis blakei Latz

Species of grass-like plant

Fimbristylis blakei is a sedge of the family Cyperaceae that is native to Australia.

The rhizomatous perennial grass-like or herb sedge typically grows to a height of 0.08 to 0.6 metres (0.26 to 1.97 ft) and has a tufted habit. It blooms between September and October and produces brown flowers.

In Western Australia it is found on sandstone and quartzite hills in the Kimberley region.
