= Rusty sedge =

Rusty sedge is a common name for several plants and may refer to:

- Carex subfusca
- Fimbristylis ferruginea, plant native to parts of Africa, southern Asia, and South America, and Australia
- Fimbristylis polytrichoides, plant native to east Africa, Madagascar, China, Southeast Asia, New Guinea and Australia
