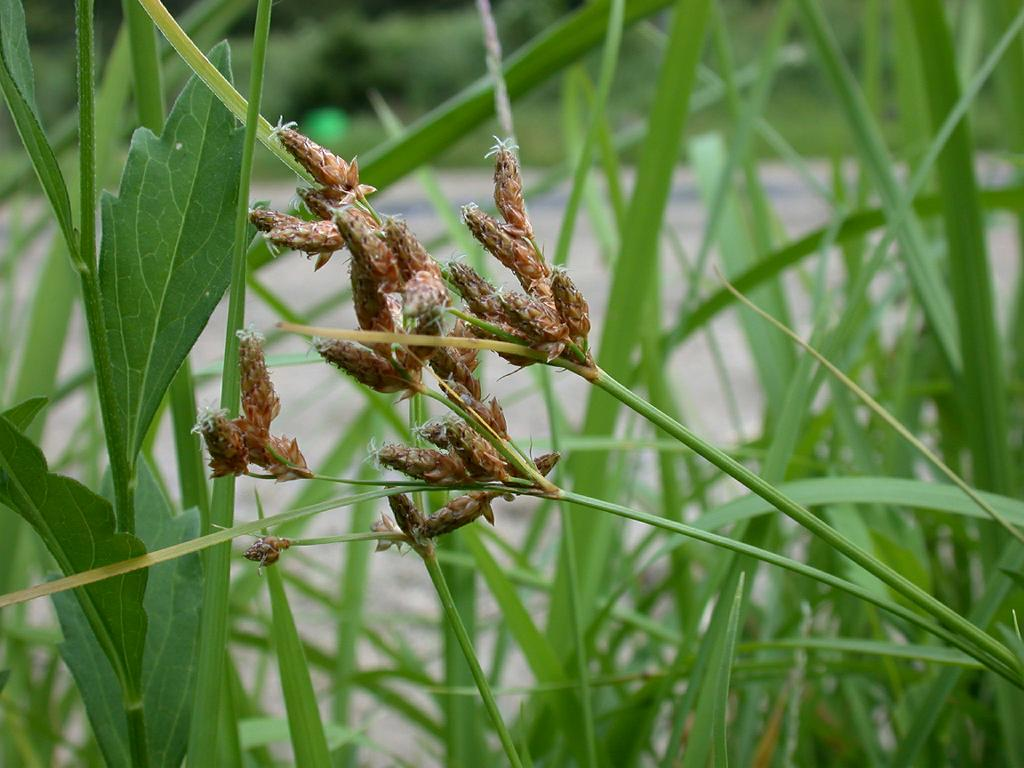
- Fimbristylis dichotoma

Scientific classification
- Kingdom: Plantae
- Clade: Tracheophytes
- Clade: Angiosperms
- Clade: Monocots
- Clade: Commelinids
- Order: Poales
- Family: Cyperaceae
- Tribe: Abildgaardieae
- Genus: Fimbristylis; Vahl

Synonyms
- Abildgardia Rchb., orth. var.; Aplostemon Raf.; Campylostachys E.Mey., illegitimate homonym, not Campylostachys Kunth (Stilbaceae); Crosslandia W.Fitzg.; Dichostylis P.Beauv. in T.G.Lestiboudois; Echinolytrum Desv.; Gussonea J.Presl & C.Presl; Iria (Pers.) R.Hedw.; Iriha Kuntze; Mischospora Boeckeler; Pogonostylis Bertol.; Pseudocyperus Steud.; Trichelostylis T.Lestib.; Tylocarya Nelmes

= Fimbristylis =

Fimbristyle

Genus of grass-like plants

Fimbristylis is a genus of sedges. A plant in this genus may be known commonly as a fimbry or fimbristyle. There are over 300 species distributed worldwide. Several continents have native species but many species have been introduced to regions where they are not native. Some are considered weeds. These are typical sedges in appearance, with stiff, ridged stems and cone-shaped terminal panicles of spikelets. They are found in wet environments, and are most diverse in tropical and subtropical regions.

== Selected species ==
312 species are currently accepted. Selected species include:

- Fimbristylis acicularis R.Br.
- Fimbristylis acuminata Vahl – pointed fimbristylis
- Fimbristylis aestivalis (Retz.) Vahl – summer fimbry
- Fimbristylis agasthyamalaensis Viji & Preetha
- Fimbristylis ammobiaLatz
- Fimbristylis autumnalis (L.) Roem. & Schult. – slender fimbry
- Fimbristylis blakei Latz
- Fimbristylis blepharolepis J.Kern
- Fimbristylis caespitosa R.Br.
- Fimbristylis cardiocarpa F.Muell.
- Fimbristylis cephalophora F.Muell.
- Fimbristylis cinnamometorum (Vahl) Kunth
- Fimbristylis compacta Turrill
- Fimbristylis complanata (Retz.) Link – Puerto Rico fimbry
- Fimbristylis corynocarya F.Muell.
- Fimbristylis costiglumis Domin
- Fimbristylis crosslandii Roalson, R.L.Barrett & Larridon – Formerly C. setifolia
- Fimbristylis cymosa R.Br. – tropical fimbry, mauu akiaki
- Fimbristylis denudata R.Br.
- Fimbristylis dichotoma (L.) Vahl – two-leaf fimbrystylis, tall fringe-rush
  - Fimbristylis dichotoma subsp. depauperata (synonym Fimbristylis depauperata)
- Fimbristylis dictyocolea S.T.Blake
- Fimbristylis dipsacea (Rottb.) C.B.Clarke
- Fimbristylis dura (Zoll. & Moritzi) Merr.
- Fimbristylis elegans S.T.Blake
- Fimbristylis eremophila Latz
- Fimbristylis ferruginea (L.) Vahl – rusty sedge, West Indian fimbry
- Fimbristylis hawaiiensis Hillebr. – Hawaii fimbry
- Fimbristylis helicophylla Rye, R.L.Barrett & M.D.Barrett – twisted leaf fimbristylis
- Fimbristylis hirsutifolia Govind.
- Fimbristylis inaguensis Britton – Bahama fimbry
- Fimbristylis insignis Thwaites
- Fimbristylis lanceolata C.B.Clarke
- Fimbristylis laxiglumis Latz
- Fimbristylis leucocolea Benth.
- Fimbristylis littoralis Gaudich. – lesser fimbristylis
- Fimbristylis macassarensis Steud.
- Fimbristylis microcarya F.Muell.
- Fimbristylis neilsonii F.Muell.
- Fimbristylis onchnidiocarpa J.Kern
- Fimbristylis perpusilla R.M.Harper ex Small & Britton – Harper's fimbry
- Fimbristylis polytrichoides (Retz.) R.Br. – rusty sedge
- Fimbristylis puberula (Michx.) Vahl – hairy fimbry
- Fimbristylis quinquangularis (Vahl) Kunth
  - Fimbristylis quinquangularis subsp. quinquangularis (synonym Fimbristylis miliacea (L.) Vahl) – grasslike fimbry
- Fimbristylis schoenoides (Retz.) Vahl – ditch fimbry
- Fimbristylis spadicea (L.) Vahl – marsh fimbry, salt marsh fimbristylis
- Fimbristylis thermalis S.Watson – hot springs fimbry
- Fimbristylis tristachya R.Br.
- Fimbristylis umbellaris R.Br. – globular fimbrystylis
- Fimbristylis vahlii (Lam.) Link – Vahl's fimbry
- Fimbristylis velata R.Br. (now distinguished from F. squarrosa)

== Formerly placed here ==
- Abildgaardia macrantha (Boeckeler) Goetgh. (as Fimbristylis macrantha Boeckeler)
- Scleroschoenus compositus (Latz) K.L.Wilson & J.J.Bruhl (as Fimbristylis composita Latz)
