= Cyperus trialatus =

Scientific classification
- Kingdom: Plantae
- Clade: Tracheophytes
- Clade: Angiosperms
- Clade: Monocots
- Clade: Commelinids
- Order: Poales
- Family: Cyperaceae
- Genus: Cyperus
- Species: C. trialatus

Binomial name
- Cyperus trialatus (Boeckeler) J.Kern, 1954

Species of sedge

Cyperus trialatus is a species of sedge that is native to south eastern parts of Asia and south western parts of Melanesia.

== See also ==
- List of Cyperus species
