= Fimbristylis eremophila =

Scientific classification
- Kingdom: Plantae
- Clade: Tracheophytes
- Clade: Angiosperms
- Clade: Monocots
- Clade: Commelinids
- Order: Poales
- Family: Cyperaceae
- Genus: Fimbristylis
- Species: F. eremophila

Binomial name
- Fimbristylis eremophila Latz

Species of grass-like plant

Fimbristylis eremophila is a sedge of the family Cyperaceae that is native to Australia.

The perennial grass-like or herb sedge typically grows to a height of 0.1 to 0.3 metres (0.33 to 0.98 ft) and has a tufted habit. It blooms between January and April and produces red-brown flowers.

In Western Australia it is found on sandy plains and along creeks and streams in the Pilbara and Goldfields regions where it grows in red sandy soils.
