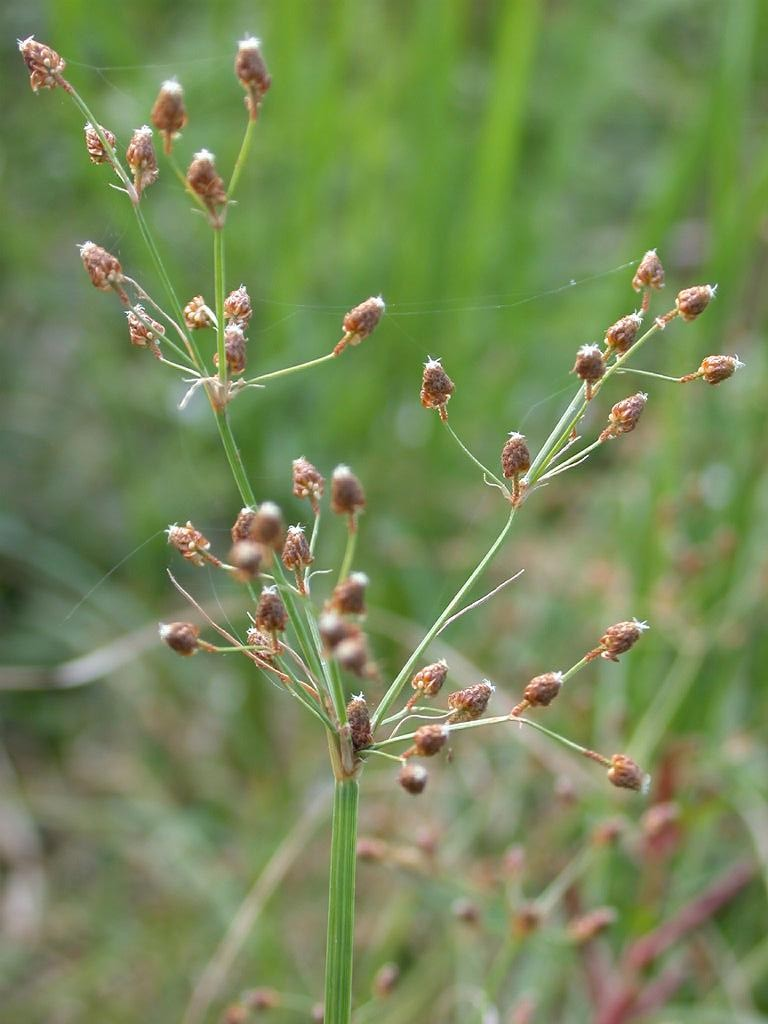

Scientific classification
- Kingdom: Plantae
- Clade: Tracheophytes
- Clade: Angiosperms
- Clade: Monocots
- Clade: Commelinids
- Order: Poales
- Family: Cyperaceae
- Genus: Fimbristylis
- Species: F. miliacea

Binomial name
- Fimbristylis miliacea (L.) Vahl

Synonyms
- Scirpus miliaceus L.

= Fimbristylis miliacea =

Grasslike fimbry

Species of grass-like plant

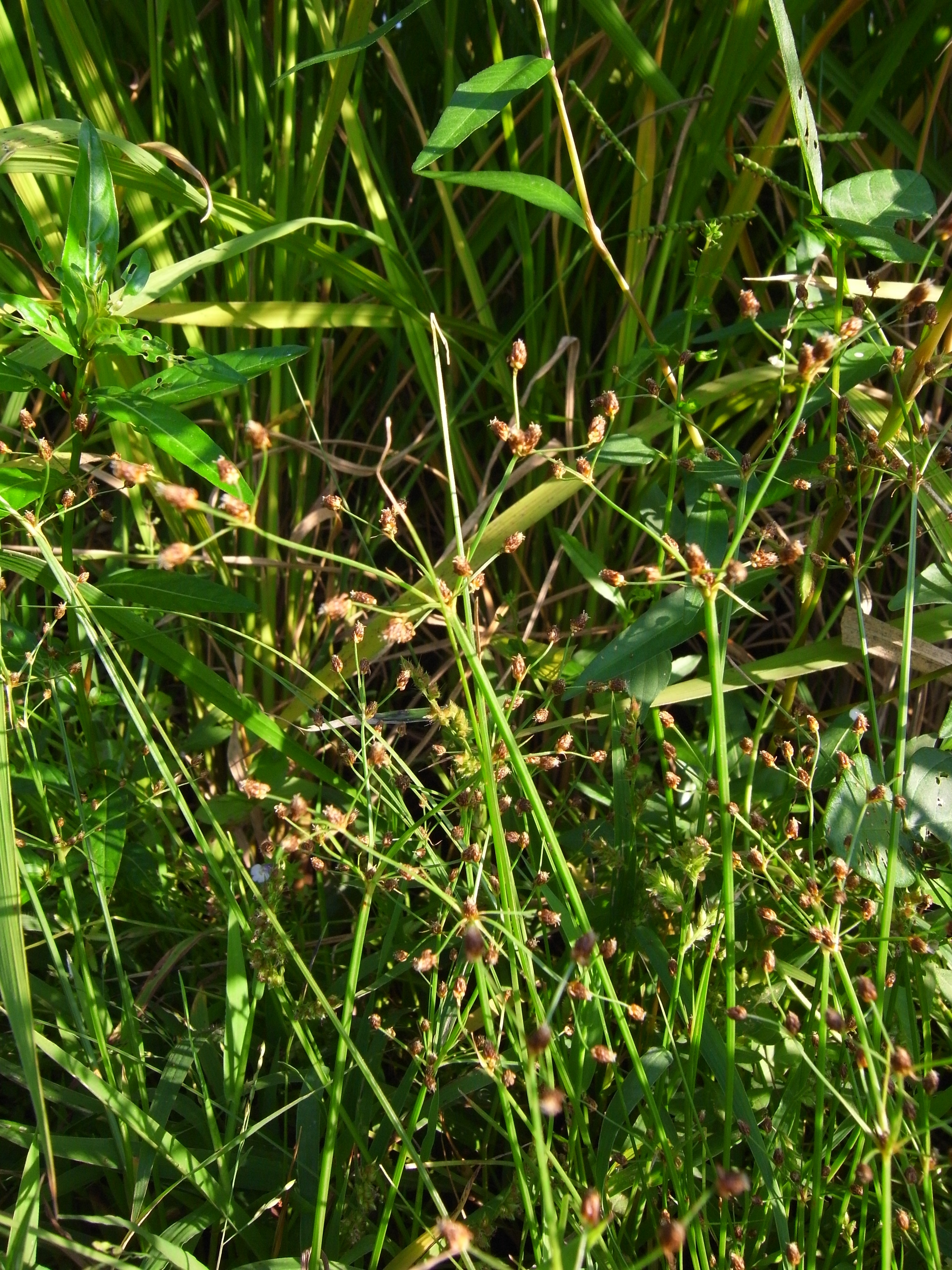
Fimbristylis miliacea habit

Fimbristylis miliacea, the grasslike fimbry or hoorahgrass, is a species of fimbry that probably originated in coastal tropical Asia but has since spread to most continents as an introduced species. It is a widespread weed in some areas and is sometimes problematic in rice paddies.

== Description ==
Fimbristylis miliacea is an annual sedge which grows in clumps of erect stems up to about half a meter in height surrounded by fans of narrow flat leaves. The top of each stem is occupied by an array of spikelets, each borne on a long peduncle. The spikelet is spherical to ovate and reddish brown in color. The spikelets flower and then develop tiny fruits, which are brown achenes about a millimeter long.

== Taxonomy ==
The name Fimbristylis miliacea is a combination made by Martin Vahl based on the name Scirpus miliaceus published by Carl Linnaeus in his 1759 10th edition of Systema Naturae. Because of confusion surrounding this name, and following a failed attempt to conserve the name with a particular sense (nomen conservandum), a successful proposal was made in 2004 to have "Scirpus miliaceus" rejected (nomen rejiciendum) under the International Code of Botanical Nomenclature. The two taxa to which the name Fimbristylis miliacea had previously been applied therefore became Fimbristylis quinquangularis and Fimbristylis littoralis.

== Distribution ==
The species is found throughout many countries with a tropical or sub-tropical climate in southern and south-east Asia including: Australia, Bangladesh, Bhutan, Cambodia, India, Indonesia, Malaysia, Myanmar, Nepal, Pakistan, Philippines, Sri Lanka, Thailand and Vietnam. It has also been introduced into Ecuador, Madagascar, Nicaragua, Peru and Suriname.
