= Fimbristylis ammobia =

Scientific classification
- Kingdom: Plantae
- Clade: Tracheophytes
- Clade: Angiosperms
- Clade: Monocots
- Clade: Commelinids
- Order: Poales
- Family: Cyperaceae
- Genus: Fimbristylis
- Species: F. ammobia

Binomial name
- Fimbristylis ammobia Latz

Species of grass-like plant

Fimbristylis ammobia is a sedge of the family Cyperaceae that is native to Australia.

The annual grass-like or herb sedge typically grows to a height of 0.1 to 0.2 metres (0.33 to 0.66 ft) and has a tufted habit. It blooms between March and July and produces brown flowers.

In Western Australia it is found in the Kimberley region where it grows in red sandy soils around sandstone.
