= Fimbristylis hirsutifolia =

Conservation status
- Critically Endangered (IUCN 3.1)

Scientific classification
- Kingdom: Plantae
- Clade: Tracheophytes
- Clade: Angiosperms
- Clade: Monocots
- Clade: Commelinids
- Order: Poales
- Family: Cyperaceae
- Genus: Fimbristylis
- Species: F. hirsutifolia

Binomial name
- Fimbristylis hirsutifolia Govind.

Species of grass-like plant

Fimbristylis hirsutifolia is a critically endangered species of fimbry found only in India. It is endemic to the Malappuram district of the state of Kerala. This species was named due to hairs (hirsute) present on the leaves of the plant.
