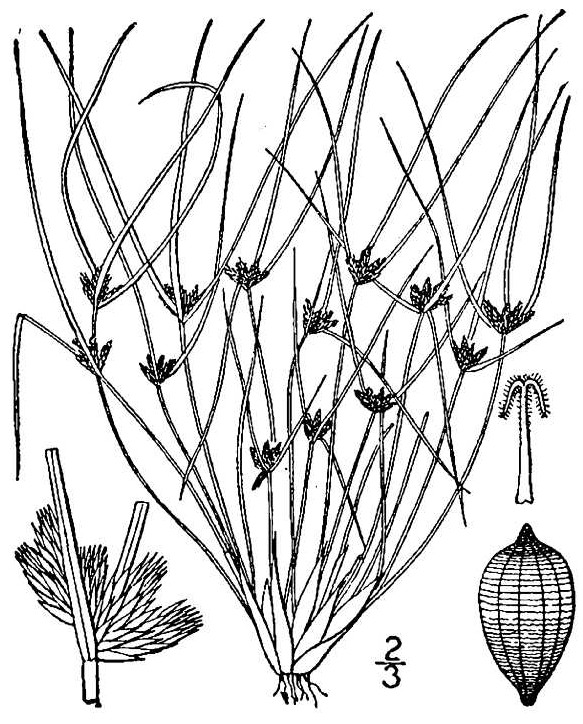

Scientific classification
- Kingdom: Plantae
- Clade: Tracheophytes
- Clade: Angiosperms
- Clade: Monocots
- Clade: Commelinids
- Order: Poales
- Family: Cyperaceae
- Genus: Fimbristylis
- Species: F. vahlii

Binomial name
- Fimbristylis vahlii (Lam.) Link

Synonyms
- Scirpus vahlii

= Fimbristylis vahlii =

Species of grass-like plant

Fimbristylis vahlii is a species of sedge known by the common name Vahl's fimbry. It is native to much of Central America and the southern half of North America, where it grows in wet habitats. F. vahlii is a small, clumping sedge producing rounded stems just a few centimeters high surrounded by curling, thready leaves. At the top of the stem is an inflorescence, which is a cluster of several cylindrical, pointed spikelets surrounded by long, narrow, twisting bracts. The fruit is a tiny achene, about half a millimeter wide.
