= Fimbristylis cephalophora =

Scientific classification
- Kingdom: Plantae
- Clade: Tracheophytes
- Clade: Angiosperms
- Clade: Monocots
- Clade: Commelinids
- Order: Poales
- Family: Cyperaceae
- Genus: Fimbristylis
- Species: F. cephalophora

Binomial name
- Fimbristylis cephalophora F.Muell.

Species of grass-like plant

Fimbristylis cephalophora is a sedge of the family Cyperaceae that is native to Australia.

The annual grass-like or herb sedge typically grows to a height of 0.1 to 0.75 metres (0.3 to 2.5 ft) and has a tufted habit. It blooms between March and August and produces brown flowers.

In Western Australia it is found along creeks, streams and rivers and other damp places in the Kimberley and Pilbara regions where it grows black clay, basaltic loam and sandy soils.
