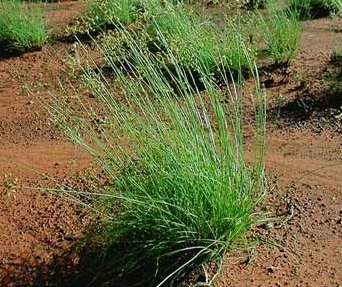

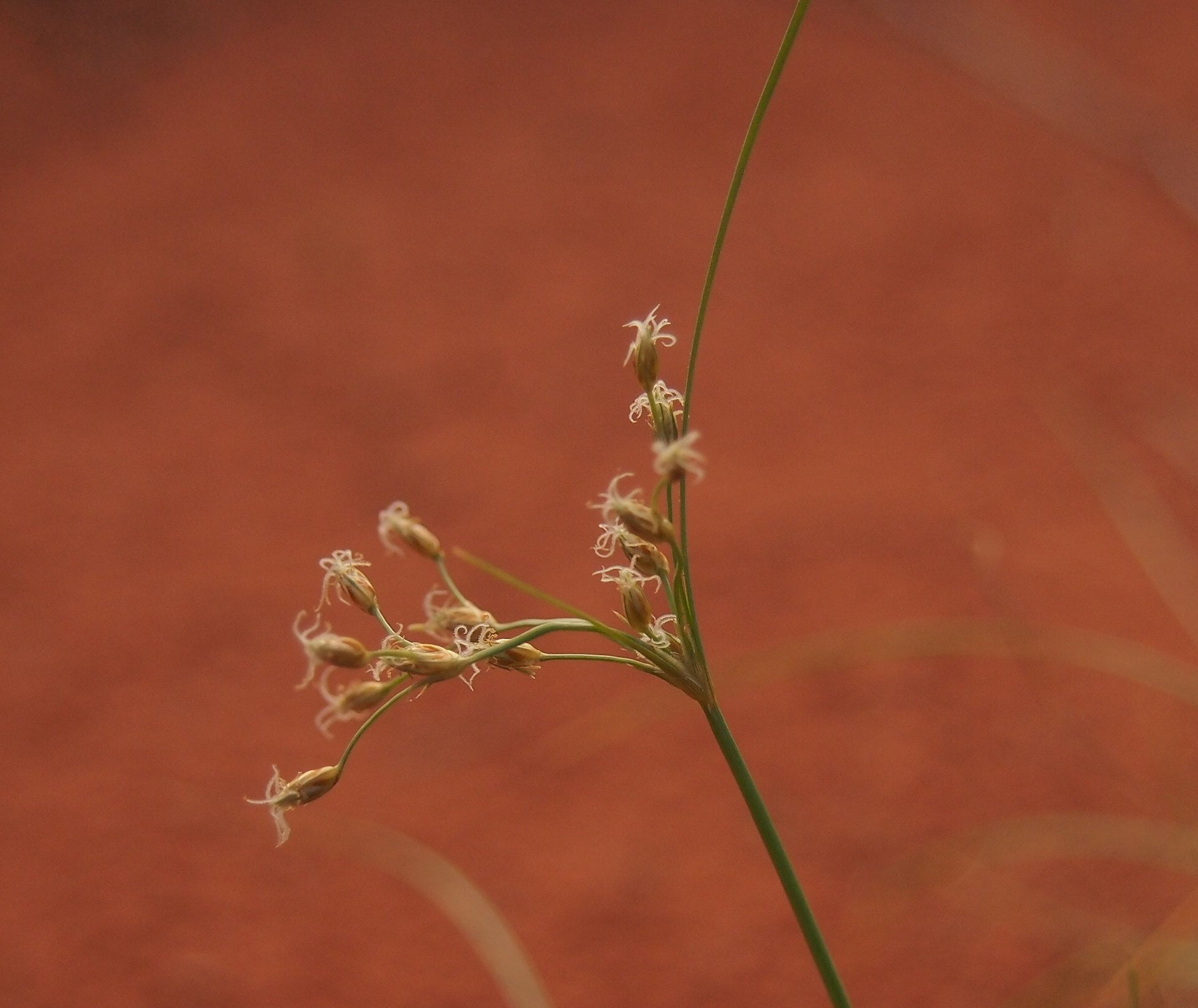

Scientific classification
- Kingdom: Plantae
- Clade: Tracheophytes
- Clade: Angiosperms
- Clade: Monocots
- Clade: Commelinids
- Order: Poales
- Family: Cyperaceae
- Genus: Fimbristylis
- Species: F. dichotoma

Binomial name
- Fimbristylis dichotoma (L.) Vahl

Subspecies and varieties
- see text

Synonyms
- Eleocharis dichotoma (L.) H.Karst.; Isolepis dichotoma (L.) Kunth; Scirpus dichotomus L. (1753) (basionym)

= Fimbristylis dichotoma =

Species of grass-like plant

Fimbristylis dichotoma, commonly known as forked fimbry or eight day grass, is a sedge of the family Cyperaceae that is native to tropical areas.

== Description ==
The annual or perennial plant, 10–80 cm tall, with numerous long stems about 2 mm in diameter, slightly three-angled, compressed below the inflorescence, node-less, smooth and has a tufted habit. The root system is fibrous, wiry, black. Short rhizomes. Leaves numerous, forming a dense tuft at the base of the stem, being at least half as long as the stem.

== Distribution ==
Fimbristylis dichotoma is widely distributed in Asia, Africa and Australia as well as in other parts of the tropics.

== Habitat ==
Fimbristylis dichotoma grows well on wet or even flooded soil; it is also found in uplands where the soil has good water retention. It is also found in swamps, open waste places, grassy roadsides, Imperata cylindrica grasslands and some plantation crops.

== Subdivisions ==
Six subdivisions are accepted.

- Fimbristylis dichotoma subsp. depauperata (R.Br.) J.Kern (synonyms Fimbristylis depauperata R.Br. and F. spirostachya F.Muell. ex Benth.) – Andaman Islands, southeastern China, eastern Malesia, New Guinea, Bismarck Archipelago, Northern Territory, Queensland, and Western Australia
- Fimbristylis dichotoma subsp. dichotoma – tropical and subtropical Americas and Asia, sub-Saharan Africa, Arabian Peninsula, New Guinea, and Australia
- Fimbristylis dichotoma var. floribunda (Miq.) T.Koyama – central and southern Japan and southern Korea
- Fimbristylis dichotoma subsp. glauca (Vahl) T.Koyama – southern India and Sri Lanka
- Fimbristylis dichotoma subsp. ophiticola (Britton) Zavaro – Cuba
- Fimbristylis dichotoma subsp. podocarpa (Nees) T.Koyama – west and central Africa, Madagascar, Indian subcontinent, Indochina, southern China, Korea, Malesia, New Guinea, Northern Territory, and Queensland
