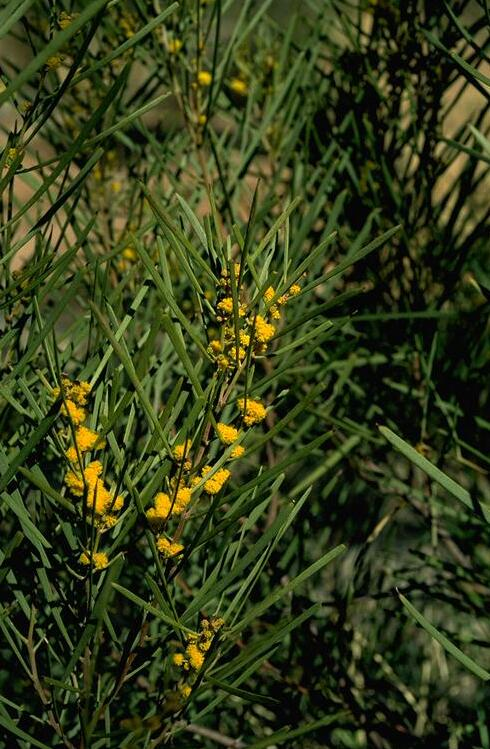
- In Mount Annan Botanic Gardens

Conservation status
- Vulnerable (TPWCA)

- Vulnerable (EPBC Act)

Scientific classification
- Kingdom: Plantae
- Clade: Embryophytes
- Clade: Tracheophytes
- Clade: Spermatophytes
- Clade: Angiosperms
- Clade: Eudicots
- Clade: Rosids
- Order: Fabales
- Family: Fabaceae
- Subfamily: Caesalpinioideae
- Clade: Mimosoid clade
- Genus: Acacia
- Species: A. latzii

Binomial name
- Acacia latzii Maslin
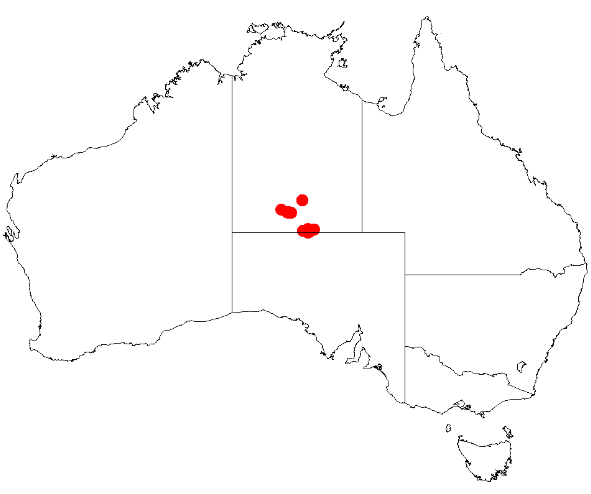
- Occurrence data from AVH

Synonyms
- Racosperma latzii (Maslin) Pedley

= Acacia latzii =

Species of plant

Acacia latzii, also known as Latz's wattle or Tjilpi wattle, is a species of flowering plant in the family Fabaceae and is endemic to the Finke bioregion of Central Australia. It is a shrub or tree with narrowly linear to linear, curved phyllodes, spherical heads of small resinous flowers and linear, leathery pods slightly raised over and constricted between the seeds.

== Description ==
Acacia latzii is a shrub or tree that typically grows to a height of 3–7 m (9.8–23.0 ft) and has branchlets that are more or less glabrous or covered with soft hairs, pressed against the surface The phyllodes are narrowly linear to linear, mostly shallowly curved, 50–100 mm (2.0–3.9 in) long, 2–4 mm (0.079–0.157 in) wide and leathery with a short to hooked tip and many obscure parallel veins. The flowers are borne in two to five spherical heads in racemes 15–50 mm (0.59–1.97 in) long on peduncles 5–9 mm (0.20–0.35 in) long, each head about 4 mm (0.16 in) in diameter with 13 to 18 small resinous flowers. Flowering occurs from April to August and the pods are linear, up to 150 mm (5.9 in) long, 5–6 mm (0.20–0.24 in) wide, leathery and flat, except slightly raised over and constricted between the seeds. The seeds are oblong, about 5.5 mm (0.22 in) long, dul brown to black with a tiny aril on the end.

== Taxonomy ==
Acacia latzii was first formally described in 1980 by Bruce Maslin in the Journal of the Adelaide Botanic Gardens from specimens collected on the Beddome Range on New Crown Station in the Northern Territory by Peter Kenneth Latz in 1977. The specific epithet honours Peter Latz, "upon whose fine collections...the description is based".

== Distribution and habitat ==
Latz's wattle is found growing in skeletal alkaline soil in gullies and rocky slopes in open shrubland, sometimes with Acacia aneura, but is only knopwn from Bacon and Beddome Ranges in the southern Northern Territory and South Australia near the Northern Territory border.

== Conservation status ==
Acacia lutzii is listed as 'threatened' under the Australian Government Environment Protection and Biodiversity Conservation Act 1999 and the Northern Territory Government Territory Parks and Wildlife Conservation Act. It is threatened by

- increased fire exposure associated with Buffel Grass invasion;
- seedling loss from browsing and trampling by cattle and feral herbivores;
- vulnerable to decline due its small population and its fragmented distribution;
- altered rainfall patterns (due to climate change) which may affect adult survivorship and decrease the rare recruitment events.
