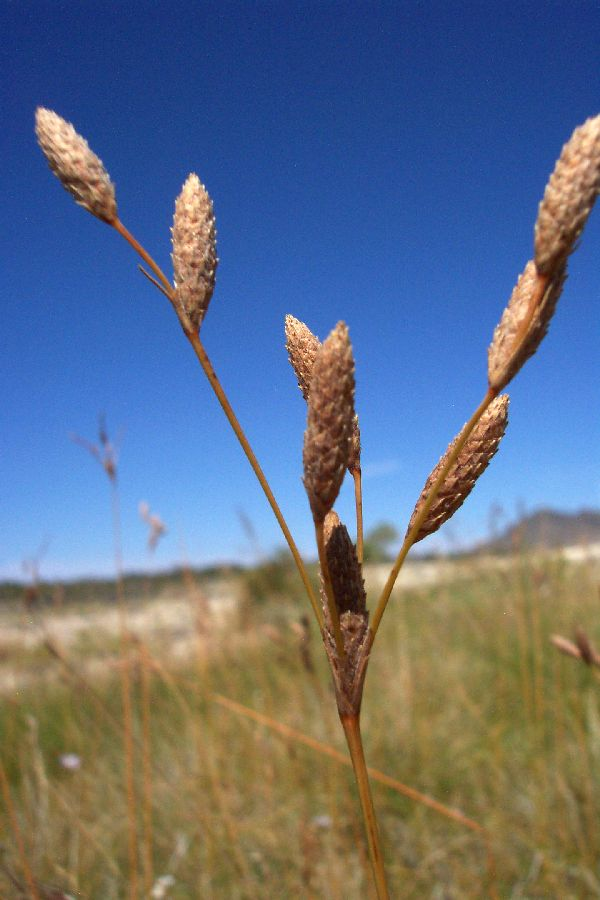

Conservation status
- Apparently Secure (NatureServe)

Scientific classification
- Kingdom: Plantae
- Clade: Tracheophytes
- Clade: Angiosperms
- Clade: Monocots
- Clade: Commelinids
- Order: Poales
- Family: Cyperaceae
- Genus: Fimbristylis
- Species: F. thermalis

Binomial name
- Fimbristylis thermalis S.Wats.

Synonyms
- Iria thermalis (S.Watson) Kuntze

= Fimbristylis thermalis =

Hot springs fimbry

Species of grass-like plant

Fimbristylis thermalis is a species of fimbry known by the common name hot springs fimbry. It is native to the southwestern United States and northern Mexico. It has been reported from Baja California, California, Arizona, Nevada, Utah and Coahuila.

Fimbristylis thermalis grows in alkaline mud and sand, especially around hot springs and mineral-rich seeps. This is a thick-stemmed sedge which grows singly or in clumps and reaches maximum heights over a meter. It has a long rhizome system. It has short, flat, spiral-arranged leaves. At the top of the stem is an inflorescence of ovate, pointed spikelets, each on a long peduncle. The spikelet has many hairy bracts. The fruit is a shiny brown achene one to two millimeters long.
