= Fimbristylis macassarensis =

Scientific classification
- Kingdom: Plantae
- Clade: Tracheophytes
- Clade: Angiosperms
- Clade: Monocots
- Clade: Commelinids
- Order: Poales
- Family: Cyperaceae
- Genus: Fimbristylis
- Species: F. macassarensis

Binomial name
- Fimbristylis macassarensis Steud.

Species of grass-like plant

Fimbristylis macassarensis is a sedge of the family Cyperaceae that is native to Australia.

The annual grass-like or herb sedge typically grows to a height of 0.06 to 0.4 metres (0.20 to 1.31 ft) and has a tufted habit. It blooms between February and June and produces green-brown flowers.

In Western Australia it is found on along creeks and rivers and other damp places in the Kimberley region where it grows in red sandy-clay soils often over basalt.
