= Fimbristylis leucocolea =

Scientific classification
- Kingdom: Plantae
- Clade: Tracheophytes
- Clade: Angiosperms
- Clade: Monocots
- Clade: Commelinids
- Order: Poales
- Family: Cyperaceae
- Genus: Fimbristylis
- Species: F. leucocolea

Binomial name
- Fimbristylis leucocolea Benth.

Species of grass-like plant

Fimbristylis leucocolea is a sedge of the family Cyperaceae that is native to Australia.

The annual grass-like or herb sedge typically grows to a height of 0.1 to 0.35 metres (0.33 to 1.15 ft) and has a tufted habit. It blooms between February and June and produces green-brown flowers.

In Western Australia it is found on rocky sandstone hills in the Kimberley region where it grows in skeletal red sandy-clay soils.
