= Fimbristylis denudata =

Scientific classification
- Kingdom: Plantae
- Clade: Tracheophytes
- Clade: Angiosperms
- Clade: Monocots
- Clade: Commelinids
- Order: Poales
- Family: Cyperaceae
- Genus: Fimbristylis
- Species: F. denudata

Binomial name
- Fimbristylis denudata R.Br.

Species of grass-like plant

Fimbristylis denudata is a sedge of the family Cyperaceae that is native to Australia.

The rhizomatous perennial grass-like or herb sedge typically grows to a height of 0.15 to 0.25 metres (0.49 to 0.82 ft) with a width of around 0.15 metres (0.49 ft) and has a tufted habit. It blooms between May and October and produces green-brown flowers.

In Western Australia it is found on floodplains and along creeks and streams in the Kimberley region.
