= Fimbristylis cardiocarpa =

Scientific classification
- Kingdom: Plantae
- Clade: Tracheophytes
- Clade: Angiosperms
- Clade: Monocots
- Clade: Commelinids
- Order: Poales
- Family: Cyperaceae
- Genus: Fimbristylis
- Species: F. cardiocarpa

Binomial name
- Fimbristylis cardiocarpa F.Muell.

Species of grass-like plant

Fimbristylis cardiocarpa is a sedge of the family Cyperaceae that is native to Australia.

The annual grass-like or herb sedge typically grows to a height of 0.1 to 0.5 metres (0.33 to 1.64 ft) and has a tufted habit with a diameter of about 0.3 m (1.0 ft). It blooms between February and July and produces green-brown flowers.

In Western Australia it is found in the Kimberley region where it grows in gravelly lateritic red clay soils around sandstone.
