= Fimbristylis lanceolata =

Scientific classification
- Kingdom: Plantae
- Clade: Tracheophytes
- Clade: Angiosperms
- Clade: Monocots
- Clade: Commelinids
- Order: Poales
- Family: Cyperaceae
- Genus: Fimbristylis
- Species: F. lanceolata

Binomial name
- Fimbristylis lanceolata C.B.Clarke

Species of grass-like plant

Fimbristylis lanceolata is a sedge of the family Cyperaceae that is native to Australia.

The rhizomatous perennial grass-like or herb sedge typically grows to a height of 0.5 to 0.8 metres (1.64 to 2.62 ft) and has a tufted habit. It blooms between May and June and produces brown flowers.

In Western Australia it is found in the Kimberley region where it grows in alluvial soils.
