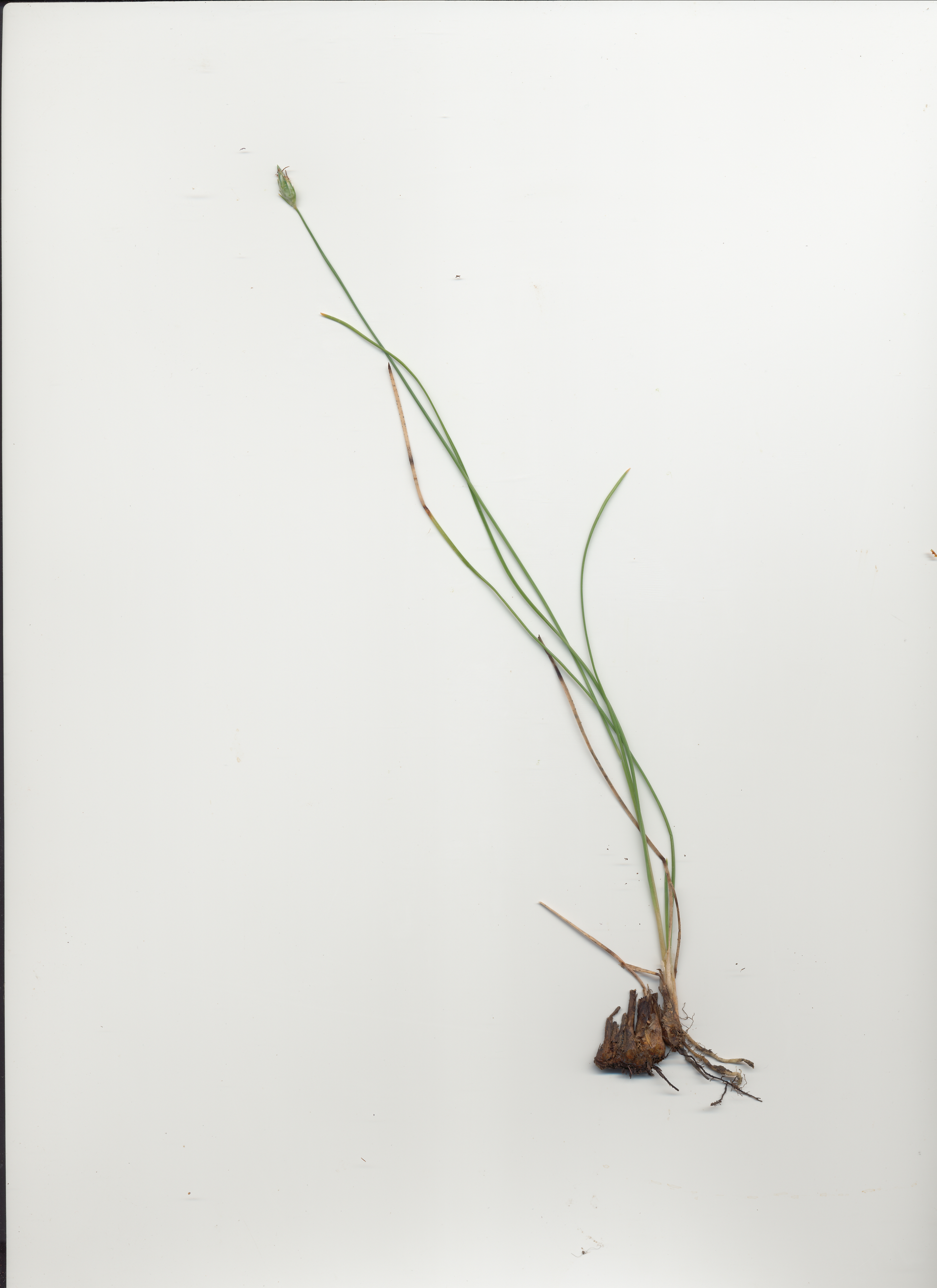
- Abildgaardia ovata

Scientific classification
- Kingdom: Plantae
- Clade: Tracheophytes
- Clade: Angiosperms
- Clade: Monocots
- Clade: Commelinids
- Order: Poales
- Family: Cyperaceae
- Tribe: Abildgaardieae
- Genus: Abildgaardia; Vahl

Species
- See text.

= Abildgaardia =

Genus of plants

Abildgaardia is a genus of flowering plant in the family Cyperaceae, widely distributed in the tropics and subtropics. The genus was established by Martin Vahl in 1805.

== Species ==
As of May 2026, Plants of the World Online accepted the following species:

- Abildgaardia fusiformis (K.Wangwasit & D.A.Simpson) Larridon
- Abildgaardia longistipitata (Tang & F.T. Wang) B.Z. Li & S.R. Zhang
- Abildgaardia macrantha (Boeckeler) Goetgh.
- Abildgaardia mexicana (Palla) Kral
- Abildgaardia odontocarpa (S.T.Blake) K.L.Wilson & J.J.Bruhl
- Abildgaardia ovata (Burm.f.) Kral
- Abildgaardia oxystachya (F.Muell.) K.L.Wilson & J.J.Bruhl
- Abildgaardia pachyptera (S.T.Blake) K.L.Wilson & J.J.Bruhl
- Abildgaardia schoenoides R.Br.
- Abildgaardia triflora (L.) Abeyw.
