= Fimbristylis helicophylla =

Twisted leaf fimbristylis

Conservation status
- Priority Two — Poorly Known Taxa (DEC)

Scientific classification
- Kingdom: Plantae
- Clade: Tracheophytes
- Clade: Angiosperms
- Clade: Monocots
- Clade: Commelinids
- Order: Poales
- Family: Cyperaceae
- Genus: Fimbristylis
- Species: F. helicophylla

Binomial name
- Fimbristylis helicophylla Rye, R.L.Barrett & M.D.Barrett

Species of grass-like plant

Fimbristylis helicophylla, commonly known as twisted leaf fimbristylis, is a sedge of the family Cyperaceae that is native a small area in the Kimberley region of Western Australia.
