= Fimbristylis dictyocolea =

Conservation status
- Priority One — Poorly Known Taxa (DEC)

Scientific classification
- Kingdom: Plantae
- Clade: Tracheophytes
- Clade: Angiosperms
- Clade: Monocots
- Clade: Commelinids
- Order: Poales
- Family: Cyperaceae
- Genus: Fimbristylis
- Species: F. dictyocolea

Binomial name
- Fimbristylis dictyocolea S.T.Blake

Species of grass-like plant

Fimbristylis dictyocolea is a sedge of the family Cyperaceae that is native to Australia.

The rhizomatous perennial grass-like or herb sedge typically grows to a height of 0.5 to 0.8 metres (1.6 to 2.6 ft) and has a tufted habit. It blooms between February and June and produces green-brown flowers.

In Western Australia it is found in and around swamps, creeks and pools of water in the Kimberley region.
