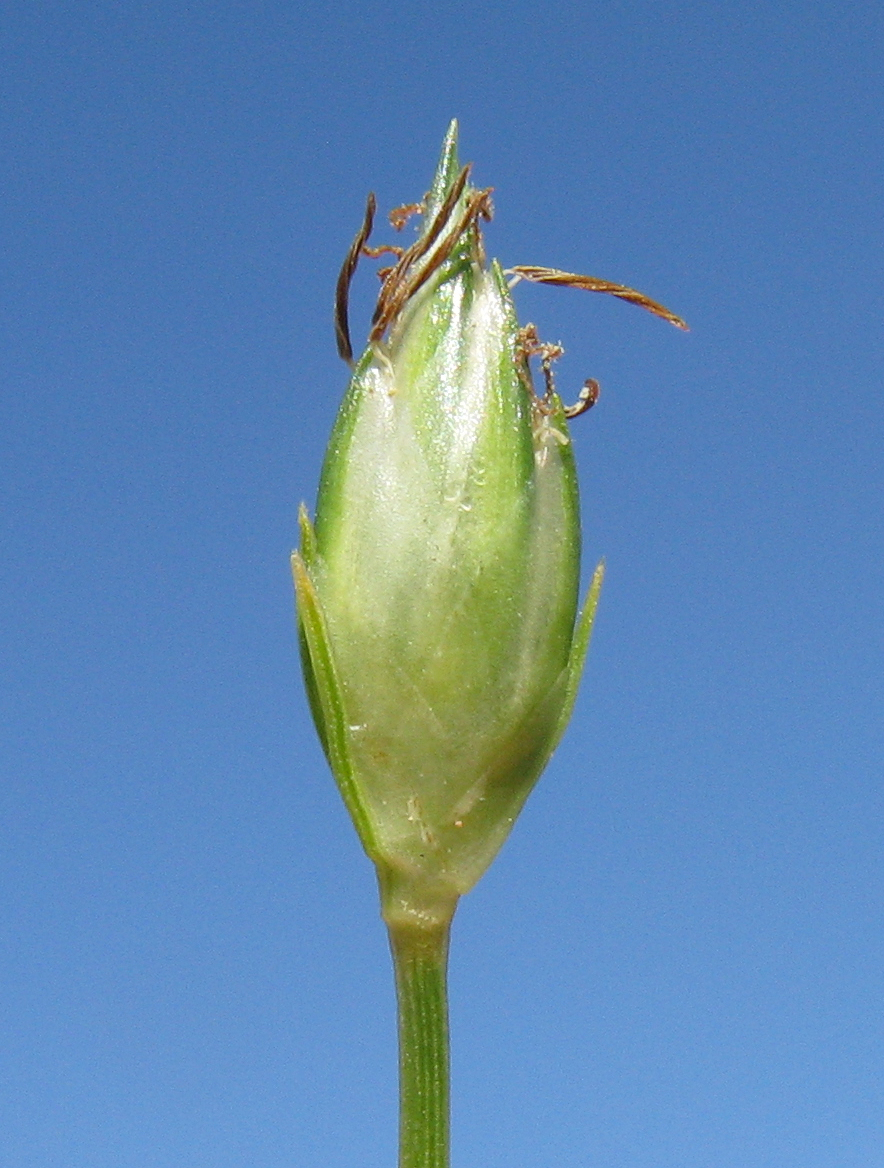

Conservation status
- Least Concern (IUCN 3.1)

- Secure (NatureServe)

Scientific classification
- Kingdom: Plantae
- Clade: Tracheophytes
- Clade: Angiosperms
- Clade: Monocots
- Clade: Commelinids
- Order: Poales
- Family: Cyperaceae
- Genus: Abildgaardia
- Species: A. ovata

Binomial name
- Abildgaardia ovata (Burm.f.) Kral

Synonyms
- Abildgaardia compressa J.Presl & C.Presl; Abildgaardia indica (Rich.) Nees; Abildgaardia javanensis Gand.; Abildgaardia monostachya (L.) Vahl; Abildgaardia rottboelliana Nees; Carex ovata Burm.f.; Cyperus caribaeus Pers., nom. illeg.; Cyperus indicus Rich.; Cyperus monostachyos L.; Fimbristylis compressa Fern.-Vill.; Fimbristylis monostachya (L.) Hassk.; Fimbristylis ovata (Burm.f.) J.Kern; Iria caribea Steud.; Iria indica (Rich.) Schult.; Iria monostachya (L.) Kuntze; Scirpus monostachyus (L.) Kuntze; Scirpus schoenoides Roxb., nom. illeg.; Xyris brasiliensis Spreng.

= Abildgaardia ovata =

Species of plant

Abildgaardia ovata, synonyms including Abildgaardia monostachya and Fimbristylis ovata, is a perennial herb of the family Cyperaceae. It is a widespread species that can be found in West, Southern and East Africa, Florida, Mexico, the Caribbean and in some countries of Latin America.

== Description ==
Abildgaardia ovata are perennial plants that grow up to 40–70 cm (16–28 in) long. It is common to find species with one spikelet at the tip of its scapes but can reach up to three spikelets that are laterally compressed and of length between 7–12 mm (0.28–0.47 in). A short rhizome with hardened and leafy bas, it grows in wooded and wet grasslands and as a weed in Asia and in Florida.
