= Fimbristylis acicularis =

Scientific classification
- Kingdom: Plantae
- Clade: Tracheophytes
- Clade: Angiosperms
- Clade: Monocots
- Clade: Commelinids
- Order: Poales
- Family: Cyperaceae
- Genus: Fimbristylis
- Species: F. acicularis

Binomial name
- Fimbristylis acicularis R.Br.

Species of grass-like plant

Fimbristylis acicularis is a sedge of the family Cyperaceae that is native to northern and north eastern Australia.

== Description ==
The rhizomatous perennial grass-like or herb sedge typically grows to a height of 0.15 to 0.25 metres (0.49 to 0.82 ft) and has a tufted habit. It blooms between April and July and produces green flowers.

== Taxonomy ==
The species was first described by the botanist Robert Brown in 1810 as part of the work Prodromus florae Novae Hollandiae et insulae Van-Diemen, exhibens characteres plantarum quas annis. There are many synonyms including; Scirpus acicularis, Fimbristylis australica, Isolepis cochleata, Abildgaardia brevifolia, Iriha acicularia, Fimbristylis setacea and Iria acicularia. The specific epithet, acicularis, is derived from Latin and means "needle-shaped".

== Distribution ==
In Western Australia it is found in coastal areas of the Kimberley region situated in swamps and along creeks and in other damp areas with its range extending across coastal regions of the top end of the Northern Territory and coastal areas of Queensland.
