= Fimbristylis corynocarya =

Scientific classification
- Kingdom: Plantae
- Clade: Tracheophytes
- Clade: Angiosperms
- Clade: Monocots
- Clade: Commelinids
- Order: Poales
- Family: Cyperaceae
- Genus: Fimbristylis
- Species: F. corynocarya

Binomial name
- Fimbristylis corynocarya F.Muell.

Species of grass-like plant

Fimbristylis corynocarya is a sedge of the family Cyperaceae that is native to Australia.

The annual or perennial grass-like or herb sedge typically grows to a height of 0.3 to 0.5 metres (0.98 to 1.64 ft) and has a tufted habit. It blooms between April and May and produces green-brown flowers.
