= Fimbristylis acuminata =

Pointed fimbristylis

Conservation status
- Least Concern (IUCN 3.1)

Scientific classification
- Kingdom: Plantae
- Clade: Tracheophytes
- Clade: Angiosperms
- Clade: Monocots
- Clade: Commelinids
- Order: Poales
- Family: Cyperaceae
- Genus: Fimbristylis
- Species: F. acuminata

Binomial name
- Fimbristylis acuminata Vahl

Species of grass-like plant

Fimbristylis acuminata, commonly known as pointed fimbristylis, is a sedge of the family Cyperaceae that is found in tropical areas extending from India, through parts of South East Asia and into northern Australia.

The rhizomatous perennial grass-like or herb sedge typically grows to a height of 0.3 metres (0.98 ft) and has a tufted habit. It blooms between May and August and produces brown flowers.

In Western Australia it is found along creeks and in other damp areas in the Kimberley region where it grows in muddy-loamy soils.
