= Fimbristylis elegans =

Scientific classification
- Kingdom: Plantae
- Clade: Tracheophytes
- Clade: Angiosperms
- Clade: Monocots
- Clade: Commelinids
- Order: Poales
- Family: Cyperaceae
- Genus: Fimbristylis
- Species: F. elegans

Binomial name
- Fimbristylis elegans S.T.Blake

Species of grass-like plant

Fimbristylis elegans is a sedge of the family Cyperaceae that is native to Australia.

The annual grass-like or herb sedge typically grows to a height of 0.1 to 0.3 metres (0.33 to 0.98 ft) and has a tufted habit. It blooms between April and July and produces brown flowers.

In Western Australia it is found along creeks and streams in the Kimberley and Pilbara regions where it grows in sandy soils around limestone.
