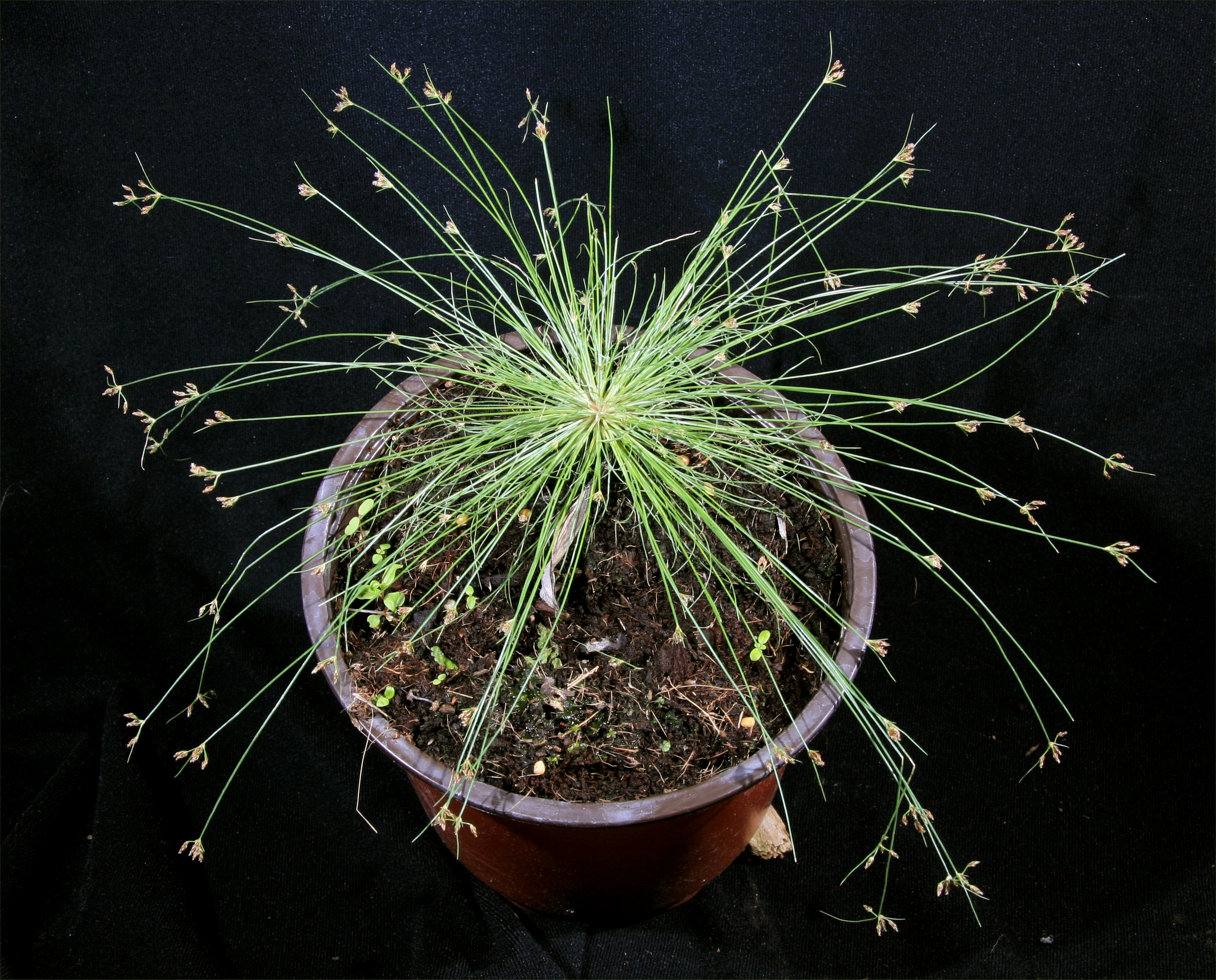

Scientific classification
- Kingdom: Plantae
- Clade: Tracheophytes
- Clade: Angiosperms
- Clade: Monocots
- Clade: Commelinids
- Order: Poales
- Family: Cyperaceae
- Genus: Fimbristylis
- Species: F. cinnamometorum

Binomial name
- Fimbristylis cinnamometorum (Vahl) Kunth

= Fimbristylis cinnamometorum =

Species of grass-like plant

Fimbristylis cinnamometorum is a sedge of the family Cyperaceae that is native to Australia.

The rhizomatous perennial grass-like or herb sedge typically grows to a height of 0.4 to 0.6 metres (1.3 to 2.0 ft) and has a tufted habit. It blooms between April and June and produces brown flowers.

In Western Australia it is found in and around swamps, pools along drainage lines and clay-pans and other damp places in the Kimberley region where it grows in loamy soils around sandstone and quartzite.
