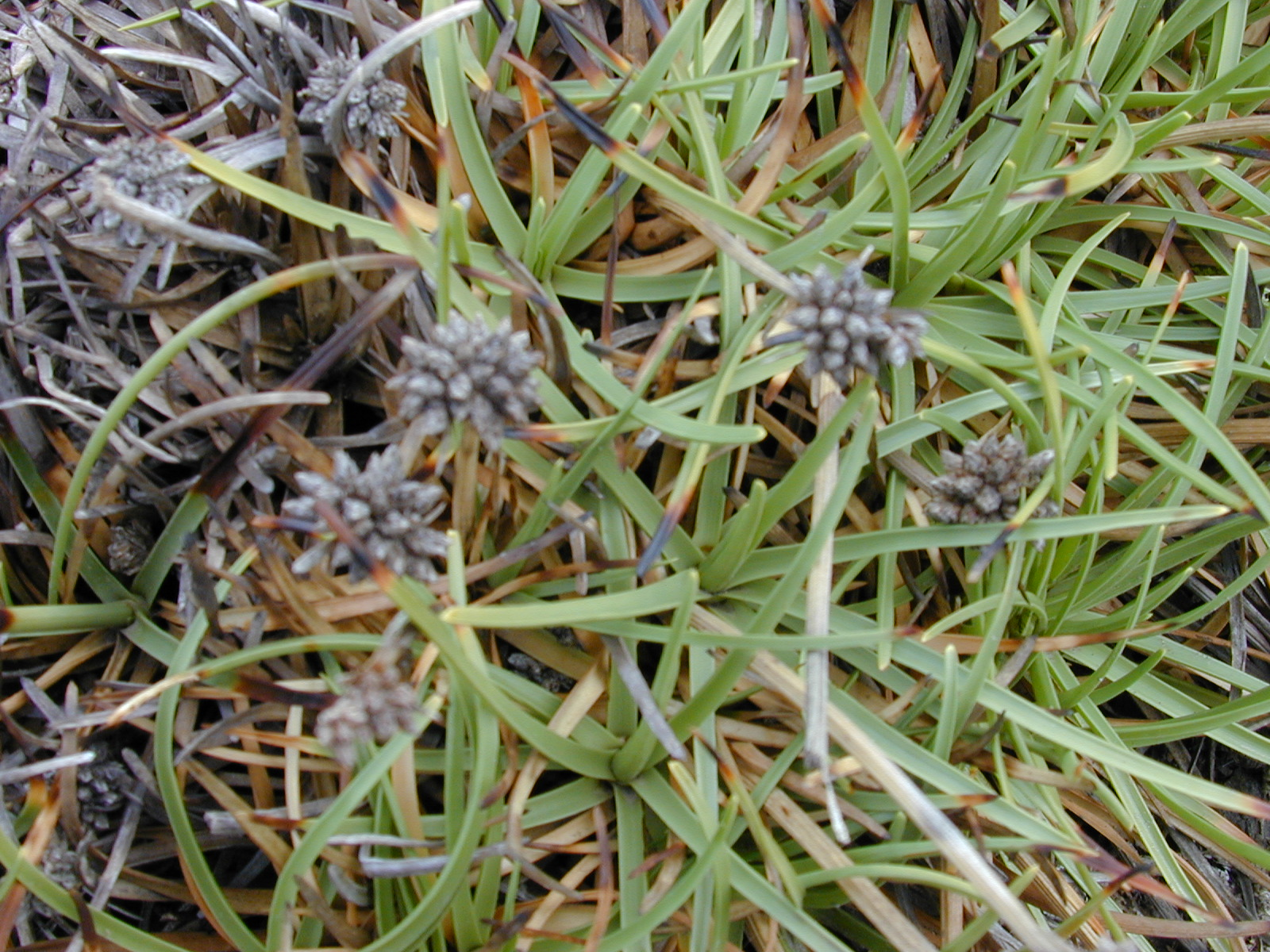

Conservation status
- Least Concern (IUCN 3.1)

Scientific classification
- Kingdom: Plantae
- Clade: Tracheophytes
- Clade: Angiosperms
- Clade: Monocots
- Clade: Commelinids
- Order: Poales
- Family: Cyperaceae
- Genus: Fimbristylis
- Species: F. cymosa

Binomial name
- Fimbristylis cymosa R.Br.

Subspecies
- Fimbristylis cymosa subsp. cymosa; Fimbristylis cymosa subsp. umbellatocapitata (Hillebr.) T.Koyama

Synonyms
- Fimbristylis cymosa var. typica Domin; Iria cymosa (R.Br.) Kuntze; Scirpus cymosus (R.Br.) Poir.

= Fimbristylis cymosa =

Tropical fimbry

Species of grass-like plant

Fimbristylis cymosa, commonly known as tropical fimbry, or St. John's sedge, is a sedge of the family Cyperaceae. It has a wide distribution in tropical and subtropical regions of the Americas, sub-Saharan Africa, Asia, Australasia, and the Pacific.

The rhizomatous perennial grass-like or herb sedge typically grows to a height of 0.25 to 0.8 metres (1 to 3 ft). It blooms between February and September and produces brown flowers.

In Western Australia it is found near the coast, on dunes and behind mangroves in the Kimberley region where it grows in sandy-clay alluvium around basalt or sandstone rocks.
