= Fimbristylis caespitosa =

Fringe-rush

Scientific classification
- Kingdom: Plantae
- Clade: Embryophytes
- Clade: Tracheophytes
- Clade: Spermatophytes
- Clade: Angiosperms
- Clade: Monocots
- Clade: Commelinids
- Order: Poales
- Family: Cyperaceae
- Genus: Fimbristylis
- Species: F. caespitosa

Binomial name
- Fimbristylis caespitosa R.Br.
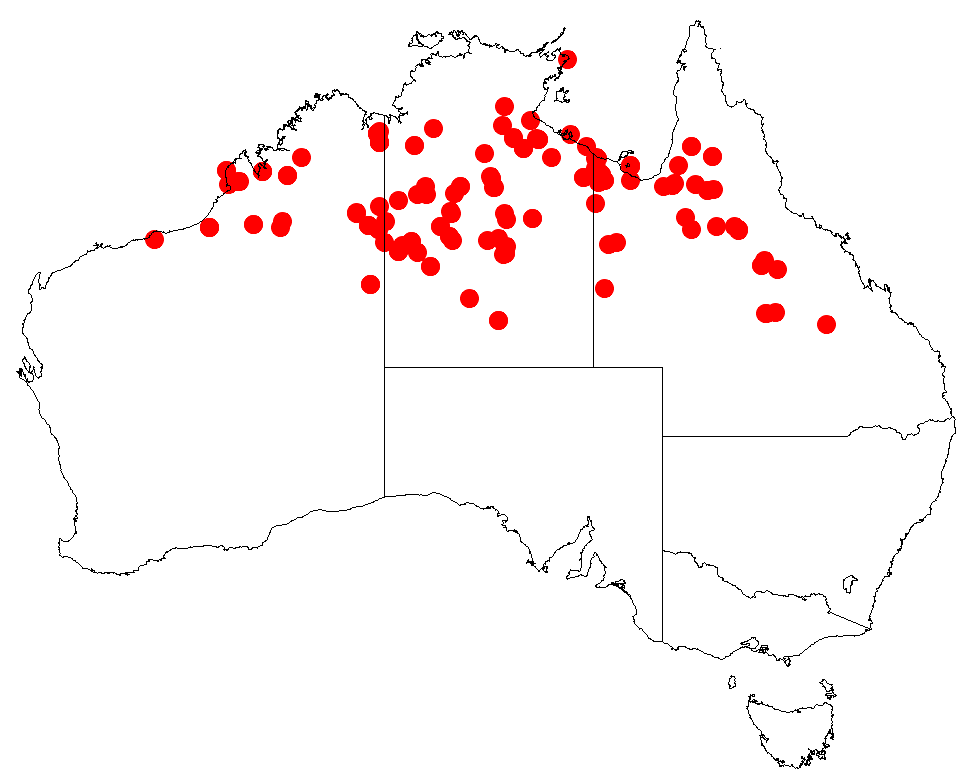
- Occurrence data from Australasian Virtual Herbarium

Species of grass-like plant

Fimbristylis caespitosa, commonly known as fringe-rush, is a sedge of the family Cyperaceae that is native to northern parts of Australia.

The perennial grass-like or herb sedge typically grows to a height of 0.3 to 0.6 metres (0.98 to 1.97 ft) and has a tufted habit. It blooms between December and August and produces green-brown flowers.

The plants has a life span of between six and ten years and is able to produce seeds after two to three years. It can resprout basally from a lignotuber following fires.

In Western Australia it is found in and around swamps and claypans and on sandstone hills in the Kimberley and Pilbara regions where it grows in sandy soils. It is also found throughout the central of the Northern Territory between Alice Springs and Katherine and parts of Queensland.
