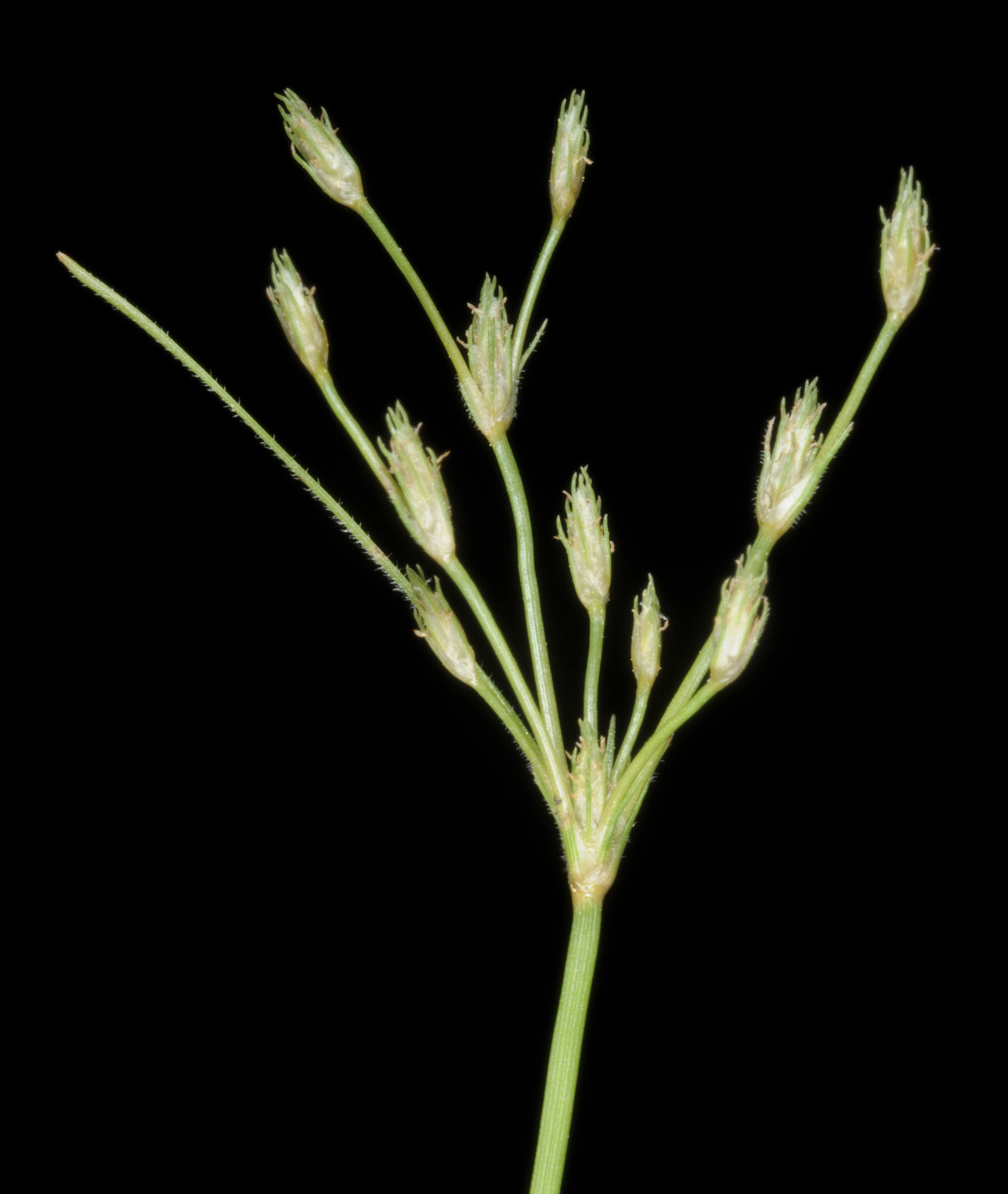

Scientific classification
- Kingdom: Plantae
- Clade: Tracheophytes
- Clade: Angiosperms
- Clade: Monocots
- Clade: Commelinids
- Order: Poales
- Family: Cyperaceae
- Genus: Fimbristylis
- Species: F. velata

Binomial name
- Fimbristylis velata R.Br.

Synonyms
- Scirpus velatus (R.Br.) Poir.; Iria velata (R.Br.) Kuntze; Fimbristylis squarrosa var. velata (R.Br.) C.B.Clarke ex Cheeseman

= Fimbristylis velata =

Species of plant

Fimbristylis velata is a species of sedge native to the North Island of New Zealand and Australia, where it is found in Western Australia, New South Wales, the Northern Territory, Queensland, Victoria, and South Australia.

== Taxonomy and naming ==
F. velata was first described in 1810 by Robert Brown from a specimen he found at Port Jackson, Sydney. Australian and New Zealand authorities accept it as a species, though Plants of the World online considers it to be a synonym of Fimbristylis squarrosa var. esquarrosa Makino.

The specific epithet, velata, is a Latin participle, velatus, -a, -um, which describes some part of the plant as being "covered" or "partially concealed from view".

== Description ==
Fimbristylis velata is a small densely tufted annual. Its leaves are shorter than its culms. There is no ligule. The compound inflorescence has many solitary spikelets on branches which are up to 5 cm long. The flowers have one stamen with an anther 2 -3 mm long. The style is bifid, with a sparse fringe of hairs above, while at the base there is a whorl of long whitish hairs closely pressed to the nut and partially covering it. The nut is biconvex, straw-coloured and shining.

It flowers from spring to summer and typically grows in moist places.
