= Fimbristylis compacta =

Scientific classification
- Kingdom: Plantae
- Clade: Tracheophytes
- Clade: Angiosperms
- Clade: Monocots
- Clade: Commelinids
- Order: Poales
- Family: Cyperaceae
- Genus: Fimbristylis
- Species: F. compacta

Binomial name
- Fimbristylis compacta Turrill

Species of grass-like plant

Fimbristylis compacta is a sedge of the family Cyperaceae that is native to Australia.

The grass-like or herb sedge blooms between June and July and produces brown flowers.

In Western Australia it is found along creeks and in and around swamps in the Kimberley region where it grows in sandy soils.
