= Fimbristylis costiglumis =

Scientific classification
- Kingdom: Plantae
- Clade: Tracheophytes
- Clade: Angiosperms
- Clade: Monocots
- Clade: Commelinids
- Order: Poales
- Family: Cyperaceae
- Genus: Fimbristylis
- Species: F. costiglumis

Binomial name
- Fimbristylis costiglumis Domin

Species of grass-like plant

Fimbristylis costiglumis is a sedge of the family Cyperaceae that is native to the Kimberley region of Western Australia.
