= Fimbristylis microcarya =

Scientific classification
- Kingdom: Plantae
- Clade: Tracheophytes
- Clade: Angiosperms
- Clade: Monocots
- Clade: Commelinids
- Order: Poales
- Family: Cyperaceae
- Genus: Fimbristylis
- Species: F. microcarya

Binomial name
- Fimbristylis microcarya F.Muell.

Species of grass-like plant

Fimbristylis microcarya is a sedge of the family Cyperaceae that is native to Australia.

The annual grass-like or herb sedge typically grows to a height of 5 to 40 centimetres (1.97 to 15.75 in) and has a tufted habit. It blooms between February and July and produces brown flowers.

In Western Australia, it is found in and around swamps and claypans and along creeks and rivers in the Kimberley and Pilbara regions where it grows in brown clay-sand or red loam soils.
