= Fimbristylis aestivalis =

Summer fimbry

Scientific classification
- Kingdom: Plantae
- Clade: Tracheophytes
- Clade: Angiosperms
- Clade: Monocots
- Clade: Commelinids
- Order: Poales
- Family: Cyperaceae
- Genus: Fimbristylis
- Species: F. aestivalis

Binomial name
- Fimbristylis aestivalis (Retz.) Vahl

Species of grass-like plant

Fimbristylis aestivalis commonly known as summer fimbry, is a sedge of the family Cyperaceae that is native to Australia. The specific epithet, aestivalis, is derived from Latin and means "pertaining to the summer".

The annual grass-like or herb sedge typically grows to a height of 0.07 to 0.09 metres (0.23 to 0.30 ft) and has a tufted habit. It blooms between June and July and produces brown flowers.

In Western Australia it is found along creeks and in other damp areas in the Kimberley region where it grows in alluvium.
