= Fimbristylis depauperata =

Scientific classification
- Kingdom: Plantae
- Clade: Tracheophytes
- Clade: Angiosperms
- Clade: Monocots
- Clade: Commelinids
- Order: Poales
- Family: Cyperaceae
- Genus: Fimbristylis
- Species: F. depauperata

Binomial name
- Fimbristylis depauperata R.Br.

Species of grass-like plant

Fimbristylis depauperata is a sedge of the family Cyperaceae that is native to Australia.

The annual grass-like or herb sedge typically grows to a height of 0.1 to 0.5 metres (0.33 to 1.64 ft) and has a tufted habit. It blooms between February and August and produces green-brown flowers.

In Western Australia it is found around swamps, seepage areas and along creeks and streams in the Kimberley region where it grows in gravelly sandy-clay soils often containing laterite.
