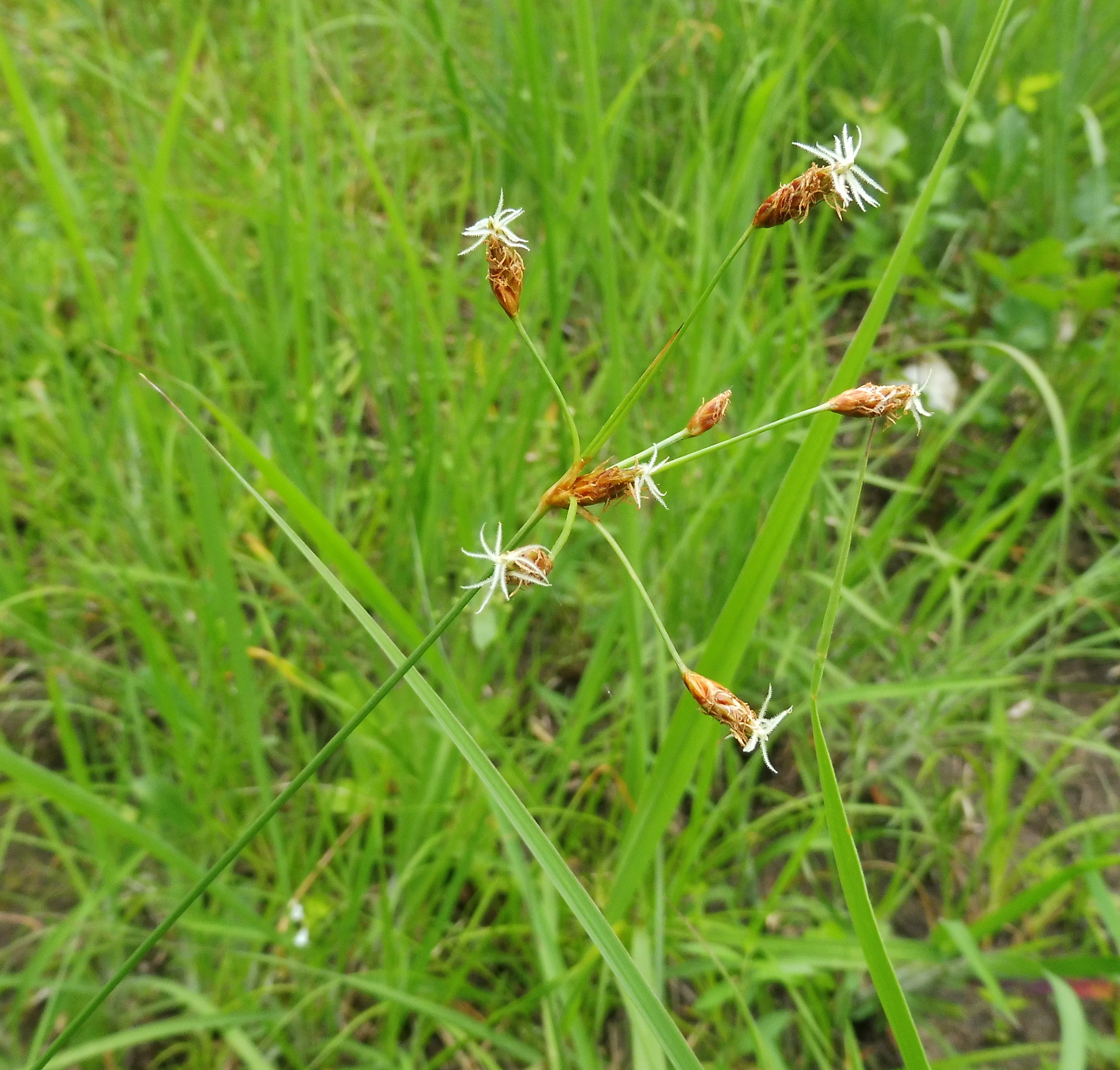
- Variety puberula in flower

Scientific classification
- Kingdom: Plantae
- Clade: Tracheophytes
- Clade: Angiosperms
- Clade: Monocots
- Clade: Commelinids
- Order: Poales
- Family: Cyperaceae
- Genus: Fimbristylis
- Species: F. puberula

Binomial name
- Fimbristylis puberula (Michx.) Vahl

= Fimbristylis puberula =

Species of grass-like plant

Fimbristylis puberula, commonly called hairy fimbry, is a species of flowering plant in the sedge family (Cyperaceae). It is native to North America, where it has a widespread, but patchy, distribution. The largest populations are in the Southeastern Coastal Plain and the eastern Great Plains. Its natural habitat is in prairies, savannas, and glades. It can be found on both basic and acidic soil.

It is a perennial that produces fruits in late spring and early summer. It has historically been confused with the similar-looking Fimbristylis caroliniana, which is restricted to coastal areas.

== Taxonomy ==
Two varieties are recognized. They are:

- F. puberula var. interior - Restricted to the southwestern U.S. and Great Plains
- F. puberula var. puberula - Widespread in the central and eastern U.S., extending into Ontario, Canada
