= Isochorismatase =

Class of enzymes

Identifiers
- EC no.: 3.3.2.1
- CAS no.: 37288-64-5

Databases
- BRENDA: enzyme data
- ExPASy: NiceZyme view
- KEGG: enzyme entry
- MetaCyc: metabolic pathway
- Rhea: reactions
- PDB structures: RCSB PDB PDBe PDBsum
- Gene Ontology: AmiGO / QuickGO
Search
- PMC: articles
- PubMed: articles
- NCBI: proteins

Isochorismatase (EC 3.3.2.1) is an enzyme that catalyzes the chemical reaction

isochorismic acid
H_{2}O
2,3-dihydroxy-2,3-dihydrobenzoic acid
+
pyruvic acid

The enzyme characterised from Aerobacter aerogenes and Escherichia coli hydrolyses isochorismic acid to (2S,3S)-2,3-dihydroxy-2,3-dihydrobenzoic acid and pyruvic acid, as part of the biosynthesis of siderophores such as enterobactin. 2,3-Dihydroxybenzoic acid is a competitive inhibitor of the enzyme.

This enzyme is a hydrolase, specifically one acting on ether bonds (ether hydrolases). The systematic name of this enzyme class is isochorismate pyruvate-hydrolase. Other names in common use include 2,3-dihydro-2,3-dihydroxybenzoate synthase, 2,3-dihydroxy-2,3-dihydrobenzoate synthase, and 2,3-dihydroxy-2,3-dihydrobenzoic synthase.

== Structural studies ==
As of late 2007, 3 structures have been solved for this class of enzymes, with PDB accession codes PDB: 1NF8, PDB: 1NF9, and PDB: 2FQ1.
