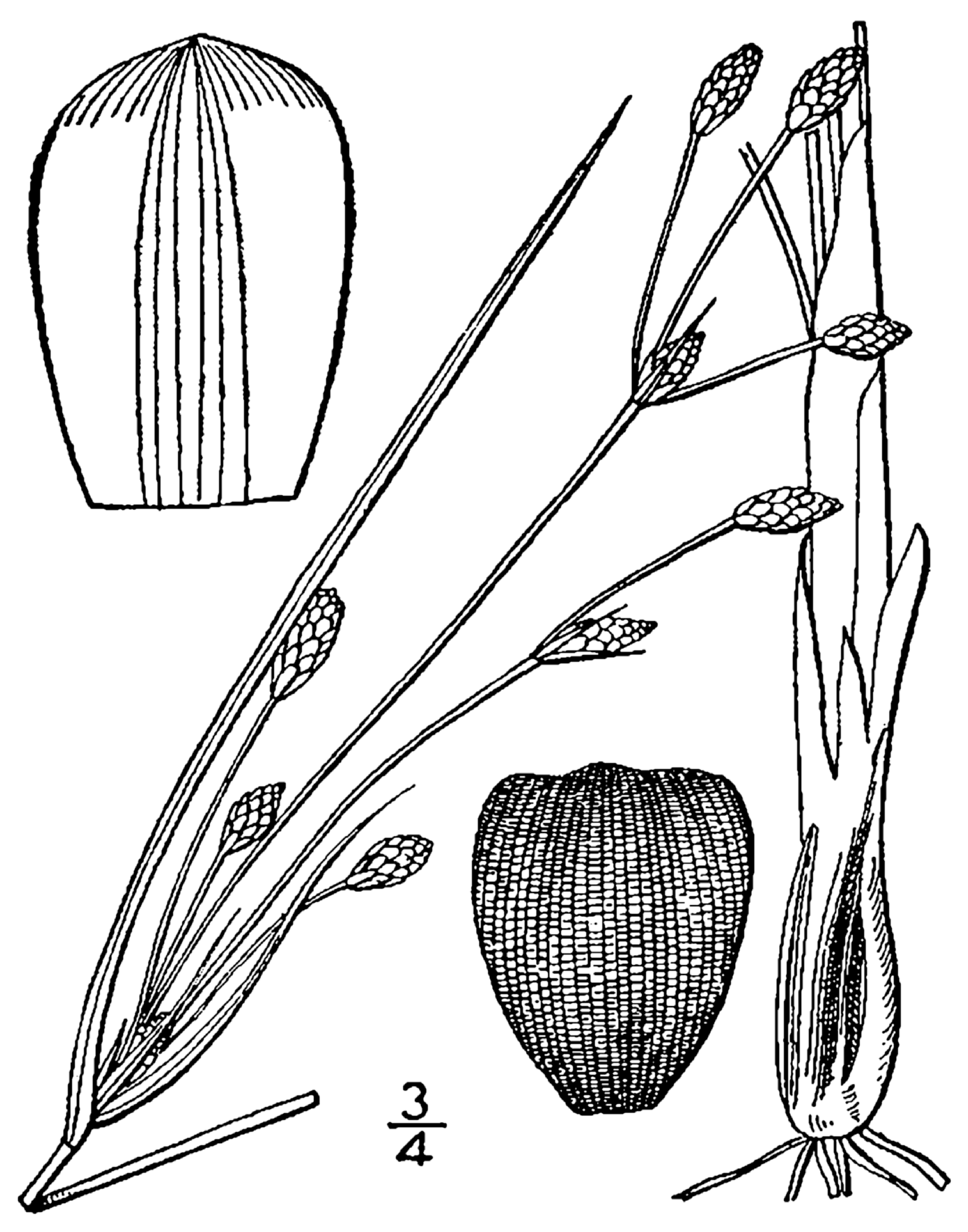

Scientific classification
- Kingdom: Plantae
- Clade: Tracheophytes
- Clade: Angiosperms
- Clade: Monocots
- Clade: Commelinids
- Order: Poales
- Family: Cyperaceae
- Genus: Fimbristylis
- Species: F. spadicea

Binomial name
- Fimbristylis spadicea (L.) Vahl

Synonyms
- Synonymy: Eleogiton spadicea (L.) A.Dietr.; Iria spadicea (L.) Kuntze; Iria spadicea var. normalis Kuntze; Schoenus spadiceus (L.) Vahl; Scirpus spadiceus L. (1753) (basionym); Fimbristylis castanea (Michx.) Vahl; Fimbristylis cylindrica Vahl; Fimbristylis pallidula Kral; Fimbristylis riehleana Steud.; Fimbristylis spadicea var. castanea (Michx.) A.Gray; Fimbristylis spadicea var. depauperata T.Koyama; Fimbristylis spadicea f. domingensis (Pers.) Kük.; Fimbristylis spadicea var. longestigmata Zavaro; Fimbristylis speciosa Rohde ex Spreng.; Fimbristylis sterilis Nees; Fimbristylis umbellata Schrad. ex Nees; Iria castanea (Michx.) Farw.; Iria spadicea var. nigra Kuntze; Iria spadicea var. pallida Kuntze; Iria umbellata (Schrad. ex Nees) Kuntze; Scirpus castaneus Michx.; Scirpus cylindraceus Willd. ex Kunth; Scirpus cylindricus (Vahl) Poir.; Scirpus dichotomus G.Mey.; Scirpus domingensis Pers.; Scirpus sterilis Salzm. ex Steud.

= Fimbristylis spadicea =

Marsh fimbry

Species of grass-like plant

Fimbristylis spadicea, commonly known as marsh fimbry or saltmarsh fimbristylis, is a perennial sedge of the family Cyperaceae. It is native to the coastal Americas from New York and northwestern Mexico to northeastern Argentina and Peru.

The species was first described as Scirpus spadiceus by Carl Linnaeus in 1753. In 1805 Martin Vahl placed it in the newly-described genus Fimbristylis as Fimbristylis spadicea. The species has over two dozen synonyms.

== Description ==
Fimbristylis spadicea commonly grows up to 1 m (3 ft 3 in) in height, forming thick clumps. Its narrow leaves grow from the base of the plant. They are dark brown and sturdy at the base and grow from one half to two thirds of the plant's height in length. The small flowers of the sedge are hidden behind dark, glossy, brown scales that form budlike spikelets.

== Distribution and habitat ==
It is native to the Atlantic and Pacific coasts of the Americas. On the Atlantic coast it ranges from New York to northern Brazil, including the Gulf of Mexico and Caribbean coasts, and to Argentina's Rio de la Plata estuary. On the Pacific coast it ranges from northwestern Mexico to Peru.

It commonly grows in salt marshes coastal dunes, and brackish marsh inland, especially near wharves.
