= Fimbristylis polytrichoides =

Scientific classification
- Kingdom: Plantae
- Clade: Tracheophytes
- Clade: Angiosperms
- Clade: Monocots
- Clade: Commelinids
- Order: Poales
- Family: Cyperaceae
- Genus: Fimbristylis
- Species: F. polytrichoides

Binomial name
- Fimbristylis polytrichoides (Retz.) R.Br.

Species of grass-like plant

Fimbristylis polytrichoides is a species of fimbry known by the common name rusty sedge, native to east Africa, Madagascar, China, Southeast Asia, New Guinea and Australia. The plant is common along the coast line and estuaries of Australia. The flowers are a distinctive rusty brown color appearing on a single spikelet from May to July.
