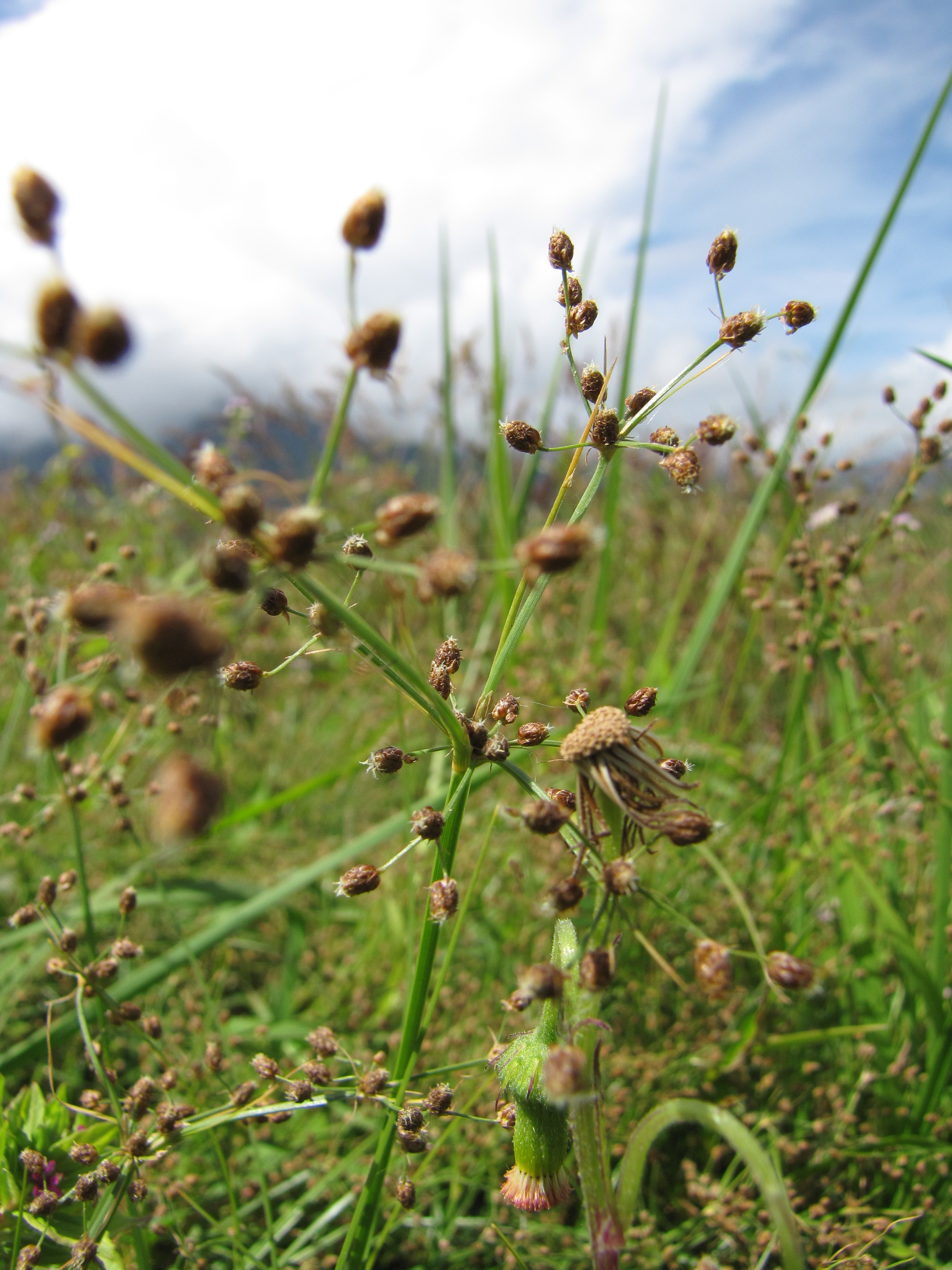

Scientific classification
- Kingdom: Plantae
- Clade: Tracheophytes
- Clade: Angiosperms
- Clade: Monocots
- Clade: Commelinids
- Order: Poales
- Family: Cyperaceae
- Genus: Fimbristylis
- Species: F. littoralis

Binomial name
- Fimbristylis littoralis Gaudich.

= Fimbristylis littoralis =

Lesser Fimbry

Species of grass-like plant

Fimbristylis littoralis, commonly known as lesser fimbry or lesser fimbristylis, is a sedge of the family Cyperaceae that is native to many countries in Africa, Asia and Oceania including across much of northern Australia.

== Description ==
The annual grass-like or herb sedge typically grows to a height of 0.05 to 0.7 metres (0.16 to 2.30 ft) and has a tufted habit. In Australia, it blooms between February and August and produces green-brown flowers. It has slender culms slender with a length of 40 to 60 cm (16 to 24 in) that are four or five-angled and quite flattened. The leaves are up to a length of 40 cm (16 in) and are 1.5 to 2.5 mm (0.059 to 0.098 in) wide with stiff and threadlike basal leaves that are about half the length of the culm. The inflorescence has a diffuse compound umbel with a length of 6 to 10 cm (2.4 to 3.9 in) with spherical to ovate shaped reddish-brown spikelets with a length of 2.5 to 4 mm (0.098 to 0.157 in) and a width of 1.5 to 2 mm (0.059 to 0.079 in) that are round or acute toward the apex. It has ovate 1 mm (0.039 in) long spirally arranged glumes and yellow anthers.

== Taxonomy ==
The species was first formally described by the botanist Charles Gaudichaud-Beaupré in 1829 as part of the work Voyage Autour du Monde ... sur les Corvettes de S.M. l'Uranie et la Physicienne as published in Botanique.

== Distribution ==
In Australia, it is found in Western Australia it is found in swamps, along creeks and rivers and other damp areas in the Kimberley region where it grows in sandy-clay alluvium often around basalt. It is also found across the top end of the Northern Territory and tropical parts of Queensland.

The species has been introduced and is regarded as a weed throughout North and South America. It is thought to have been introduced into the West Indies as a contaminant late in the nineteenth century and was collected in 1886 in Puerto Rico.

It is known to be problematic in rice plantations throughout tropical and subtropical regions of the world. It is also found in banana and maize plantations in Taiwan, abaca plantations in the Philippines, taro plantations in Hawaii and sugarcane and maize crops in Indonesia.
