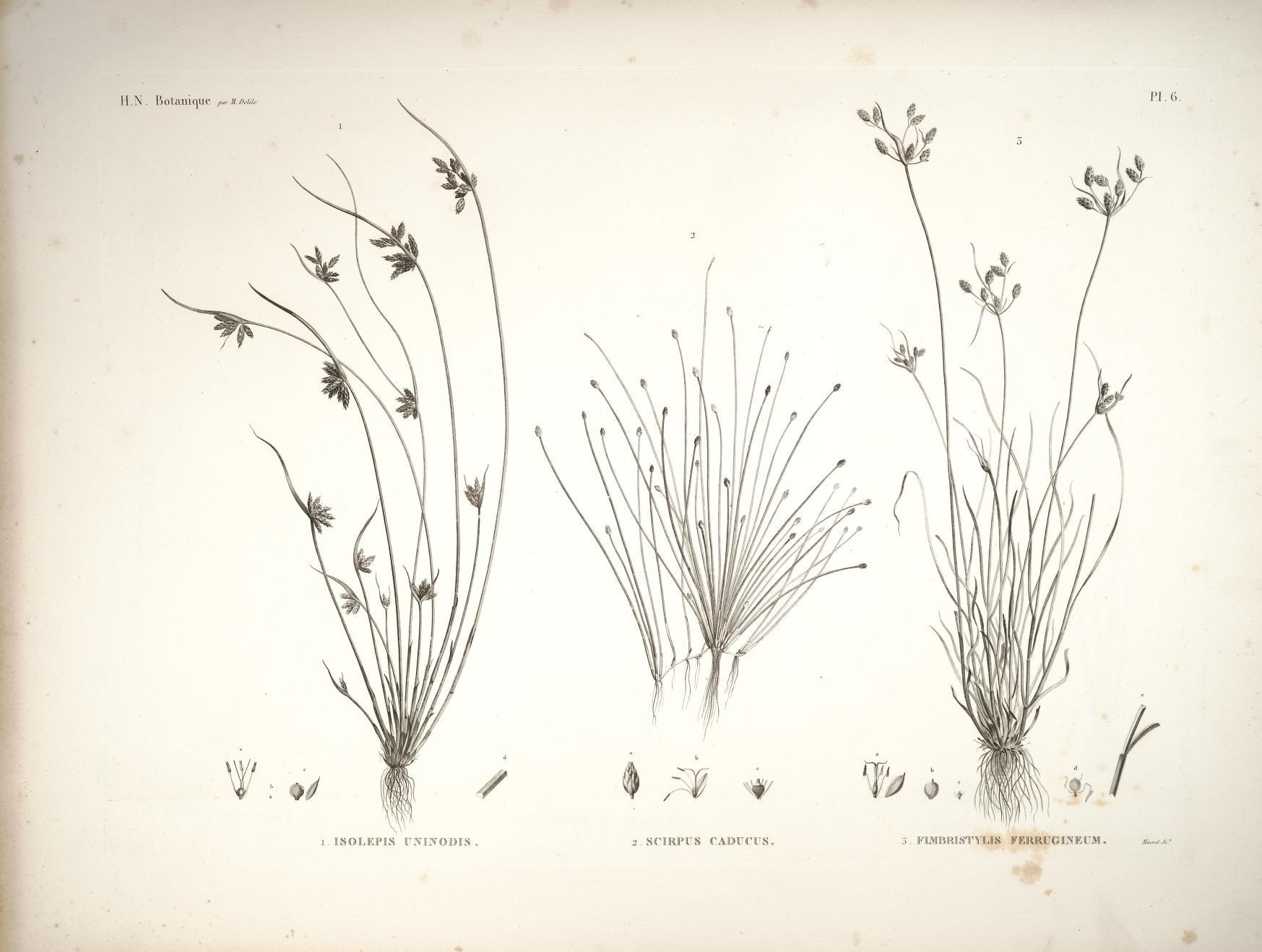
- Fimbristylis ferruginea (right plant)

Scientific classification
- Kingdom: Plantae
- Clade: Tracheophytes
- Clade: Angiosperms
- Clade: Monocots
- Clade: Commelinids
- Order: Poales
- Family: Cyperaceae
- Genus: Fimbristylis
- Species: F. ferruginea

Binomial name
- Fimbristylis ferruginea (L.) Vahl

Synonyms
- Scirpus ferrugineus L.

= Fimbristylis ferruginea =

Species of grass-like plant

Fimbristylis ferruginea is a species of fimbry, commonly referred to as rusty sedge or West Indian fimbry. This plant is frequently found along the coastlines and estuaries of Australia. It is also native to certain regions in Africa, southern Asia, and South America. The flowers of this species exhibit a distinctive rusty brown color and appear on a single spikelet during the months of May to July.
