= Abildgaardia macrantha =

Scientific classification
- Kingdom: Plantae
- Clade: Tracheophytes
- Clade: Angiosperms
- Clade: Monocots
- Clade: Commelinids
- Order: Poales
- Family: Cyperaceae
- Genus: Abildgaardia
- Species: A. macrantha

Binomial name
- Abildgaardia macrantha (Boeckeler) Goetgh.

Synonyms
- Fimbristylis macrantha Boeckeler; Iria macrantha (Boeckeler) Kuntze

Species of grass-like plant

Abildgaardia macrantha, synonym Fimbristylis macrantha, is a sedge of the family Cyperaceae. It is native to northern Australia (the Northern Territory, Queensland, and Western Australia).

The perennial grass-like or herb sedge typically grows to a height of 0.4 to 0.7 metres (1.31 to 2.30 ft) and has a tufted habit. It blooms between January and March and produces brown flowers.

In Western Australia it is found on rocky hills and scree slopes in the Kimberley region where it grows in gravelly lateritic soils.
