= Peter Kenneth Latz =

Australian agrostologist, botanist, and author

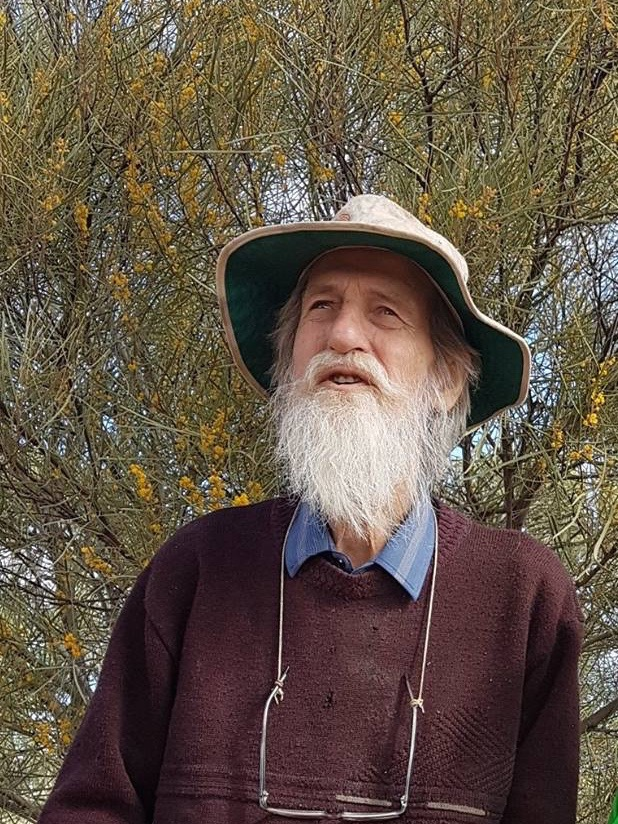
- Born: January 1, 1941 (age 85); Alice Springs, Australia
- Awards: Australian Natural History Medallion (2021)
- Scientific career
- Fields: Botany, ethnobotany, ecology
- Author abbrev. (botany): Latz

Peter Kenneth Latz (January 1, 1941) is an agrostologist, botanist, ethnobotanist, and author from Central Australia. For 55 years he worked with the Eastern and Western Arrernte, Alyawarre, Anmatyerre, Pintupi/Luritja, Pitjantjatjara/Yankunytjatjara, and Warlpiri people to organise and share their cultural and scientific knowledge of central Australian plants. In many areas of Australia this knowledge has been lost, but it has been preserved in the Red Centre as a result of this lifelong collaboration. He has published articles and books on Australian plants, particularly on arid grasses and vegetation and Aboriginal plant use.

== Early life ==
Latz was born in Alice Springs and grew up in the Arrernte settlement of Ntaria / Hermannsburg Mission 120 km west of Alice Springs in Central Australia, the son of Lutheran missionaries. This town is most well-known as the home of the renowned painter Albert Namatjira with whom Peter’s mother worked. Peter was raised by an Aboriginal housemaid, and every weekend explored the bush with the Arrernte children his age. From them, Peter learned how to live off the land. This early sharing of knowledge shaped his career as Australia’s foremost non-Aboriginal authority on desert plants and their medicinal and culinary uses. In his early adult life Latz worked as a stockman, road train driver, buffalo wrangler, snake handler and stock inspector. He worked as a ringer at Mount Riddock Station from 1959.

== Botany ==
Latz obtained a bachelor's degree in Zoology and Botany from the University of Adelaide. In 1978 he held a visiting fellowship at Australian National University (ANU) to study Aboriginal prehistorical use of the land. This was followed by a Master's degree at the University of New England on the Aboriginal use of plants ("bush tucker" and "bush medicine"). By the time Peter submitted his M.Sc. thesis in 1982 Bushfires and Bushtucker: Aborigines and Plants of Central Australia he was leading the emerging national interest in Aboriginal uses of native species.

== Northern Territory Herbarium ==
In 1970, Peter was hired as a botanist for the Northern Territory Herbarium, a position he held for 40 years. He was responsible for botanical collection and research across the whole of the Northern Territory, and, at the time, much of the flora of arid Central Australia was still unknown to scientists. Latz spent much of his career on expeditions to find and describe many rare plants, collecting and describing specimens for the collection of the Northern Territory Herbarium, and working with Aboriginal botanists to identify their names in nine languages. Over his four decades, Latz grew the collection of the Alice Springs Herbarium with colleague David Albrecht, to more than 50,000 specimens.

Peter conducted the first botanical survey of the Wessel Islands (Northern Territory) where he described several new plant species for the NT, and surveyed Kings Canyon to determine if it should be granted national park status. At Kings Canyon, he identified plants found nowhere else in the world, with plants that also occur in Tasmania coexisting with plants from the Top End. He concluded that it was one of the most botanically rich places in central Australia and in 1989 it was established as Watarrka National Park.

=== Bushfires and Bushtucker (1995) ===
While continuing to work at the NT Herbarium, Latz published the landmark text, Bushfires and Bushtucker. This brought together western scientific and Aboriginal knowledge of central Australian bush foods and medicines in a single comprehensive textbook for the very first time. It went through several reprints and was published in a revised 2nd edition in 2018. Before Bushfires and Bushtucker, many central Australian plants had been poorly or incorrectly identified, and there was little information on the finer points of plant use. To identify gaps in his knowledge, Peter attempted to live off the land. When he encountered difficulties, he consulted with dozens of Aboriginal experts to obtain information that had never been recorded before. When writing the book, he also found that many of the foods are no longer used on a regular basis if at all, because their preparation is difficult and people learned to prefer modern foods. Therefore, this book has unique scientific, cultural and historical value and the ethnobotanical information is as useful and relevant now as it was in 1995.

Bushfires and Bushtucker is cited in a wide range of closely related scholarship including detailed studies of Aboriginal methods for using native species; identifying active compounds with medicinal properties in Eremophila (emu or native fuchsia bushes); and land management focused on local plants. It also stimulated research in more distant topics, such as describing new species of Acacia (wattles) in central and in northern savanna Australia. Bushfires and Bushtucker also encouraged research activities in arid zone fire and its effects on flora, and in the use and management of fire by local peoples. For example, detailed experiments were conducted to examine the effects of fire on floristics and dynamic boundaries of plant communities as a result of Peter Latz’ observations and comments.

When Bushfires and Bushtucker was first published, it used plant names from Flora of Central Australia (1981). Recent research has uncovered new species, new names, and new understandings of the limits of genera and families. The updated 2018 edition of Bushfires and Bushtucker reflects these discoveries, with over a hundred name changes that reflect the most contemporary species lists and literature available, while retaining the previous edition’s accepted species names, common names, and Aboriginal names. In addition to this text, Peter published a smaller and abridged version, Pocket Bushtucker that became a best-seller. He also produced a photographic exhibition, Desert Abstracts that toured six Northern Territory towns, and he conducted local plant tours with each exhibit.

Peter never accepted royalties for Bushfires and Bushtucker because it was based on Aboriginal knowledge that had been shared with him. All profits from its sale, go to the Institute for Aboriginal Development who published it.

=== The Flaming Desert (2007) ===
Latz's second major book presents his assessment of the prehistory and current ecology of central Australia, focussing on Aboriginal use of fire to modify plant communities. It includes a chapter on the role of spinifex (Triodia spp.), the most common plant on the continent; a chapter on fire-sensitive plants in different communities; and chapters on the effects of fire on plants and animals in desert and tropical landscapes, and on the Aboriginal use of fire.

=== Blind Moses: Aranda man of high degree and Christian evangelist (2014) ===
This third book saw a move away from botanical topics to a work of pure biography. Moses Tjalkabota Uraiakuraia, a Western Aranda man, embraced the Christian faith after Lutheran missionaries entered his country in 1877. As a child growing up in Ntaria, Latz was impressed by this 'man of high degree'. In this account of the extraordinary man's life, Latz draws on his lifetime of experience among the Aranda and gives the reader an insight into this life.

=== Tough, Tantalizing or Tasty: Stories about Australian desert plants (2021) ===
This book is a selective field guide including anecdotes of Latz's experience traveling and collecting plants across the deserts of Central Australia. Included alongside Latz's personal notes are ethnobotanical roles of the included plants in Aboriginal Australian culture, and the work of botanists past and present.

There are still more amazing plants to discover in the desert but so few botanists working here. There is much work to be done - endangered plants to protect, distributions to map, and important problems to solve, such as fire management, sustainable use and development of bush foods, to name a few. I urge you to explore Central Australia and its plants, make your own discoveries, develop your own ideas, generate your own stories and, most importantly, look after our Australian desert. — Peter Latz, Tough, Tantalizing or Tasty, postscript

== Volunteer Work ==
Latz regularly participates as a field researcher in the annual excavation program at the Alcoota Scientific Reserve. Here, Latz has been deeply involved in the excavation of fossil remains of one of the largest birds that ever lived, Dromornis stirtoni, the wolf-sized Thylacine, Thylacinus potens, the Alcoota Marsupial Lion, Wakaleo alcootaensis, the wombat-like Miocene diprotodontoids Kolopsis torus and Plaisiodon centralis, and the leaping herbivorous ground-sloth-like Palorchestes painei, and many other browsers that helped to shape desert plant communities. In his public presentations, Latz often points out that desert plants are adapted to browsers such as camels, but not to grazers such as cattle.

Latz also volunteers his time for every environmental organisation in the Alice Springs region: as a speaker on the risk of weeds, and a leader of bush walks for the Alice Springs Field Naturalists Club; as a trainer for Alice Springs Landcare, particularly on weed removal in the Todd River; as an adviser to Olive Pink Botanic Garden on native plant behavior and care; as an advisor to Arid Lands Environment Centre on land management practices; and as a teacher of the next generation of Aboriginal botanists who follow him on his bushwalks with cameras and tape recorders. He is particularly concerned about the ongoing impact of introduced buffel grass, and the growing risks of other weeds. He identifies weeds that are spreading and less palatable to cattle, and thus may gradually come to dominate native plants on pastoral stations, and then lectures on the risks and steps to mitigate them. Latz maintain a residential block on which he has demonstrated how to restore buffel-infested land to a native state. He also adopted a riparian ecosystem, fenced it from cattle, and over many years removed weeds to restore its native plant diversity. It has since become a destination for Field Naturalist Club excursions to see the diversity of local native plant communities.

== Awards and honours ==
Latz won a Northern Territory Landcare Award in 2015 in the Australian Government Individual Landcarer category.

=== Australian Natural History Medallion ===
In 2021 Latz was awarded the Australian Natural History Medallion by the Field Naturalists Club of Victoria. Latz was jointly nominated for the award alongside "the Aboriginal botanists of Central Australia" by the members of the Alice Springs Field Naturalists Club. This medallion is awarded each year to the person judged to have made the most meritorious contribution to the understanding of Australian Natural History. The nomination for the medallion reads, in part:

The Eastern and Western Arrernte, Alyawarr, Anmatjere, Pintupi/Luritja, Pitjantjatjara/Yankunytjatjara, and Warlpiri Aboriginal people of central Australia have spent thousands of years developing their detailed knowledge of central Australian plants and their uses. Due to their generous sharing of knowledge with Peter Latz, and his comprehensive organisation and publication, we have a unique body of scientific, cultural, linguistic and historical knowledge that demonstrates the extraordinary qualities of our native flora. Because central Australia is the world’s largest area of intact native habitat, their efforts have global significance.

== Legacy ==
In addition to describing many plants new to science, Latz has numerous species named after him.

=== Plants named after Latz ===
- Acacia latzii - Latz's Wattle or Tjilpi Wattle
- Sauropus latzii - a tropical herb.
- Aristida latzii - Rock Three-awn
- Sporobolus latzii - Wakaya Desert dropseed
- Panicum latzii - Latz's panicum
- Triodia latzii - Latz's spinifex
- Pottia latzii - a bryophyte
- Ustilago latzii - Latz's smut fungi
- Stackhousia latzii - a herb
- Marsilea latzii - Latz's water clover
- Ipomoea polpha subsp. latzii - Latz's desert potato

=== Animals named after Latz ===
- Branchinella latzi - Uluru fairy shrimp

== Bibliography ==
The standard author abbreviation Latz is used to indicate this person as the author when citing a botanical name.

- 1995 - Bushfires & Bush Tucker
- 1999 - Pocket Bush Tucker
- 2007 - The Flaming Desert: Arid Australia - A Fire Shaped Landscape
- 2014 - Blind Moses: Aranda man of high degree and Christian evangelist
- 2021 - Tough, Tantalizing or Tasty: Stories about Australian desert plants
