= Johannes Hendrikus Kern =

Dutch botanist (1903–1974)

- Born: December 21, 1903; Nijmegen, Netherlands
- Died: July 29, 1974 (aged 70)
- Scientific career
- Fields: botany
- Author abbrev. (botany): J.Kern

Johannes Hendrikus Kern (1903–1974) was a Dutch botanist, with an international reputation as an expert on the Cyperaceae (the sedge family).

Kern graduated from a secondary school in Nijmegen in 1922 with a diploma qualifying him as a teacher. He received further diplomas: in 1927 for head-teacher, in 1928 for French, and in 1933 for German. He was an elementary school teacher from 1922 to 1927 at Mill, and from 1927 to 1940 at Vlaardingen. He was a head-teacher from 1940 to 1942 at Dedemsvaart, from 1942 to 1946 at Gorinchem, and from 1946 to 1949 at Nijmegen. From his youth he studied botany and, in particular, the flora of the Netherlands. In 1924 he published a paper on Netherlands plants belonging to the genus Carex. Impressed by Kern's presentations at meetings of the Royal Botanical Society of the Netherlands, van Stennis in 1949 offered Kern employment at the Bogor Botanical Gardens. Kern eagerly accepted and first worked on a revision of the Viburnum Malesia part of the multi-volume Flora Malesiana and then worked on a revision of the sedge family part of Flora Malesiana. He returned from Bogor to the Netherlands in November 1952 to join the staff of the Flora Malesiana Foundation, located in Leiden's Rijksherbarium. In June 1957 he became a staff member of the Rijksherbarium, where he worked on the Cyperaceae of Malesia and nearby regions. In August 1961 he gave a lecture New Look at Cyperaceae at the Norwich Meeting of the British Association for the Advancement of Science. In January 1969 Kern officially retired from the Rijksherbarium and was appointed an honorary collaborator there. In 1970 the University of Nijmegen appointed him doctor honoris causa.

== Selected publications ==
- "The genus Viburnum in Malaysia". Reinwardtia. 1: 107–170. 1951.
- "Viburnum". Flora Malesiana. series I. 4: 175–194. 1951.
- "A neglected Indian species of Cyperus". Reinwardtia. 1: 463–466. 1952.
- "Some new Cyperaceae". Blumea. 12: 23–30. 1963.
- "A new Hawaiian Gahnia (Cyperaceae)". Blumea. 12: 349–351. 1964.
