= P. sinensis =

P. sinensis may refer to:

- Pelodiscus sinensis, the Chinese soft shelled turtle, a reptile species
- Pseudotsuga sinensis, the Chinese Douglas-fir, a conifer species found in China and Taiwan
- Primula sinensis, the Chinese primrose, a plant species found in China
- Psittacosaurus sinensis, a dinosaur species

== Synonyms ==
- Pergularia sinensis or Periploca sinensis, synonyms for Cryptolepis sinensis, a plant species

== See also ==
- Flora Sinensis
