= C. sinensis =

C. sinensis may refer to:

- Camellia sinensis, a plant species whose leaves and leaf buds are used to produce tea
- Celtis sinensis, the Chinese hackberry, a flowering plant species native to slopes in East Asia
- Centropus sinensis, the greater coucal or the crow pheasant, a bird species widespread in Asia, from India, east to south China and Indonesia
- Cephalotaxus sinensis a coniferous shrub or small tree species native to central and southern China
- Citrus sinensis, the sweet orange
- Clonorchis sinensis, a human liver fluke species
- Cryptolepis sinensis, a plant species
- Cordyceps sinensis, a species of fungus

== Synonyms ==
- Calyptraea sinensis, a synonym for Calyptraea chinensis, a sea snail species

== See also ==
- Flora Sinensis
