= V. sinensis =

V. sinensis may refer to:

- Vallaris sinensis, a synonym for Cryptolepis sinensis, a plant species
- Vespertilio sinensis, the Asian Parti-colored bat, a bat species found from Taiwan through eastern China and Siberia to the Korean Peninsula and Japan

== See also ==
- Flora Sinensis
