= E. sinensis =

E. sinensis may refer to:

- Eosimias sinensis, the dawn monkey of China, an extinct primate species first discovered in China

== Synonyms ==
- Emericia sinensis, a synonym for Cryptolepis sinensis, a plant species

== See also ==
- Flora Sinensis
