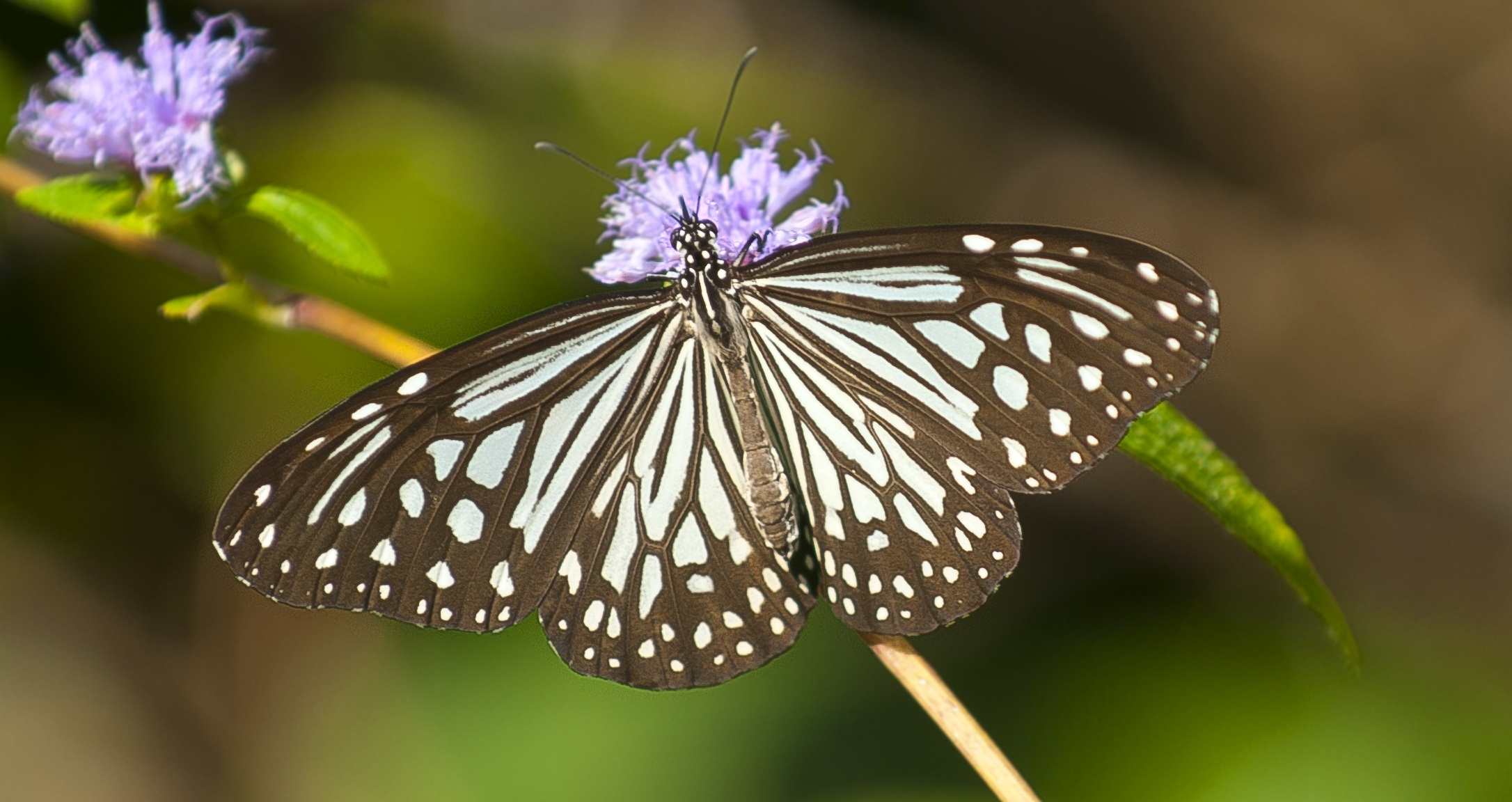
- Mhadei Wildlife Sanctuary, India
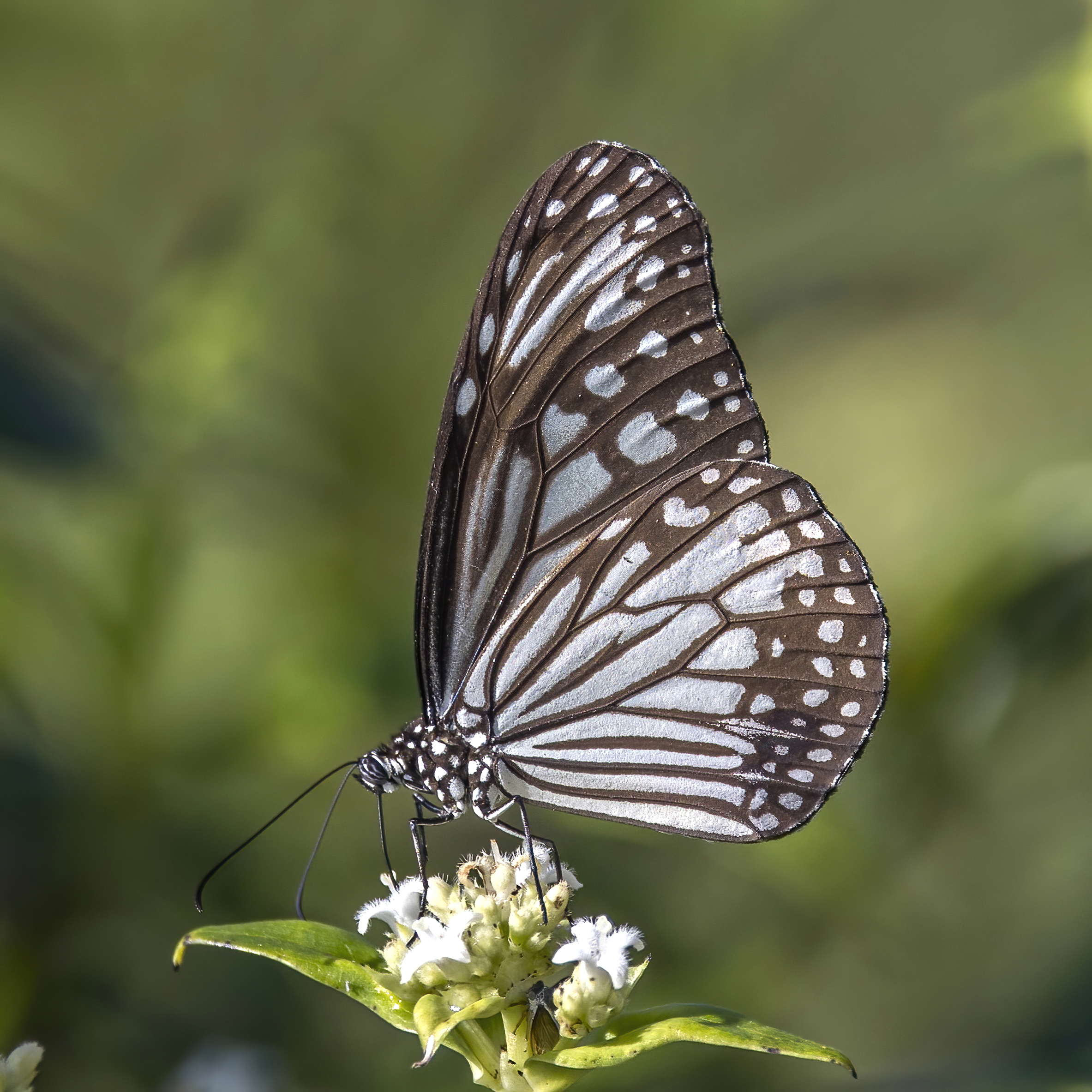
- In Sri Lanka both P. a. agaea

Scientific classification
- Kingdom: Animalia
- Phylum: Arthropoda
- Class: Insecta
- Order: Lepidoptera
- Family: Nymphalidae
- Genus: Parantica
- Species: P. aglea

Binomial name
- Parantica aglea (Stoll, 1782)

Synonyms
- Danais aglea

= Parantica aglea =

Species of butterfly

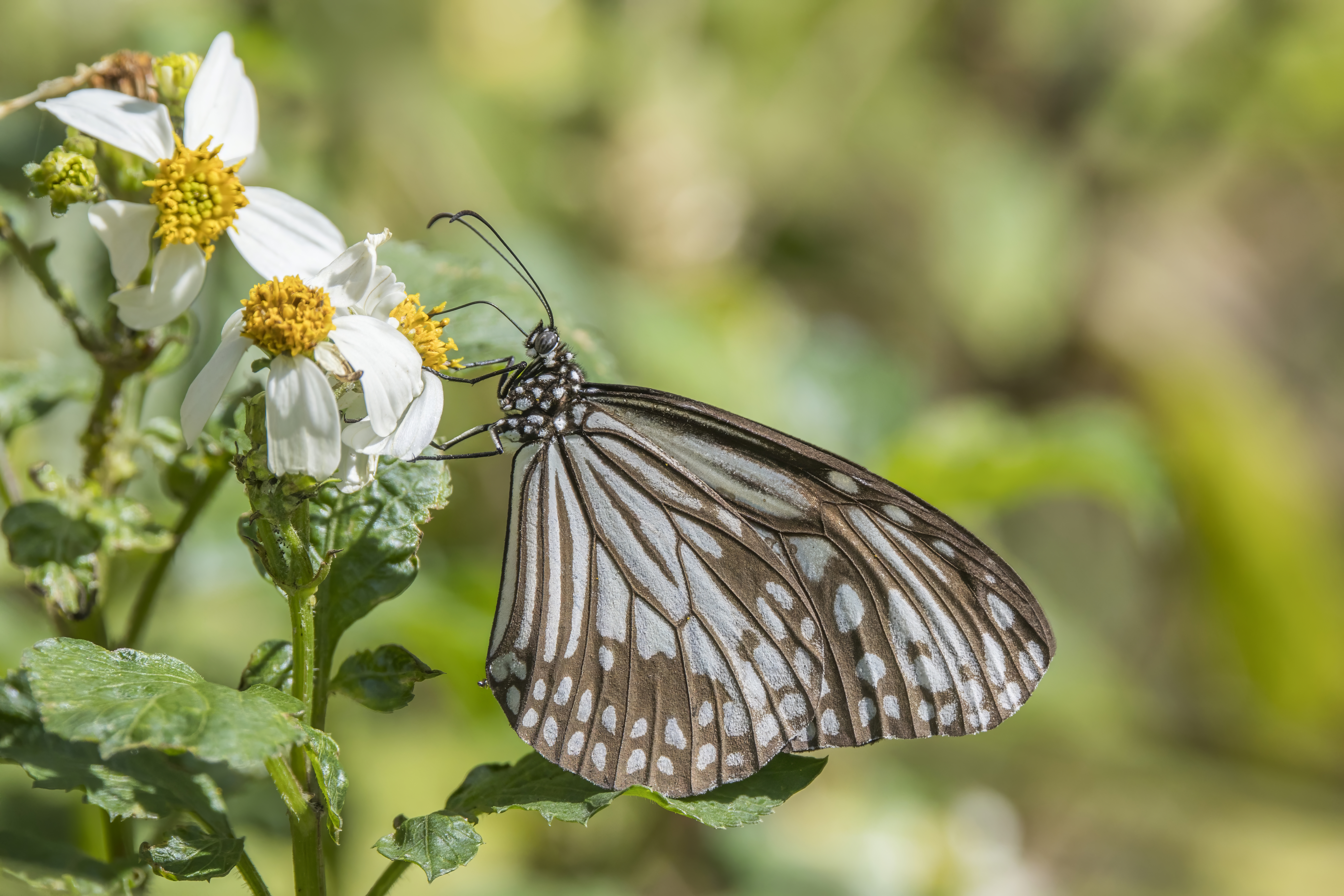
P. a. maghaba, Taiwan

Parantica aglea, commonly known as the glassy tiger, is a butterfly found in the Indomalayan realm. The species is a member of the Danainae subfamily of the Nymphalidae family.

== Description ==
Several subspecies are recognized. In the British Museum's collection, there are specimens of the true Parantica aglea aglea from Myanmar, as well as others, indistinguishable from the typical Parantica aglea melanoides, from Mysore.

=== Subspecies Parantica aglea aglea ===
The ground color of this species is a sooty black, with subhyaline bluish-white streaks and spots. On the forewing, the 11th vein is fused with the 12th.

Additionally, the first interspace of the upperside forewing has two relatively long, broad streaks that unite at the base and are truncated outwardly. The cell contains a very broad, somewhat club-shaped streak, traversed by two fine black lines. Interspaces 2 and 3 display basal spots, an irregular discal series of three spots and two elongated streaks, as well as a subterminal series of spots. These two series curve inward opposite the apex of the wing, with the latter continuing along the apical half of the costa. Finally, a terminal row of smaller paired spots appears within the interspaces.

On the hindwing, interspaces 1a and 1b exhibit broad, long streaks extending from the base. Interspace 1 and the cell each contain two streaks that unite at the base, with the pair in the cell having a short streak positioned obliquely between their apices. This is followed by a series of broad, elongate, inwardly pointed spots in interspaces 2–8, and then by somewhat irregular rows of subterminal and terminal spots. The underside is similar, although the markings and spots are sometimes slightly ill-defined and blurred.

The antennae are black; the head and thorax are black with white spots, and the abdomen is blackish-brown with an ochraceous underside. A male secondary sex mark is present in form 2.

=== Subspecies Parantica aglea melanoides ===
The differences between the northern and eastern forms are as follows: the wings are generally longer and narrower, with hyaline markings, especially in interspace 1 of the forewing and in the cells of both forewing and hindwing, being much broader. In many specimens, the black ground color in these areas is reduced to a thin black line enclosed within the subhyaline marking. On the underside, the streaks are often blurred and diffuse. The wingspan ranges from 70 to 100 mm.

== Distribution ==
The subspecies Parantica aglea aglea is found in Sri Lanka and the Western Ghats, extending north to Pune and the Niligiris.

Parantica aglea melanoides is distributed across the Himalayas from Kashmir to Nepal, as well as in the Sylhet and Chittagong regions of Bangladesh, in Assam, India, in Myanmar, and in Tenasserim.

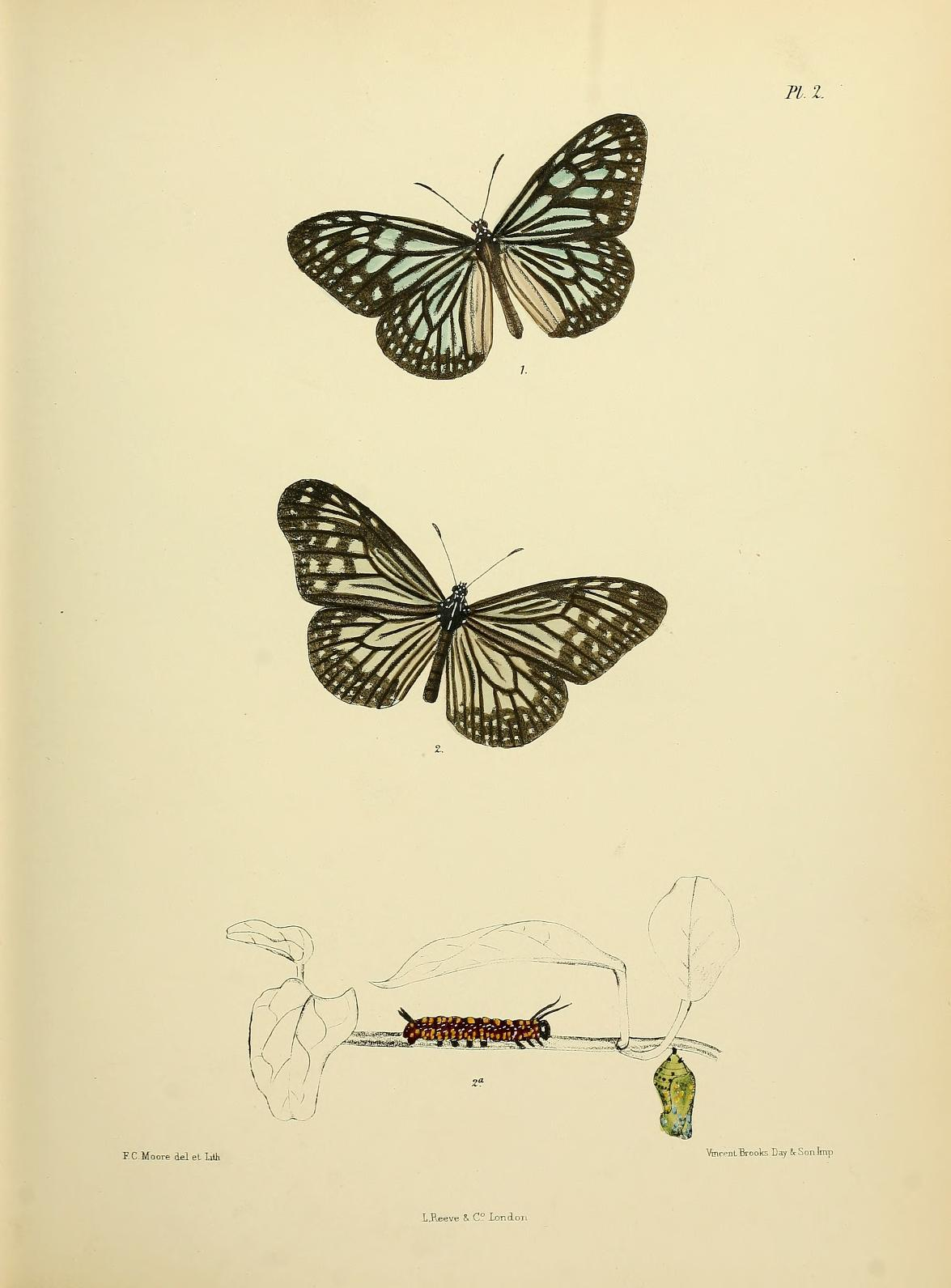
Plate from Frederic Moore's The Lepidoptera of Ceylon depicting imago, larva and pupa

== Life cycle ==
=== Food plants ===
The dogbanes Vincetoxicum bracteatum and Vincetoxicum dalzellii both serve as food plants for the caterpillars.

=== Eggs ===
White, pearl-shaped eggs are laid on the undersides of leaves and hatch after about three days.

=== Larva ===
The caterpillar is dark claret brown, featuring two round chrome-yellow spots on each segment, with smaller bluish-white spots scattered between them, clustering to form a conspicuous line along the sides. The legs and ventral surface are purplish-black, while the tentacula, positioned as usual on the 3rd and 12th segments, are claret brown.

The plants that host Parantica aglea larvae include Calotropis gigantea, Ceropegia bulbosa, Ceropegia lawii, Cryptolepis dubia, Vincetoxicum indicum, and Vincetoxicum flexuosum.

=== Pupa ===
The pupae of Parantica aglea are green and spotted with silver, black, and gold, and they have a very tight shape behind the thorax.

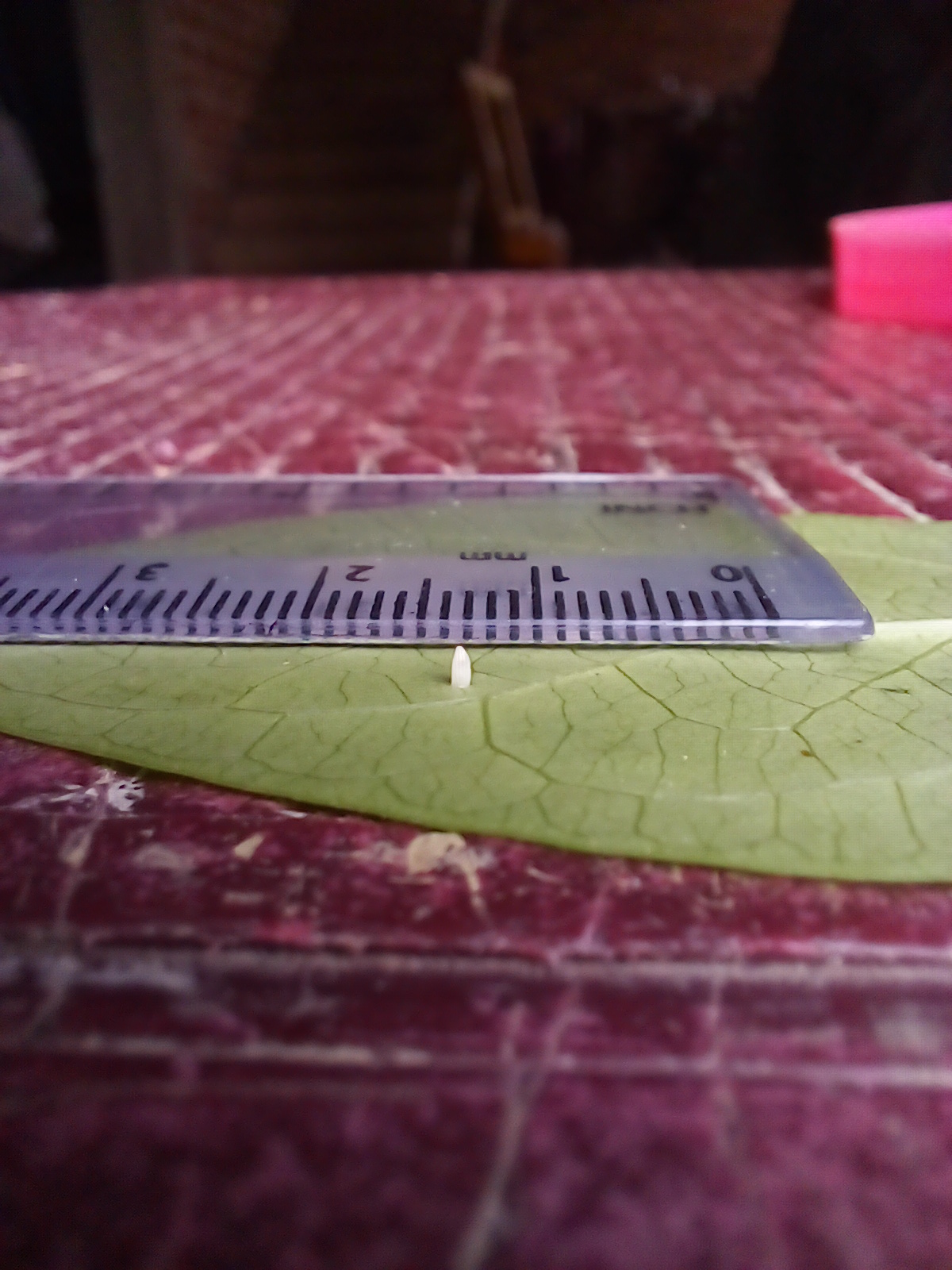
Egg

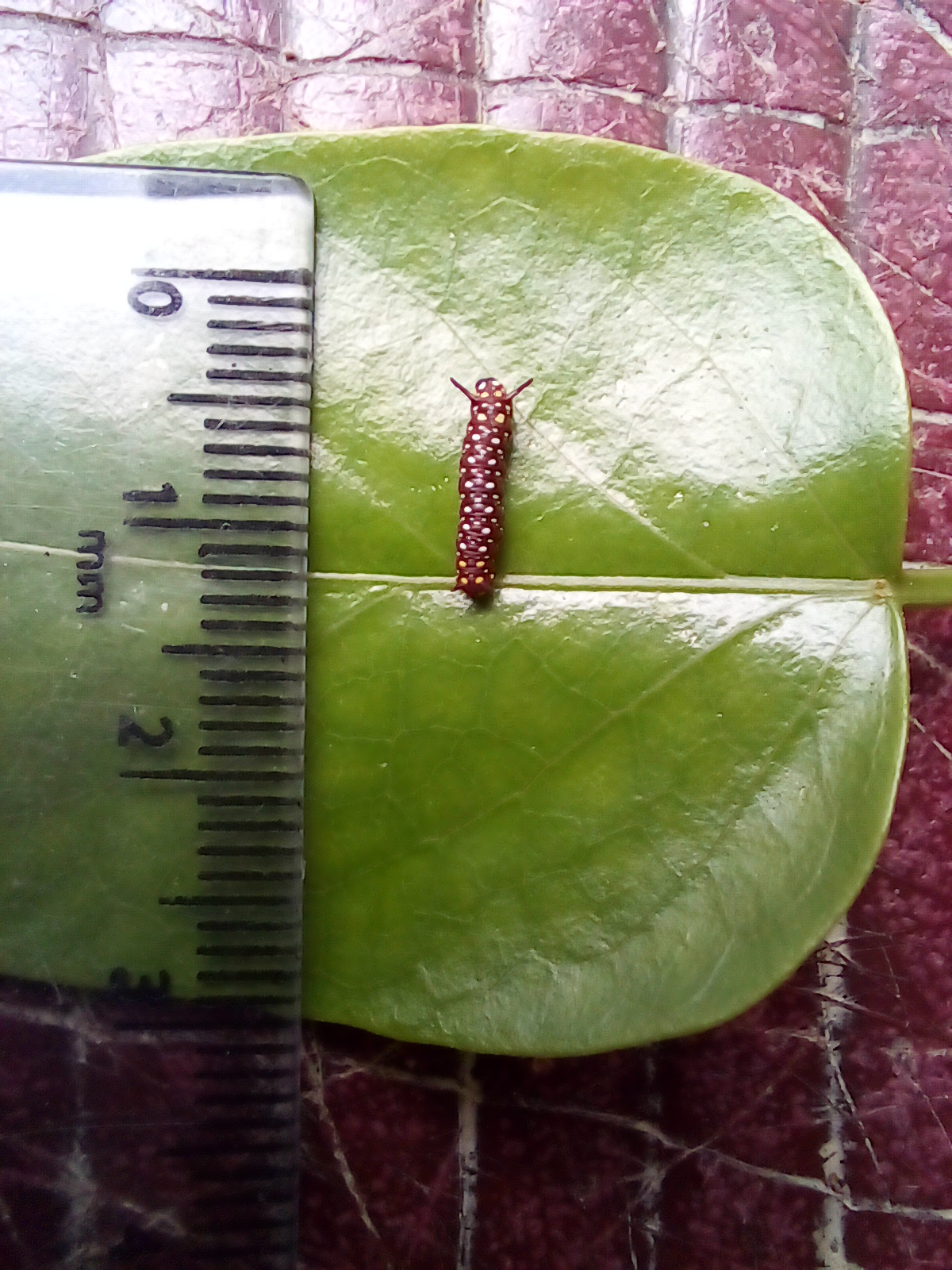
Larva (first instar)

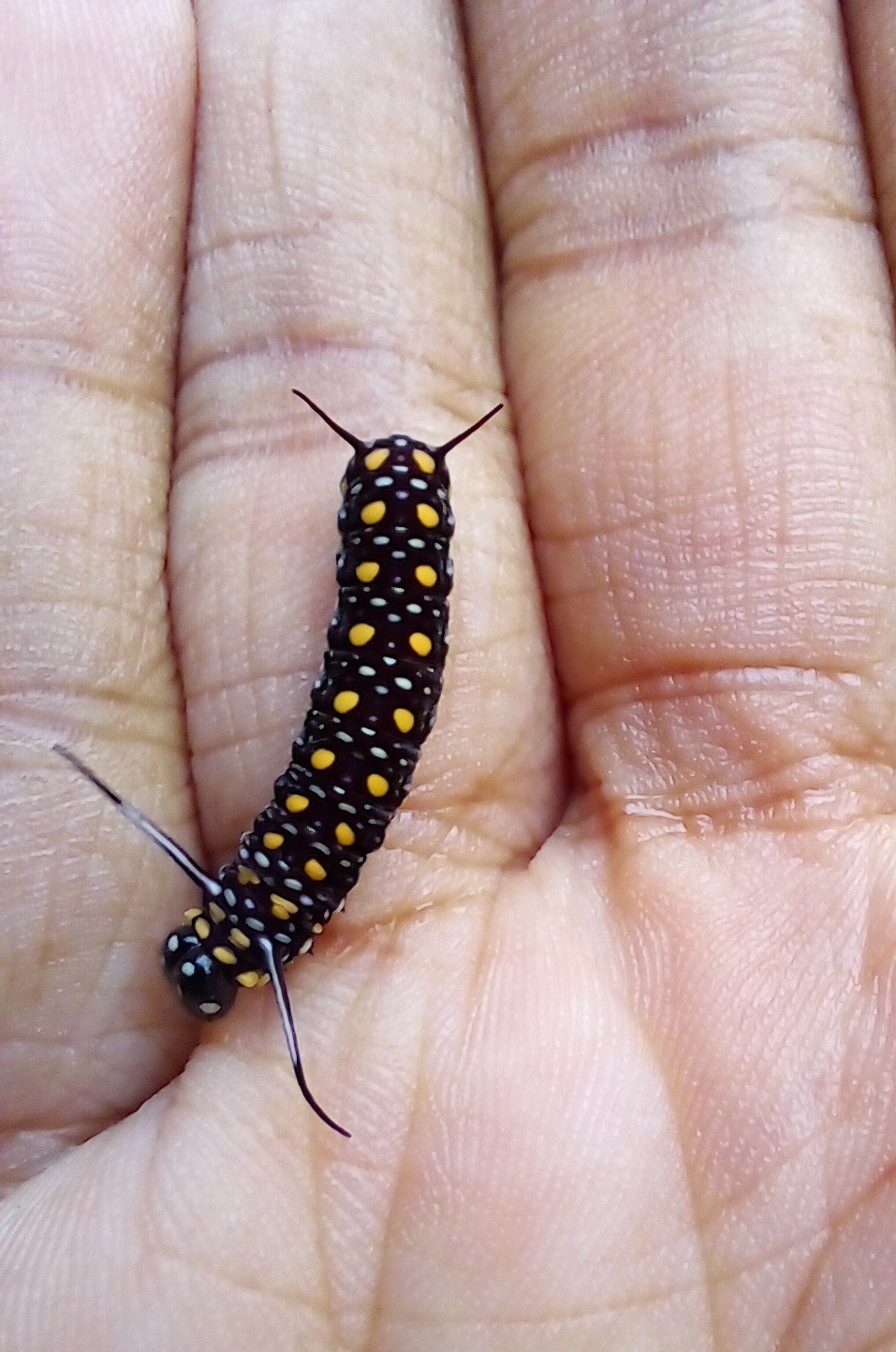
Larva (last instar)

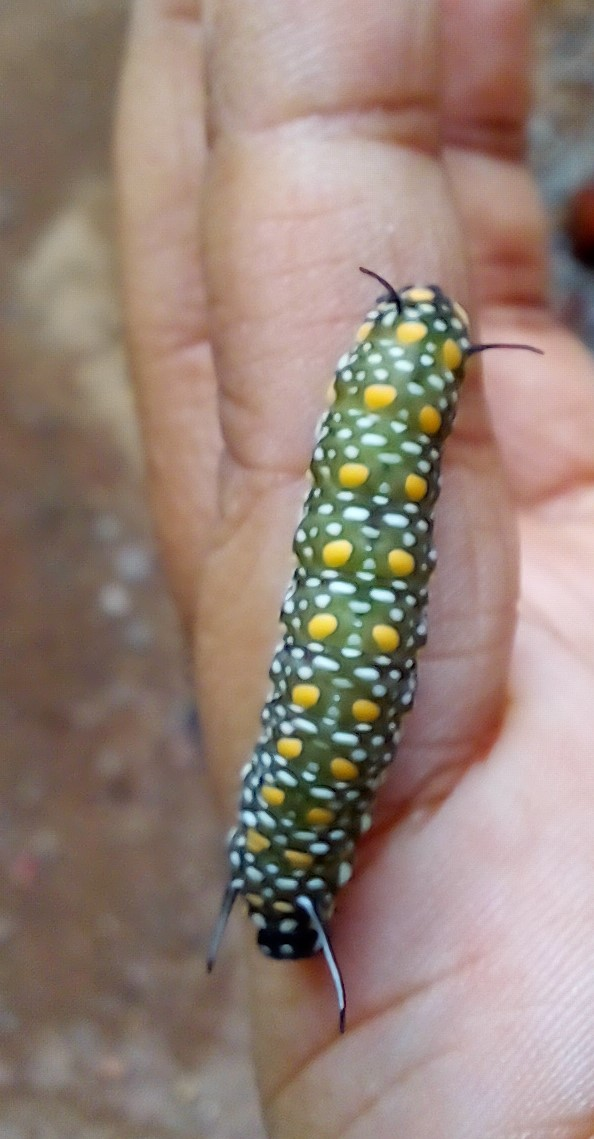
Pre-pupal Larva

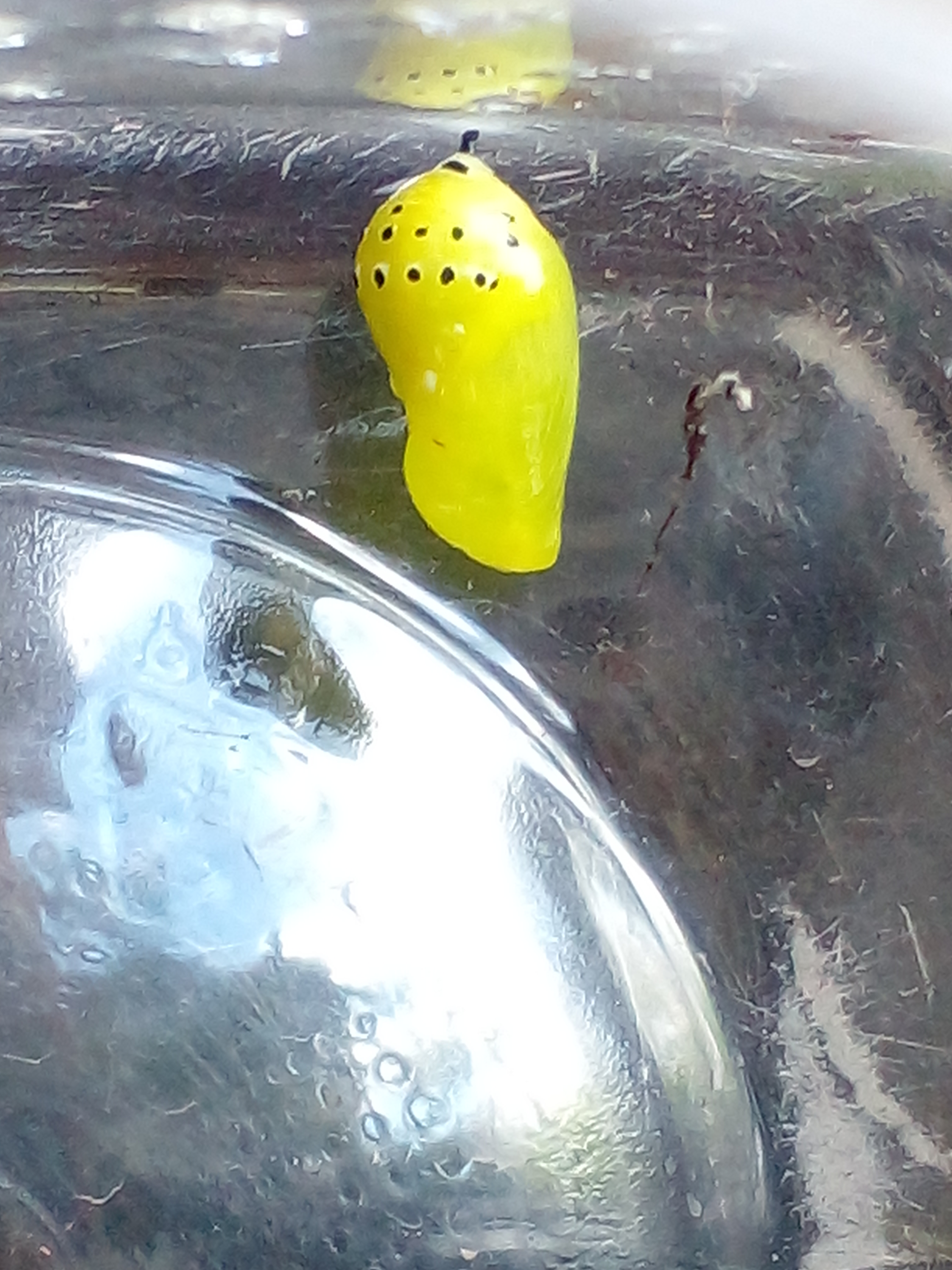
Pupa

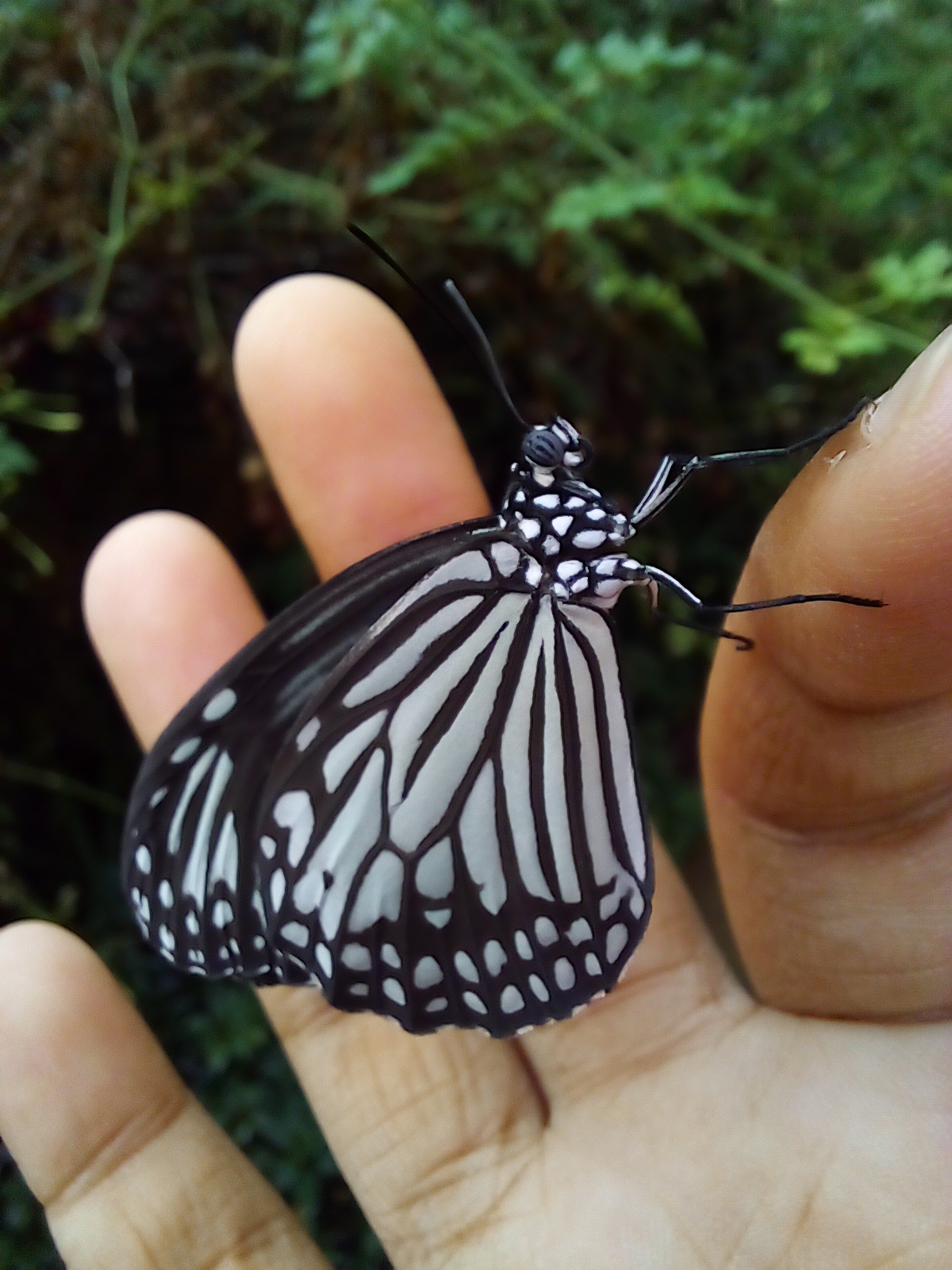
Newly-emerged butterfly

== Range ==
The species is found in the Western Ghats mountains, northeastern India, Sri Lanka, and the Malay Peninsula.

== See also ==
- Danainae
- Nymphalidae
- List of butterflies of India
- List of butterflies of India (Nymphalidae)
