= Cryptolepine =

Names
- Preferred IUPAC name 5-Methyl-5H-indolo[3,2-b]quinoline

Identifiers
CAS Number	480-26-2
3D model (JSmol)	Interactive image
ChEBI	CHEBI:3930
ChEMBL	ChEMBL92129
ChemSpider	74137
KEGG	C09142
PubChem CID	82143
UNII	OF1UIT4RDH
CompTox Dashboard (EPA)	DTXSID6037645
- InChI: InChI=1S/C16H12N2/c1-18-15-9-5-2-6-11(15)10-14-16(18)12-7-3-4-8-13(12)17-14/h2-10H,1H3 Key: KURWKDDWCJELSV-UHFFFAOYSA-N
- SMILES: N2=C1C(C=CC=C1)=C4C2=Cc3ccccc3N4C

Properties
Chemical formula	C_{16}H_{12}N_{2}
Molar mass	232.286 g·mol^{−1}
- Except where otherwise noted, data are given for materials in their standard state (at 25 °C [77 °F], 100 kPa). Infobox references

Cryptolepine is an alkaloid with antimalarial and cytotoxic properties, in vitro and in mice. It is able to intercalate into DNA at the cytosine-cytosine sites. Because of its toxicity, Cryptolepine is not considered appropriate for use as an anti-malarial drug in humans.

Cryptolepine can be found in the roots of the West African plant, Cryptolepis sanguinolenta.
