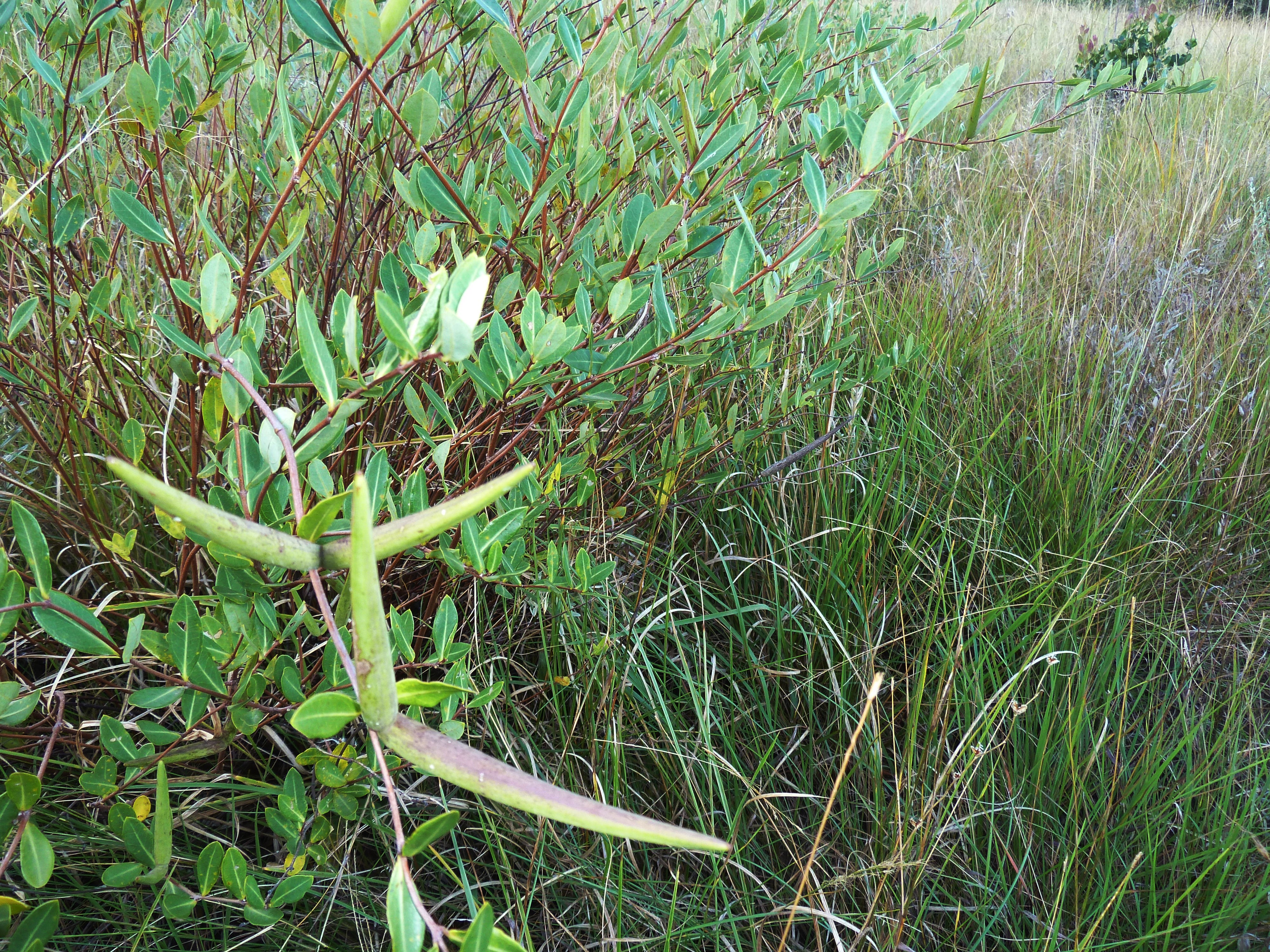
- Foliage and fruit

Scientific classification
- Kingdom: Plantae
- Clade: Tracheophytes
- Clade: Angiosperms
- Clade: Eudicots
- Clade: Asterids
- Order: Gentianales
- Family: Apocynaceae
- Genus: Cryptolepis
- Species: C. oblongifolia

Binomial name
- Cryptolepis oblongifolia (Meisn.) Schltr.

Synonyms
- Cryptolepis nigritana (Benth.) N.E.Br.; Ectadiopsis acutifolia Benth.; Ectadiopsis oblongifolia (Meisn.) Schltr.; Ectadium oblongifolium Meisn.

= Cryptolepis oblongifolia =

Species of plant

Cryptolepis oblongifolia, the red-stemmed milk rope, is a multi-stemmed shrub in the family Apocynaceae. It is native to moist and mesic regions of southern Africa, where it occurs in rocky grassland, grassy woodland or riverine vegetation. It is found from South Africa to Zambia. It grows about 1m tall, and carries widely spaced, opposite leaves on the reddish-brown stems. The yellow to reddish-yellow flowers appear in axillary clusters.
