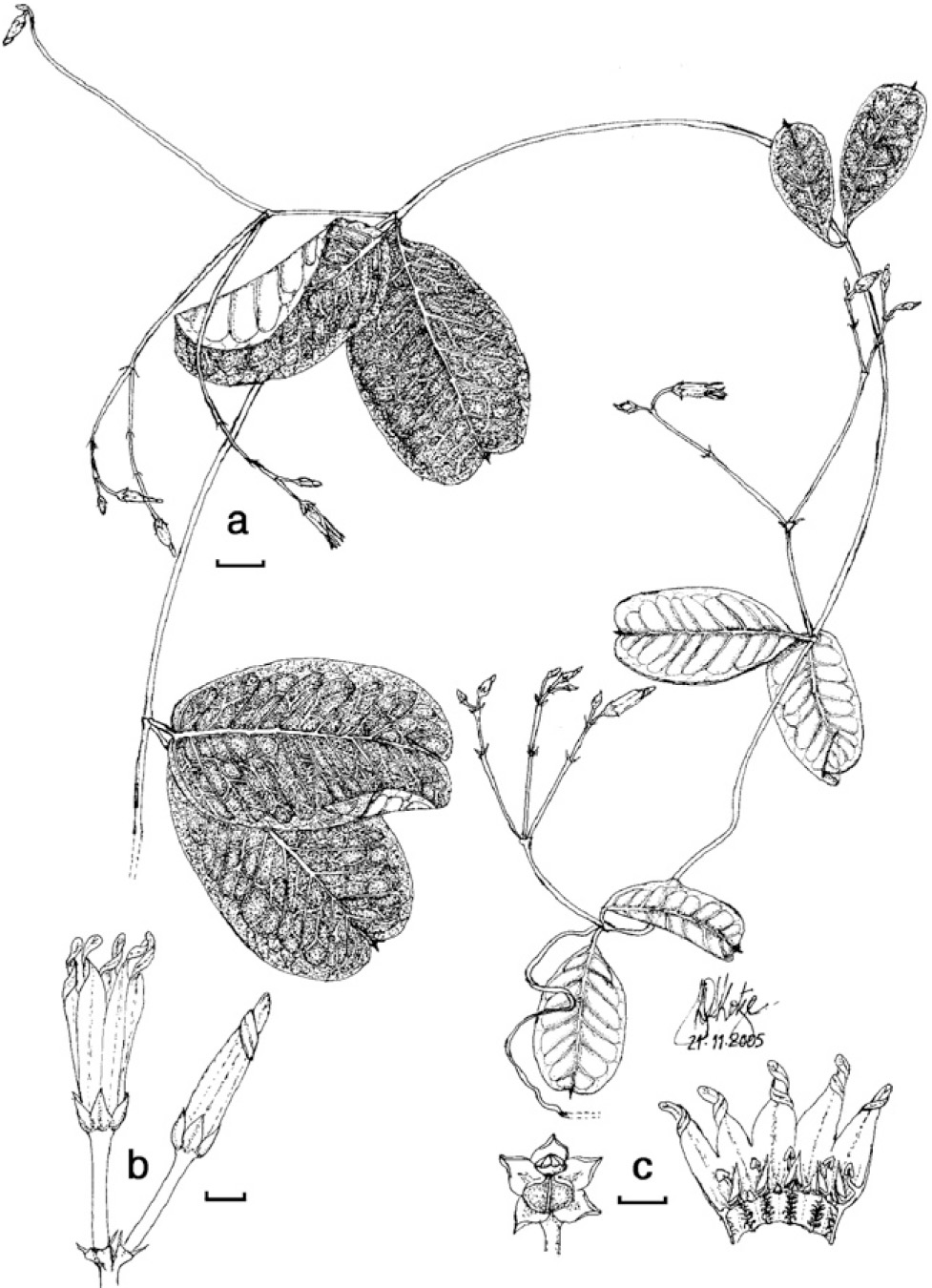
- Botanical illustration of Cryptolepis africana.

Scientific classification
- Kingdom: Plantae
- Clade: Tracheophytes
- Clade: Angiosperms
- Clade: Eudicots
- Clade: Asterids
- Order: Gentianales
- Family: Apocynaceae
- Genus: Cryptolepis
- Species: C. africana

Binomial name
- Cryptolepis africana (Bullock) Venter & R.L.Verh.

Synonyms
- Cryptolepis sinensis subsp. africana Bullock

= Cryptolepis africana =

Species of flowering plant

Cryptolepis africana is a species of plant in the Apocynaceae family. It is native to Kenya. Arthur Allman Bullock, the botanist who first formally described the species, using the synonymous subspecies name Cryptolepis sinensis subsp. africana, named it after the location where the sample he examined was collected in East Africa.

== Description ==
It is a climbing plant reaching 2–3 meters in height. Its brown, slender, twining stems have a rough to bumpy texture. The stem segments between leaves are about 15 centimeters long and 2 millimeters wide. Its leaves occur in pairs, arranged opposite one another. Its leathery, hairless, elliptical to oblong leaves are 6–8 by 3.5–5 centimeters. The tips of its leaves are blunt to slightly notched. The center of the leaf tips have abrupt, short, sharp, reddish points. The bases of the leaves are rounded to wedge-shaped. The leaves are green above, pale green below and have violet spots. Its hairless petioles are 5–10 millimeters long with a groove on their upper sides. The region between the petioles of adjacent leaves is ridged and have reddish, tooth-shaped secretory glands called colleters. Its branched, hairless, sparsely-flowered Inflorescences occur at the junctions between the leaves and stem. The inflorescences have slender primary peduncles that are 15–25 millimeters long, secondary peduncles that are 20–35 millimeters long, and pedicels that about 5 millimeters long with needle-shaped bracts that are 1 millimeters long. The oblong to oval flower buds are pointed and twisted in a spiral. Its flowers have 5 free, hairless, egg-shaped to triangular sepals that are 2 by 0.7 millimeters with pointed tips. The 5 cream-colored petals are fused at their base to form a 2 millimeter-long, bell-shaped tube. The petal tube is hairless on the outside, but has long, shaggy hairs on the inside. The linear to egg-shaped, hairless lobes of the petals are 7–8 by 1 millimeters with blunt to pointed tips. The flowers have a ring-like structure between the petals and its stamen called a corona. Its corona have 5 free, club-shaped, hairless, fleshy lobes that are 0.5 millimeters long and attached half-way up the petal tubes. Its stamen are inserted near the base of the petal tube. The stamen have rudimentary filaments and egg-shaped to triangular, cream-colored anthers that are covered in shaggy hairs. The anthers arch over or are fused to the stigma. Its ovaries are globe-shaped and hairless. Its compound, hairless, thin, tapering styles are about 1 millimeters long. Its hairless, triangular stigma with a cut-off shape at the top.

=== Reproductive biology ===
The pollen of Cryptolepis africana is shed as permanent tetrads.

=== Distribution and habitat ===
It has been observed growing in lowland coastal forests at elevations of 60–80 meters.
