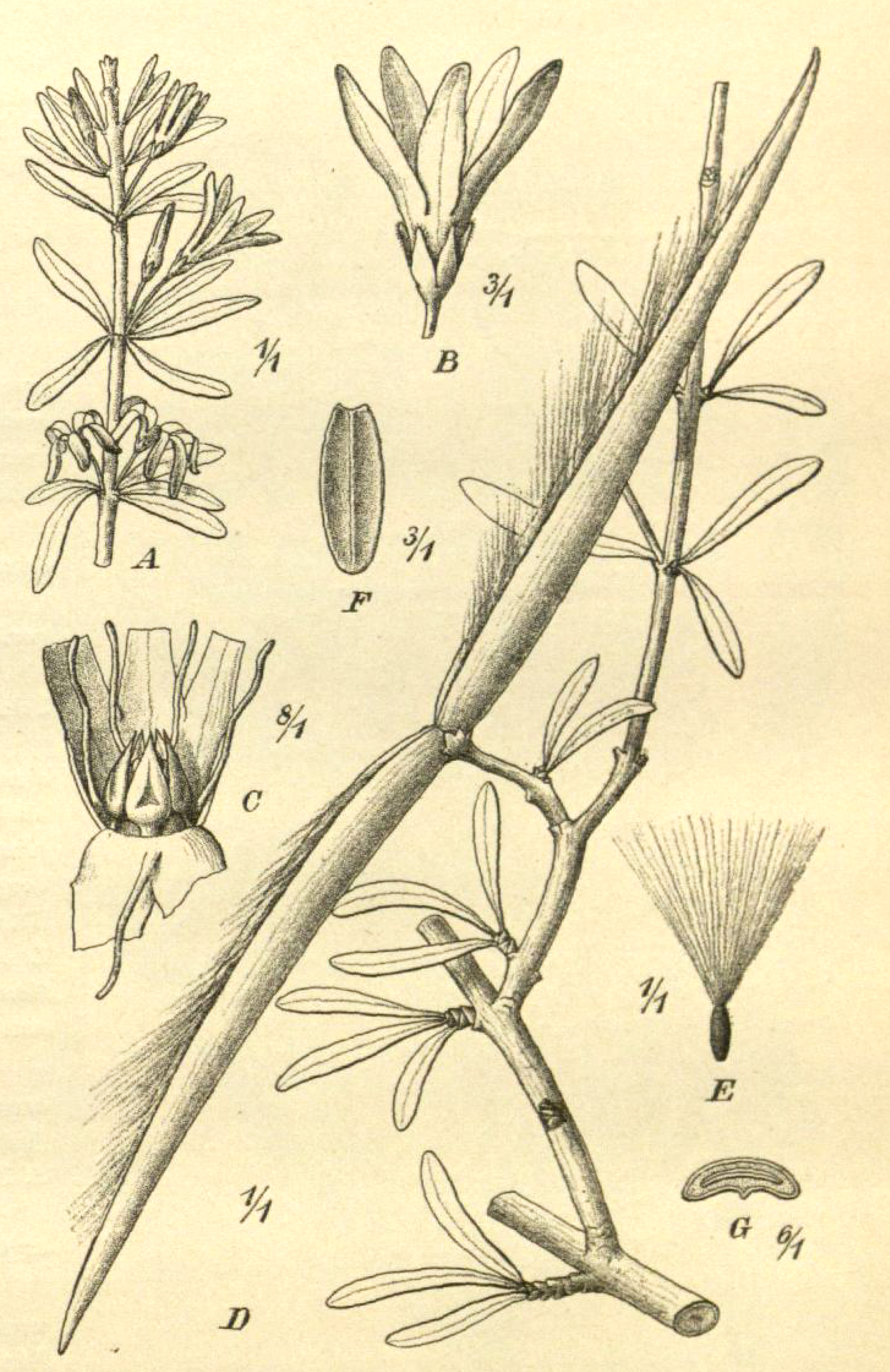
- A botanical illustration of Cryptolepis decidua (published using the synonymous name Curroria decidua).

Scientific classification
- Kingdom: Plantae
- Clade: Tracheophytes
- Clade: Angiosperms
- Clade: Eudicots
- Clade: Asterids
- Order: Gentianales
- Family: Apocynaceae
- Genus: Cryptolepis
- Species: C. decidua

Binomial name
- Cryptolepis decidua (Planch. ex Benth.) N.E.Br.

Synonyms
- Curroria decidua Planch. ex Benth.

= Cryptolepis decidua =

Species of flowering plant

Cryptolepis decidua is a species of plant in the Apocynaceae family. It is native to Angola, Botswana, Namibia, and South Africa. George Bentham, the botanist who first formally described the species, named it after its falling (deciduus in Latin) leaves that leave behind overlapping persistent petiole bases.

== Description ==
It is a shrub reaching 1.5 meters in height. Its straight, slender, stems have pale grey bark. Its leaves occur in clusters. Its hairless, linear to slightly spatula-shaped leaves are 1.9–2.5 by 0.25–0.5 centimeters. The tips of its leaves are blunt or slightly pointed. The base of the leaves terminate in a rudimentary petiole. When the leaves fall, the petioles persist and form overlapping stacks. Its solitary flowers occur at the junction of the leaves and stem, and because the leaves are clustered can occur in groups of two or more. The flowers are on pedicels that are 0.8–1.9 centimeters long. The pedicels have slender hairless bracts midway up their length. The flower buds are twisted in a spiral. Its flowers have 5 lance-shaped sepals that are 2.5 millimeters long with pointed tips. The 5 petals are fused at their base to form a 2.5 millimeter-long, bell-shaped tube. The lance-shaped, hairless lobes of the petals are 7.6 millimeters long. The flowers have a ring-like structure between the petals and its stamen called a corona. Its corona have 5 thread-like, lobes that are 3.8–5.1 millimeters long and attached half-way up the petal tubes. Its stamen have tapering anthers that arch over the stigma. The styles of the pistils are shorter than the anthers and have cone-shaped tops.

=== Reproductive biology ===
The pollen of Cryptolepis decidua is shed as permanent tetrads.

=== Distribution and habitat ===
It has been observed growing at elevations up to 2000 meters.

=== Uses ===
Its roots have been reported as being used as a traditional medicine in Namibia and extracts from its tissues have been shown to have immunomodulatory activity in laboratory tests with isolated human blood cells. It has also been included in lists of South African poisonous plants.
