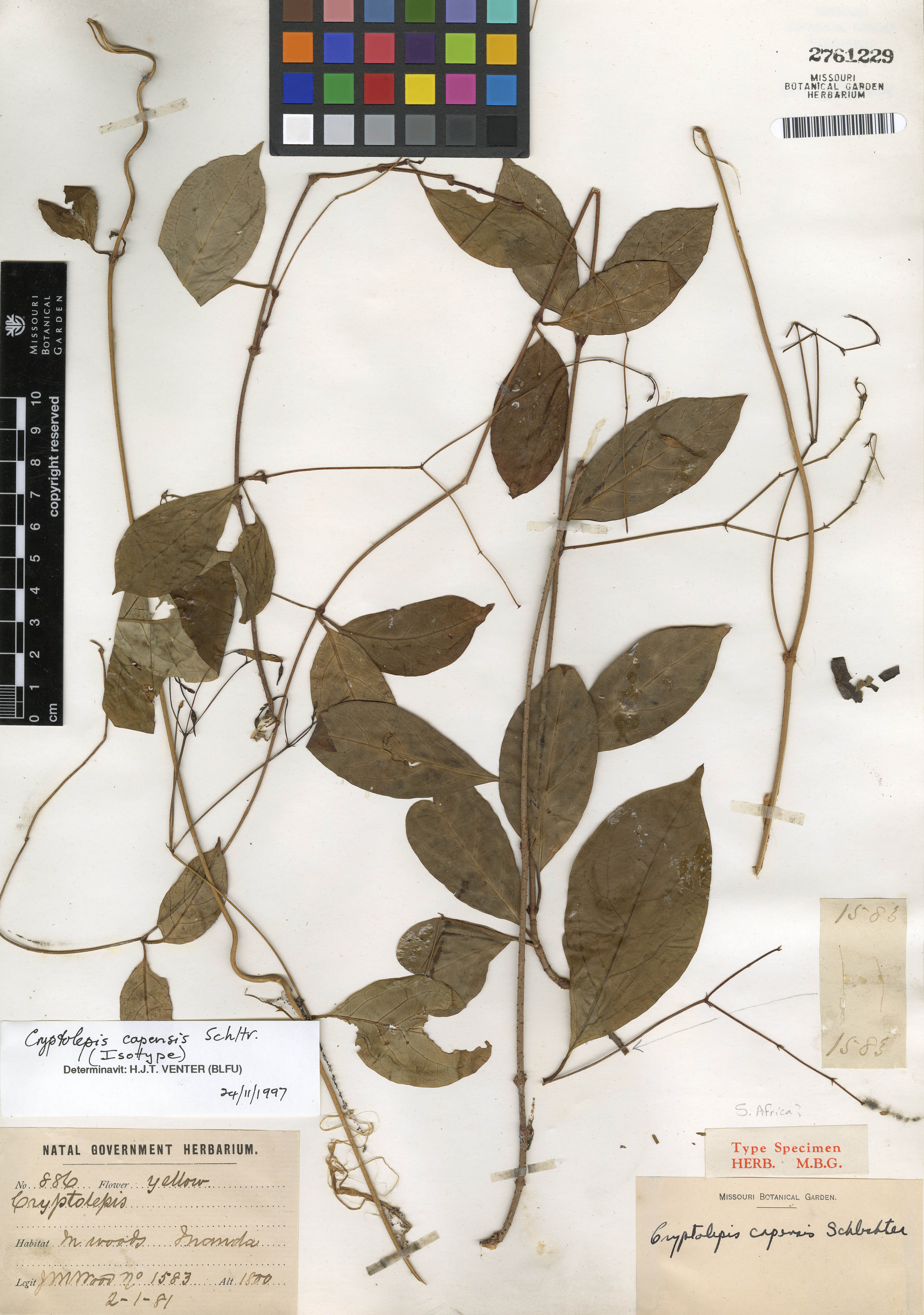
- Herbarium specimen of Cryptolepis capensis .

Scientific classification
- Kingdom: Plantae
- Clade: Tracheophytes
- Clade: Angiosperms
- Clade: Eudicots
- Clade: Asterids
- Order: Gentianales
- Family: Apocynaceae
- Genus: Cryptolepis
- Species: C. capensis

Binomial name
- Cryptolepis capensis Schltr.

= Cryptolepis capensis =

Species of flowering plant

Cryptolepis capensis is a species of plant in the Apocynaceae family. It is native to South Africa and Eswatini. Rudolf Schlechter, the botanist who first formally described the species, named it after the region where the sample he examined was collected in South Africa.

== Description ==
It is a climbing plant. Its woody, slender, hairless twining stems have minute bumps. Its thin, hairless, lance-shaped to elliptical leaves are 3.8–8.9 by 1.3–4.4 centimeters. The tips of its leaves are ae variable ranging from pointed, tapering or ending abruptly with a sharp point. The bases of the leaves are pointed. Its petioles are 5.1–15.2 millimeters long. Its branched, hairless, sparsely-flowered Inflorescences occur at the junctions between the leaves and stem or near the ends of stems. The inflorescences have peduncles that are 1.9–5.7 centimeters long, and pedicels that are 1.3–2.5 centimeters long with hairless bracts that are 1.3–2.5 millimeters long. The flower buds, which have long tapering tips, are twisted in a spiral. Its flowers have 5 hairless, oblong to lance-shaped sepals that are 3.8 by 1.7 millimeters with pointed tips. The 5 petals are fused at their base to form a 5.1–7 millimeter-long, bell-shaped tube. The lance-shaped, hairless lobes of the petals are 10.6–12.7 by 3.2–3.8 millimeters with tapering tips. The flowers have a ring-like structure between the petals and its stamen called a corona. Its corona have 5 free, oval to diamond-shaped, fleshy lobes that are 0.3–1.3 millimeters long and attached half-way up the petal tubes. Its stamen are inserted about 1.9 millimeters above petal tube's base. The stamen have rudimentary filaments and oval anthers that are 1.3 millimeters long with tapering tips. The anthers arch over the stigma. Its slightly bumpy, slender, cylindrical, fruit are 10.2–21.6 by 0.3–1.3 centimeters with tapering tips. Its linear to oblong, hairless, dark brown seeds are 0.25 by 1.3 centimeters. The seeds are concave on one side and convex on the other. The convex side of the seeds have raised irregular lines.

=== Reproductive biology ===
The pollen of Cryptolepis capensis is shed as permanent tetrads.

=== Distribution and habitat ===
It has been observed growing in forests at elevations up to 600 meters.

=== Uses ===
Its roots have been reported as being used as a traditional medicine by the Tsonga people.
