= Cryptolepis sanguinolenta =

Scientific classification
- Kingdom: Plantae
- Clade: Tracheophytes
- Clade: Angiosperms
- Clade: Eudicots
- Clade: Asterids
- Order: Gentianales
- Family: Apocynaceae
- Genus: Cryptolepis
- Species: C. sanguinolenta

Binomial name
- Cryptolepis sanguinolenta (Lindl.) Schltr.

Species of flowering plant

Cryptolepis sanguinolenta is a species of flowering plant in the family Apocynaceae. An extract from the root is traditionally used in West Africa for malaria.

The roots of Cryptolepis sanguinolenta contain a major alkaloid called cryptolepine.

The roots are also used as a yellow dye.

== Description ==
Cryptolepis sanguinolenta is a woody climbing shrub with slender branches that can grow up to 8 cm long. It exudes a yellowish to orange latex that turns red upon exposure. The leaves are opposite, simple and petiolate; the petiole can reach 15 mm long. Leaflets are ovate to elliptical in shape, up to 10 cm long and 6 cm wide, margin entire, and the apex is acuminate while base tends to be cuneate to rounded. Flowers are arranged in axillary panicles and the corolla is tube-like and yellow.

== Distribution and habitat ==
Distributed in West and Central Africa from Senegal eastwards to the Central African Republic and southwards to Uganda and Angola. Found in savannas and in montane, dry and gallery forests.

== Chemistry ==
The alkaloid cryptolepine has been isolated from root of the plant and so are two isomers of crytolepine, neocryptolepine and Isocryptolepine.

== Uses ==
Roots of the plant are traded as a source of yellow dye for leather and textiles.
