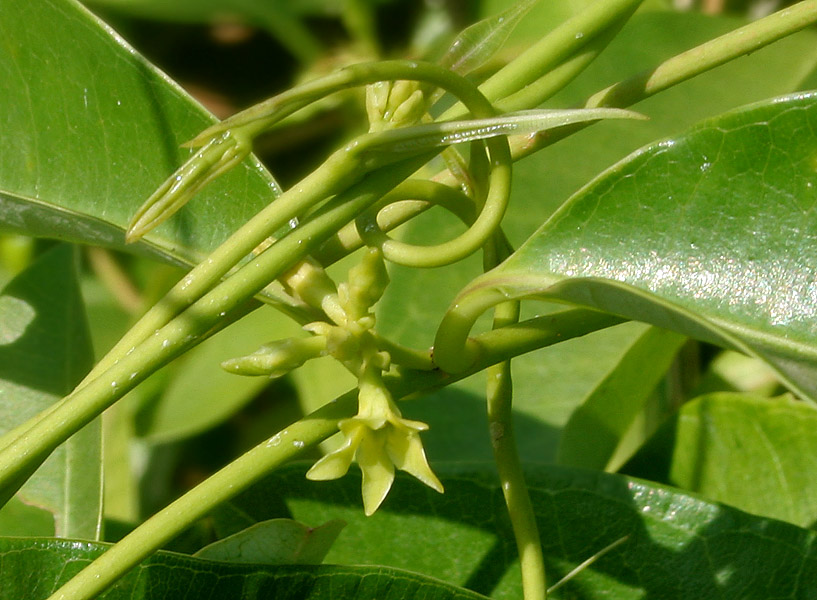
- Cryptolepis dubia

Scientific classification
- Kingdom: Plantae
- Clade: Tracheophytes
- Clade: Angiosperms
- Clade: Eudicots
- Clade: Asterids
- Order: Gentianales
- Family: Apocynaceae
- Subfamily: Periplocoideae
- Genus: Cryptolepis; R.Br., On Asclepiad. 58. 3 Apr 1810.

Type species
- Cryptolepis buchananii R.Br. ex Roem. & Schult.

Species
- See text

Synonyms
- Cochlanthus Balf.f., Proc. Roy. Soc. Edinburgh 12: 78. 1883.; Curroria Planch. ex Benth.; Ectadiopsis Benth., in Bentham et J. D. Hooker, Gen. 2: 741. Mai 1876.; Lepistoma Blume, Fl. Javae (Praef.) vii. 5 Aug 1828.; Leposma Blume, Bijdr. 1049. Oct 1826-Nov 1827.; Mangenotia Pichon, Bull. Soc. Bot. France 101: 246. post 25 Jun 1954.; Mitolepis Balf.f., Proc. Roy. Soc. Edinburgh 12: 78. 1883.; Socotranthus Kuntze in Post et O. Kuntze, Lex. 523. Dec 1903.; Stomatostemma (possible synonym) N.E.Br. in Thiselton-Dyer, Fl. Trop. Africa 4(1): 252. Dec 1902.

= Cryptolepis (plant) =

Milk ropes

Genus of plants

Cryptolepis is a plant genus in the family Apocynaceae. It includes some 42 species.

== Selected species ==
- Cryptolepis africana (Bullock) Venter & R.L.Verh.
- Cryptolepis albicans Jum. & H.Perrier
- Cryptolepis angolensis Welw. ex Hiern
- Cryptolepis apiculata K.Schum.
- Cryptolepis arbuscula (Radcl.-Sm.) Venter
- Cryptolepis baumii N.E.Br.
- Cryptolepis brazzaei Baill.
- Cryptolepis buchanani
- Cryptolepis buxifolia Chiov.
- Cryptolepis capensis Schltr.
- Cryptolepis cryptolepioides (Schltr.) Bullock
- Cryptolepis decidua (Planch. ex Benth.) N.E.Br.
- Cryptolepis delagoensis Schltr.
- Cryptolepis dubia (Burm.f.) M.R.Almeida
- Cryptolepis hypoglauca
- Cryptolepis oblongifolia (Meisn.) Schltr.
- Cryptolepis obtusa
- Cryptolepis ruspolii Chiov.
- Cryptolepis sanguinolenta (Lindl.) Schltr.
- Cryptolepis sinensis (Lour.) Merr.
- Cryptolepis sizenandii Rolfe
- Cryptolepis socotrana (Balf.f.) Venter
- Cryptolepis somaliensis Venter & Thulin
- Cryptolepis stefianinii Chiov.
- Cryptolepis suffruticosa N.E.Br.
- Cryptolepis triangularis
- Cryptolepis volubilis (Balf.f.) O.Schwartz
- Cryptolepis welwitschii Hiern
- Cryptolepis yemenensis Venter & R.L.Verh.

== Excluded or synonymous taxa ==
- C. buchananii, a synonym for C. dubia (Burm.f.) M.R.Almeida
- C. elegans, a synonym for C. sinensis (Lour.) Merr.
- C. edithae, a synonym for C. sinensis (Lour.) Merr.
