= Cryptolepis delagoensis =

Scientific classification
- Kingdom: Plantae
- Clade: Tracheophytes
- Clade: Angiosperms
- Clade: Eudicots
- Clade: Asterids
- Order: Gentianales
- Family: Apocynaceae
- Genus: Cryptolepis
- Species: C. delagoensis

Binomial name
- Cryptolepis delagoensis Schltr.

Species of flowering plant

Cryptolepis delagoensis is a species of plant in the Apocynaceae family. It is native to Mozambique and South Africa. Rudolf Schlechter, the botanist who first formally described the species, named it after the location where the specimen he examined was found near Maputo Bay which was then called Delagoa Bay.

== Description ==
It is a twining plant. Its stems are hairless. Its hairless, papery, elliptical to lance-shaped leaves are 1.5–2.5 by 0.5–0.9 centimeters. The tips of its leaves are pointed to abruptly pointed. The undersides of the leaves are pale. Its petioles are 1.3–2.5 millimeters long. Its short, branched, hairless, Inflorescences have 2–4 flowers. The flowers are on hairless pedicels that are 1.3–1.9 millimeters long. Its flowers have 5 oval, hairless sepals that are 2.5 millimeters long with blunt tips. The 5 petals are fused at their base to form a 3.8 millimeter-long, bell-shaped tube. The oblong, hairless lobes of the petals have blunt tips. The flowers have a ring-like structure between the petals and its stamen called a corona. Its corona have 5 oblong, hairless lobes that have blunt tips and are attached below the throat of the petal tubes. Its stamen have very short filaments and hairless anthers that are lance-shaped to spearheaded. The stigma. The pistils have short conical stigma.

=== Reproductive biology ===
The pollen of Cryptolepis delagoensis is shed as permanent tetrads.

=== Distribution and habitat ===
It has been observed growing in sandy soil.
