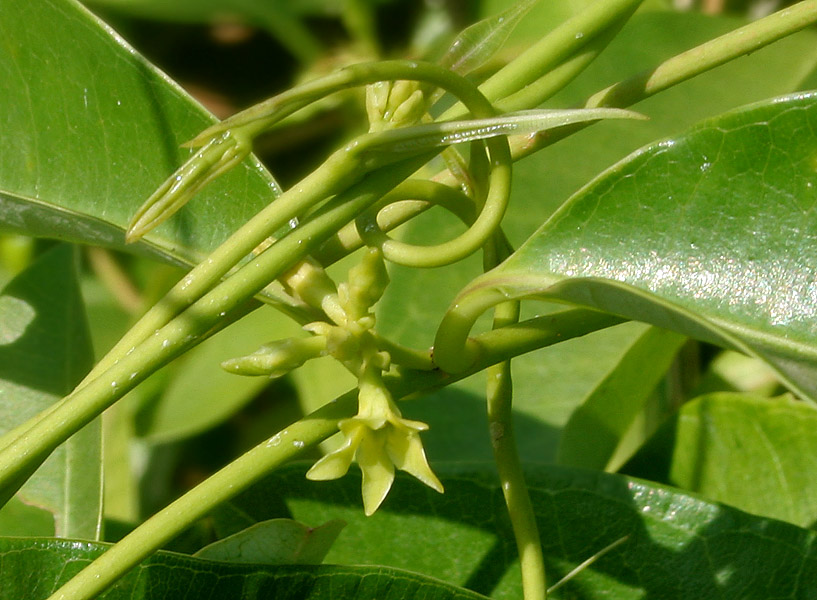
- Leaves and buds

Scientific classification
- Kingdom: Plantae
- Clade: Tracheophytes
- Clade: Angiosperms
- Clade: Eudicots
- Clade: Asterids
- Order: Gentianales
- Family: Apocynaceae
- Genus: Cryptolepis
- Species: C. dubia

Binomial name
- Cryptolepis dubia (Burm.f.) M.R.Almeida

Synonyms
- Cryptolepis buchananii Roem. & Schult.; Cryptolepis reticulata (Roth) Wall. ex Steud.; Nerium reticulatum Roxb.; Periploca dubia Burm.f.; Trachelospermum cavaleriei H.Lév.; Trachelospermum gracilipes var. cavaleriei (H. Lév.) C.K. Schneid.; Echites reticulatus (Roxb.) Roth

= Cryptolepis dubia =

Species of plant

Cryptolepis dubia is a species of flowering plant in the family Apocynaceae that can be found in South and Southeast Asia, as well as southern China.
