= Flora Sinensis =

Natural history books about China

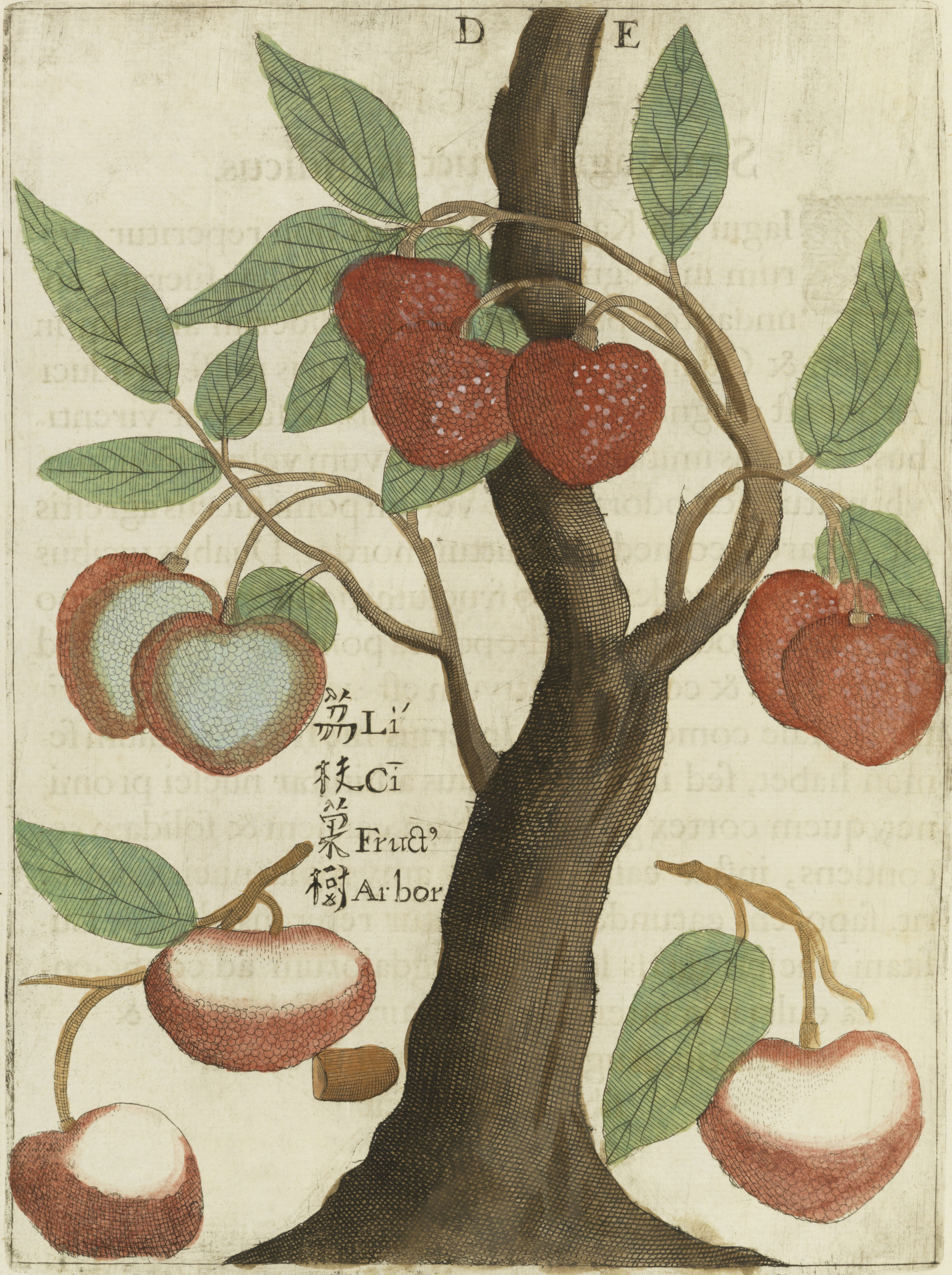
Drawing of a lychee, in Boym's Flora Sinensis.

Flora Sinensis is one of the first European natural history books about China, published in Vienna in 1656. Its author, Michał Boym, was a Jesuit missionary from Poland (then the Polish–Lithuanian Commonwealth).

== Focus on the ecosystem of the Far East ==
The book was the first description of an ecosystem of the Far East published in Europe. Boym underlined the medicinal properties of the Chinese plants.

== Seeking patronage by the Shunzhi Emperor and Leopold I, King of Hungary ==
The book also included pleas for support of the Catholic Church to the Shunzhi Emperor, the Chinese emperor at the time; each page contained a chronogram pointing to the date of 1655, the date of coronation of Emperor Leopold I as the King of Hungary, as Boym wanted to gain the support of that monarch for his mission.

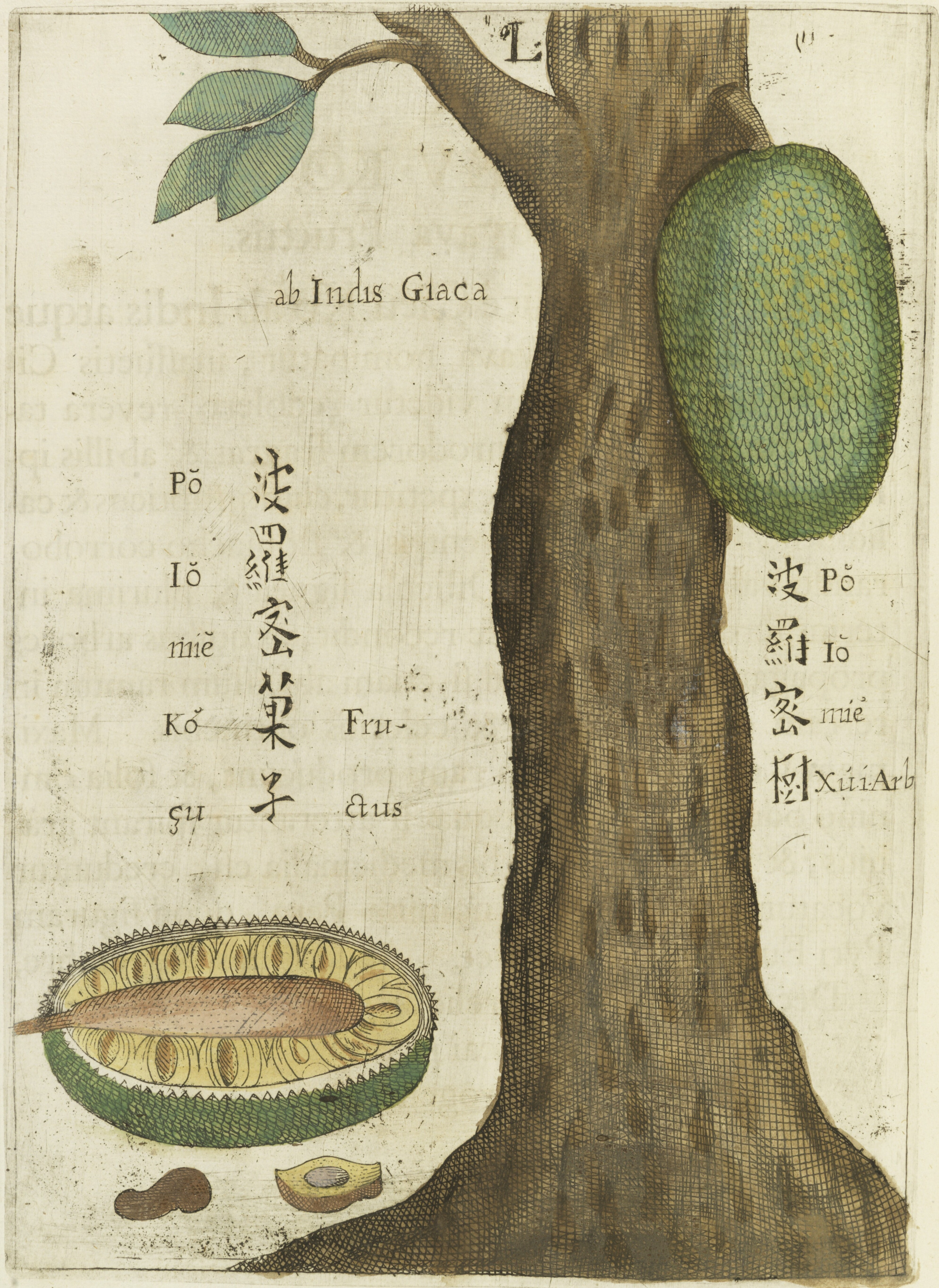
Jackfruit

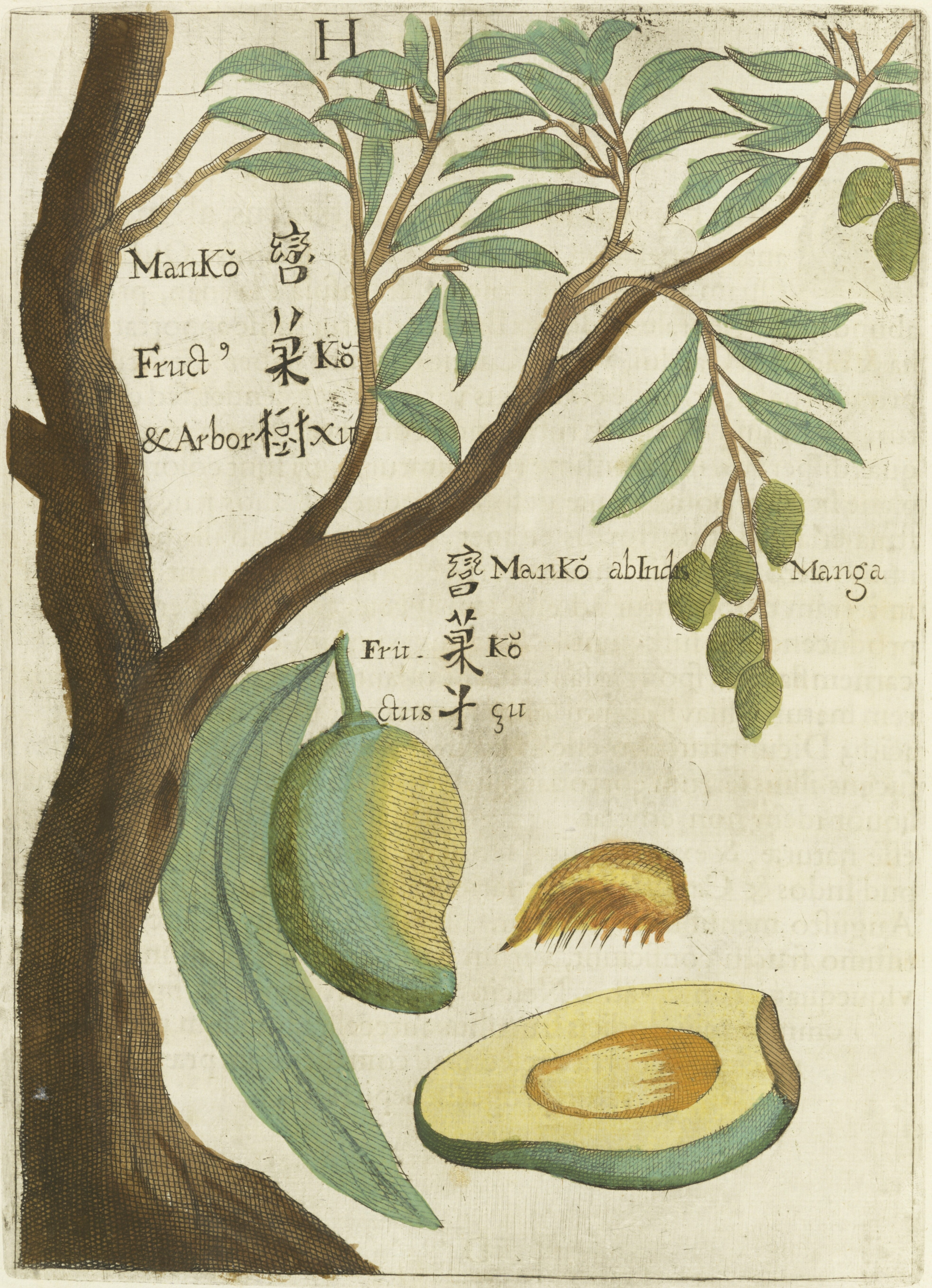
Mango

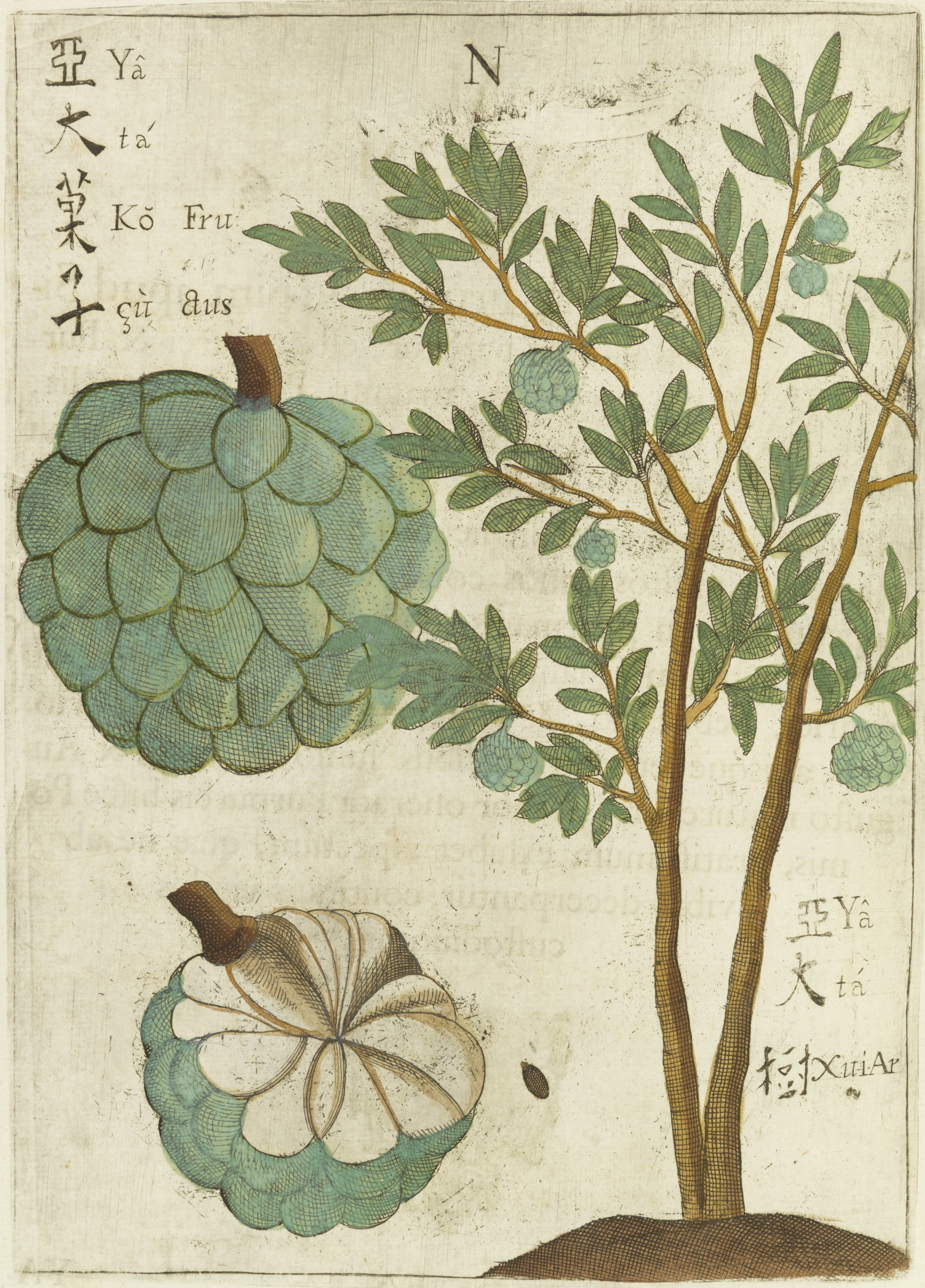
Drawing of, probably, the sugar-apple

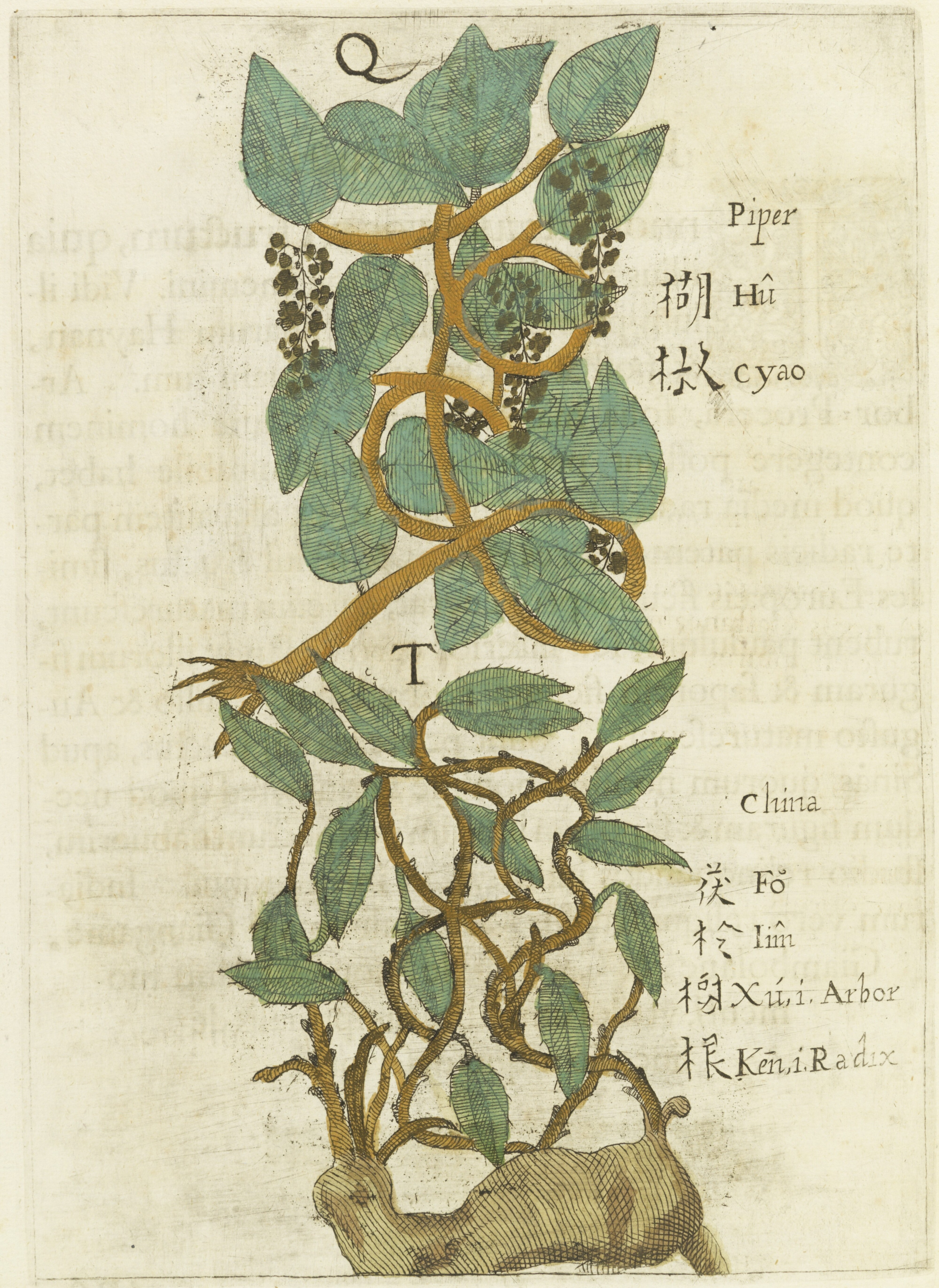
Pepper

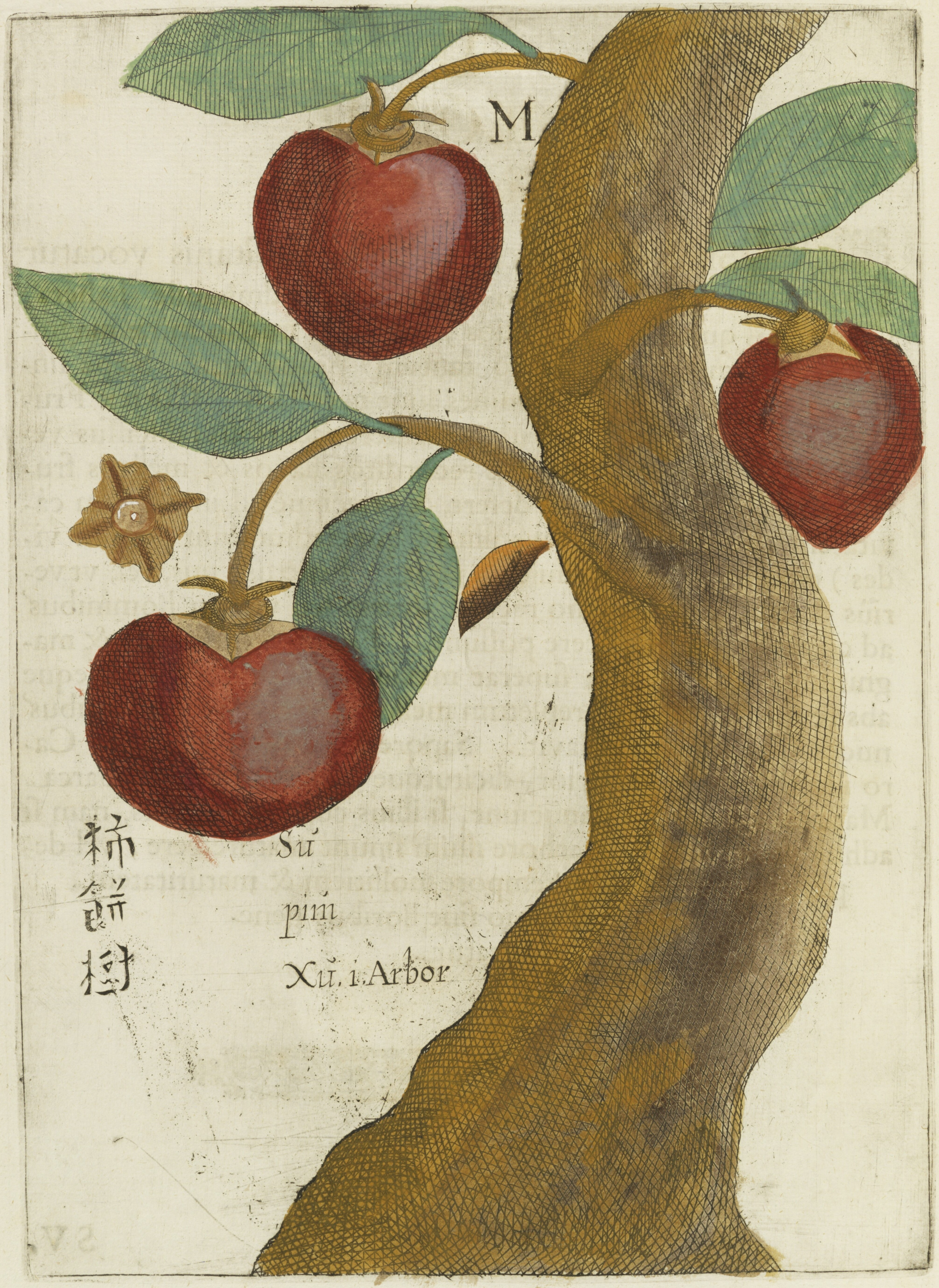
Persimmon Tree

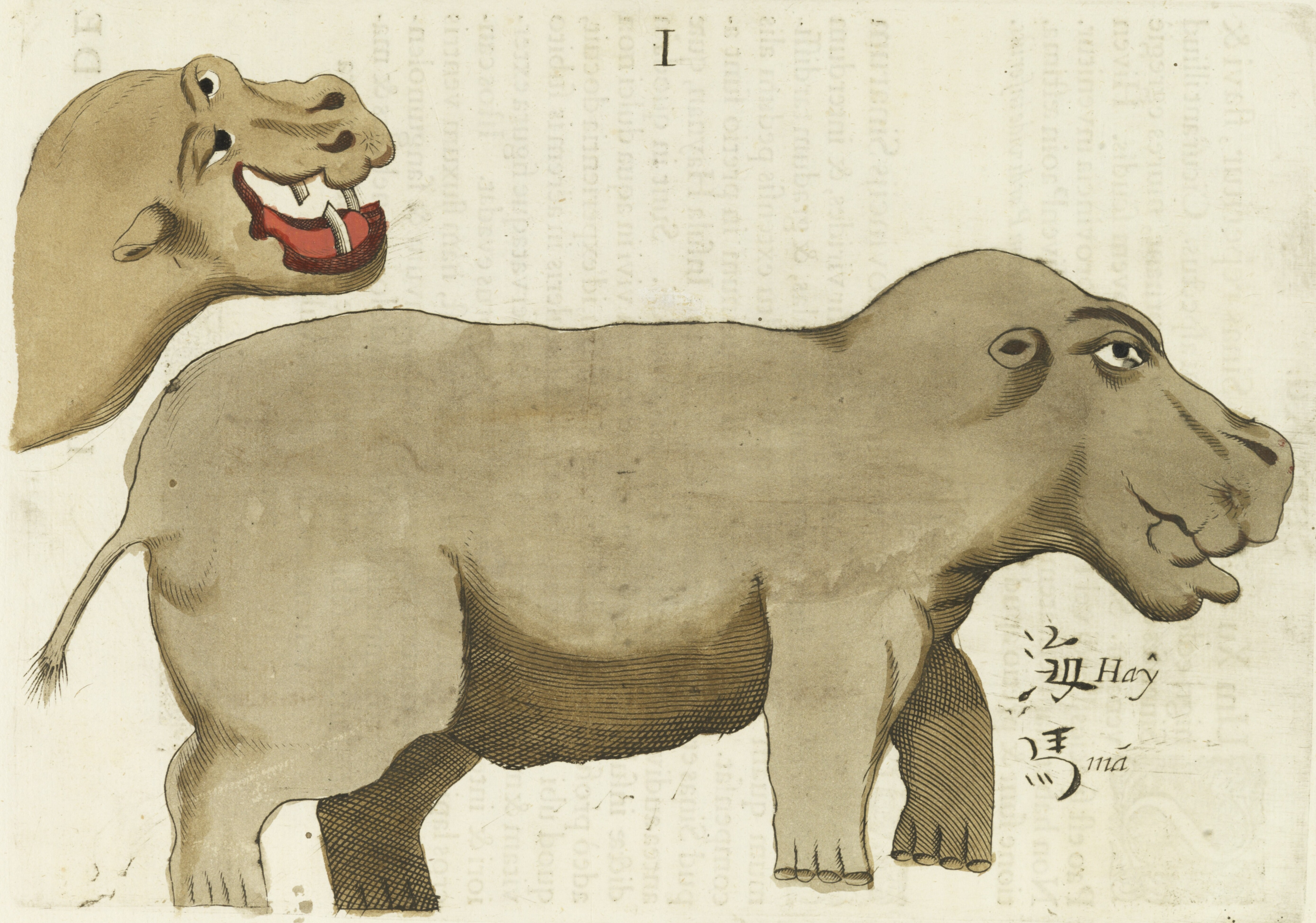
Hippopotamus

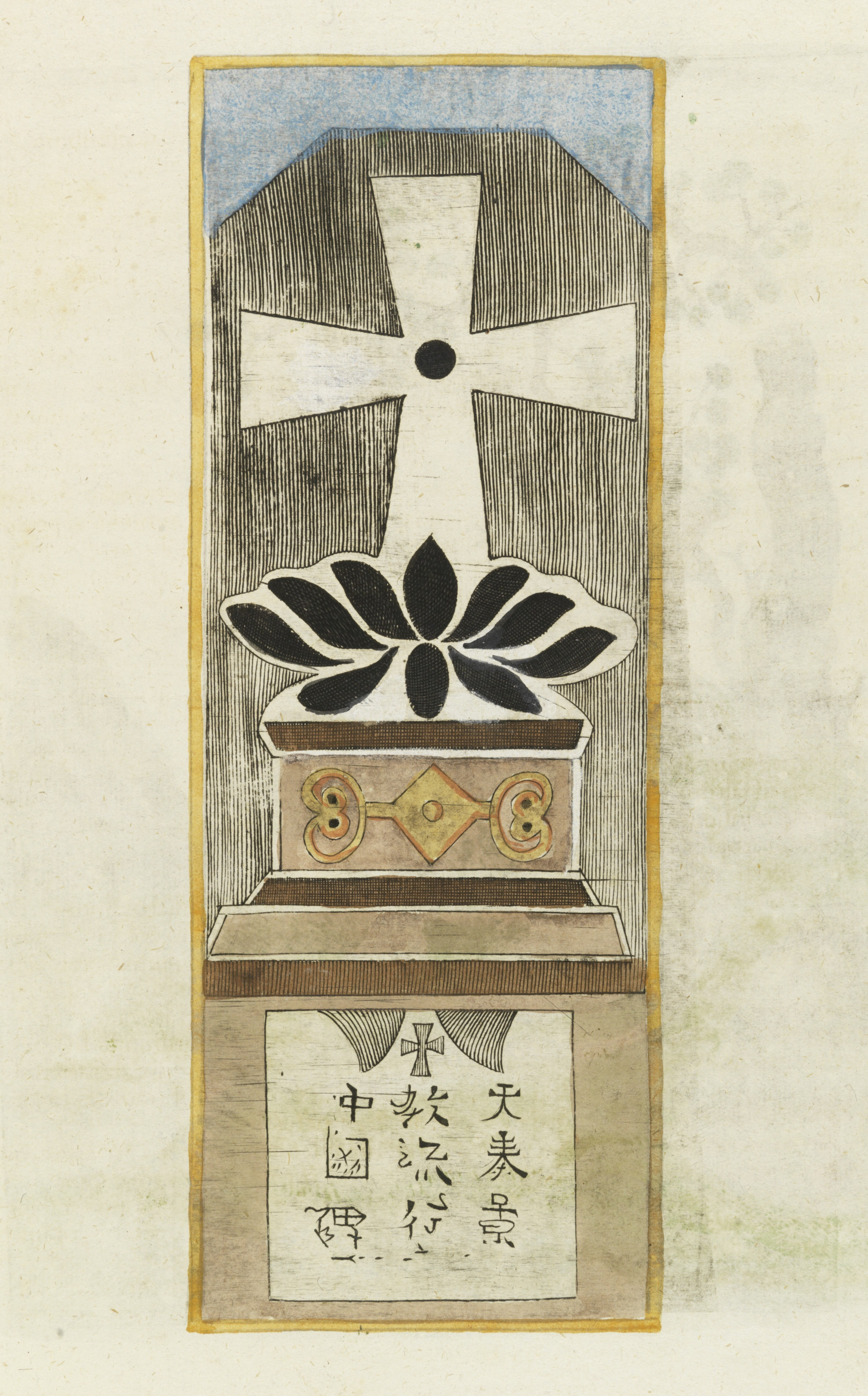
Church of the East in China
