= Cryptolepis sinensis =

Scientific classification
- Kingdom: Plantae
- Clade: Tracheophytes
- Clade: Angiosperms
- Clade: Eudicots
- Clade: Asterids
- Order: Gentianales
- Family: Apocynaceae
- Genus: Cryptolepis
- Species: C. sinensis

Binomial name
- Cryptolepis sinensis (Lour.) Merr.

Synonyms
- List: Emericia sinensis (Lour.) Roem. & Schult.; Pergularia sinensis Lour.; Vallaris sinensis (Lour.) G.Don; Aganosma edithae Hance; Apocynum orixense Rottler ex Hook.f.; Cryptolepis edithae (Hance) Benth. & Hook.f. ex Maxim.; Cryptolepis elegans Wall. ex G.Don; Cryptolepis elegans var. ciliata Pierre ex Costantin; Cryptolepis laxiflora Blume; Cryptolepis pauciflora Wight; Cryptolepis sinensis var. ciliata (Costantin) P.H.Hô; Echites pauciflorus Rottler ex Hook.f.; Nerium pauciflorum Roxb. ex Hook.f.; Periploca chinensis Spreng.; Streptocaulon chinense (Spreng.) G.Don; Strophanthus divaricatus Wall. ex G.Don

Species of plant

Cryptolepis sinensis is a species of flowering plant in the family Apocynaceae. It is native to Taiwan, China (Guangdong, Guangxi, Guizhou, Hainan, Yunnan) and southeast Asia (Cambodia, India, Indonesia, Malaysia, and Vietnam).

Cryptolepis sinensis is one of the food sources for the common crow (Euploea core), a common butterfly found in South Asia. USDA, ARS, National Genetic Resources Program. Germplasm Resources Information Network – (GRIN) [Data from 07-Oct-06].
