= List of Southern African indigenous trees and woody lianes =

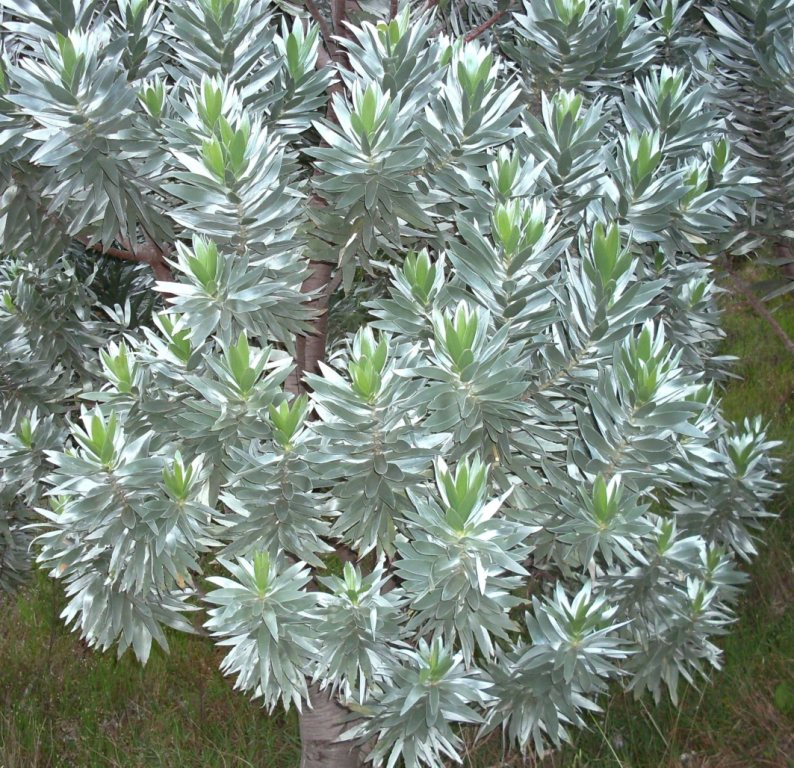
Foliage of the Silvertree (Leucadendron argenteum)

This is a list of Southern African trees, shrubs, suffrutices, geoxyles and lianes, and is intended to cover Angola, Botswana, Eswatini, Lesotho, Malawi, Mozambique, Namibia, South Africa, Zambia and Zimbabwe.

The notion of 'indigenous' is of necessity a blurred concept, and is clearly a function of both time and political boundaries. The global distribution of plants useful to humans, or inadvertently transported by them, is closely linked to a mapping of their journeys and settlements, and the movement of species in prehistoric times must be inferred from archaeological and palaeontological remains, centers of diversity, DNA samples and other sources.

== Cyatheaceae ==
- Cyathea capensis (L.f.) J.E. Sm. (Hemitelia capensis Kaulf.)
- Cyathea dregei Kunze (Alsophila dregei (Kunze) R.M. Tryon)
- Cyathea manniana Hook.
- Alsophila thomsonii (Baker) R.M. Tryon (Cyathea thomsonii Baker)

== Blechnaceae ==
- Lomariocycas tabularis (Thunb.) Kuhn

== Cycadaceae ==
- Cycas thouarsii R.Br.

== Zamiaceae ==
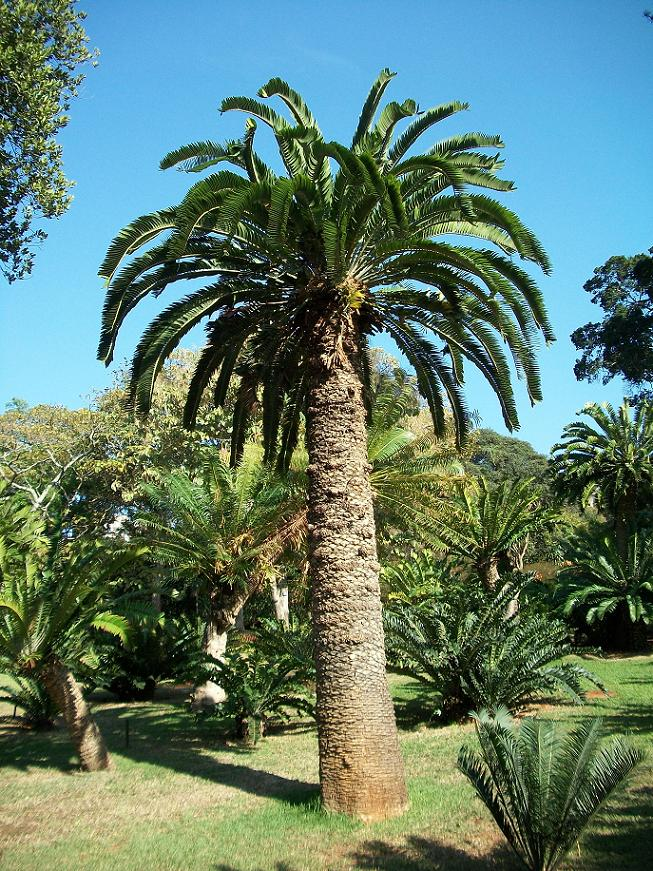
Encephalartos woodii

- Encephalartos aemulans Vorster
- Encephalartos altensteinii Lehm.
- Encephalartos cupidus R.A. Dyer
- Encephalartos dolomiticus Lavranos & D.L. Goode
- Encephalartos eugene-maraisii Verdoorn
- Encephalartos ferox Bertol.f.
- Encephalartos friderici-guilielmi Lehm.
- Encephalartos ghellinckii Lem.
- Encephalartos heenanii R.A. Dyer
- Encephalartos hirsutus P.J.H.Hurter
- Encephalartos humilis Verdoorn
- Encephalartos inopinus R.A. Dyer
- Encephalartos lanatus Stapf & Burtt Davy
- Encephalartos laevifolius Stapf & Burtt Davy
- Encephalartos latifrons Lehm.
- Encephalartos lebomboensis Verdoorn
- Encephalartos lehmannii Lehm.
- Encephalartos longifolius (Jacq.) Lehm.
- Encephalartos manikensis (Gilliland) Gilliland
- Encephalartos middelburgensis Vorster, Robbertse & S.van der Westh.
- Encephalartos natalensis R.A. Dyer & Verdoorn
- Encephalartos paucidentatus Stapf & Burtt Davy
- Encephalartos princeps R.A. Dyer
- Encephalartos schmitzii Malaisse
- Encephalartos transvenosus Stapf & Burtt Davy
- Encephalartos umbeluziensis R.A. Dyer
- Encephalartos villosus Lem.
- Encephalartos woodii Sander

== Podocarpaceae ==
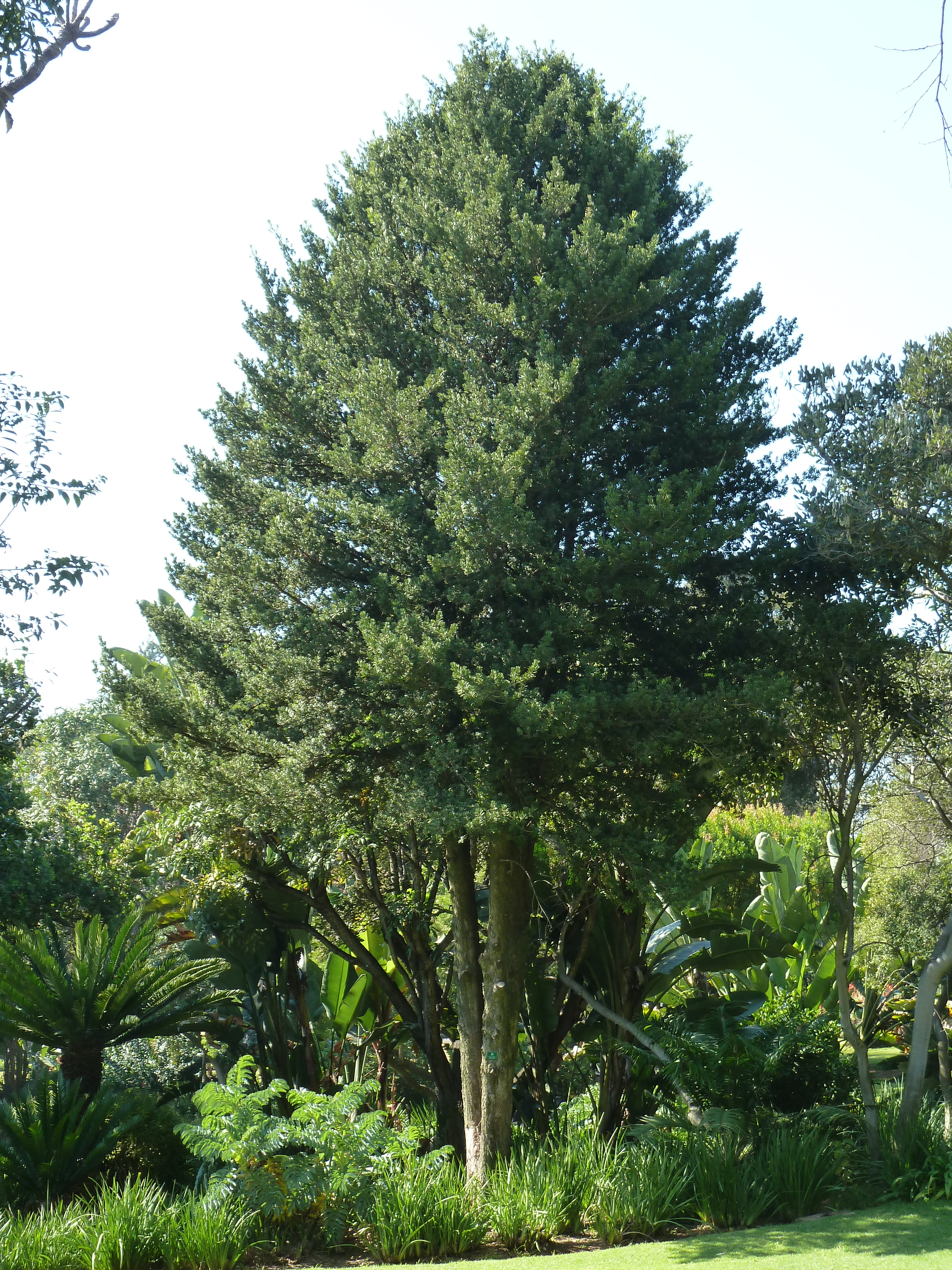
Podocarpus latifolius

- Afrocarpus falcatus (Thunb.) C.N.Page
- Podocarpus elongatus L'Herit. ex Pers.
- Podocarpus henkelii Stapf ex Dallim. & Jacks.
- Podocarpus latifolius (Thunb.) R.Br. ex Mirb.
- Podocarpus milanjianus Rendle

== Cupressaceae ==
- Widdringtonia nodiflora (L.) Powrie (Widdringtonia cupressoides (L.) Endl.)
- Widdringtonia schwarzii (Marloth) Mast.
- Widdringtonia wallichii Endl. ex Carrière (Widdringtonia cedarbergensis J.A.Marsh)
- Widdringtonia whytei Rendle
- Juniperus procera Hochst. ex Endl.

== Welwitschiaceae ==
- Welwitschia mirabilis Hook.f. (Welwitschia bainesii (Hook.f.) Carr.)

== Poaceae ==
- Thamnocalamus tessellatus (Nees) Soderstrom & R.P.Ellis (Arundinaria tessellata)
- Oreobambos buchwaldii K.Schum.
- Oxytenanthera abyssinica (A.Rich.) Munro

== Pandanaceae ==
- Pandanus livingstonianus Rendle

== Arecaceae ==
- Phoenix reclinata Jacq.
- Hyphaene coriacea Gaertn. (Hyphaene natalensis Kunze, Hyphaene crinita)
- Hyphaene petersiana Klotzsch ex Mart. (Hyphaene benguelensis Welw. ex H.Wendl.) (Hyphaene ventricosa J.Kirk)
- Borassus aethiopum Mart.
- Raphia australis Oberm. & Strey
- Raphia farinifera (Gaertn.) Hyl.
- Jubaeopsis afra Becc.

== Araceae ==
- Culcasia scandens P.Beauv.

== Flagellariaceae ==
- Flagellaria guineensis Schumach.

== Asphodelaceae ==
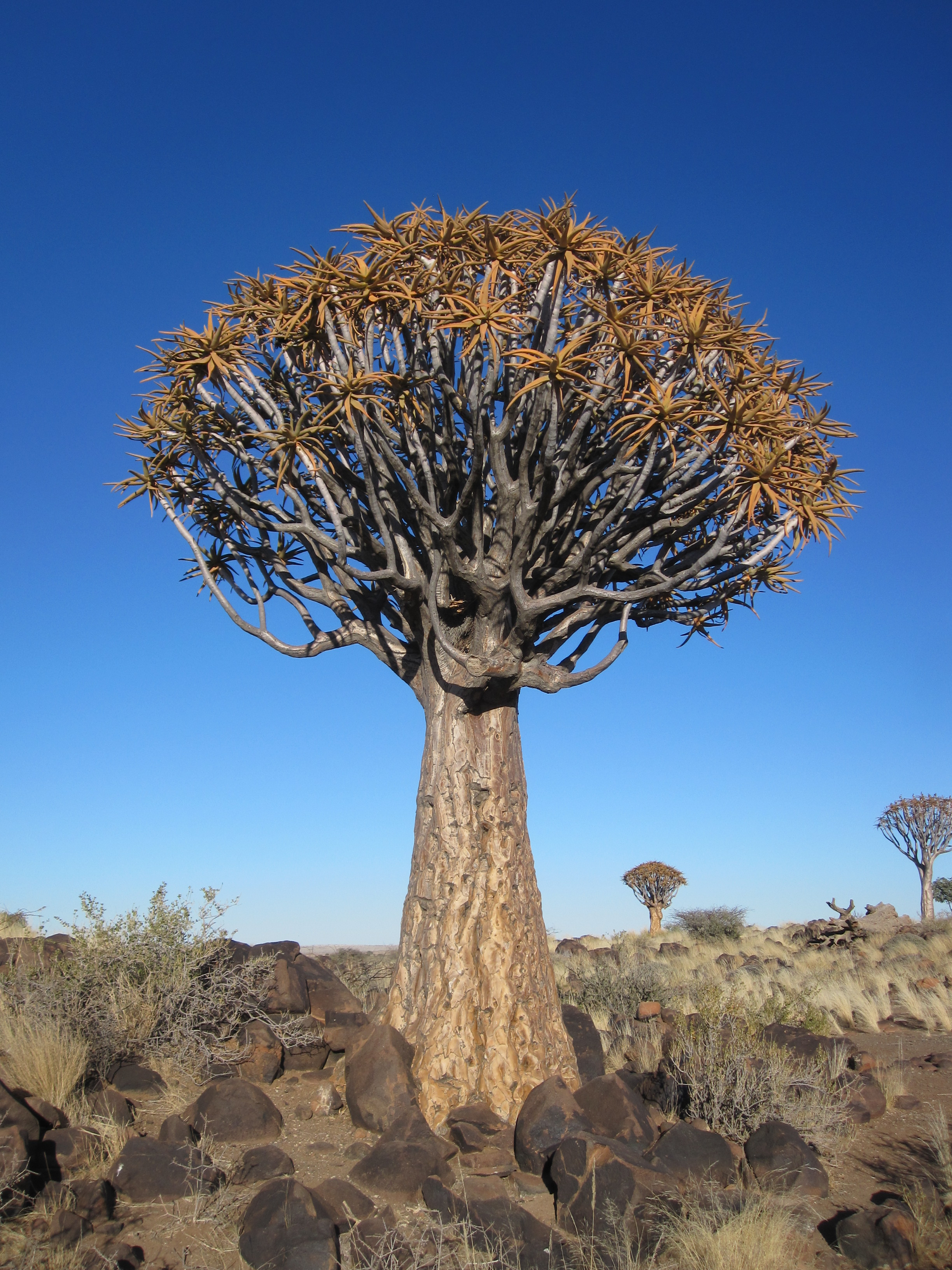
Aloidendron dichotomum

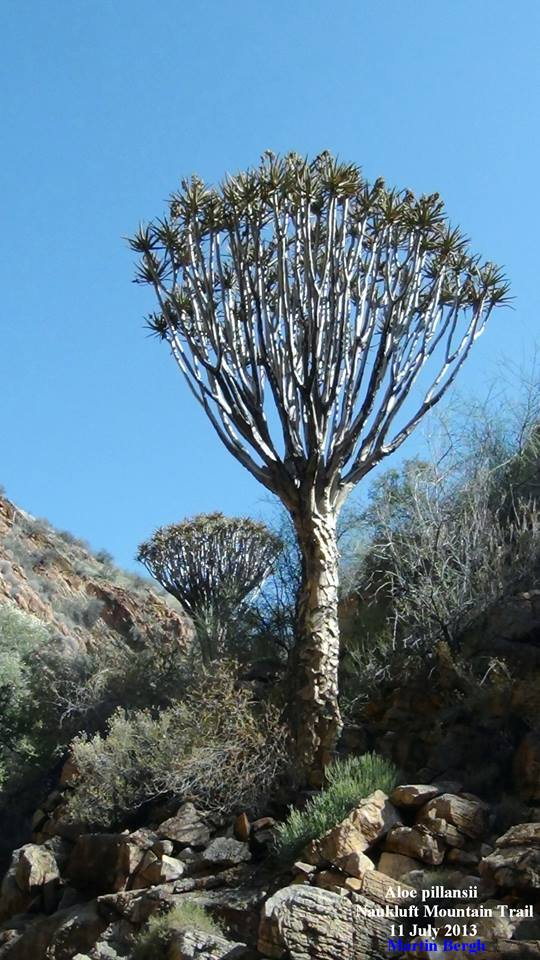
Aloidendron pillansii

- Aloe africana Mill.
- Aloe alooides (H. Bol.) V. Druten
- Aloe angelica Pole-Evans
- Aloe arborescens Mill. (Aloe mutabilis Pillans)
- Aloe cameronii Hemsl.
- Aloe castanea Schonl.
- Aloe comosa Marloth & Berger
- Aloe dolomitica Groenewald
- Aloe excelsa Berger
- Aloe ferox Mill. (Aloe candelabrum Berger)
- Aloe khamiensis Pillans
- Aloe littoralis Bak.
- Aloe marlothii Berger (Aloe spectabilis Reynolds)
- Aloe munchii Christian
- Aloe pearsonii Schönland
- Aloe pluridens Haw.
- Aloe pretoriensis Pole-Evans
- Aloe rupestris Bak.
- Aloe sessiliflora Pole-Evans
- Aloe speciosa Bak.
- Aloe spectabilis Reynolds
- Aloe thraskii Bak.
- Aloidendron barberae (Dyer) Klopper & Gideon F.Sm. (Aloe barberae Dyer, Aloe bainesii Dyer)
- Aloidendron dichotomum (Masson) Klopper & Gideon F.Sm.
- Aloidendron pillansii (L.Guthrie) Klopper & Gideon F.Sm.
- Aloidendron ramosissimum (Pillans) Klopper & Gideon F.Sm.
- Kumara plicatilis (L.) G.D.Rowley

== Asparagaceae ==
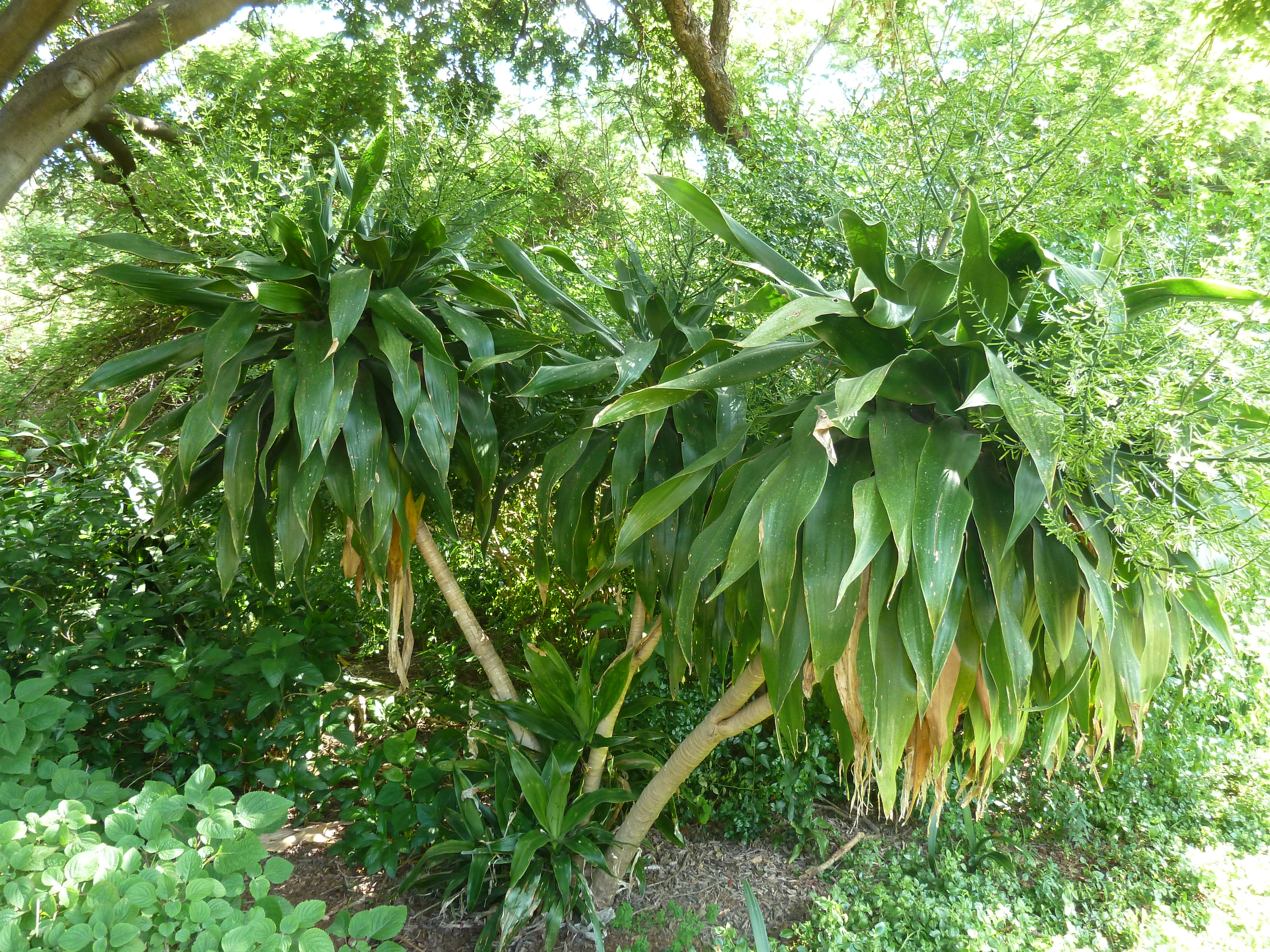
Dracaena aletriformis

- Asparagus falcatus L.
- Asparagus longicladus N.E.Br.
- Dracaena aletriformis (Haw.) Bos (Dracaena hookeriana K. Koch)
- Dracaena camerooniana Baker
- Dracaena laxissima Engl.
- Dracaena mannii Bak. (Dracaena usambarensis Engl., Dracaena reflexa var. nitens (Welw. ex Baker) Baker)
- Dracaena reflexa Lam.
- Dracaena steudneri Engl.
- Dracaena transvaalensis Baker

== Philesiaceae ==
- Behnia reticulata (Thunb.) Didr.

== Smilacaceae ==
- Smilax anceps Willd. (Smilax kraussiana Meisn.)

== Velloziaceae ==
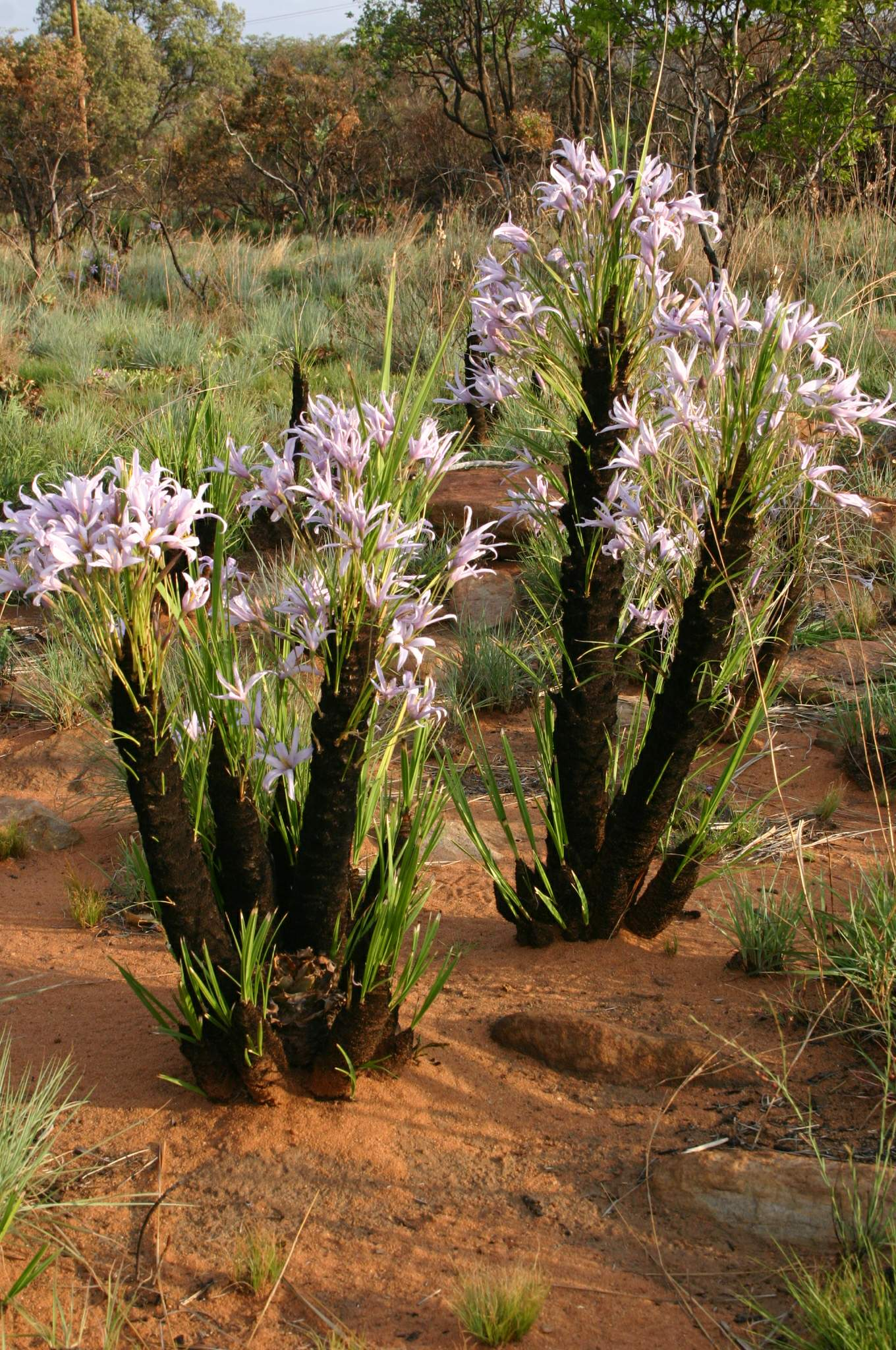
Xerophyta retinervis

- Xerophyta clavata Bak.
- Xerophyta equisetoides Baker
- Xerophyta retinervis Bak. var. equisetoides (Bak.)
- Xerophyta retinervis Bak. var. retinervis
- Xerophyta villosa (Bak.) Dur. & Schinz

== Musaceae ==
- Ensete ventricosum (Welw.) E.E. Cheesm.
- Strelitzia alba (L.f.) Skeels
- Strelitzia caudata R.A. Dyer
- Strelitzia nicolai Regel & Koern.

== Piperaceae ==
- Piper capense L.f.
- Piper guineense Schumach. & Thonn.

== Salicaceae ==
- Salix hirsuta Thunb.
- Salix mucronata Thunb. subsp. capensis (Thunb.) Immelman (Salix capensis Thunb.)
- Salix wilmsii Seemen
- Salix woodii Seemen
- Oncoba bukobensis (Gilg) S. Hul & Breteler (Lindackeria bukobensis Gilg)
- Oncoba spinosa Forsk.
- Scolopia flanaganii (H. Bol.) Sim
- Scolopia mundii (Eckl. & Zeyh.) Warb.
- Scolopia oreophila (Sleumer) Killick
- Scolopia stolzii Gilg
- Scolopia zeyheri (Nees) Harv.
- Pseudoscolopia polyantha Gilg
- Homalium abdessammadii Aschers. & Schweinf.
- Homalium chasei Wild
- Homalium dentatum (Harv.) Warb.
- Homalium rufescens Benth.
- Bivinia jalbertii Tul.
- Trimeria grandifolia (Hochst.) Warb.
- Trimeria trinervis Harv.
- Ludia mauritiana J.F. Gmel.
- Flacourtia indica (Burm.f.) Merr.
- Dovyalis afra (Hook.f. & Harv.) Hook.f.
- Dovyalis hispidula Wild
- Dovyalis longspina (Harv.) Warb.
- Dovyalis lucida Sim
- Dovyalis macrocalyx (Oliv.) Warb.
- Dovyalis rhamnoides (Burch. ex DC.) Harv.
- Dovyalis rotundifolia (Thunb.) Harv.
- Dovyalis xanthocarpa Bullock
- Dovyalis zeyheri (Sond.) Warb.
- Casearia battiscombei R.E.Fr.
- Casearia gladiiformis Mast.

== Myricaceae ==
- Myrica conifera Burm.f.
- Morella brevifolia (E. Mey. ex C. DC.) Killick
- Morella integra (A. Chev.) Killick (Myrica integra (A. Chev.) Killick)
- Morella microbracteata (Weim.) Verdc. & Polhill
- Morella pilulifera (Rendle) Killick (Myrica pilulifera Rendle)
- Morella salicifolia (Hochst. ex A. Rich.) Verdc. & Polhill (Myrica salicifolia Hochst. ex A. Rich.)
- Morella serrata (Lam.) Killick (Myrica serrata Lam.)

== Cannabaceae ==
- Celtis africana Burm.f.
- Celtis gomphophylla Baker (Celtis durandii)
- Celtis mildbraedii Engl.
- Trema orientalis (L.) Blume (Trema guineense (Schumach. & Thonn.) Ficalho)
- Chaetachme aristata Planch.

== Moraceae ==
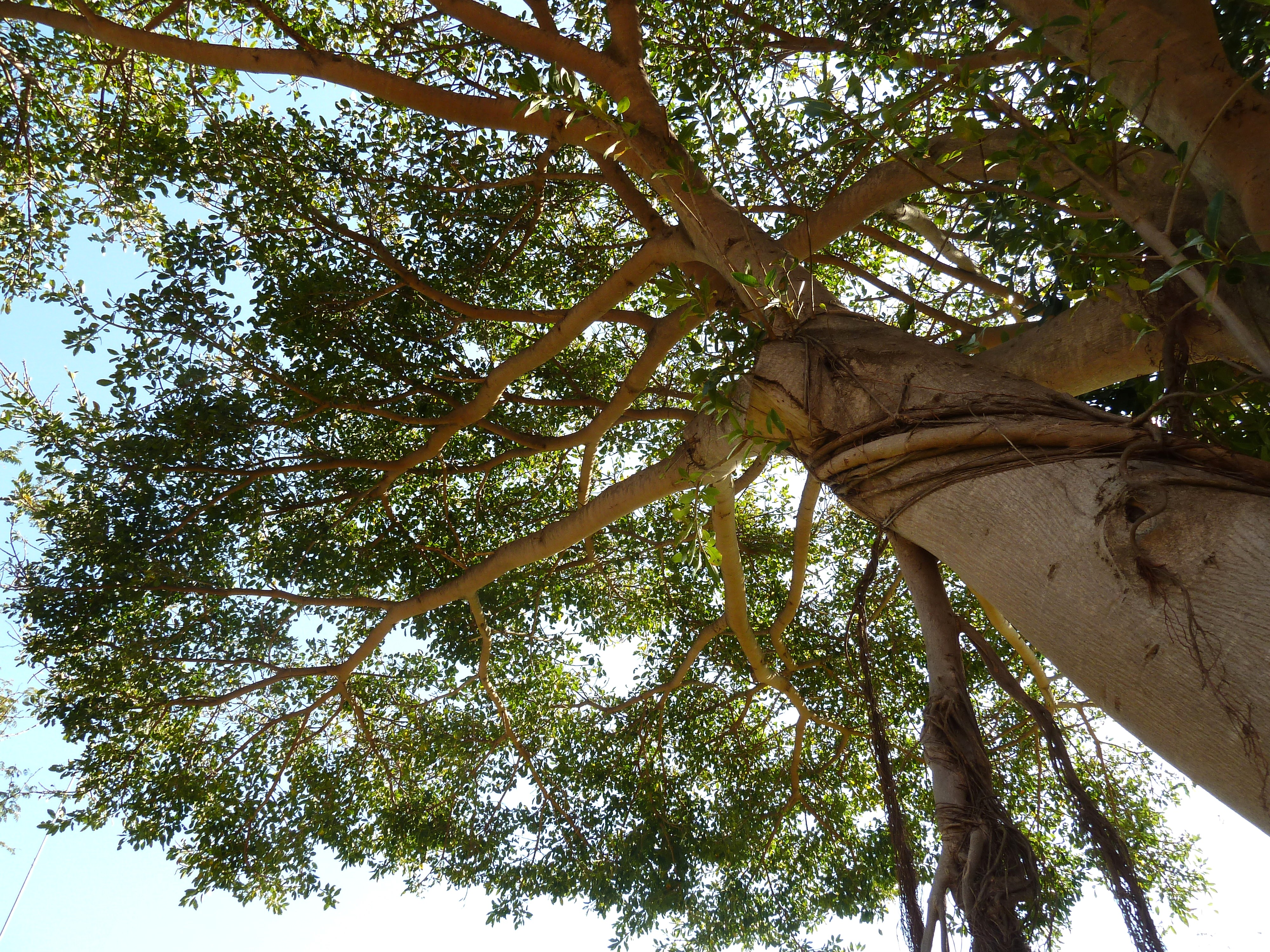
Ficus thonningii

- Treculia africana Decne. ex Trécul
- Morus mesozygia Stapf
- Maclura africana (Bureau) Corner (Cardiogyne africana Bureau)
- Milicia excelsa (Welw.) C.C.Berg (Chlorophora excelsa (Welw.) Benth.)
- Trilepisium madagascariense DC. (Bosquiea phoberos Thouars ex Baill.)
- Ficus abutilifolia (Miq.) Miq. (Ficus soldanella Warb.)
- Ficus asperifolia Miq.
- Ficus barteri Sprague
- Ficus bizanae Hutch. & Burtt Davy
- Ficus brachylepis Welw. ex Hiern
- Ficus bubu Warb.
- Ficus burtt-davyi Hutch.
- Ficus bussei Warb. ex Mildbr. & Burret (Ficus zambesiaca Hutch.)
- Ficus capreifolia Del.
- Ficus cordata Thunb. subsp. salicifolia (Vahl) Berg (Ficus pretoriae Burtt Davy)
- Ficus craterostoma Warb. ex Mildbr. & Burr.
- Ficus cyathistipula Warb.
- Ficus depauperata Sim
- Ficus dicranostyla Mildbr.
- Ficus exasperata Vahl
- Ficus fischeri Warb. ex Mildbr. & Burr. (Ficus kiloneura Hornby)
- Ficus glumosa (Miq.) Del. (Ficus sonderi Miq.)
- Ficus ilicina (Sond.) Miq.
- Ficus ingens (Miq.) Miq.
- Ficus laurifolia Lam. (Ficus brachypoda Hutch.)
- Ficus lutea Vahl (Ficus vogelii (Miq.) Miq., Ficus quibeba Welw. ex Fical., Ficus nekbudu Warb.)
- Ficus natalensis Hochst.
- Ficus nigropunctata Warb. ex Mildbr. & Burret
- Ficus polita Vahl
- Ficus pygmaea Welw. ex Hiern
- Ficus rokko Warb. & Schweinf. (Ficus thonningii pp sensu C.C.Berg)
- Ficus sansibarica Warb.
- Ficus scassellatii Pamp. (Ficus kirkii Hutch.)
- Ficus stuhlmannii Warb.
- Ficus sur Forssk. (Ficus capensis Thunb.)
- Ficus sycomorus L.
- Ficus tettensis Hutch. (Ficus smutsii Verdoorn)
- Ficus thonningii Bl. (Ficus petersii Warb.) (Ficus burkei (Miq.) Miq.) (Ficus rhodesiaca Warb. ex Mildbr. & Burret) (Ficus persicifolia Welw. ex Warb.) (Ficus dekdekena (Miq.) A.Rich.)
- Ficus tremula Warb.
- Ficus trichopoda Bak. (Ficus hippopotami Gerstn.) (Ficus congensis Engl.)
- Ficus vallis-choudae Delile
- Ficus verruculosa Warb.
- Ficus wakefieldii Hutch.

== Urticaceae ==
- Myrianthus arboreus P.Beauv.
- Myrianthus holstii Engl.
- Obetia carruthersiana (Hiern) Rendle
- Obetia tenax (N.E. Br.) Friis (Urera tenax N.E. Br.)
- Pouzolzia mixta Solms (Pouzolzia hypoleuca Wedd.)
- Urera cameroonensis Wedd.
- Urera hypselodendron (Hochst. ex A.Rich.) Wedd.
- Urera trinervis (Hochst apud Krauss) Friis & Immelman

== Proteaceae ==
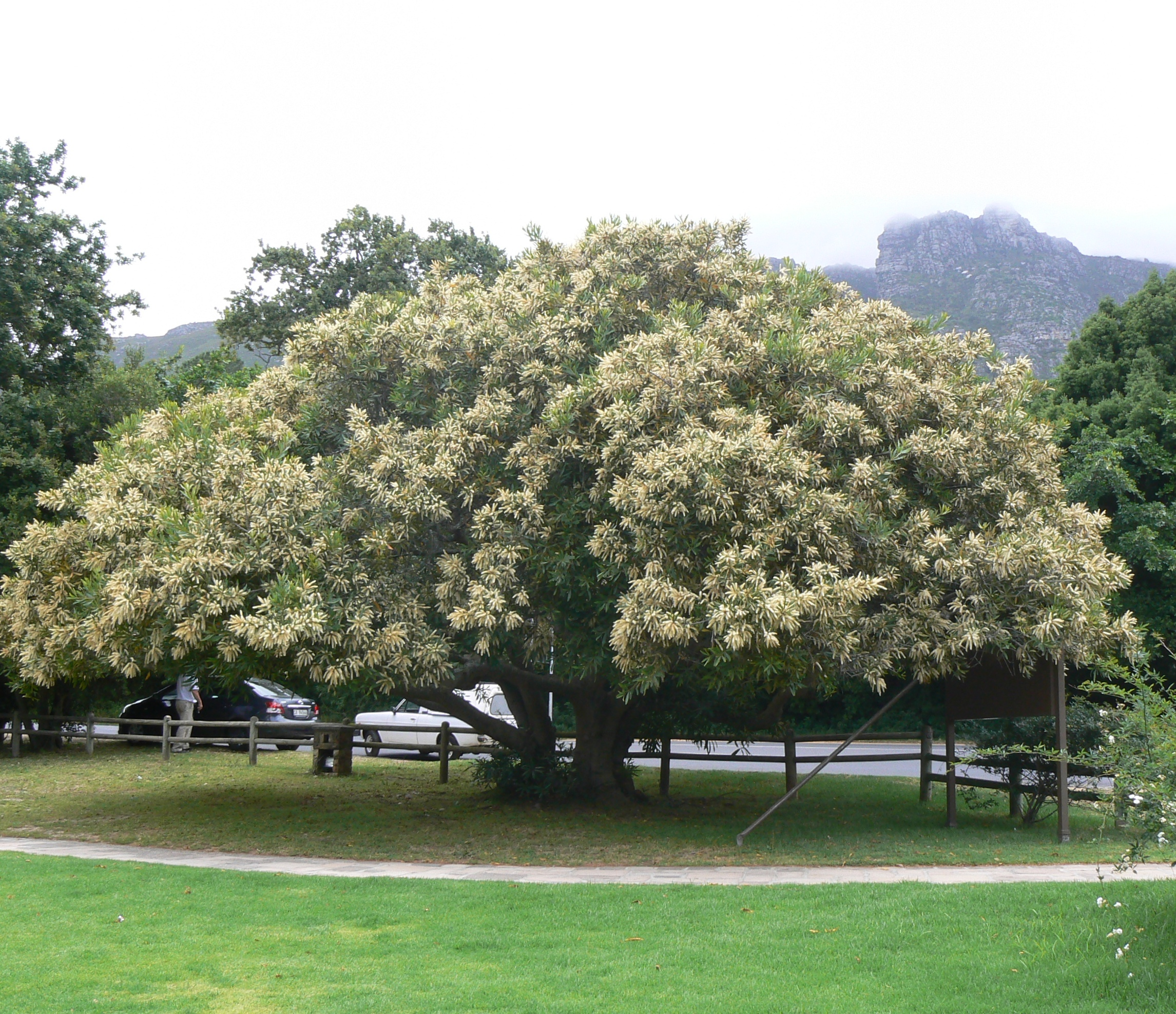
Brabejum stellatifolium

- Brabejum stellatifolium L.
- Mimetes arboreus Rourke
- Mimetes argenteus Salisb. ex Knight
- Mimetes fimbriifolius Salisb. ex Knight
- Faurea forficuliflora Baker
- Faurea galpinii Phill.
- Faurea intermedia Engl. & Gilg
- Faurea macnaughtonii Phill.
- Faurea rochetiana (A.Rich.) Chiov. ex Pic.Serm. (Faurea speciosa (Welw.) Welw.)
- Faurea saligna Harv.
- Protea abyssinica Willd.
- Protea angolensis Welw.
- Protea aurea (Burm. f.) Rourke
- Protea afra Meisn. (Protea rhodantha Hook.f., Protea multibracteata Phill.)
- Protea comptonii Beard
- Protea coronata Lam.
- Protea curvata N.E. Br.
- Protea eximia (Salisb. ex Knight) Fourc.
- Protea gaguedi Gmel.
- Protea gazensis Beard
- Protea glabra Thunb.
- Protea heckmanniana Engl.
- Protea homblei De Wild.
- Protea lacticolor Salisb.
- Protea laetans L.E. Davidson
- Protea lanceolata E. Mey. ex Meisn.
- Protea laurifolia Thunb.
- Protea lepidocarpodendron (L.) L.
- Protea lorifolia (Salisb. ex Knight) Fourc.
- Protea madiensis Oliv.
- Protea magnifica Link
- Protea micans subsp. trichophylla (Engl. & Gilg) Chisumpa & Brummitt (Protea trichophylla Engl. & Gilg)
- Protea mundii Klotzsch
- Protea neriifolia R. Br.
- Protea nitida Mill. (Protea arborea Houtt.)
- Protea obtusifolia De Wild.
- Protea paludosa (Hiern) Engl.
- Protea petiolaris (Hiern) Baker & C.H.Wright
- Protea punctata Meisn.
- Protea repens L.
- Protea roupelliae Meisn.
- Protea rubropilosa Beard
- Protea rupestris R.E.Fr.
- Protea rupicola Mund ex Meisn.
- Protea subvestita N.E. Br.
- Protea susannae Phill.
- Protea welwitschii Engl. (Protea hirta Klotzsch)
- Leucospermum conocarpodendron (L.) Buek
- Leucospermum cuneiforme (Burm.f) Rourke
- Leucospermum gerrardii Stapf.
- Leucospermum patersonii Phill.
- Leucospermum praemorsum (Meisn.) Phill.
- Leucospermum reflexum Buek ex Meissn.
- Leucospermum rodolentum (Salisb. ex Knight) Rourke
- Leucospermum saxosum S. Moore
- Leucadendron argenteum (L.) R. Br.
- Leucadendron conicum (Lam.) I.A. Williams
- Leucadendron coniferum (L.) Meisn.
- Leucadendron discolor Phill. & Hutch.
- Leucadendron ericifolium R. Br.
- Leucadendron eucalyptifolium Buek ex Meisn.
- Leucadendron microcephalum Gand. & Schinz (Leucadendron stokoei Phillips)
- Leucadendron nobile I. Williams
- Leucadendron pondoense Van Wyk
- Leucadendron procerum (Salisb. ex Knight) I. Williams
- Leucadendron pubescens R. Br.
- Leucadendron salicifolium (Salisb.) I. Williams
- Leucadendron strobilinum (L.) Druce

== Santalaceae ==
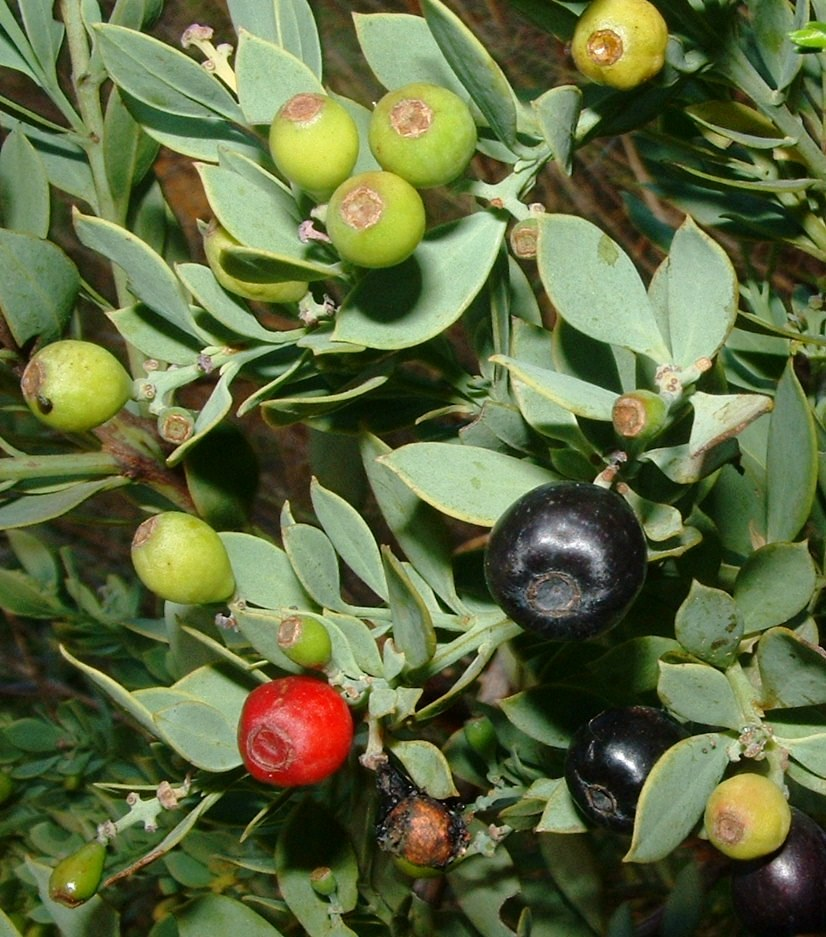
Colpoon compressum

- Colpoon compressum Berg.
- Osyris lanceolata Hochst. & Steud.
- Osyridicarpos schimperanus (Hochst. ex A. Rich.) A.DC.
- Thesium procerum N.E. Br.

== Opiliaceae ==
- Opilia amentacea Roxb. (Opilia celtidifolia (Guill. & Perr.) Endl. ex Walp.)
- Opilia campestris Engl.
- Pentarhopalopilia marquesii (Engl.) Hiepko

== Olacaceae ==
- Olax dissitiflora Oliv.
- Olax gambecola Baill.
- Olax obtusifolia De Wild.
- Ptychopetalum cuspidatum R.E.Fr.
- Ximenia americana L.
- Ximenia americana var. microphylla Welw.
- Ximenia afra Sond.
- Ximenia afra var. natalensis Sond.
- Strombosia scheffleri Engl.

== Polygonaceae ==
- Afrobrunnichia erecta (Asch.) Hutch. & Dalziel

== Aristolochiaceae ==
- Aristolochia albida Duch. (Aristolochia petersiana Klotzsch)
- Aristolochia littoralis Parodi (Aristolochia elegans Mast.)

== Chenopodiaceae ==
- Salsola aphylla L. f.
- Salsola arborea C.A. Sm. ex Aell.
- Salsola etoshensis Botsch.

== Amaranthaceae ==
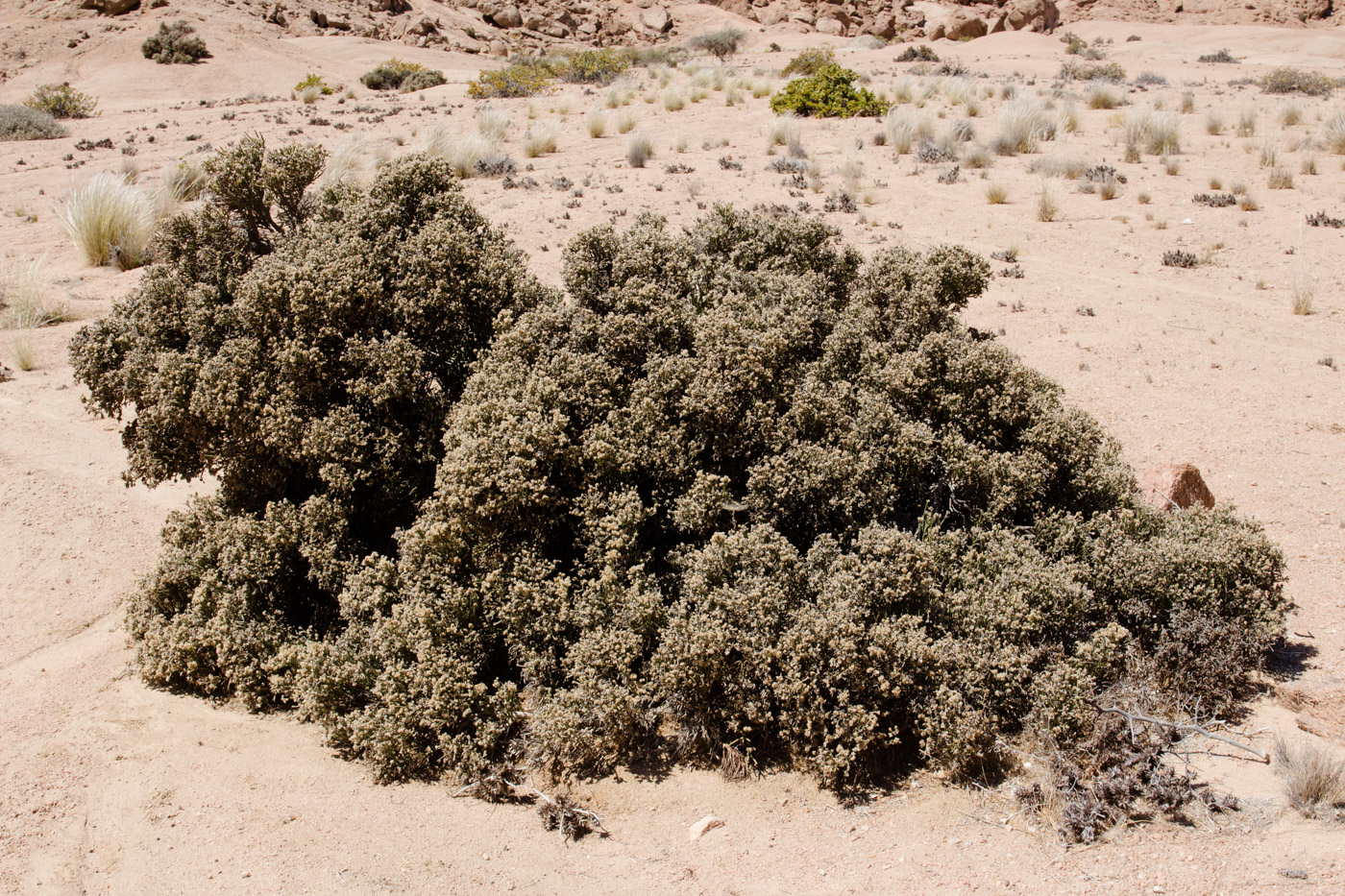
Arthraerua leubnitziae

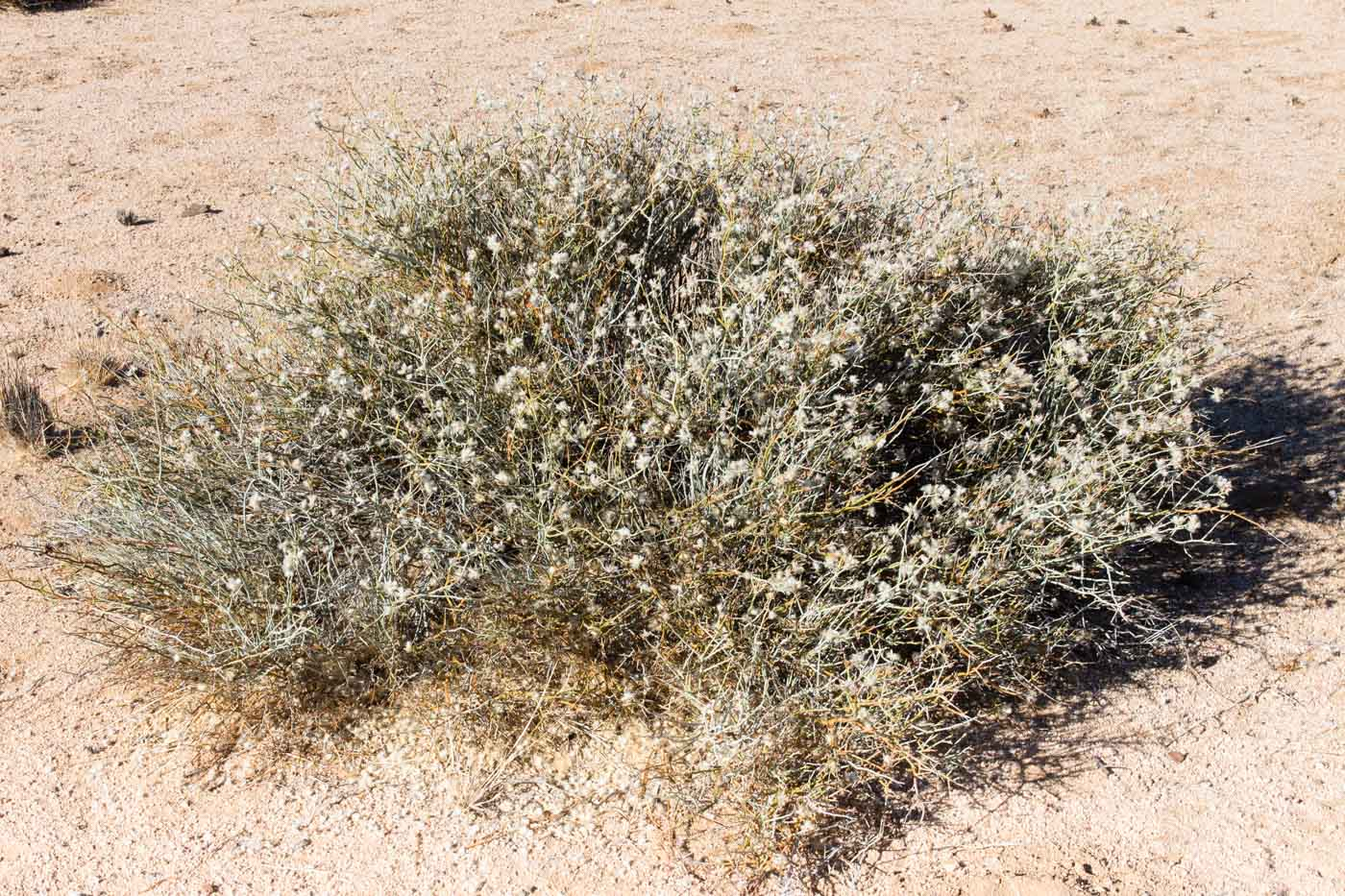
Caliocorema capitata

- Atriplex vestita (Thunb.) Aellen
- Sericorema remotiflora (Hook.f.) Lopr.
- Arthraerua leubnitziae (Kuntze) Schinz
- Calicorema capitata (Moq.) Hook.f.
- Hermbstaedtia glauca Reichb. ex Steud.
- Leucosphaera bainesii (Hook.f.) Gilg
- Suaeda articulata Aellen
- Suaeda plumosa Aellen

== Nyctaginaceae ==
- Phaeoptilum spinosum Radlk.
- Pisonia aculeata L.

== Phytolaccaceae ==
- Phytolacca dodecandra L'Herit.

== Aizoaceae ==
- Stoeberia beetzii (Dinter) Dinter & Schwant
- Tetragonia reduplicata Welw. ex Oliv.
- Tetragonia schenkii Schinz

== Portulacaceae ==
- Portulacaria afra Jacq.
- Portulacaria carrissoana (Exell & Mendonça) Bruyns & Klak (syn. Ceraria carrissoana)
- Portulacaria fruticulosa (H.Pearson & Stephens) Bruyns & Klak (syn. Ceraria fruticulosa)
- Portulacaria longipedunculata (Merxm. & Podlech) Bruyns & Klak (syn. Ceraria longipedunculata)
- Portulacaria namaquensis Sond. (syn. Ceraria namaquensis)

== Ranunculaceae ==
- Clematis brachiata Thunb. (Clematis oweniae Harv.)
- Clematis commutata Kuntze (Clematis iringaensis Engl.)
- Clematis thalictrifolia Engl.
- Clematis welwitschii Hiern ex Kuntze

== Menispermaceae ==
- Cocculus hirsutus (L.) Diels
- Antizoma angustifolia (Burch.) Miers
- Tiliacora funifera (Miers) Oliv.
- Hyalosepalum afrum (Miers) Troupin
- Tinospora fragosa (Verdoorn) Verdoorn & Troupin
- Tinospora tenera Miers

== Annonaceae ==
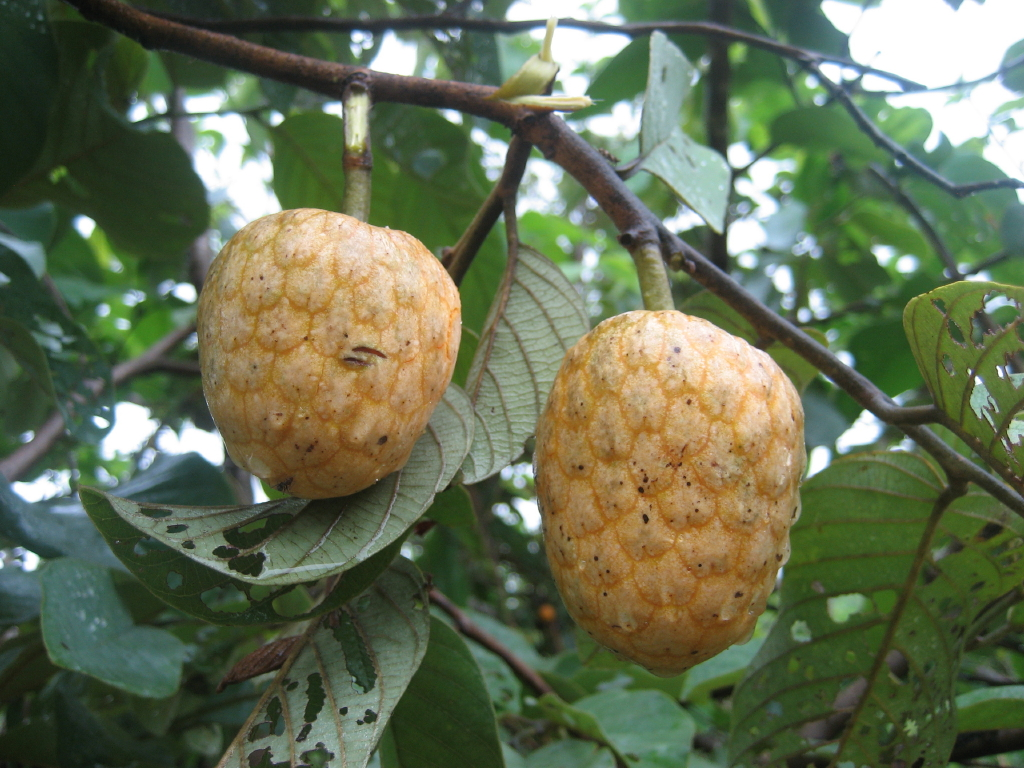
Annona senegalensis

- Annona cherimola Mill.
- Annona senegalensis Pers.
- Annona stenophylla Engl. & Diels
- Artabotrys brachypetalus Benth.
- Artabotrys collinus Hutch.
- Artabotrys monteiroae Oliv. (Artabotrys stolzii Diels)
- Artabotrys parviflora (A. Rich.) Benth.
- Hexalobus monopetalus (A. Rich.) Engl. & Diels
- Monodora junodii Engl. & Diels
- Monodora stenopetala Oliv.
- Monanthotaxis afra (Sond.) Verdc. (Popowia afra)
- Monanthotaxis parvifolia (Oliv.) Verdc. (Popowia oliveriana Exell & Mendonça)
- Monanthotaxis schweinfurthii (Engl. & Diels) Verdc. (Enneastemon schweinfurthii (Engl. & Diels) Robyns & Ghesq.)
- Friesodielsia obovata (Benth.) Verdc. (Popowia obovata Engl. & Diels)
- Sphaerocoryne gracilis (Engl. & Diels) Verdc. (Popowia gracilis Engl. & Diels)
- Uvaria angolensis Welw. ex Oliv.
- Uvaria afra E. Mey ex Sond.
- Uvaria edulis N.Robson
- Uvaria gracilipes N.Robson
- Uvaria lucida Benth. subsp. virens (N.E. Br.) Verdc.
- Uvaria welwitschii (Hiern) Engl. & Diels
- Uvariastrum hexaloboides (R.E. Fr.) R.E. Fr.
- Uvariopsis congensis Robyns & Ghesq.
- Cleistochlamys kirkii (Benth.) Oliv.
- Melodorum gracile (Engl. & Diels) Verdc.
- Xylopia aethiopica (Dunal) A.Rich.
- Xylopia katangensis De Wild.
- Xylopia longipetala De Wild. & T.Durand (Xylopia parviflora (A. Rich.) Benth.)
- Xylopia odoratissima Welw. ex Oliv.
- Xylopia rubescens Oliv.
- Xylopia tomentosa Exell

== Myristicaceae ==
- Pycnanthus angolensis (Welw.) Warb.

== Trimeniaceae (Monimiaceae) ==
- Xymalos monospora (Harv.) Baill.

== Lauraceae ==
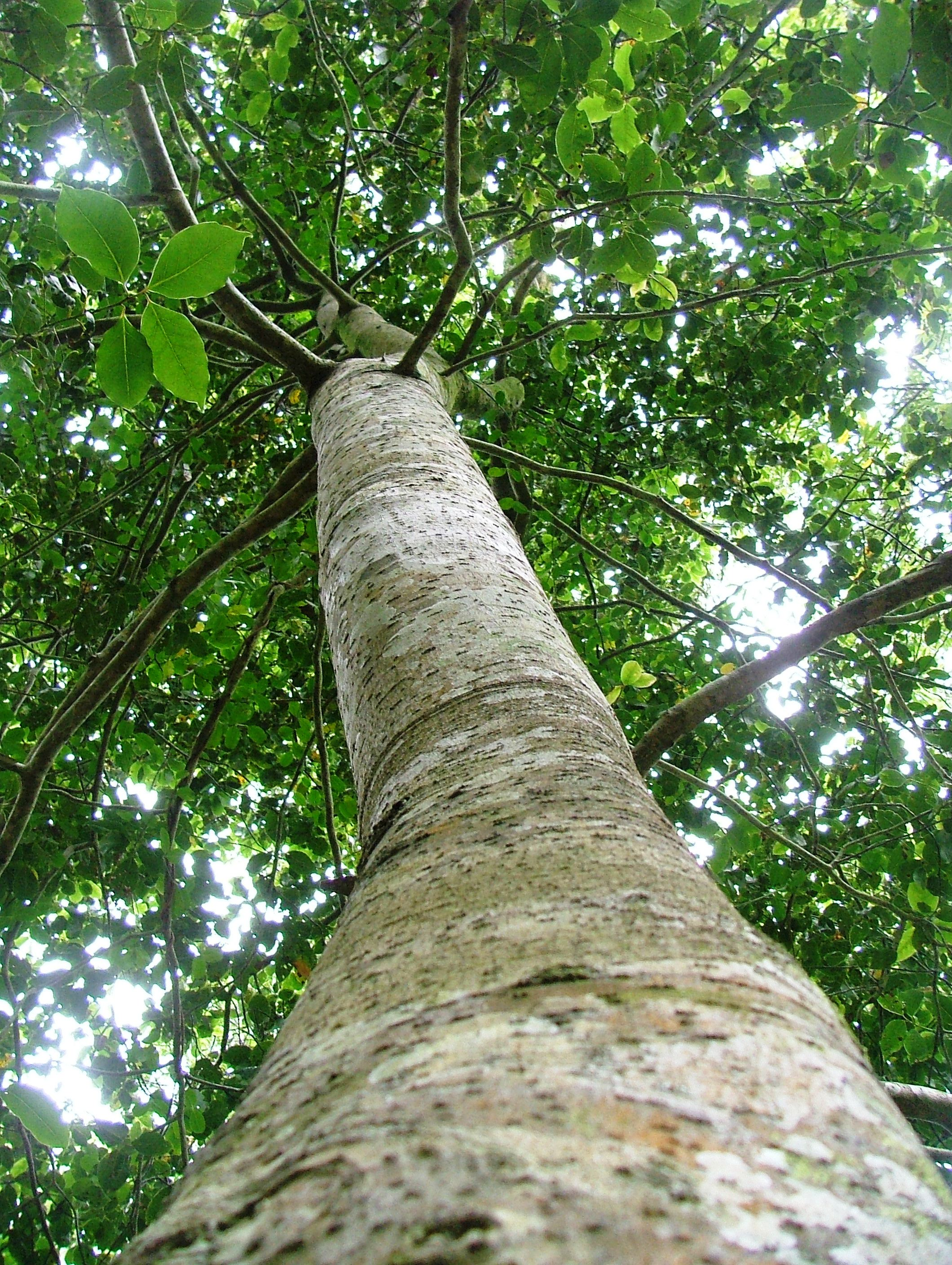
Ocotea bullata

- Cryptocarya angustifolia E. Mey. ex Meisn.
- Cryptocarya latifolia Sond.
- Cryptocarya liebertiana Engl.
- Cryptocarya myrtifolia Stapf
- Cryptocarya natalensis (Ross) Kosterm. (Beilschmiedia natalensis J.H.Ross) (Dahlgrenodendron natalense (J.H. Ross) J. v.d. Merwe & A.E. v. Wyk)
- Cryptocarya transvaalensis Burtt Davy
- Cryptocarya woodii Engl.
- Cryptocarya wyliei Stapf
- Ocotea bullata (Burch.) E. Meyer in Drege
- Ocotea kenyensis (Chiov.) Robyns & Wilczek
- Ocotea usambarensis Engl.

== Hernandiaceae ==
- Gyrocarpus americanus Jacq.

== Capparaceae ==
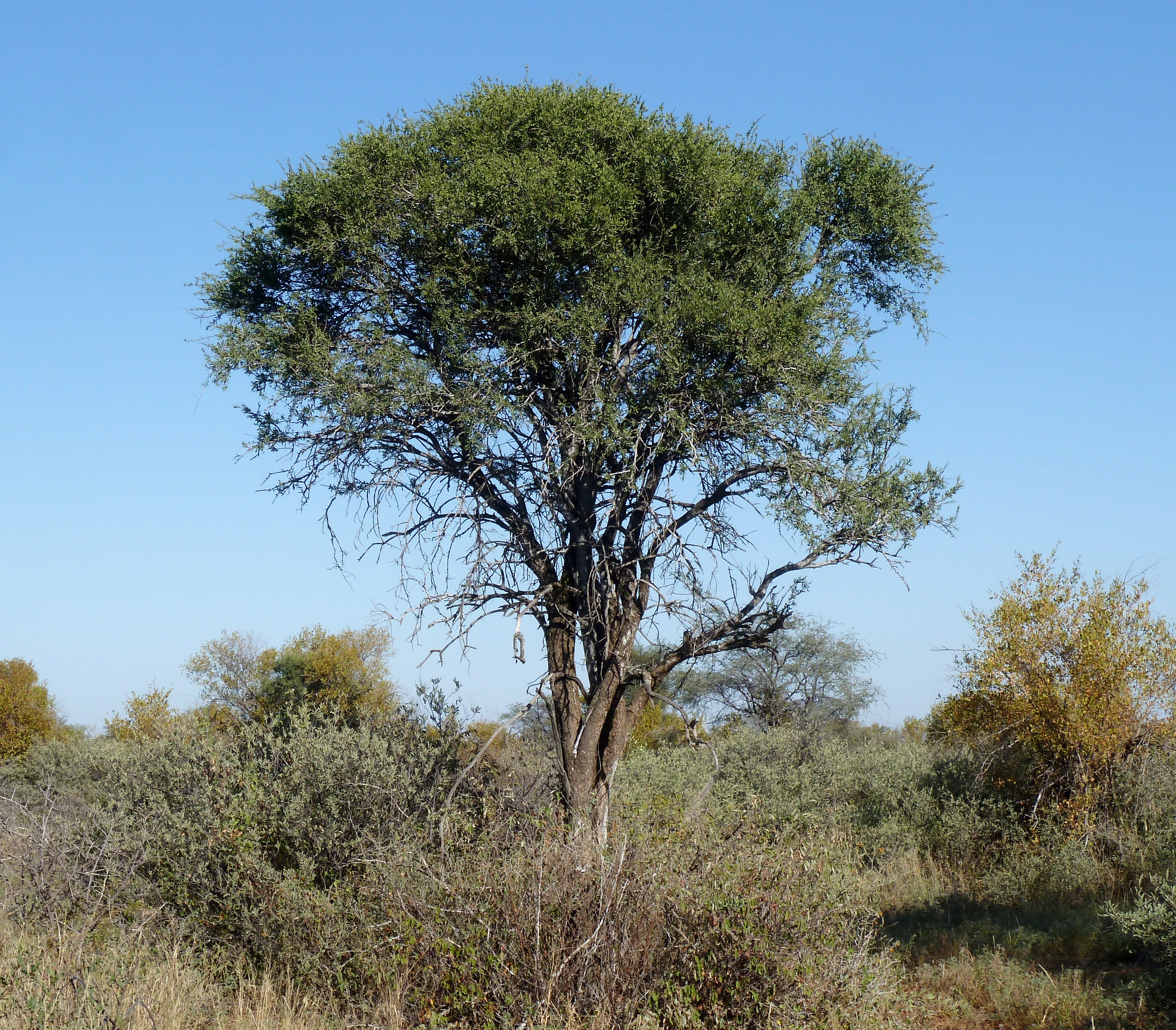
Boscia albitrunca

- Bachmannia woodii (Oliv.) Gilg
- Boscia albitrunca (Burch.) Gilg & Ben. var. albitrunca
- Boscia angustifolia A. Rich. var. corymbosa (Gilg) De Wolf
- Boscia foetida Schinz
- Boscia foetida Schinz subsp. longipedicellata (Gilg) Tölken
- Boscia foetida Schinz subsp. rehmanniana (Pest.) Tölken
- Boscia microphylla Oliv.
- Boscia mossambicensis Klotzsch
- Boscia oleoides (Burch. ex DC.) Tölken (Capparis oleoides)
- Boscia salicifolia Oliv.
- Boscia tomentosa Tölken
- Cadaba aphylla (Thunb.) Wild.
- Cadaba kirkii Oliv.
- Cadaba natalensis Sond.
- Cadaba schroeppelii Suess.
- Cadaba termitaria N.E. Br.
- Capparis erythrocarpos Isert
- Capparis fascicularis DC.
- Capparis fascicularis var. elaeagnoides (Gilg) DeWolf (Capparis elaeagnoides Gilg)
- Capparis fascicularis var. zeyheri (Turcz.) Toelken
- Capparis hereroensis Schinz
- Capparis rosea (Klotzsch) Oliv.
- Capparis sepiaria L. var. citrifolia (Lam.) Tölken
- Capparis sepiaria L. var. subglabra (Oliv.) De Wolf
- Capparis tomentosa Lam.
- Cladostemon kirkii (Oliv.) Pax & Gilg
- Maerua angolensis DC.
- Maerua brevipetiolata Killick
- Maerua bussei R. Wilczek
- Maerua cafra (DC.) Pax
- Maerua cerasicarpa Gilg
- Maerua decumbens (Brongn.) DeWolf (Courbonia glauca Gilg & Benedict)
- Maerua edulis (Gilg. & Ben.) De Wolf
- Maerua endlichii Gilg & Bened.
- Maerua friesii Gilg & Gilg-Ben.
- Maerua gilgii (Schinz)
- Maerua juncea Pax subsp. crustata (Wild) Wild
- Maerua kirkii F. White
- Maerua nervosa (Hochst.) Oliv.
- Maerua parvifolia Pax
- Maerua prittwitzii Gilg & Gilg-Ben.
- Maerua pubescens Müll.Berol.
- Maerua racemulosa (A. DC.) Gilg & Ben.
- Maerua rosmarinoides (Sond.) Gilg & Ben.
- Maerua schinzii Pax
- Thilachium africanum Lour.
- Ritchiea albersii Gilg
- Ritchiea insignis (Pax) Gilg
- Ritchiea gossweileri Exell & Mendonça

== Moringaceae ==
- Moringa ovalifolia Dinter & A.Berger

== Crassulaceae ==
- Cotyledon orbiculata L.
- Tylecodon paniculatus (L.f.) Toelken
- Tylecodon wallichii (Harv.) Toelken
- Crassula arborescens (Mill.) Willd.
- Crassula ovata (Mill.) Druce (Crassula portulacea)
- Crassula sarcocaulis Eckl. & Zeyh. (Crassula parvisepala Schonl.)

== Montiniaceae ==
- Montinia caryophyllacea Thunb.

== Iteaceae ==
- Choristylis rhamnoides Harv.

== Pittosporaceae ==
- Pittosporum viridiflorum Sims

== Cunoniaceae ==
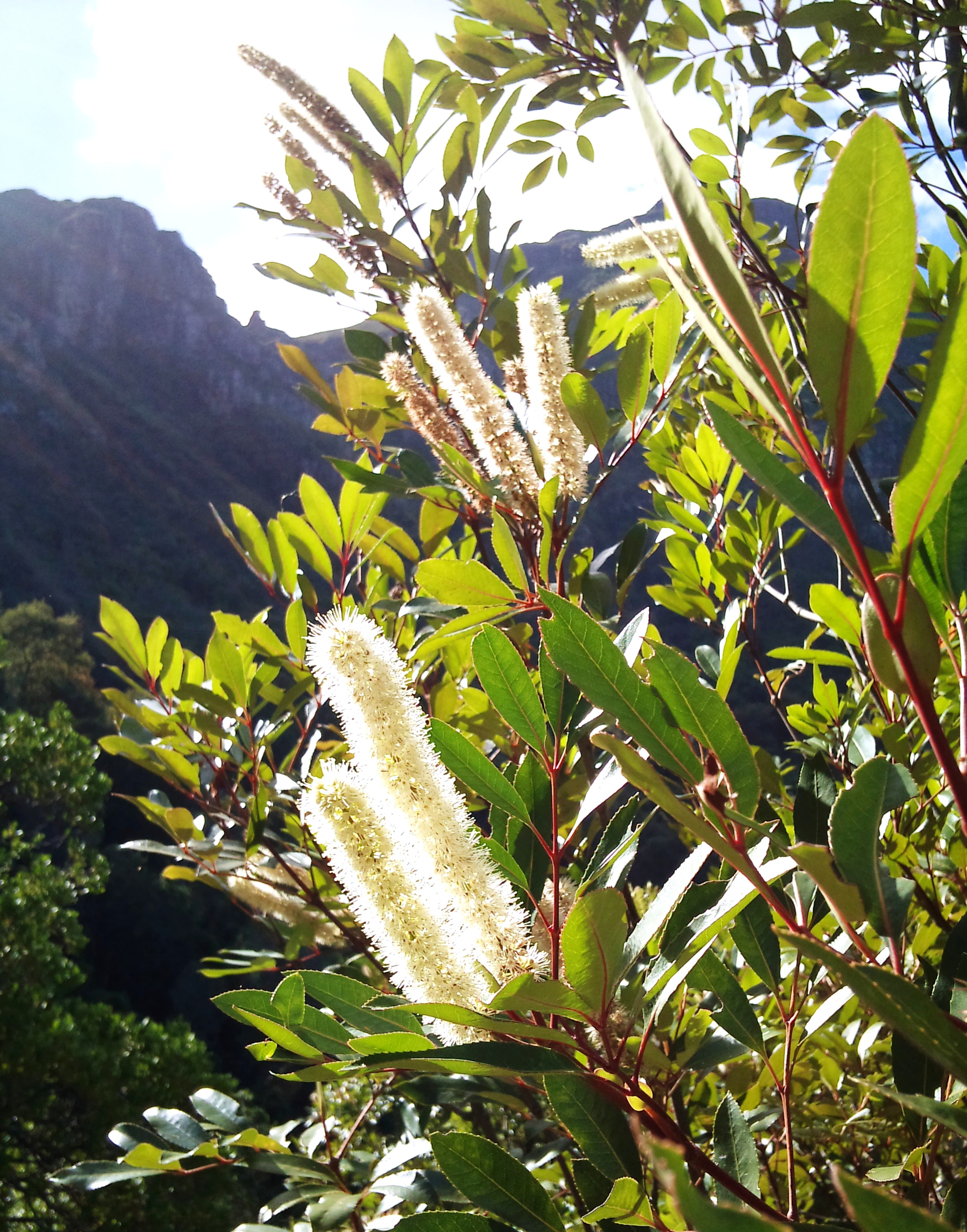
Cunonia capensis

- Cunonia capensis L.
- Platylophus trifoliatus (L. f.) D. Don

== Myrothamnaceae ==
- Myrothamnus flabellifolia Welw.

== Bruniaceae ==
- Berzelia intermedia (D.Dietr.) Schltdl.
- Brunia nodiflora L.
- Raspalia trigyna (Schtr.) Duemmer

== Hamamelidaceae ==
- Trichocladus crinitus (Thunb.) Pers.
- Trichocladus ellipticus Eckl. & Zeyh.
- Trichocladus ellipticus Eckl. & Zeyh. subsp. malosanus (Baker) Verdc.
- Trichocladus grandiflorus Oliv.

== Rosaceae ==
- Hagenia abyssinica (Bruce ex Steud.) J.F.Gmel.
- Leucosidea sericea Eckl. & Zeyh.
- Cliffortia arborea Marloth
- Cliffortia grandifolia Eckl. & Zeyh.
- Cliffortia linearifolia Eckl. & Zeyh.
- Cliffortia nitidula (Engl.) R.E. & Th. Fries
- Cliffortia repens Schltr.
- Cliffortia serpyllifolia Cham. & Schlechtd.
- Cliffortia strobilifera L.
- Prunus africana (Hook. f.) Kalkm.

== Chrysobalanaceae ==
- Parinari capensis Harv.
- Parinari curatellifolia Planch. ex Benth.
- Parinari excelsa Sabine
- Maranthes floribunda (Baker) F.White (Parinari polyandra subsp. floribunda (Baker) R.A.Graham)
- Maranthes goetzeniana (Engl.) Prance
- Magnistipula butayei subsp. bangweolensis (R.E.Fr.) F.White (Hirtella bangweolensis (R.E.Fr.) Greenway)
- Chrysobalanus icaco subsp. atacorensis (A.Chev.) F.White

== Connaraceae ==
- Cnestis polyphylla Lam. (Cnestis natalensis (Hochst.) Planch. & Sond.)
- Rourea minor (Gaertn.) Alston (Santaloides afzelii (R.Br. ex Planch.) G.Schellenb.)
- Rourea orientalis Baill. (Byrsocarpus orientalis (Baill.) Baker)
- Rourea thomsonii (Baker) Jongkind (Jaundea pinnata (P.Beauv.) G.Schellenb.
- Agelaea pentagyna (Lam.) Baill. (Agelaea heterophylla Gilg) (Agelaea ugandensis Schellenb.)
- Burttia prunoides Baker f. & Exell

== Mimosaceae ==
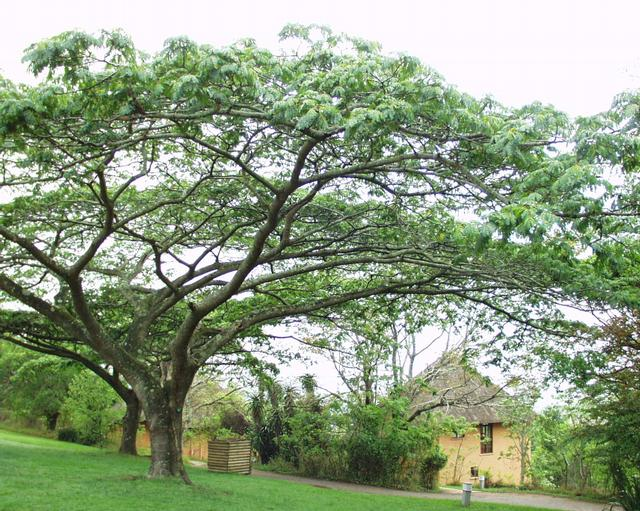
Albizia adianthifolia

- Albizia adianthifolia (Schumach.) W.F. Wight
- Albizia amara (Roxb.) Boiv. subsp. sericocephala (Benth.) Brenan
- Albizia anthelmintica (A. Rich.) Brongn.
- Albizia antunesiana Harms
- Albizia brevifolia Schinz (Albizia rogersii Burtt Davy)
- Albizia forbesii Benth.
- Albizia glaberrima (Schum. & Thonn.) Benth.
- Albizia gummifera (J.F.Gmel.) C.A.Sm. (Albizia fastigiata (E. Mey.) Oliv.)
- Albizia harveyi Fourn.
- Albizia petersiana (Bolle) Oliv.
- Albizia schimperiana Oliv.
- Albizia suluensis Gerstn.
- Albizia tanganyicensis Baker f.
- Albizia versicolor Welw. ex Oliv.
- Albizia zimmermannii Harms
- Faidherbia albida (Del.) A. Chev. (Acacia albida Del.)
- Acacia abyssinica Benth.
- Acacia adenocalyx Brenan & Exell
- Acacia amythethophylla A.Rich. (Acacia macrothyrsa Harms)
- Acacia arenaria Schinz
- Acacia ataxacantha DC.
- Acacia borleae Burtt Davy
- Acacia brevispica var. dregeana (Benth.) Ross & Gordon-Gray
- Acacia buchananii Harms
- Acacia burkei Benth.
- Senegalia afra (Thunb.) Willd.
- Acacia chariessa Milne-Redh.
- Acacia davyi N.E. Br.
- Acacia eriocarpa Brenan
- Acacia erioloba E. Mey. (Acacia giraffae sensu auct.)
- Acacia erubescens Welw. ex Oliv.
- Acacia exuvialis Verdoorn
- Acacia fleckii Schinz
- Acacia galpinii Burtt Davy
- Acacia goetzei Harms subsp. microphylla Brenan
- Acacia grandicornuta Gerstn.
- Acacia haematoxylon Willd.
- Acacia hebeclada DC.
- Acacia hebeclada DC. subsp. tristis A. Schreib.
- Acacia hereroensis Engl.
- Acacia hockii De Wild.

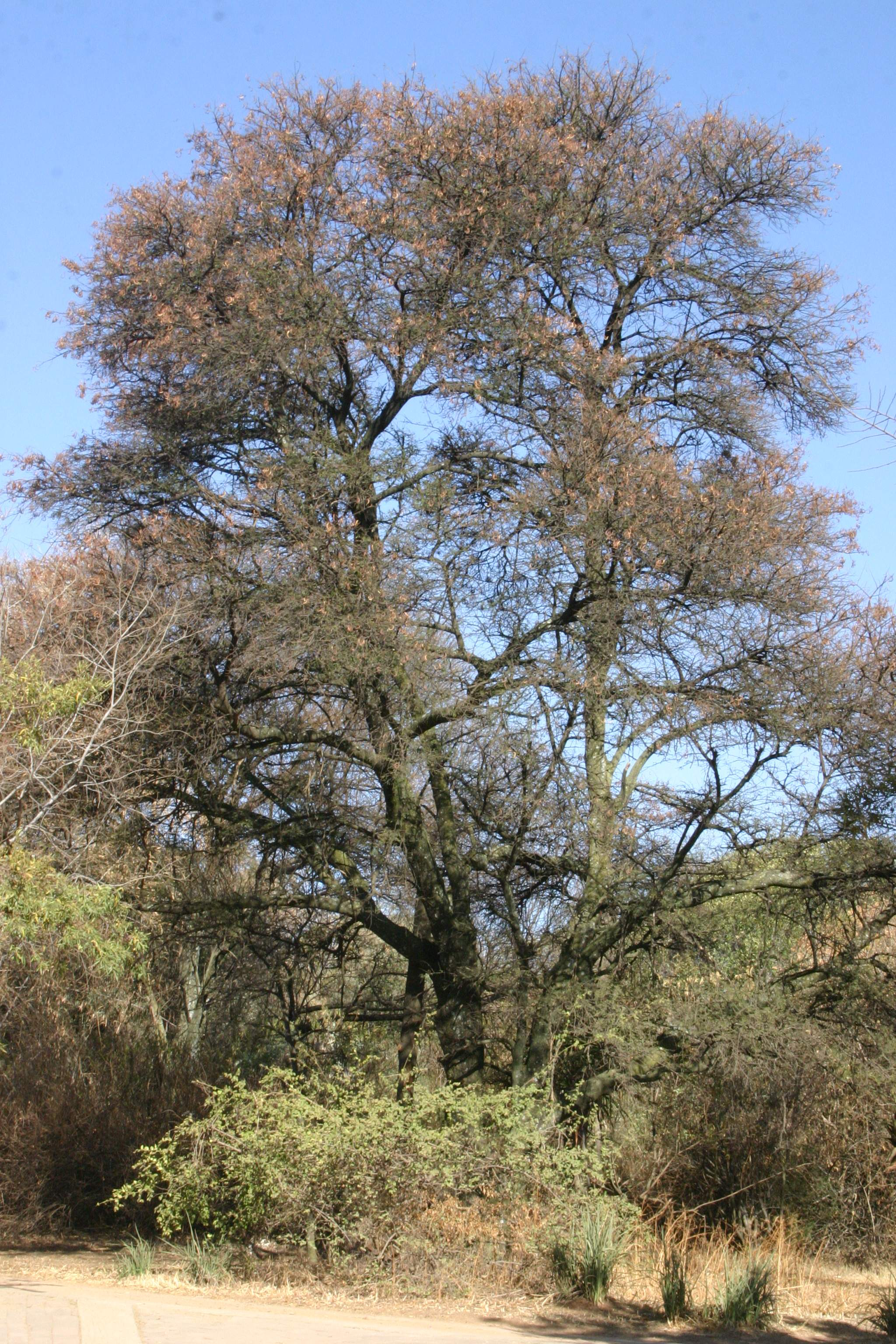
Acacia karroo

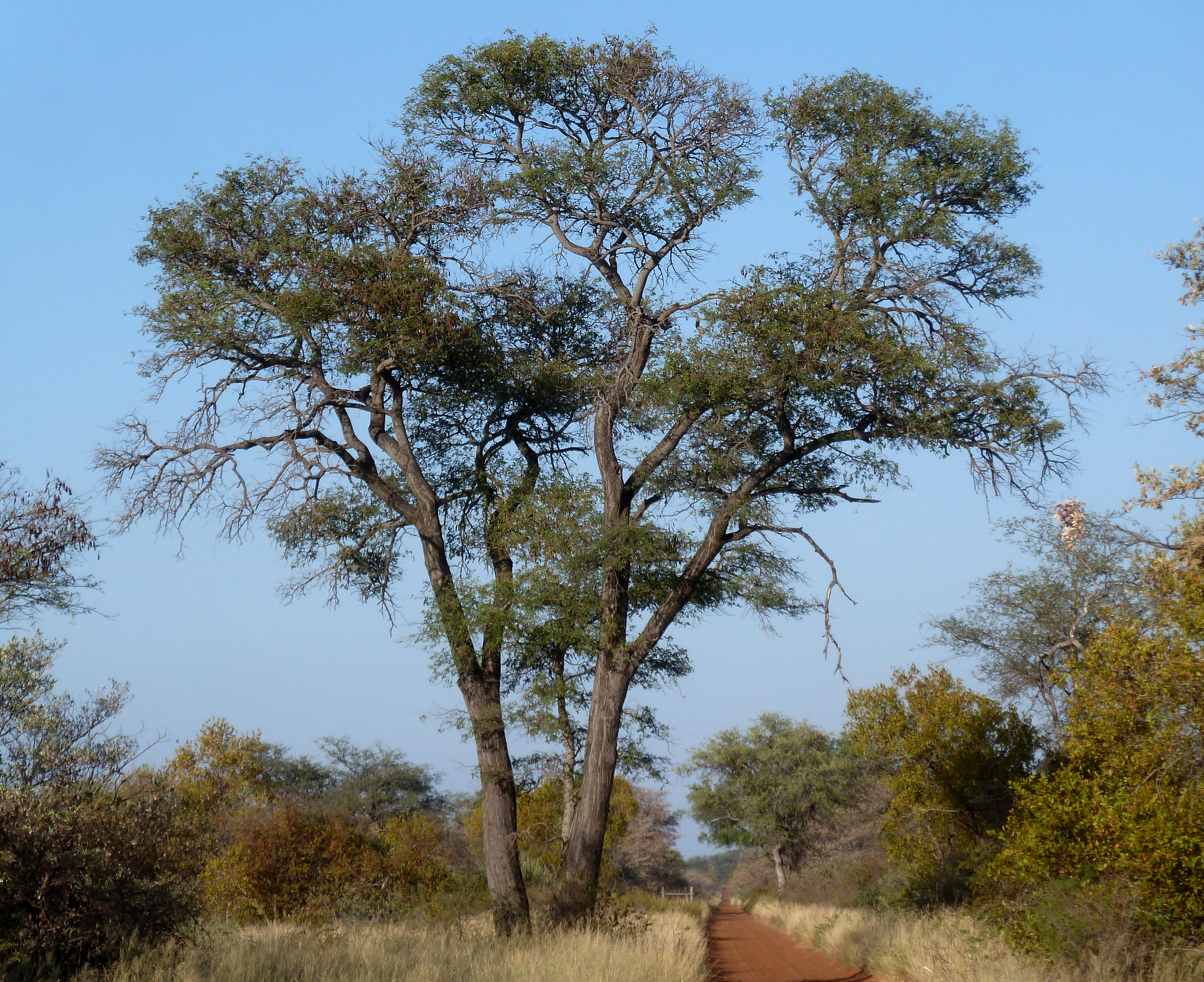
Acacia nigrescens

- Acacia karroo Hayne
- Acacia kirkii Oliv.
- Acacia kraussiana Meisn. ex Benth.
- Acacia luederitzii Engl.
- Acacia mellifera (Vahl) Benth.
- Acacia mellifera (Vahl) Benth. subsp. detinens (Burch.) Brenan
- Acacia montis-usti Merxm. & A. Schreib.
- Acacia nebrownii Burtt Davy
- Acacia nigrescens Oliv. (Acacia passargei Harms)
- Acacia nilotica (L.) Willd. ex Del. subsp. kraussiana (Benth.) Brenan
- Acacia pallens (Benth.) Rolfe
- Acacia pentagona (Schum. & Thonn.) Hook.f.
- Acacia permixta Burtt Davy
- Acacia pilispina Pic.Serm.
- Acacia polyacantha Willd. subsp. campylacantha (Hochst. ex A. Rich.) Brenan
- Acacia reficiens Wawra
- Acacia rehmanniana Schinz
- Acacia robusta Burch. subsp. clavigera (E. Mey.) Brenan
- Acacia robusta Burch.
- Acacia robynsiana Merxm. & A. Schreib.
- Acacia schweinfurthii Brenan & Exell
- Acacia senegal (L.) Willd.
- Acacia seyal Delile
- Acacia sieberiana var. woodii (Burtt Davy) Keay & Brenan
- Acacia stuhlmannii Traub.
- Acacia swazica Burtt Davy
- Acacia tenuispina Verdoorn
- Acacia torrei Brenan
- Acacia tortilis (Forsk.) Hayne subsp. heteracantha (Burch.) Brenan
- Acacia tortilis (Forsk.) Hayne subsp. spirocarpa (Hochst. ex A. Rich.) Brenan
- Acacia welwitschii Oliv. subsp. delagoensis (Harms) J.H. Ross & Brenan

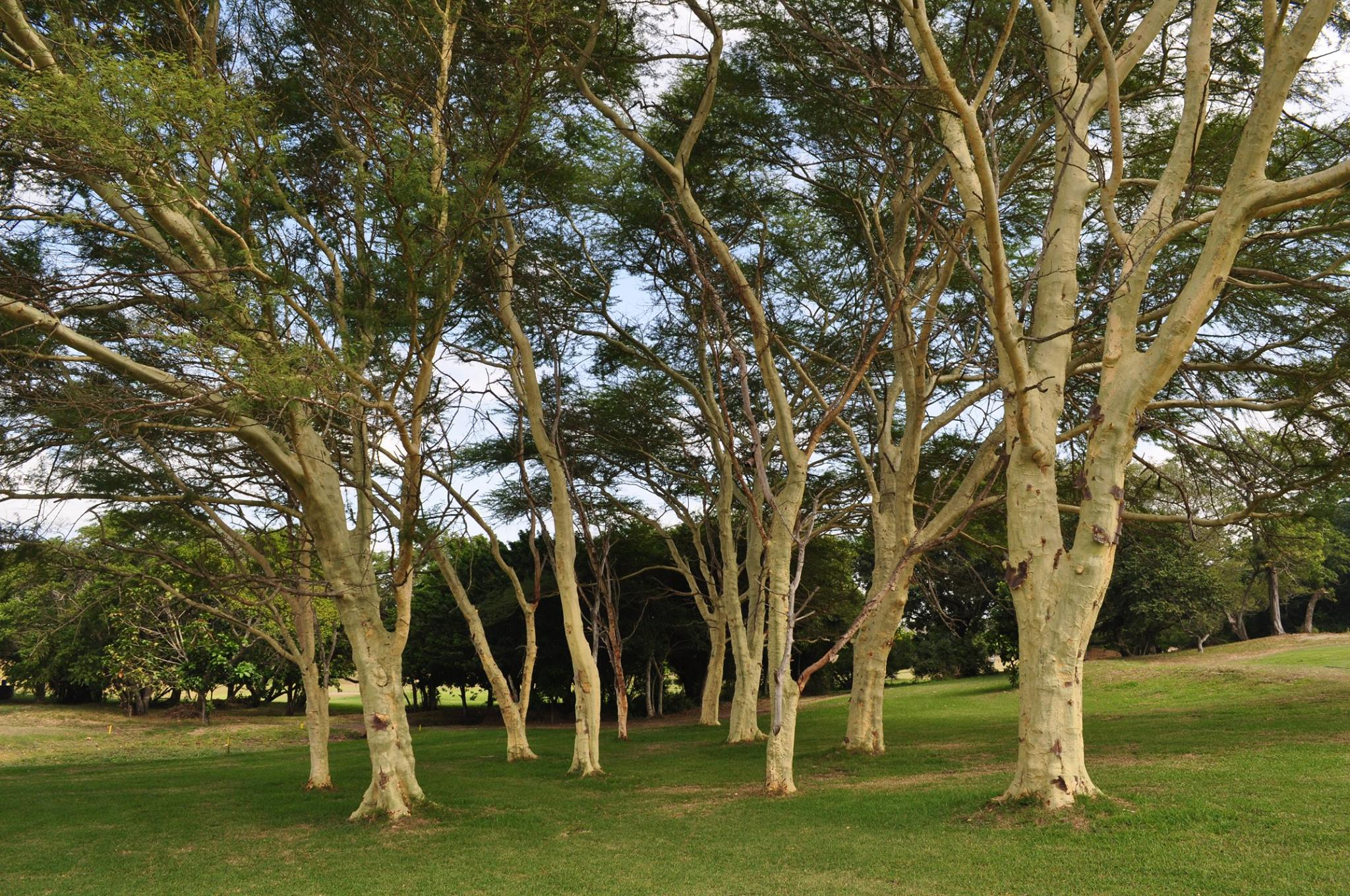
Acacia xanthophloea

- Acacia xanthophloea Benth.
- Dichrostachys cinerea (L.) Wight & Arn. subsp. africana Brenan & Brummitt
- Dichrostachys cinerea (L.) Wight & Arn. subsp. nyassana (Taub.) Brenan
- Amblygonocarpus andongensis (Welw. ex Oliv.) Exell & Torre
- Newtonia buchananii (Baker) G.C.C.Gilbert & Boutiqu
- Newtonia hildebrandtii (Vatke) Torre
- Xylia mendoncae Torre
- Xylia torreana Brenan
- Elephantorrhiza burkei Benth.
- Elephantorrhiza elephantina (Burch.) Skeels
- Elephantorrhiza goetzei (Harms) Harms
- Elephantorrhiza praeterissima J.H. Ross
- Elephantorrhiza rangei Harms
- Elephantorrhiza schinziana Dinter
- Elephantorrhiza suffruticosa Schinz
- Entada abyssinica A.Rich.
- Entada arenaria Schinz
- Entada gigas (L.) Fawc. & Rendle
- Entada rheedei Spreng. (Entada pursaetha)
- Entada wahlbergii Harv.
- Entadopsis abyssinica (Steud. ex A. Rich.) Gilbert & Boutique
- Adenopodia spicata (E. Mey.) Presl. (Entada spicata)
- Leucaena leucocephala (Lam.) de Wit
- Pentaclethra macrophylla Benth.
- Cathormion altissimum Hutch.
- Mimosa pigra L.
- Parkia filicoidea Oliv
- Pseudoprosopis fischeri (Taub.) Harms
- Vachellia gerrardi (Benth.) P.J.H.Hurter

== Caesalpiniaceae ==
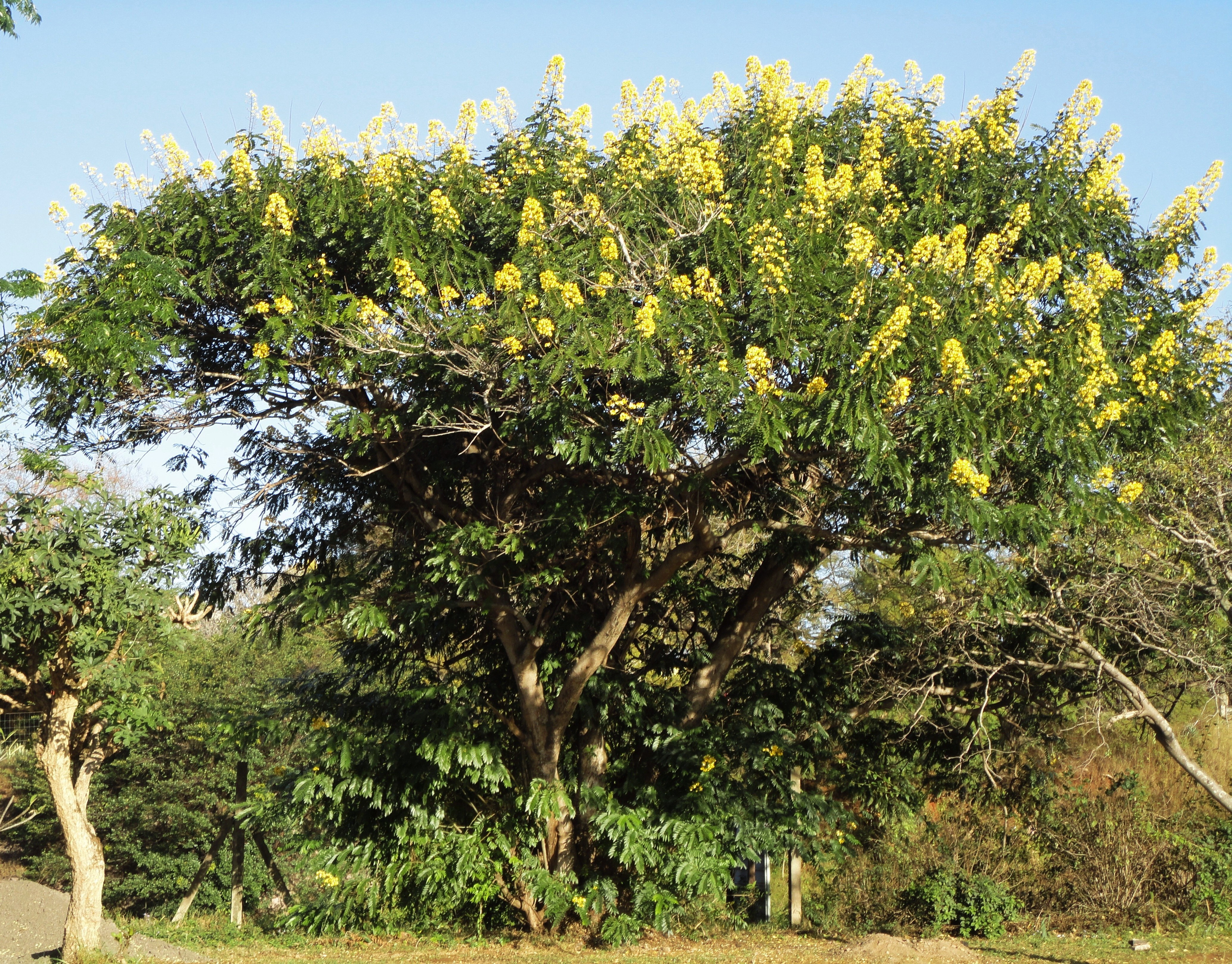
Senna petersiana

- Erythrophleum africanum (Welw. ex Benth.) Harms
- Erythrophleum lasianthum Corbishley
- Erythrophleum suaveolens (Guill. & Perr.) Brenan (Erythrophleum guineense G.Don)
- Burkea africana Hook.
- Colophospermum mopane (Kirk ex Benth.) Kirk ex J. Léonard
- Guibourtia coleosperma (Benth.) J. Léonard
- Guibourtia conjugata (Bolle) J. Léonard
- Hymenaea verrucosa Gaertn.
- Brachystegia allenii Burtt Davy & Hutch.
- Brachystegia bakeriana Burtt Davy & Hutch.
- Brachystegia boehmii Taub.
- Brachystegia bussei Harms
- Brachystegia floribunda Benth.
- Brachystegia glaberrima R.E.Fr.
- Brachystegia gossweileri Burtt Davy & Hutch.
- Brachystegia longifolia Benth.
- Brachystegia manga De Wild.
- Brachystegia microphylla Harms
- Brachystegia puberula Burtt Davy & Hutch.
- Brachystegia russelliae I.M.Johnst.
- Brachystegia spiciformis Benth.
- Brachystegia stipulata De Wild.
- Brachystegia tamarindoides Benth. (Brachystegia glaucescens Burtt Davy & Hutch.)
- Brachystegia taxifolia Harms
- Brachystegia utilis Burtt Davy & Hutch.
- Brachystegia wangermeeana De Wild.
- Schotia afra (L.) Thunb. (Schotia speciosa, Schotia tamarindifolia)
- Schotia afra (L.) Thunb. var. angustifolia (E. Mey.) Harv.
- Schotia brachypetala Sond. (Schotia rogersii, Schotia semireducta)
- Schotia capitata Bolle (Schotia transvaalensis)
- Schotia latifolia Jacq. (Schotia diversifolia, Schotia cuneifolia)
- Umtiza listeriana Sim
- Baikiaea plurijuga Harms
- Tamarindus indica L.
- Afzelia quanzensis Welw.
- Julbernardia globiflora (Benth.) Troupin
- Julbernardia paniculata (Benth.) Troupin
- Adenolobus garipensis (E. Mey.) Torre & Hillc.
- Adenolobus pechuelii (Kuntze) Torre & Hillc.
- Bauhinia bowkeri Harv.
- Bauhinia galpinii N.E. Br.
- Bauhinia mendoncae Torre & Hillc.
- Bauhinia natalensis Oliv.
- Bauhinia petersiana Bolle subsp. macrantha (Oliv.) Brummitt & J.H. Ross (Bauhinia petersiana subsp. serpae (Ficalho & Hiern) Brummitt & J.H. Ross)
- Bauhinia thonningii Schum.
- Bauhinia tomentosa L.
- Bauhinia urbaniana Schinz
- Tylosema esculentum (Burch.) A.Schreib. (Bauhinia bainesii Schinz), (Bauhinia esculenta Burch.)
- Tylosema fassoglensis (Schweinf.) Torre & Hillc. (Bauhinia fassoglensis Schweinf.)
- Piliostigma thonningii (Schumach.) Milne-Redh.
- Dialium angolense Oliv.
- Dialium englerianum Henriq.
- Dialium schlechteri Harms
- Cassia abbreviata Oliv. subsp. beareana (Holmes) Brenan
- Cassia afrofistula Brenan
- Cassia tettensis Bolle
- Senna obtusifolia (L.) H.S.Irwin & Barneby
- Senna occidentalis (L.) Link
- Senna petersiana (Bolle) Lock (Cassia petersiana Bolle)
- Senna singueana (Delile) Lock
- Pterolobium stellatum (Forssk.) Brenan (Pterolobium exosum Bak.f.)
- Caesalpinia angolensis (Oliv.) Herend. & Zarucchi (Mezoneuron angolense Oliv.)
- Caesalpinia bonduc (L.) Roxb. & Bonduc
- Caesalpinia gilliesii (Hook.) D.Dietr.
- Caesalpinia merxmuelleriana A.Schreib.
- Caesalpinia pearsoni L.Bolus
- Caesalpinia rostrata N.E.Br.
- Caesalpinia rubra (Engl.) Brenan
- Parkinsonia aculeata L.
- Parkinsonia africana Sond.
- Bussea massaiensis (Taub.) Harms
- Bussea xylocarpa (Sprague) Sprague & Craib
- Peltophorum africanum Sond.
- Cordyla africana Lour.
- Bobgunnia madagascariensis (Desv.) J.H.Kirkbr. & Wiersema (Swartzia madagascariensis Desv.)
- Haematoxylum dinteri (Harms) Harms
- Isoberlinia angolensis var. niembaensis (De Wild.) Brenan
- Berlinia orientalis Brenan
- Copaifera baumiana Harms
- Cryptosepalum exfoliatum De Wild.
- Cryptosepalum exfoliatum subsp. pseudotaxus (Baker f.) P.A.Duvign. & Brenan
- Cryptosepalum maraviense Oliv.
- Aphanocalyx richardsiae (J.Leonard) Wieringa (Monopetalanthus richardsiae J.Leonard)
- Aphanocalyx trapnellii (J.Leonard) Wieringa (Monopetalanthus trapnellii J.Leonard)
- Tessmannia burttii Harms

== Fabaceae ==
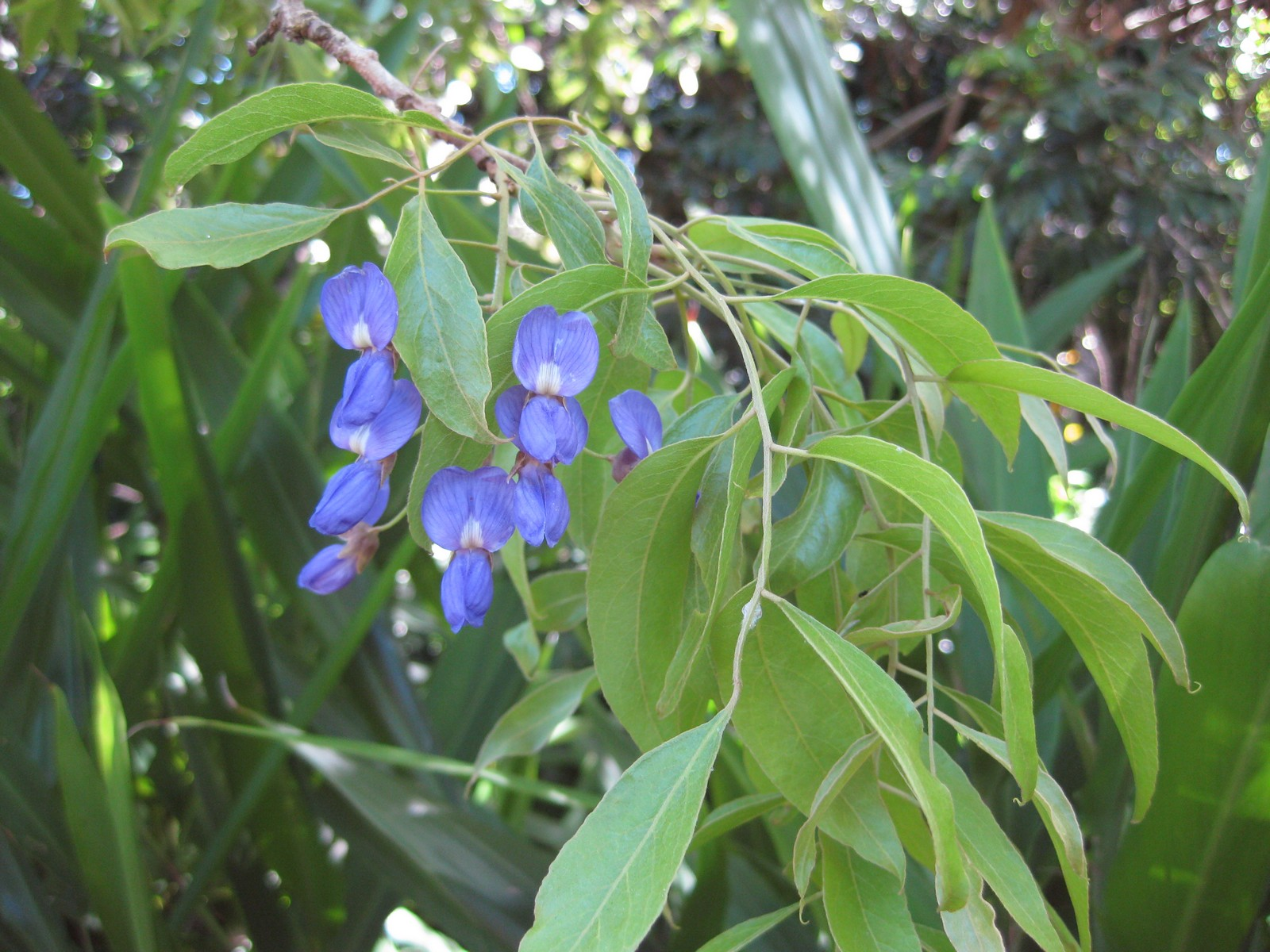
Bolusanthus speciosus

- Abrus precatorius L.
- Abrus schimperi Baker
- Adenocarpus mannii (Hook.f.) Hook.f.
- Pericopsis angolensis (Baker) Meeuwen (Afrormosia angolensis (Baker) De Wild.)
- Sophora inhambanensis Klotzsch
- Calpurnia aurea (Ait.) Benth.
- Calpurnia aurea (Ait.) Benth. subsp. sylvatica (Burch.) Brummitt
- Calpurnia glabrata Brummitt
- Calpurnia robinioides (DC.) E. Mey.
- Calpurnia sericea Harv. (Calpurnia intrusa)
- Virgilia divaricata Adamson
- Virgilia oroboides (Berg.) Salter
- Bolusanthus speciosus (H. Bol.) Harms
- Baphia angolensis Baker
- Baphia bequaertii De Wild.
- Baphia capparidifolia subsp. bangweolensis (R.E.Fr.) Brummitt
- Baphia massaiensis Taub. subsp. obovata (Schinz.) Brummitt
- Baphia racemosa (Hochst.) Bak.
- Crotalaria capensis Jacq.
- Podalyria calyptrata Willd.
- Lebeckia linearifolia E.Mey.
- Lebeckia multiflora E.Mey.
- Lebeckia obovata Schinz
- Lebeckia spinescens Harv.
- Wiborgia sericea Thunb.
- Wiborgia mucronata (L.f.) Druce
- Aspalathus bidouwensis R.Dahlgren
- Indigofera adenocarpa E.Mey.
- Indigofera arrecta A.Rich.
- Indigofera atriceps Hook.f.
- Indigofera garckeana Vatke
- Indigofera glaucifolia Cronquist
- Indigofera homblei Baker f. & Martin
- Indigofera jucunda Schrire (Indigofera frutescens L.f.) (Indigofera cylindrica DC.)
- Indigofera lupatana Baker f.
- Indigofera lyallii Bak.
- Indigofera macrocalyx Guill. & Perr.
- Indigofera melanadenia Harv.
- Indigofera natalensis H. Bol.
- Indigofera nudicaulis E.Mey.
- Indigofera podocarpa Baker f. & Martin
- Indigofera ormocarpoides Baker
- Indigofera rautanenii Baker f.
- Indigofera rhynchocarpa Baker
- Indigofera schimperi Jaub. & Spach
- Indigofera subcorymbosa Baker
- Indigofera sutherlandoides Baker
- Indigofera swaziensis Bolus
- Psoralea aphylla L.
- Psoralea pinnata L.
- Otholobium foliosum (Oliv.) C.H.Stirt. (Psoralea foliosa Oliv.)
- Mundulea sericea (Willd.) A. Chev.
- Tephrosia aequilata Baker
- Tephrosia oxygona Baker
- Tephrosia pondoensis (Codd) Schrire (Mundulea pondoensis)
- Tephrosia praecana Brummitt
- Tephrosia vogelii Hook.f.
- Millettia grandis (E. Mey.) Skeels
- Millettia mossambicensis J.B.Gillett
- Millettia stuhlmannii Taub.
- Millettia sutherlandii Harv. (Philenoptera sutherlandii (Harv.) Schrire)
- Millettia usaramensis Taub.
- Craibia brevicaudata (Vatke) Dunn
- Craibia zimmermannii (Harms) Dunn
- Sesbania cinerascens Welw. ex Bak. (Sesbania kapangensis Cronquist)
- Sesbania coerulescens Harms
- Sesbania goetzei Harms
- Sesbania macrantha E.Phillips & Hutch.
- Sesbania microphylla E.Phillips & Hutch.
- Sesbania sesban (L.) Merr.
- Sesbania tetraptera subsp. rogersii (E.Phillips & Hutch.) G.P.Lewis (Sesbania rogersii E.Phillips & Hutch.)
- Ormocarpum kirkii S. Moore
- Ormocarpum trichocarpum (Taub.) Engl.
- Solulus bibracteatus (Steud. ex A. Rich.) Kuntze (Ormocarpum bibracteatum (Steud. ex A. Rich.) Baker)
- Aeschynomene megalophylla Harms
- Aeschynomene nodulosa (Bak.) Bak.f.
- Kotschya aeschynomenoides (Baker) Dewit & P.A.Duvign.
- Kotschya africana Endl.
- Kotschya parvifolia (Burtt Davy) Verd.
- Kotschya recurvifolia (Taub.) F.White
- Kotschya strobilantha (Baker) Dewit & P.A.Duvign.
- Kotschya thymodora (Bak.f.) Wild
- Leptoderris goetzei (Harms) Dunn
- Leptoderris nobilis (Baker) Dunn
- Dalbergia arbutifolia Baker
- Dalbergia armata E. Mey.
- Dalbergia boehmii Taub.
- Dalbergia fischeri Taub.
- Dalbergia martinii F.White
- Dalbergia melanoxylon Guill. & Perr.
- Dalbergia multijuga E. Mey.
- Dalbergia nitidula Welw ex Bak.
- Dalbergia obovata E. Mey.
- Dalbergiella nyassae Baker f.
- Philenoptera bussei (Harms) Schrire
- Philenoptera nelsii (Schinz) Schrire
- Philenoptera violacea (Klotzsch) Schrire (Lonchocarpus capassa Rolfe p.p.)
- Pterocarpus angolensis DC.
- Pterocarpus antunesii (Taub.) Harms
- Pterocarpus brenanii Barbosa & Torre
- Pterocarpus lucens Guill. & Perr. subsp. antunesii (Taub.) Rojo
- Pterocarpus rotundifolius (Sond.) Druce (Pterocarpus sericeus Benth.)
- Pterocarpus tinctorius Welw. (Pterocarpus chrysothrix Taub.)
- Lonchocarpus bussei Harms (Lonchocarpus menyhartii Schinz)
- Lonchocarpus eriocalyx Harms
- Lonchocarpus katangensis De Wild.
- Lonchocarpus nelsii (Schinz) Heering & Grimme
- Lonchocarpus sutherlandii (Harv.) Dunn (Millettia sutherlandii Harv.)
- Mucuna gigantea (Willd.) DC.
- Mucuna poggei Taub.
- Mucuna pruriens (L.) DC.
- Mucuna stans Baker
- Xeroderris stuhlmannii (Taub.) Mendonça & E.P. Sousa (Ostryoderris stuhlmannii (Taub.) Dunn ex Harms)
- Xanthocercis zambesiaca (Bak.) Dumaz-le-Grand (Pseudocadia zambesiaca (Baker) Harms)
- Erythrina abyssinica Lam.
- Erythrina baumii Harms
- Erythrina afra Thunb.
- Erythrina decora Harms
- Erythrina excelsa Baker
- Erythrina humeana Spreng.
- Erythrina latissima E. Mey.
- Erythrina livingstoniana Baker
- Erythrina lysistemon Hutch.
- Erythrina mendesii Torre
- Erythrina zeyheri Harv. - geoxyle
- Otoptera burchellii DC.
- Rhynchosia caribaea (Jacq.) DC.
- Rhynchosia clivorum S. Moore
- Rhynchosia hirta (Andrews) Meikle & Verdc. (Rhynchosia albiflora (Sims) Alston)
- Rhynchosia procurrens subsp. floribunda (Baker) Verdc. (Rhynchosia floribunda Baker)
- Dipogon lignosus (L.) Verdc.

== Geraniaceae ==
- Sarcocaulon marlothii Engl.
- Pelargonium otaviense R. Knuth
- Monsonia marlothii (Engl.) F.Albers

== Linaceae ==
- Hugonia busseana Engl.
- Hugonia orientalis Engl.

== Ixonanthaceae ==
- Phyllocosmus lemaireanus (De Wild. & T.Durand) T.Durand & H.Durand (Ochthocosmus lemaireanus De Wild. & T.Durand)

== Erythroxylaceae ==
- Nectaropetalum capense (H. Bol.) Stapf & Boodle (Peglera capensis, Erythroxylum capense)
- Nectaropetalum zuluense (Schonl.) Corbishley
- Erythroxylum delagoense Schinz.
- Erythroxylum emarginatum Thonn.
- Erythroxylum pictum E. Mey. ex Sond.
- Erythroxylum zambesiacum N.K.B. Robson

== Zygophyllaceae ==
- Zygophyllum prismatocarpum E. Mey. ex Sond.
- Neoluederitzia sericocarpa Schinz
- Sisyndite spartea E.Mey. ex Sond.

== Balanitaceae ==
- Balanites aegyptiaca (L.) Delile
- Balanites angolensis (Welw.) Mildbr. & Schltr.
- Balanites maughamii Sprague
- Balanites pedicellaris Mildbr. & Schlecht.

== Rutaceae ==
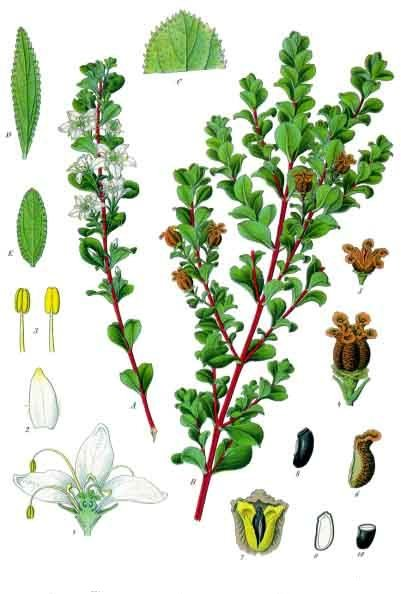
Agathosma betulina

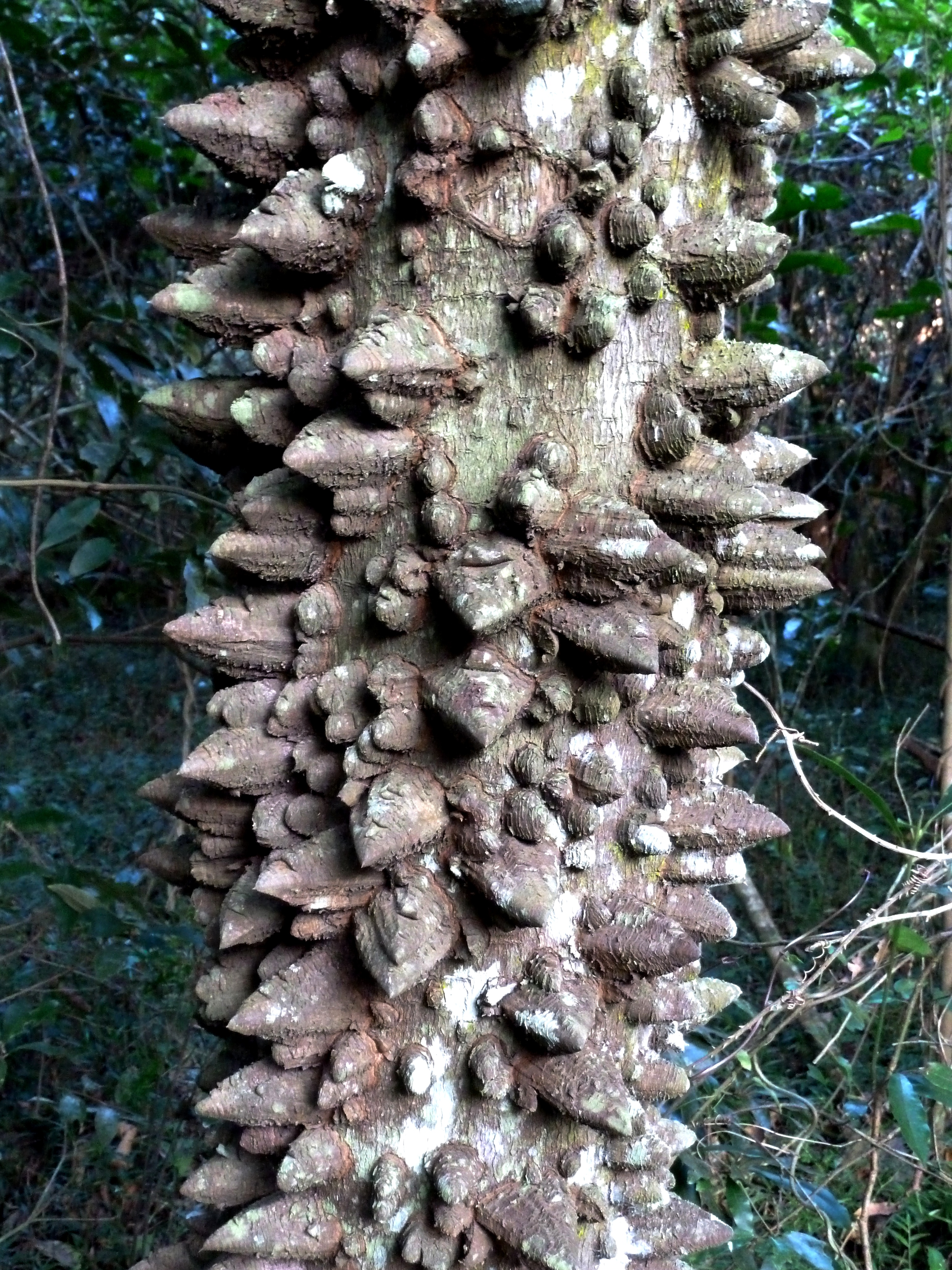
Zanthoxylum davyi

- Agathosma betulina (P.J.Bergius) Pillans
- Agathosma hispida (Thunb.) Bartl. & H.L.Wendl. (Hartogia schinoides C.A.Sm.)
- Ptaeroxylon obliquum (Thunb.) Radlk. (Ptaeroxylon utile Eckl. & Zeyh.)
- Zanthoxylum capense (Thunb.) Harv. (Fagara capensis Thunb., Fagara magalismontana Engl.)
- Zanthoxylum chalybeum Engl.
- Zanthoxylum davyi (Verdoorn) Waterm. (Fagara davyi Verd.)
- Zanthoxylum gilletii (De Wild.) P.G.Waterman (Fagara macrophylla (Oliv.) Engl.)
- Zanthoxylum holtzianum (Engl.) P.G. Waterman (Fagara holtziana Engl.)
- Zanthoxylum humile (E.A. Bruce) Waterm.
- Zanthoxylum leprieurii Guill. & Perr. (Fagara leprieurii (Guill. & Perr.) Engl.)
- Zanthoxylum ovatifoliolatum (Engl.) Finkelstein
- Zanthoxylum thorncroftii Waterm.
- Fagara chalybea (Engl.) Engl.
- Fagara schlechteri Engl.
- Fagara trijuga Dunkley
- Fagaropsis angolensis (Engl.) H.M.Gardner
- Calodendrum capense (L.f.) Thunb.
- Vepris bachmannii (Engl.) Mziray (Oricia bachmannii (Engl.) Verd.)
- Vepris carringtoniana Mendonça
- Vepris lanceolata (Lam.) G. Don (Vepris undulata Verdoorn & C.A. Smith)
- Vepris myrei (Exell & Mendonça) Mziray (Teclea myrei Exell & Mendonça)
- Vepris reflexa Verdoorn
- Vepris trichocarpa (Engl.) Mziray (Teclea trichocarpa (Engl.) Engl.)
- Vepris zambesiaca S. Moore
- Toddalia asiatica (L.) Lam.
- Toddalia glomerata F.Hoffm. (Teclea glomerata Verd.)
- Toddaliopsis bremekampii Verdoorn
- Teclea fischeri (Engl.) Engl.
- Teclea gerrardii Verdoorn
- Teclea natalensis (Sond.) Engl. (Toddalia natalensis Sond.)
- Teclea nobilis Del.
- Teclea pilosa (Engl.) Verdoorn
- Clausena anisata (Willd.) Hook. f. ex Benth. (Clausena inaequalis (DC.) Benth.)
- Citropsis daweana Swingle & Kellerm.

== Irvingiaceae ==
- Klainedoxa gabonensis Pierre

== Simaroubaceae ==
- Harrisonia abyssinica Oliv.
- Kirkia acuminata Oliv.
- Kirkia dewinteri Merxm. & Heine
- Kirkia wilmsii Engl.

== Burseraceae ==
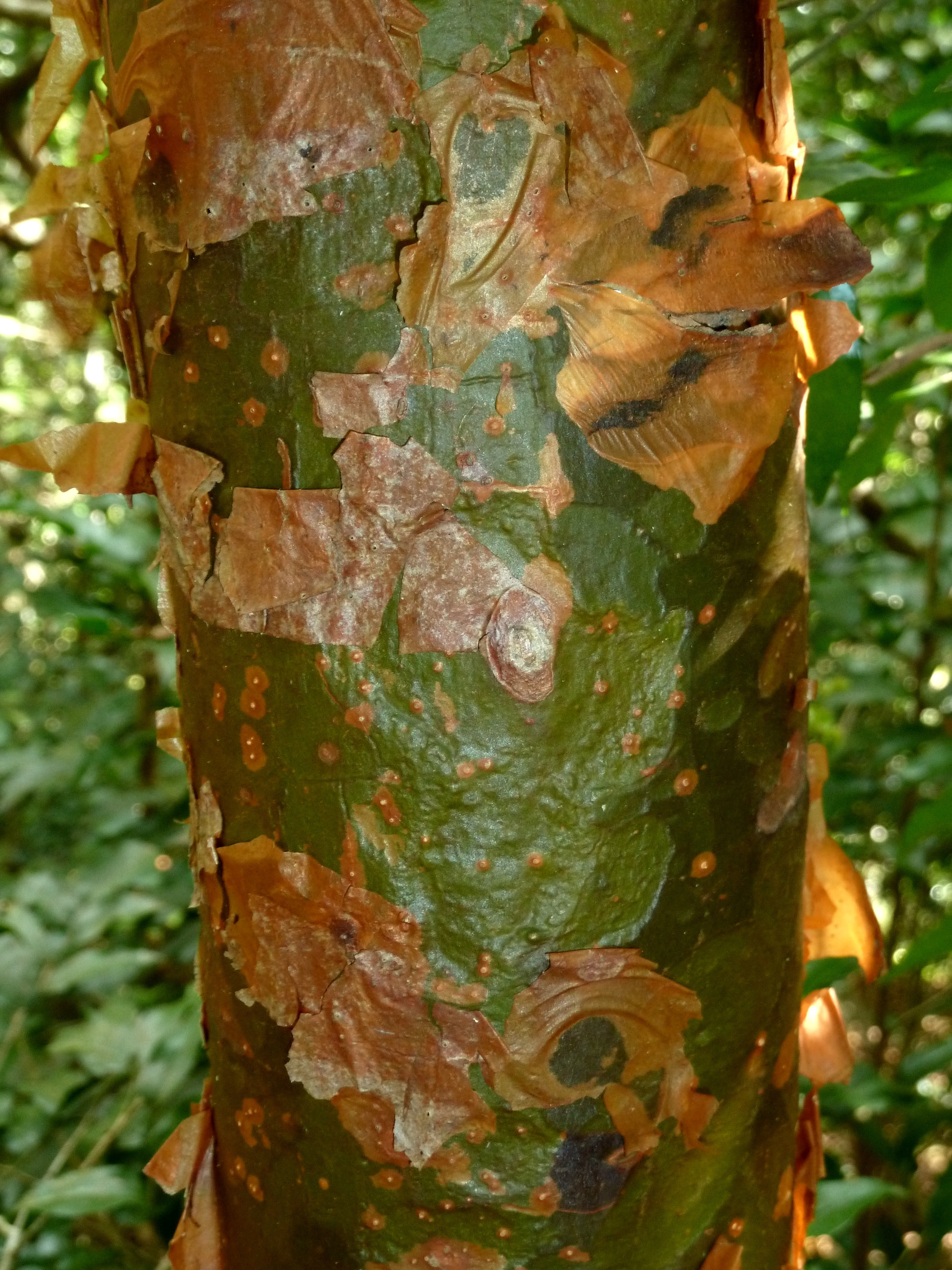
Commiphora harveyi

- Dacryodes edulis (G.Don) H.J.Lam
- Commiphora africana (A. Rich) Engl. (Commiphora pilosa, Commiphora sambesiaca)
- Commiphora anacardiifolia Dinter & Engl.
- Commiphora angolensis Engl.
- Commiphora caerulea Burtt
- Commiphora capensis (Sond.) Engl.
- Commiphora cervifolia Van der Walt
- Commiphora crenato-serrata Engl.
- Commiphora dinteri Engl.
- Commiphora discolor Mendes
- Commiphora edulis (Klotzsch) Engl.
- Commiphora giessii Van der Walt
- Commiphora glandulosa Schinz (Commiphora pyracanthoides Engl. subsp. glandulosa (Schinz) Wild)
- Commiphora glaucescens Engl.
- Commiphora gracilifrondosa Dinter ex J.J.A. v.d. Walt
- Commiphora harveyi (Engl.) Engl.
- Commiphora karibensis Wild
- Commiphora kraeuseliana Heine
- Commiphora marlothii Engl.
- Commiphora merkeri Engl.
- Commiphora mollis (Oliv.) Engl.
- Commiphora mossambicensis (Oliv.) Engl. (Commiphora fischeri Engl.)
- Commiphora multijuga (Hiern) K. Schum.
- Commiphora namaensis Schinz
- Commiphora neglecta Verdoorn
- Commiphora oblanceolata Schinz
- Commiphora pyracanthoides Engl.
- Commiphora saxicola Engl.
- Commiphora schimperi (O. Berg) Engl.
- Commiphora schlechteri Engl.
- Commiphora serrata Engl.
- Commiphora tenuipetiolata Engl.
- Commiphora ugogensis Engl.
- Commiphora virgata Engl.
- Commiphora wildii Merxm.
- Commiphora woodii Engl.
- Commiphora zanzibarica (Baill.) Engl.

== Meliaceae ==
- Khaya nyasica Stapf ex Baker f. (Khaya anthotheca (Welw.) C. DC.)
- Entandrophragma caudatum (Sprague) Sprague
- Entandrophragma spicatum (C.DC.) Sprague
- Lovoa swynnertonii Baker f.
- Xylocarpus granatum J.Koenig
- Nymania capensis (Thunb.) Lindb.
- Turraea fischeri Gürke
- Turraea floribunda Hochst.
- Turraea nilotica Kotschy & Peyr.
- Turraea obtusifolia Hochst.
- Turraea wakefieldii Oliv.
- Turraea zambesica Styles & White
- Turraeanthus africana (Welw. ex C.DC.) Pellegr.
- Ekebergia benguelensis Welw. ex C.DC. (Ekebergia arborea Baker f.)
- Ekebergia capensis Sparrm. (Ekebergia ruepelliana, Ekebergia meyeri, Ekebergia buchananii)
- Ekebergia pterophylla (C. DC.) Hofmeyr
- Trichilia capitata Klotzsch
- Trichilia dregeana Sond.
- Trichilia emetica Vahl
- Trichilia martiana C.DC. (Trichilia chirindensis Swynn. & Baker f.)
- Pseudobersama mossambicensis (Sim) Verdc. (Bersama mossambicensis)

== Malpighiaceae ==
- Triaspis glaucophylla Engl.
- Sphedamnocarpus galphimiifolius (A. Juss.) Szyszyl.
- Sphedamnocarpus pruriens (A. Juss.) Szyszyl.
- Sphedamnocarpus transvaalicus (Kuntze) Burtt Davy
- Acridocarpus natalitius Adr. & Juss.

== Polygalaceae ==
- Polygala lancifolia A. St.-Hil. & Moq. (Polygala virgata Thunb.)
- Polygala myrtifolia L.
- Securidaca longepedunculata Fresen.
- Carpolobia goetzei Gürke (Carpolobia conradsiana Engl.)

== Dichapetalaceae ==
- Tapura fischeri Engl.

== Phyllanthaceae ==
- Pseudophyllanthus ovalis (E.Mey. ex Sond.) Voronts. & Petra Hoffm. (Andrachne ovalis (Sond.) Muell. Arg.)
- Lachnostylis bilocularis R.A. Dyer
- Lachnostylis hirta (L.f.) Muell. Arg.
- Heywoodia lucens Sim
- Pseudolachnostylis maprouneifolia Pax
- Flueggea verrucosa (Thunb.) G.L.Webster (Phyllanthus verrucosus)
- Flueggea virosa (Roxb. ex Willd.) Royle (Securinega virosa (Roxb. ex Willd.) Baill.)
- Margaritaria discoidea (Baill.) Webster (Phyllanthus discoideus (Baill.) Muell. Arg.)
- Margaritaria discoidea (Baill.) Webster var. fagifolia (Pax) A. Radcliffe-Smith (Phyllanthus fagifolia)
- Margaritaria discoidea (Baill.) Webster var. nitida (Pax) A. Radcliffe-Smith (Flueggea nitida)
- Phyllanthus cedrelifolius Verdc.
- Phyllanthus engleri Pax
- Phyllanthus inflatus Hutch.
- Phyllanthus macranthus Pax
- Phyllanthus ovalifolius Forssk. (Phyllanthus guineensis Pax)
- Phyllanthus pinnatus (Wight) G.L.Webster (Phyllanthus kirkianus Müll.Arg.)
- Phyllanthus reticulatus Poir.
- Hymenocardia acida Tul.
- Hymenocardia ulmoides Oliv.
- Antidesma membranaceum Müll.Arg.
- Antidesma rufescens Tul.
- Antidesma venosum E. Mey. ex Tul.
- Uapaca kirkiana Müll.Arg.
- Uapaca lissopyrena Radcl.-Sm.
- Uapaca nitida Müll.Arg.
- Uapaca sansibarica Pax
- Cleistanthus polystachyus subsp. milleri (Dunkley) Radcl.-Sm. (Cleistanthus apetalus S.Moore)
- Cleistanthus schlechteri (Pax) Hutch.
- Bridelia atroviridis Müll.Arg.
- Bridelia cathartica Bertol.f.
- Bridelia cathartica Bertol.f. subsp. melanthesoides (Klotzsch ex Baill.) J.Léonard
- Bridelia micrantha (Hochst.) Baill.
- Bridelia mollis Hutch.
- Bridelia tenuifolia Muell. Arg.

== Putranjivaceae ==
- Drypetes arguta (Muell. Arg.) Hutch.
- Drypetes gerrardii Hutch. (Drypetes battiscombei Hutch.)
- Drypetes mossambicensis Hutch.
- Drypetes natalensis (Harv.) Hutch.
- Drypetes reticulata Pax

== Picrodendraceae ==
- Hyaenanche globosa (Gaertn.) Lamb. & Vahl
- Androstachys johnsonii Prain

== Euphorbiaceae ==
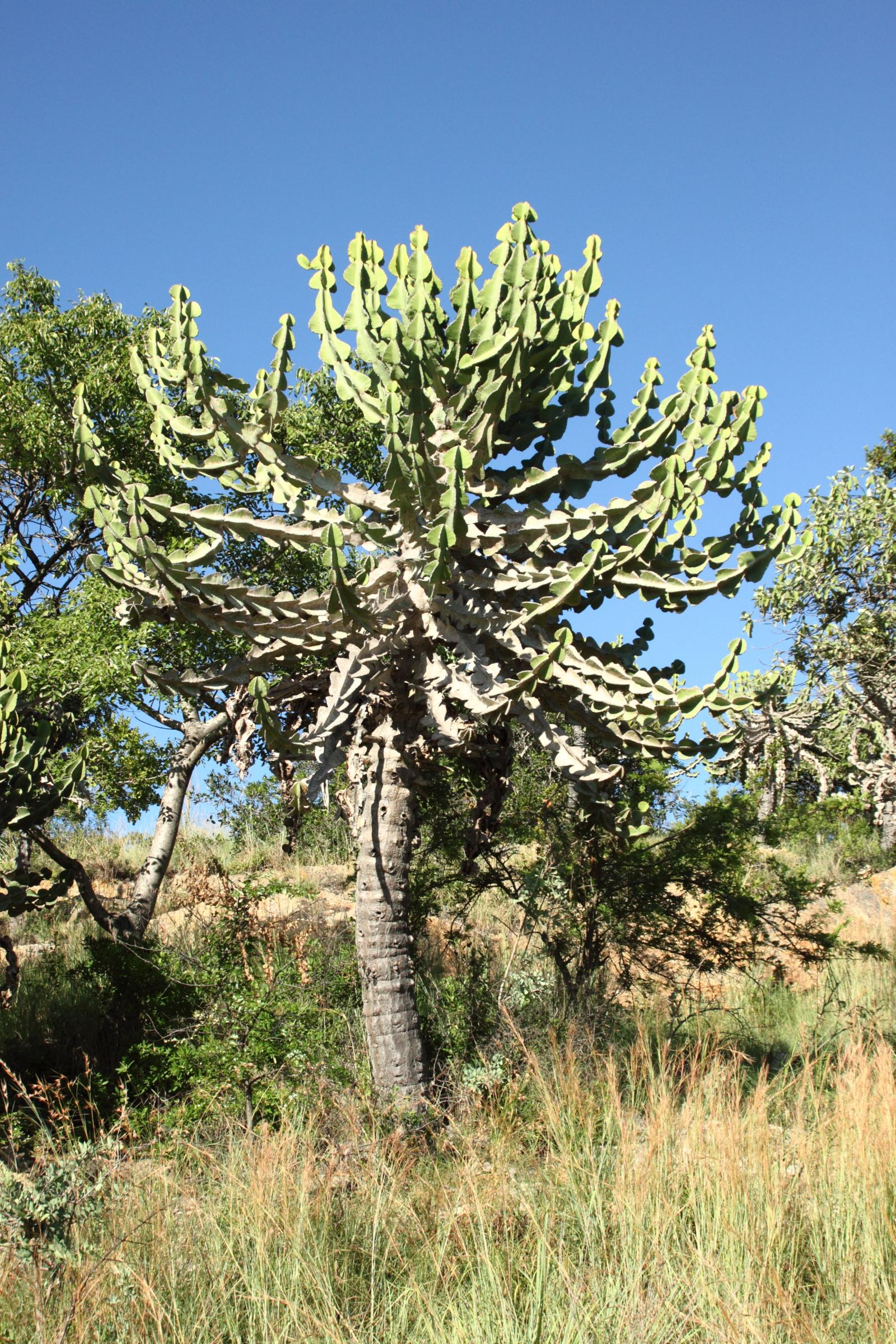
Euphorbia cooperi

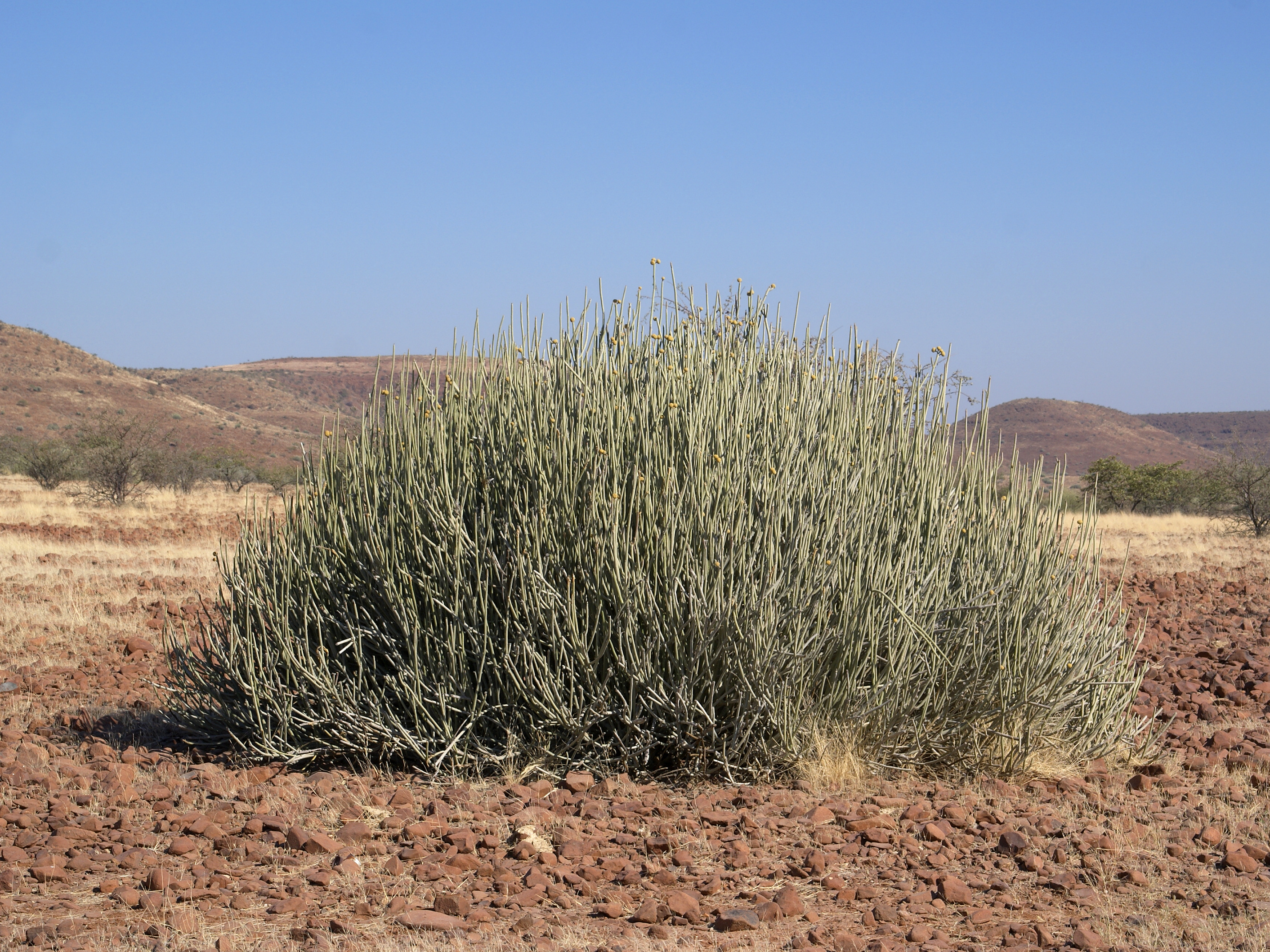
Euphorbia damarana

- Croton gratissimus Burch. (Croton zambesicus Müll.Arg.)
- Croton gratissimus Burch. var. subgratissimus (Prain) Burtt Davy
- Croton leuconeurus Pax
- Croton longipedicellatus J.Léonard
- Croton madadensis S. Moore
- Croton megalobotrys Muell. Arg.
- Croton megalocarpus Hutch.
- Croton menyhartii Pax
- Croton pseudopulchellus Pax
- Croton scheffleri Pax
- Croton steenkampianus Gerstner
- Croton sylvaticus Hochst.
- Cavacoa aurea (Cavaco) J. Léonard
- Erythrococca berberidea Prain (Micrococca berberidea (Prain) E.Phillips)
- Erythrococca menyhartii (Pax) Prain
- Erythrococca polyandra (Pax & K.Hoffm.) Prain
- Micrococca capensis (Baill.) Prain
- Tannodia swynnertonii (S.Moore) Prain
- Mallotus oppositifolius (Geiseler) Müll.Arg.
- Argomuellera macrophylla Pax
- Alchornea hirtella f. glabrata (Müll.Arg.) Pax & K.Hoffm.
- Alchornea laxiflora (Benth.) Pax & K. Hoffm.
- Necepsia castaneifolia (Baill.) Bouchat & J.Léonard (Neopalissya castaneifolia (Baill.) Pax)
- Neoboutonia melleri (Müll.Arg.) Prain
- Macaranga capensis (Baill.) Benth. ex Sim (Macaranga bachmannii)
- Macaranga mellifera Prain
- Acalypha chirindica S.Moore
- Acalypha fruticosa Forssk.
- Acalypha glabrata Thunb.
- Acalypha sonderiana Muell. Arg.
- Jatropha spicata Pax (Jatropha messinica E.A. Bruce)
- Cephalocroton mollis Klotzsch
- Clutia abyssinica Jaub. & Spach (Clutia glabrescens)
- Clutia pulchella L.
- Schinziophyton rautanenii (Schinz) Radcl.-Sm. (Ricinodendron rautanenii Schinz)
- Suregada africana (Sond.) Müll.Arg.
- Suregada procera (Prain) Croizat
- Suregada zanzibariensis Baill.
- Spirostachys africana Sond.
- Excoecaria bussei (Pax) Pax
- Excoecaria madagascariensis (Baill.) Müll.Arg.
- Excoecaria simii (Kuntze) Pax
- Plesiatropha carpinifolia (Pax) Breteler (Mildbraedia carpinifolia (Pax) Hutch.)
- Shirakiopsis elliptica (Hochst.) Esser (Sapium ellipticum (Hochst.) Pax)
- Sclerocroton integerrimus Hochst. (Sapium integerrimum (Hochst.) J. Léonard)
- Maprounea africana Muell. Arg.
- Euphorbia angularis Klotzsch
- Euphorbia avasmontana Dinter
- Euphorbia confinalis R.A. Dyer
- Euphorbia cooperi N.E. Br. ex Berger
- Euphorbia curvirama R.A. Dyer
- Euphorbia damarana Leach
- Euphorbia decliviticola L. C. Leach
- Euphorbia eduardoi Leach
- Euphorbia espinosa Pax
- Euphorbia evansii Pax
- Euphorbia excelsa A.C.White, R.A.Dyer & B.Sloane
- Euphorbia fortissima L.C.Leach
- Euphorbia grandialata R.A. Dyer
- Euphorbia grandicornis Goeb. ex N.E. Br.
- Euphorbia grandidens Haw.
- Euphorbia gregaria Marloth
- Euphorbia griseola Pax
- Euphorbia guerichiana Pax
- Euphorbia gummifera Boiss.
- Euphorbia halipedicola L.C.Leach
- Euphorbia ingens E. Mey. ex Boiss.
- Euphorbia keithii R.A. Dyer
- Euphorbia knobelii Letty
- Euphorbia lividiflora L.C.Leach
- Euphorbia lugardae (N.E.Br.) Bruyns (Monadenium lugardae N.E.Br.)
- Euphorbia lydenburgensis Schweickerdt & Letty
- Euphorbia malevola L.C. Leach
- Euphorbia matabelensis Pax
- Euphorbia monteiroi Hook.
- Euphorbia perangusta R.A.Dyer
- Euphorbia pseudocactus A.Berger
- Euphorbia rowlandii R.A. Dyer
- Euphorbia sekukuniensis R.A. Dyer
- Euphorbia tetragona Haw.
- Euphorbia tirucalli L.
- Euphorbia triangularis Desf.
- Euphorbia venenata Marloth
- Euphorbia virosa Willd.
- Euphorbia waterbergensis R.A. Dyer
- Euphorbia wildii L.C.Leach
- Euphorbia zoutpansbergensis R.A. Dyer
- Synadenium cupulare (Boiss.) L.C. Wheeler

== Buxaceae ==
- Buxus macowanii Oliv.
- Buxus natalensis (Oliv.) Hutch.

== Anacardiaceae ==
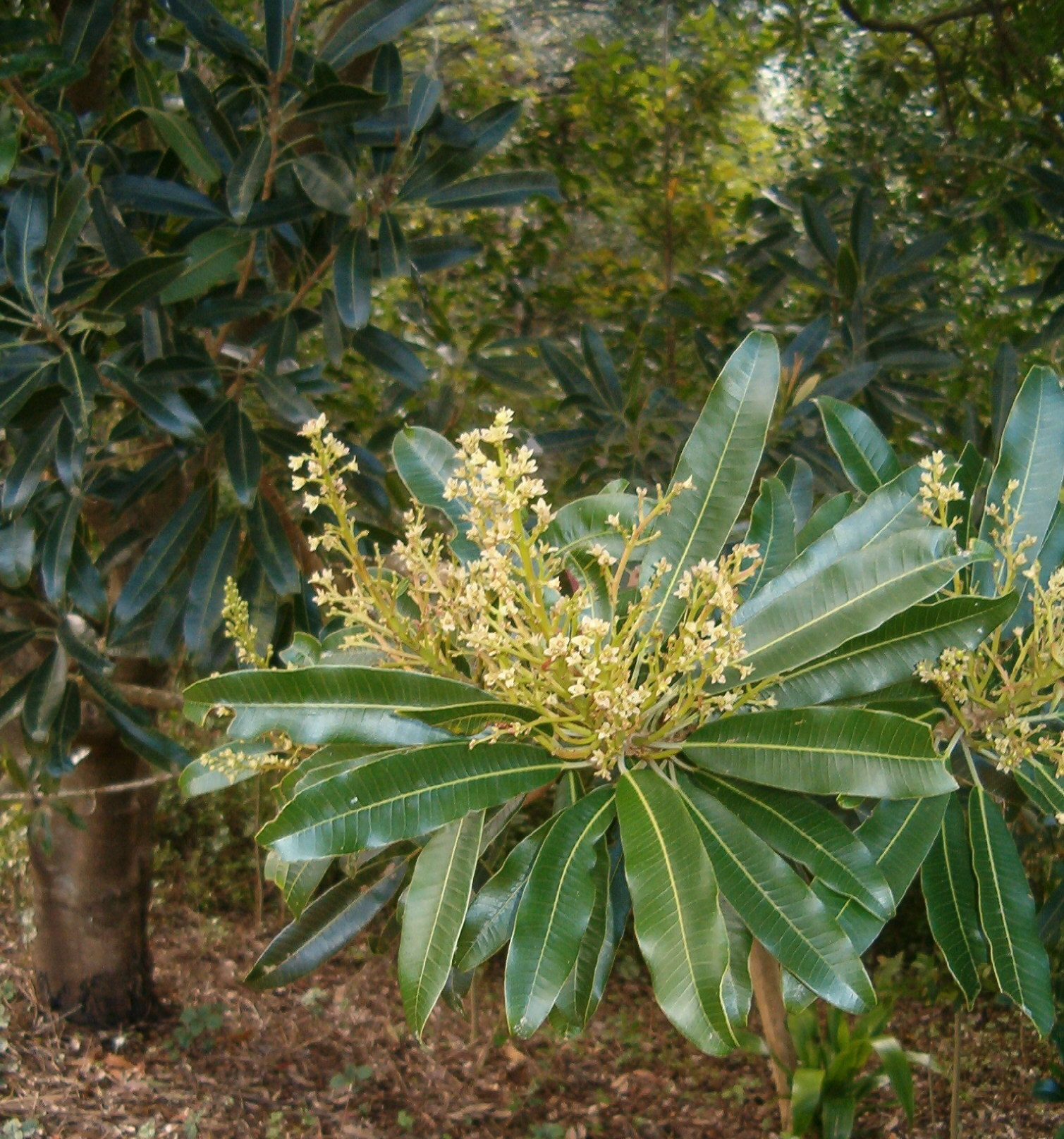
Protorhus longifolia

- Sclerocarya birrea subsp. afra (Sond.) Kokwaro (Sclerocarya afra Sond.)
- Harpephyllum afrum Bernh.
- Lannea antiscorbutica (Hiern) Engl.
- Lannea discolor (Sond.) Engl.
- Lannea humilis (Oliv.) Engl.
- Lannea schimperi (Hochst. ex A.Rich.) Engl.
- Lannea schweinfurthii (Engl.) Engl. var. stuhlmannii (Engl.) Kokwaro
- Lannea schweinfurthii (Engl.) Engl. var. tomentosa (Dunkley) Kokwaro
- Sorindeia juglandifolia (A.Rich.) Planchon ex Oliver
- Trichoscypha ulugurensis Mildbr.
- Protorhus longifolia (Bernh.) Engl.
- Loxostylis alata Spreng.f. ex Reichb.
- Laurophyllus capensis Thunb.
- Smodingium argutum E. Mey. ex Sond.
- Heeria argentea (Thunb.) Meisn.
- Ozoroa argyrochrysea (Engl. & Gilg) R.Fern. & A.Fern.
- Ozoroa bredoi R.Fern. & A.Fern.
- Ozoroa concolor (Presl ex Sond.) De Winter
- Ozoroa crassinervia (Engl.) R. & A. Fernandes
- Ozoroa dispar R. & A. Fernandes
- Ozoroa engleri R. & A. Fernandes
- Ozoroa hereroensis (Schinz) R. Fern. & A. Fern.
- Ozoroa homblei (De Wild.) R.Fern. & A.Fern.
- Ozoroa insignis Del. subsp. reticulata (Bak.f.) J.B. Gillett (Ozoroa reticulata (Baker f.) R.Fern. & A.Fern.)
- Ozoroa longipes (Engl. & Gilg) R. & A. Fernandes
- Ozoroa longipetiolata R. Fern. & A. Fern.
- Ozoroa mucronata (Bernh. ex Krauss) R. & A. Fernandes
- Ozoroa namaensis (Schinz & Dinter) R. Fernandes
- Ozoroa namaquensis (Sprague) I. von Teichman & A.E. van Wyk
- Ozoroa nitida (Engl. & Brehmer) R. Fern. & A. Fern.
- Ozoroa obovata (Oliv.) R. & A. Fernandes
- Ozoroa okavangensis R.Fern. & A.Fern.
- Ozoroa paniculosa (Sond.) R. & A. Fernandes
- Ozoroa schinzii (Engl.) R. Fern. & A. Fern.
- Ozoroa sphaerocarpa R. & A. Fernandes
- Rhus angustifolia L.
- Rhus batophylla Codd
- Rhus burchellii Sond. ex Engl.
- Rhus carnosula Schönl
- Rhus chirindensis Bak.f.
- Rhus ciliata Licht. ex Schultes
- Rhus crenata Thunb.
- Rhus dentata Thunb.
- Rhus dura Schönl.
- Rhus engleri Britt.
- Rhus erosa Thunb.
- Rhus fastigiata Eckl. & Zeyh.
- Rhus fraseri Schönland
- Rhus gerrardii Schönland (Rhus montana var. gerrardii R. Fern.)
- Rhus glauca Thunb.
- Rhus gueinzii Sond.
- Rhus incisa L.f.
- Rhus krebsiana Presl ex Engl.
- Rhus laevigata L.
- Rhus longipes Engl.
- Rhus longispina Eckl. & Zeyh.
- Rhus lucens Hutch.
- Rhus lucida L.
- Rhus magalismontana Sond.
- Rhus microcarpa Schönl.
- Rhus montana Diels
- Rhus nebulosa Schönland

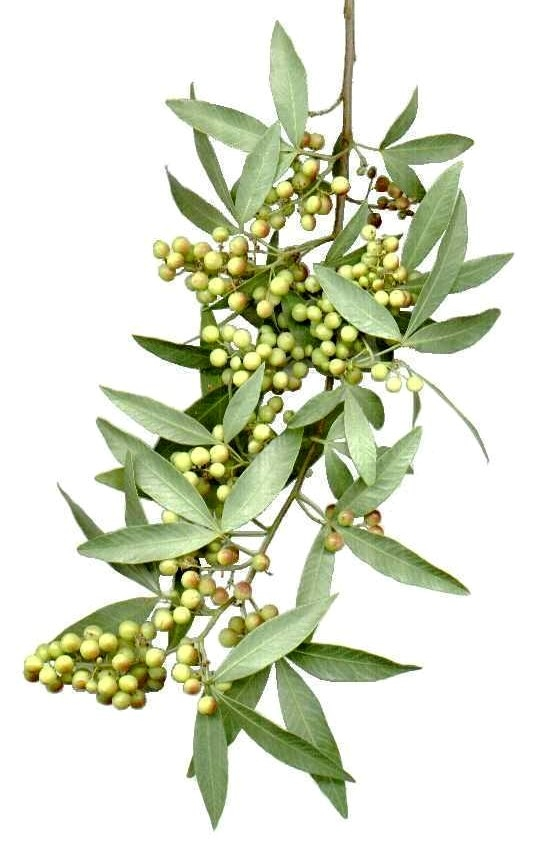
Rhus pendulina

- Rhus pendulina Jacq.
- Rhus pentheri Zahlbr.
- Rhus problematodes Merxm. & Roessler
- Rhus pyroides Burch. var. pyroides (Rhus baurii Schönland)
- Rhus quartiniana A. Rich.
- Rhus rehmanniana Engl. (Rhus macowanii Schönland)
- Rhus rigida Mill. (Rhus eckloniana Sond.)
- Rhus tenuinervis Engl.
- Rhus tomentosa L.
- Rhus transvaalensis Engl.
- Rhus tumulicola S. Moore (Rhus culminum A. Fern. & R. Fern.)(Rhus dura Schönland)
- Rhus zeyheri Sond.
- Searsia burchellii (Sond. ex Engl.) Moffett (Rhus undulata var. burchellii Schönland)
- Searsia lancea (L.f.) F.A.Barkley (Rhus lancea L.f.)
- Searsia leptodictya (Diels) T.S.Yi, A.J.Mill. & J.Wen (Rhus leptodictya Diels)
- Searsia marlothii (Engl.) Moffett (Rhus marlothii Engl.)
- Searsia natalensis (Bernh. ex C.Krauss) F.A.Barkley (Rhus natalensis Bernh. ex C.Krauss)
- Searsia populifolia (E.Mey. ex Sond.) Moffett (Rhus populifolia E.Mey. ex Sond.)
- Searsia pyroides (Burch.) Moffett (Rhus pyroides Burch.)
- Searsia quartiniana (A.Rich.) A.J.Mill. (Rhus quartiniana A.Rich.)
- Searsia tenuinervis (Engl.) Moffett (Rhus tenuinervis Engl.)
- Searsia undulata (Jacq.) T.S.Yi, A.J.Mill. & J.Wen (Rhus undulata Jacq.)
- Searsia volkii (Suess.) Moffett (Rhus volkii Suess.)

== Aquifoliaceae ==
- Ilex mitis (L.) Radlk.

== Celastraceae ==
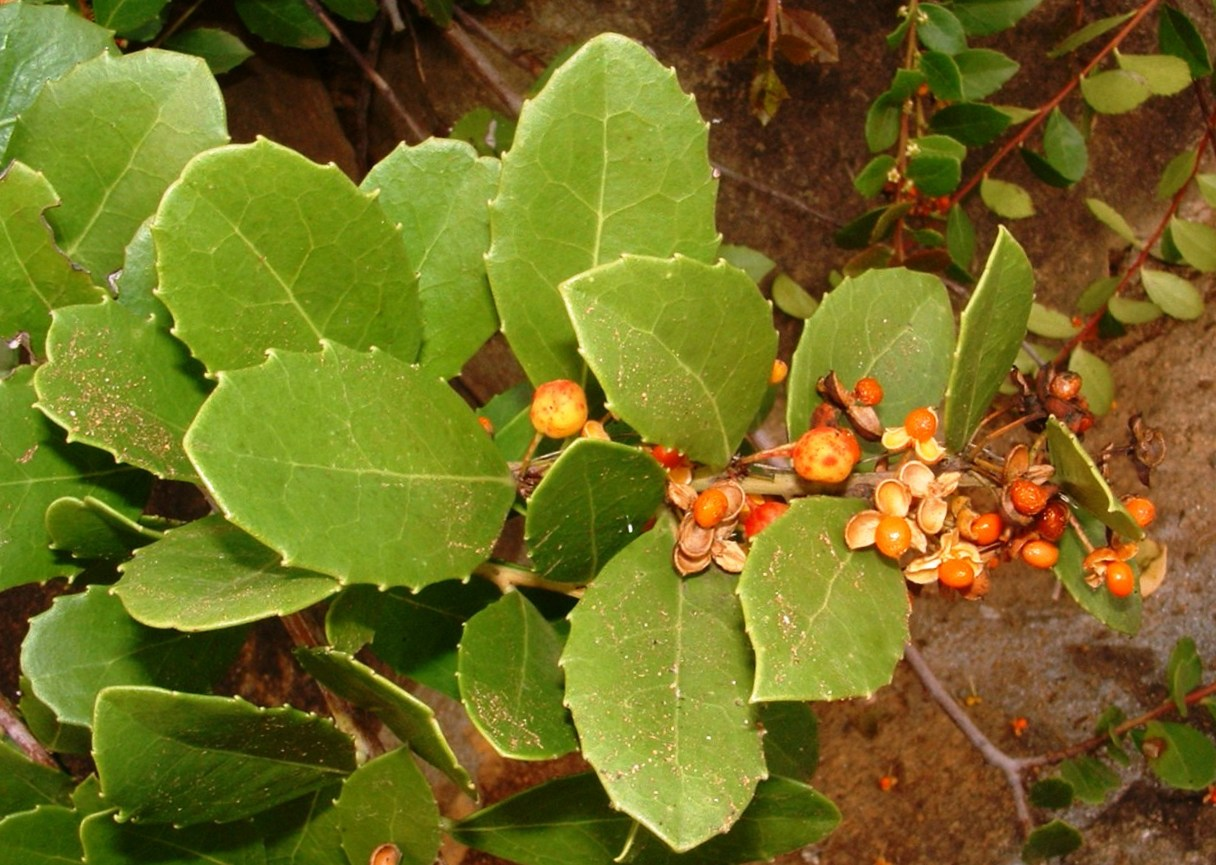
Maytenus procumbens

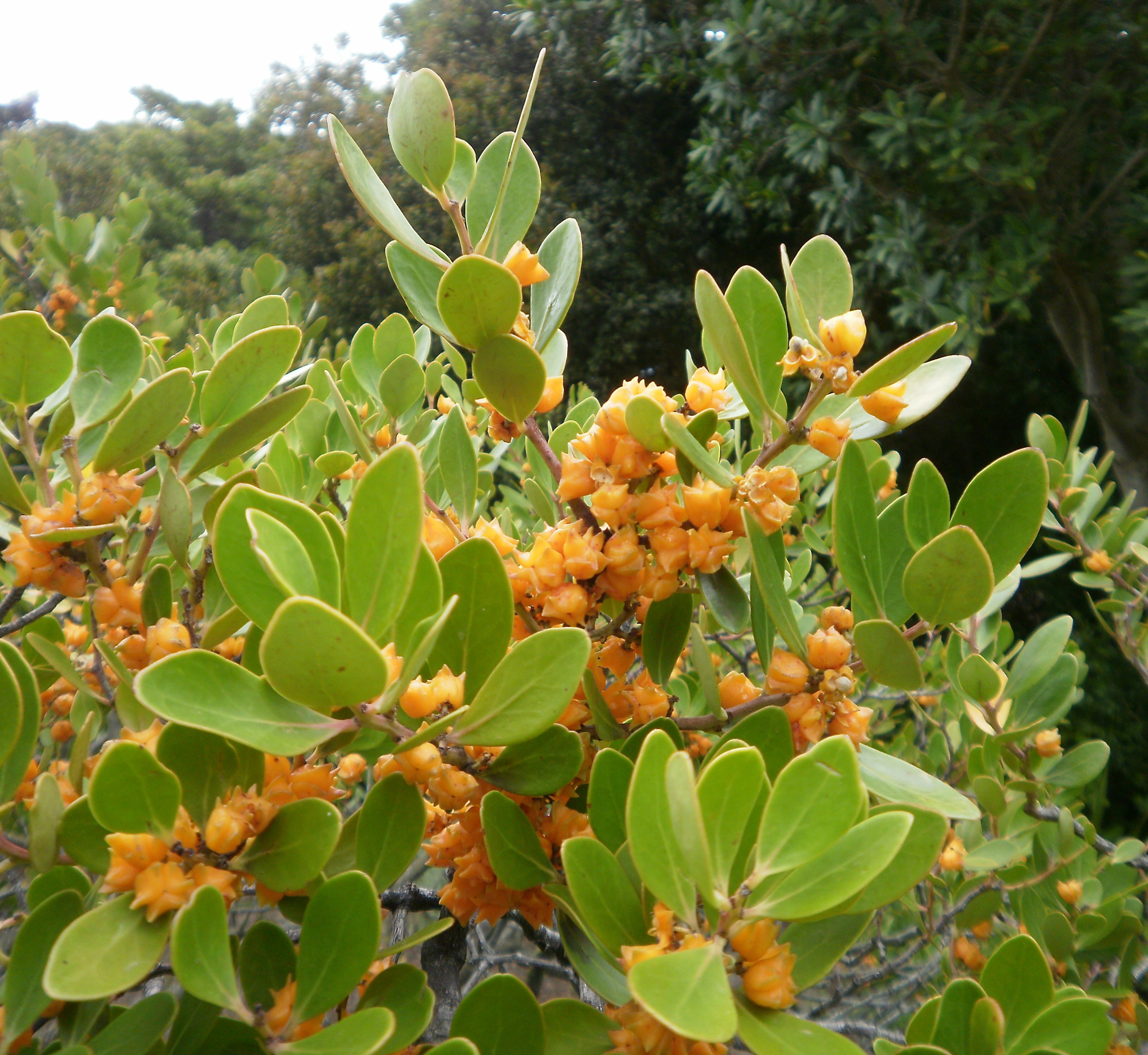
Pterocelastrus tricuspidatus

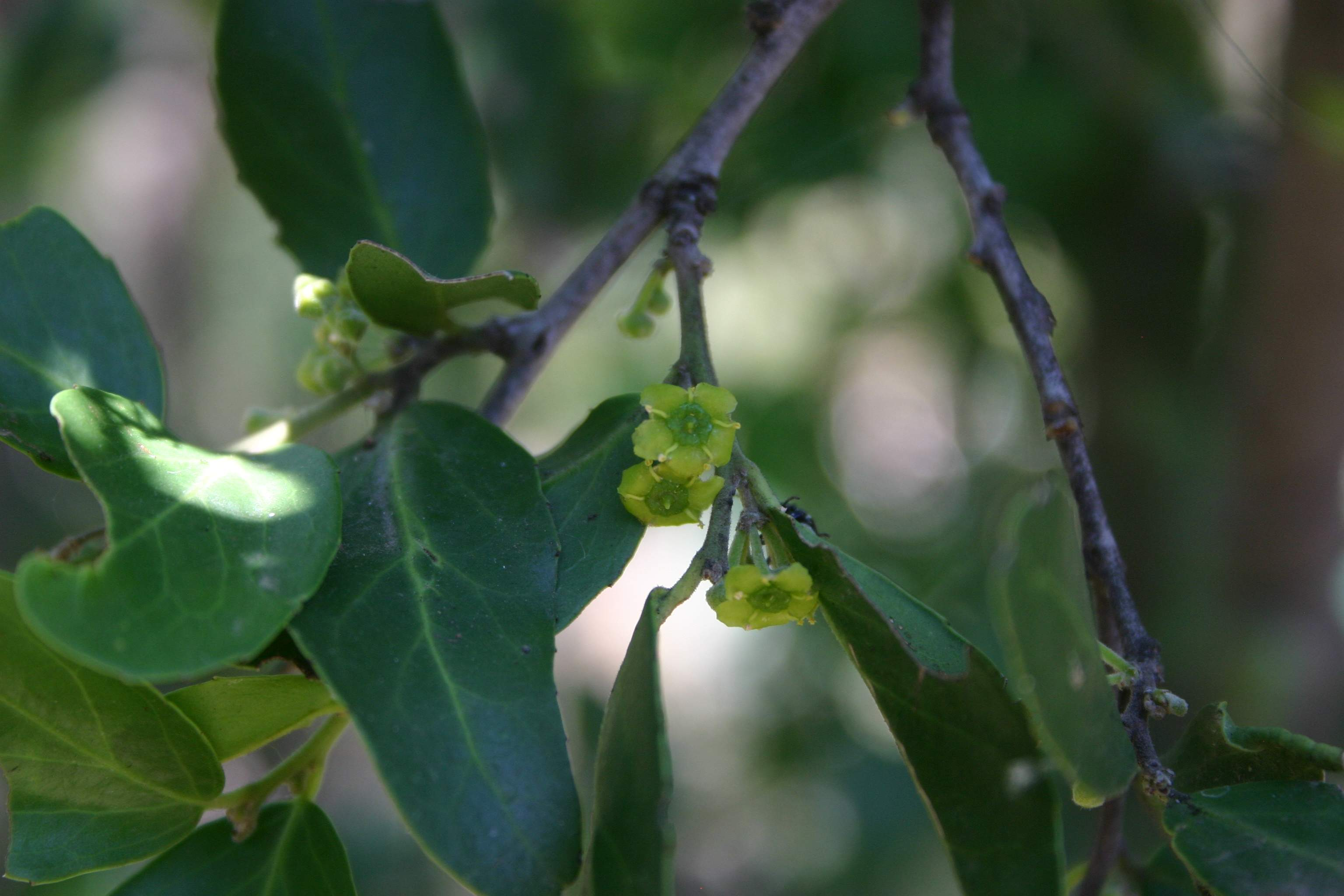
Cassine burkeana

- Brexia madagascariensis (Lam.) Thouars ex Ker Gawl.
- Gymnosporia arenicola Jordaan
- Gymnosporia buxifolia (L.) Szyszyl.
- Maytenus abbottii Van Wyk
- Maytenus acuminata (L.f.) Loes. var. acuminata
- Maytenus bachmannii (Loes.) Marais
- Maytenus chasei N. Robson
- Maytenus cordata Loes.
- Maytenus lucida Loes.
- Maytenus nemorosa (Eckl. & Zeyh.) Marais
- Maytenus oleoides (Lam.) Loes.
- Maytenus oxycarpa N. Robson
- Maytenus peduncularis (Sond.) Loes.
- Maytenus procumbens (L.f.) Loes.
- Maytenus pubescens N. Robson
- Maytenus tenuispina (Sond.) Marais
- Maytenus undata (Thunb.) Blakelock (Celastrus huillensis Welw. ex Oliv.)
- Gymnosporia gariepensis Jordaan
- Gymnosporia harveyana Loes. (Maytenus mossambicensis (Klotzsch) Blakelock)
- Gymnosporia heterophylla (Eckl. & Zeyh.) Loes. (Maytenus heterophylla (Eckl. & Zeyh.) N.K.B. Robson)
- Gymnosporia linearis (L.f.) Loes. (Maytenus linearis (L.f.) Marais)
- Gymnosporia maranguensis (Loes.) Loes.
- Gymnosporia polyacanthus Szyszył. (Maytenus polyacantha (Sond.) Marais)
- Gymnosporia putterlickioides Loes. (Maytenus putterlickioides (Loes.) Exell & Mendonça)
- Gymnosporia rubra (Harv.) Loes. (Maytenus mossambicensis (Klotzsch) Blakelock var. rubra (Harv.) Blakelock)
- Gymnosporia senegalensis (Lam.) Loes. (Maytenus senegalensis (Lam.) Exell)
- Putterlickia pyracantha (L.) Endl.
- Putterlickia verrucosa (E. Mey. ex Sond.) Szyszyl.
- Catha edulis (Vahl.) Forsk. ex Endl.
- Catha transvaalensis Codd
- Pterocelastrus echinatus N.E. Br.
- Pterocelastrus rostratus (Thunb.) Walp.
- Pterocelastrus tricuspidatus (Lam.) Sond.
- Cassine aethiopica Thunb. (Mystroxylon aethiopicum (Thunb.) Loes.)
- Cassine barbara L
- Cassine burkeana (Sond.) Kuntze
- Cassine crocea (Thunb.) Kuntze
- Cassine eucleiformis (Eckl. & Zeyh.) Kuntze
- Cassine matabelica (Loes.) Steedman
- Cassine maritima (Bolus) L.Bolus
- Cassine papillosa (Hochst.) Kuntze
- Cassine parvifolia Sond.
- Cassine peragua L.
- Cassine peragua subsp. barbata (L.) R.H.Archer (Cassine barbara L.)
- Cassine schinoides (Spreng.) R.H.Archer (Hartogiella schinoides (Spreng.) Codd)
- Cassine schlechteriana Loes.
- Cassine tetragona (L.f.) Loes.
- Cassine transvaalensis (Burtt Davy) Codd ( Elaeodendron transvaalense (Burtt Davy) R.H.Archer)
- Allocassine laurifolia (Harv.) N.K.B. Robson
- Maurocenia frangularia (L.) Mill.
- Pleurostylia africana Loes.
- Pleurostylia capensis (Turcz.) Oliv.
- Loeseneriella africana var. richardiana (Cambess.) R.Wilczek ex N.Hallé
- Hippocratea buchananii Loes.
- Hippocratea crenata (Klotzsch) K. Schum. & Loes.
- Hippocratea longipetiolata Oliv.
- Loeseneriella crenata (Klotzsch) R.Wilczek (Gymnema crenata Klotzsch)
- Prionostemma delagoensis (Loes.) N.Hallé (Hippocratea delagoensis Loes., Pristimera delagoensis (Loes.) R.H.Archer)
- Elachyptera parvifolia (Oliv.) N.Hallé (Hippocratea parvifolia Oliv.)
- Pristimera andongensis var. volkensii (Loes.) N. Hallé & B. Mathew (Hippocratea volkensii Loes.)
- Pristimera longipetiolata (Oliv.) N. Hallé
- Pristimera peglerae (Loes.) R.H.Archer
- Salacia leptoclada Tul.
- Pseudosalacia streyi Codd
- Reissantia buchananii (Loes.) N. Hallé
- Reissantia indica (Willd.) N.Hallé (Hippocratea indica Willd. Pristimera indica (Willd.) A.C.Sm.)
- Reissantia buchananii (Loes.) N. Hallé (Hippocratea buchananii Loes.)
- Reissantia indica (Willd.) N.Hallé (Hippocratea indica Willd.)
- Reissantia parviflora (N.E.Br.) N.Hallé

== Icacinaceae ==
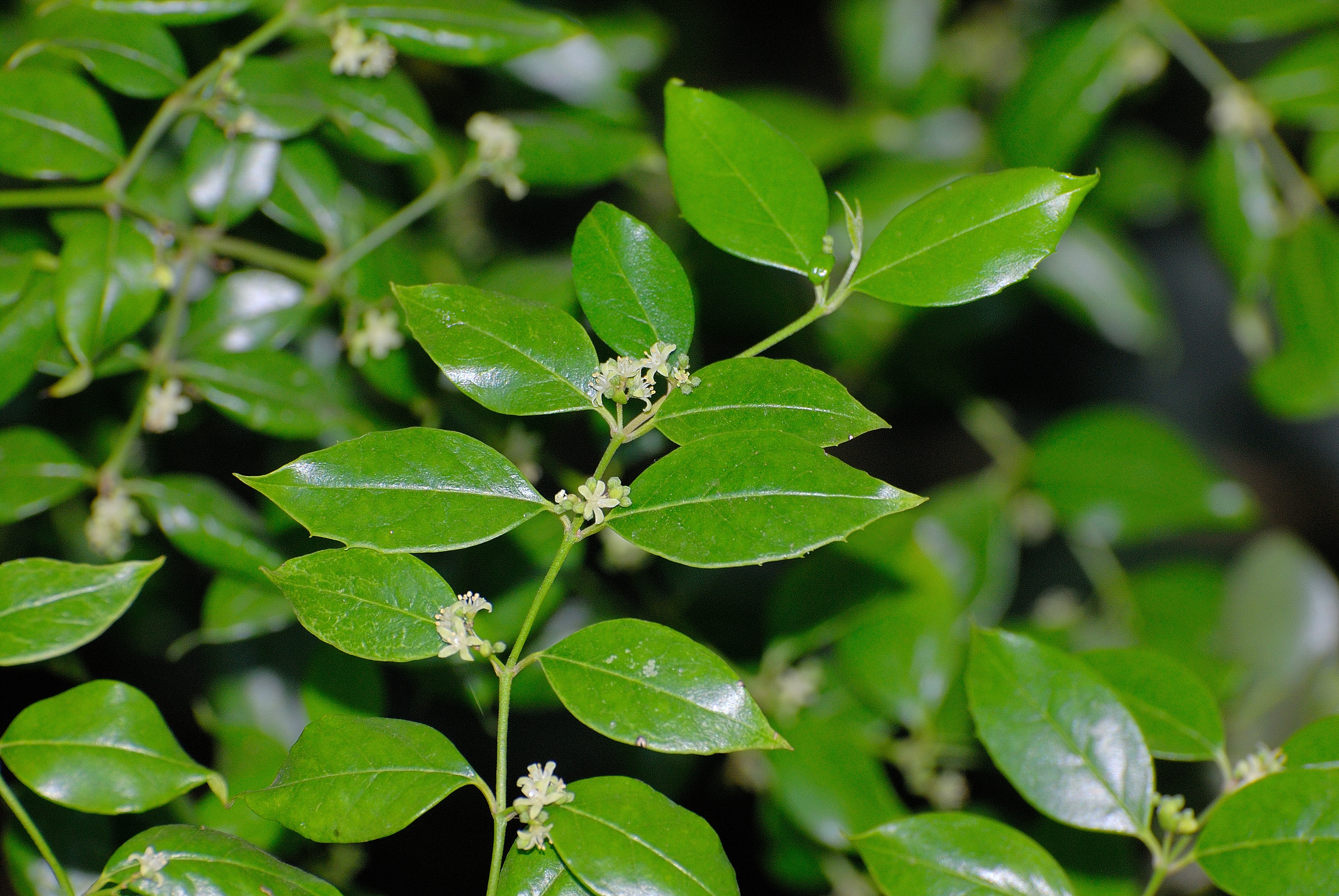
Cassinopsis ilicifolia

- Cassinopsis ilicifolia (Hochst.) Kuntze
- Cassinopsis tinifolia Harv.
- Apodytes dimidiata E. Mey. ex Arn.
- Pyrenacantha grandiflora Baill.
- Pyrenacantha malvifolia Engl.
- Pyrenacantha scandens Planch. ex Harv.
- Rhaphiostylis beninensis (Hook.f. ex Planch.) Planch. ex Benth. (Apodytes beninensis Hook.f. ex Planch.)

== Sapindaceae ==
- Allophylus abyssinicus (Hochst.) Radlk.
- Allophylus africanus Beauv.
- Allophylus chaunostachys Gilg
- Allophylus chirindensis Baker f.
- Allophylus decipiens (E.Mey.) Radlk.
- Allophylus dregeanus (Sond.) De Winter
- Allophylus melanocarpus (Sond.) Radlk.
- Allophylus natalensis (Sond.) De Winter
- Allophylus rubifolius var. alnifolius (Baker) Friis & Vollesen (Allophylus alnifolius (Baker) Radlk.)
- Atalaya alata (Sim) H. Forbes
- Atalaya capensis R.A. Dyer
- Atalaya natalensis R.A. Dyer
- Deinbollia oblongifolia (E. Mey. ex Arn.) Radlk.
- Deinbollia xanthocarpa (E. Mey.) Radlk.
- Lepisanthes senegalensis (Poir.) Leenh. (Aphania senegalensis (Poir.) Radlk.)
- Pancovia golungensis (Hiern) Exell & Mendonça
- Smelophyllum capense Radlk.
- Glenniea africana (Radlk.) Leenh.
- Lecaniodiscus fraxinifolia Baker
- Haplocoelum foliolosum (Hiern) Bullock
- Haplocoelum gallense (Engl.) Radlk.
- Macphersonia gracilis var. hildebrandtii (O. Hoffm.) Capuron (Macphersonia hildebrandtii O. Hoffm.)
- Pappea capensis Eckl. & Zeyh.
- Stadmannia oppositifolia Poir. subsp. rhodesica Exell
- Aporrhiza paniculata Radlk. (Aporrhiza nitida Gilg ex Milne-Redh.)
- Blighia unijugata Bak.
- Erythrophysa alata (Eckl. & Zeyh.) Hutch.
- Erythrophysa transvaalensis Verdoorn
- Dodonaea viscosa Jacq.
- Dodonaea viscosa subsp. angustifolia (L.f.) J.G.West (Dodonaea angustifolia L.f.)
- Hippobromus pauciflorus (L.f.) Radlk.
- Zanha africana (Radlk.) Exell
- Zanha golungensis Hiern

== Melianthaceae ==
- Bersama abyssinica Fresen.
- Bersama lucens (Hochst.) Szyszyl.
- Bersama stayneri Phill.
- Bersama swinnyi Phill.
- Bersama swynnertonii Baker f.
- Bersama transvaalensis Turrill
- Bersama tysoniana Oliv.

== Greyiaceae ==
- Greyia flanaganii H. Bol.
- Greyia radlkoferi Szyszyl.
- Greyia sutherlandii Hook. & Harv.

== Rhamnaceae ==
- Ziziphus abyssinica Hochst. ex A.Rich.
- Ziziphus jujuba Mill. (Ziziphus mauritiana Lam.)
- Ziziphus mucronata Willd.
- Ziziphus pubescens Oliv.
- Ziziphus rivularis Codd
- Berchemia discolor (Klotzsch) Hemsl.
- Berchemia zeyheri (Sond.) Grubov
- Scutia myrtina (Burm.f.) Kurz
- Rhamnus prinoides L'Herit.
- Rhamnus staddo A.Rich.
- Noltea africana (L.) Reichb.f.
- Colubrina asiatica (L.) Brongn.
- Phylica buxifolia L.
- Phylica oleifolia Vent.
- Phylica paniculata Willd.
- Phylica purpurea Sond.
- Phylica villosa Thunb.
- Lasiodiscus mildbraedii Engl.
- Lasiodiscus pervillei Baill.
- Lasiodiscus usambarensis Engl.
- Helinus integrifolius (Lam.) Kuntze
- Helinus spartioides Schinz Ex Engl.

== Vitaceae ==
- Cyphostemma bainesii (Hook.f.) Desc.
- Cyphostemma currorii (Hook.f.) Desc.
- Cyphostemma juttae (Dinter & Gilg) Desc.
- Cyphostemma uter (Exell & Mendonça) Desc.
- Rhoicissus capensis (Burm. f.) Planch.
- Rhoicissus digitata (L.f.) Gilg & Brandt
- Rhoicissus revoilii Planch.
- Rhoicissus rhomboidea (E. Mey ex Harv.) Planch.
- Rhoicissus tomentosa (Lam.) Wild & Drummond
- Rhoicissus tridentata (L.f.) Wild & Drummond
- Rhoicissus tridentata subsp. cuneifolia (Eckl. & Zeyh.) Urton (Rhoicissus cuneifolia (Eckl. & Zeyh.) Planch.)
- Cissus cornifolia (Bak.f.) Planch
- Cissus integrifolia (Baker) Planch.
- Cissus nymphaeifolia (Welw. ex Baker) Planch.
- Cissus quadrangularis L.
- Cissus rotundifolia (Forssk.) Vahl

== Malvaceae ==
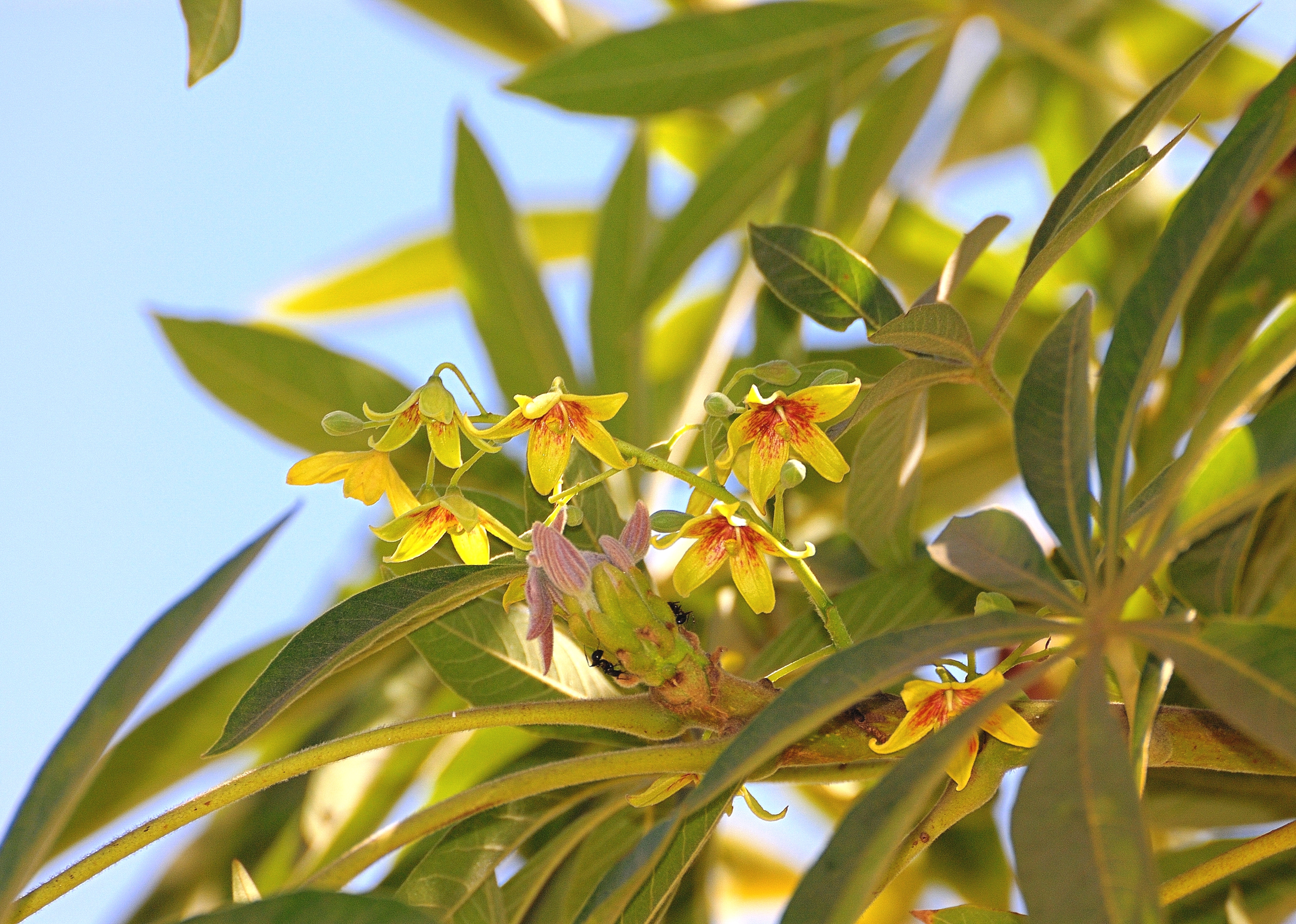
Sterculia murex

- Adansonia digitata L.
- Cola greenwayi Brenan
- Cola mossambicensis Wild
- Cola natalensis Oliv.
- Dombeya autumnalis Verdoorn
- Dombeya burgessiae Gerr. ex Harv.
- Dombeya cymosa Harv.
- Dombeya kirkii Mast.
- Dombeya pulchra N.E. Br.
- Dombeya rotundifolia (Hochst.) Planch.
- Dombeya shupangae K.Schum.
- Dombeya tiliacea (Endl.) Planch.
- Glyphaea tomentosa Mast.
- Gossypium anomalum Wawra & Peyr.
- Gossypium herbaceum L.
- Gossypium triphyllum (Haw.) Hochr.
- Grewia afra Meisn.
- Grewia avellana Hiern
- Grewia falcistipula K.Schum.
- Grewia flava DC.
- Grewia flavescens Juss.
- Grewia flavescens var. olukondae (Schinz) Wild
- Grewia forbesii Harv. ex Mast.
- Grewia gracillima Wild
- Grewia hexamita Burret
- Grewia hornbyi Wild
- Grewia inaequilatera Garcke
- Grewia lasiocarpa E. Mey ex Harv.
- Grewia lepidopetala Garcke
- Grewia micrantha Bojer
- Grewia microcarpa K.Schum.
- Grewia microthyrsa K. Schum. ex Burret
- Grewia monticola Sond.
- Grewia occidentalis L. (Grewia chirindae Baker f.)
- Grewia pachycalyx K.Schum.
- Grewia praecox K.Schum.
- Grewia retinervis Burret
- Grewia robusta Burch.
- Grewia schinzii K. Schum.
- Grewia stolzii Ulbr.
- Grewia subspathulata N.E.Br.
- Grewia sulcata Mast.
- Grewia tenax (Forssk.) Fiori
- Grewia transzambesica Wild
- Grewia truncata Mast.
- Grewia villosa Willd.
- Heritiera littoralis Aiton
- Hibiscus burtt-davyi Dunkley
- Hibiscus caesius Garcke
- Hibiscus calyphyllus Cav.
- Hibiscus castroi Baker f. & Exell
- Hibiscus diversifolius Jacq.
- Hibiscus dongolensis Caill. ex Delile
- Hibiscus micranthus L.f.
- Hibiscus mossambicensis Gonç.
- Hibiscus tiliaceus L.
- Rhodognaphalon mossambicense (A.Robyns) A.Robyns
- Sparrmannia africana L.f.
- Sterculia africana (Lour.) Fiori
- Sterculia alexandri Harv.
- Sterculia appendiculata K. Schum.
- Sterculia murex Hemsl.
- Sterculia quinqueloba (Garcke) K. Schum.
- Sterculia rogersii N.E. Br.
- Thespesia acutiloba (Bak.f.) Exell & Mendonça
- Thespesia garckeana F.Hoffm.
- Thespesia populnea (L.) Sol. ex Corrêa
- Triplochiton zambesiacus Milne-Redh.

== Ochnaceae ==
- Ochna angustata N. Robson
- Ochna arborea Burch. ex DC.
- Ochna arborea Burch. var oconnorii (Phill.) Du Toit
- Ochna atropurpurea DC.
- Ochna barbertonensis T.Shah
- Ochna barbosae Robson
- Ochna beirensis N. Robson
- Ochna cinnabarina Engl. & Gilg
- Ochna gambleoides N.Robson
- Ochna glauca I. Verd.
- Ochna holstii Engl.
- Ochna inermis Schweinf.
- Ochna natalitia (Meisn.) Walp.
- Ochna polyneura Gilg
- Ochna pretoriensis Phill.
- Ochna puberula N. Robson
- Ochna pulchra Hook.
- Ochna rovumensis Gilg
- Ochna schweinfurthiana F.Hoffm.
- Ochna serrulata (Hochst.) Walp.
- Brackenridgea zanguebarica Oliv.

== Hypericaceae ==
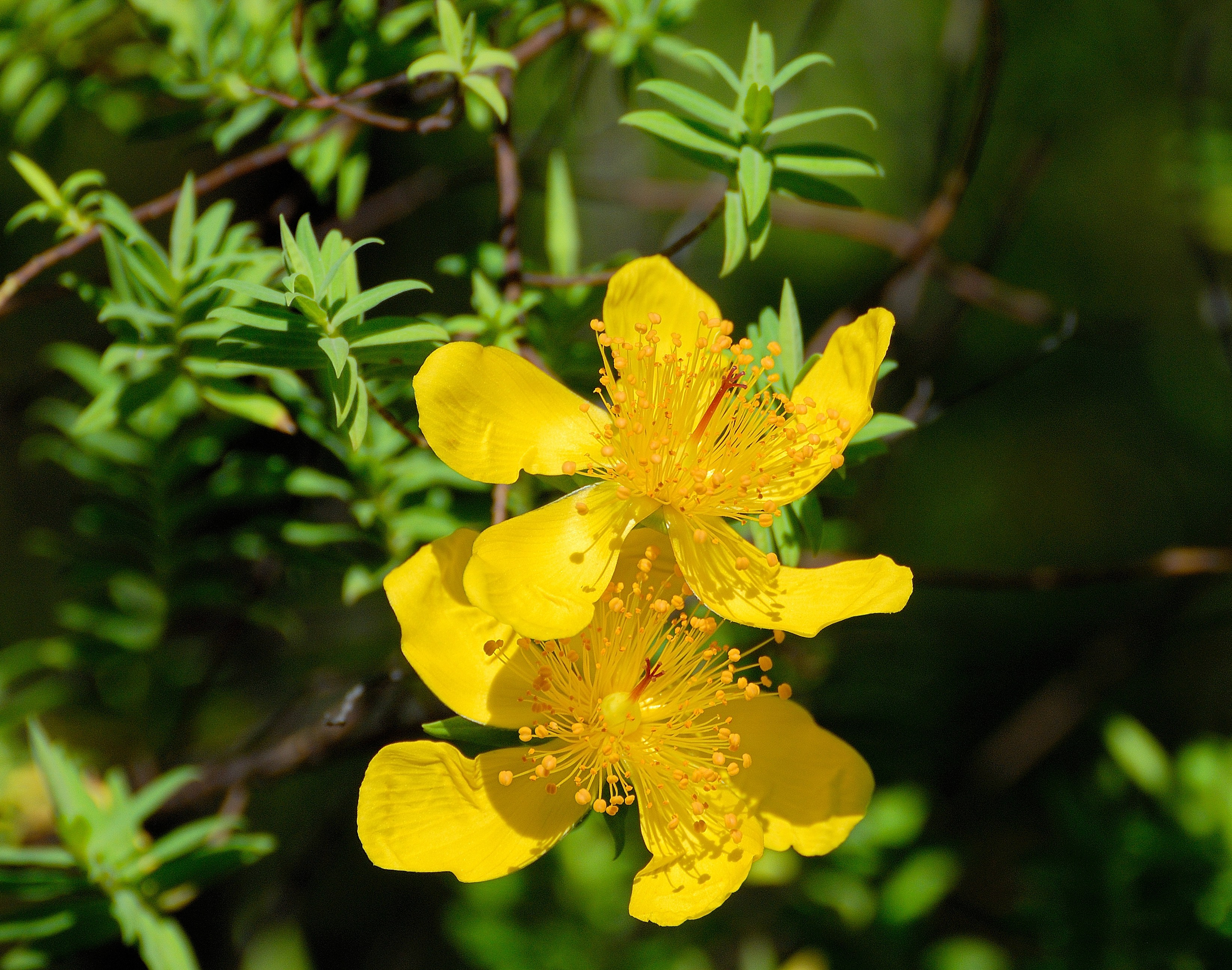
Hypericum revolutum

- Hypericum revolutum Vahl
- Hypericum roeperanum Schimp. ex A. Rich.
- Psorospermum febrifugum Spach

== Clusiaceae (Guttiferae) ==
- Garcinia gerrardii Harv. ex Sim
- Garcinia huillensis Welw.
- Garcinia kingaensis Engl.
- Garcinia livingstonei T. Anders

== Dipterocarpaceae ==
- Monotes engleri Gilg
- Monotes glaber Sprague
- Monotes katangensis (De Wild.) De Wild.

== Tamaricaceae ==
- Tamarix usneoides E. Mey. ex Bunge

== Canellaceae ==
- Warburgia salutaris (Bertol.f.) Chiov.

== Violaceae ==
- Rinorea angustifolia (Thou.) Baill. (Rinorea natalensis Engl.)
- Rinorea arborea (Thouars) Baill.
- Rinorea convallarioides Eyles
- Rinorea domatiosa Van Wyk
- Rinorea elliptica (Oliv.) Kuntze
- Rinorea ferruginea Engl.
- Rinorea ilicifolia (Welw. ex Oliv.) Kuntze

== Achariaceae ==
- Caloncoba suffruticosa (Milne-Redh.) Exell & Sleumer
- Lindackeria fragrans (Gilg) Gilg
- Rawsonia lucida Harv. & Sond.
- Xylotheca kraussiana Hochst.
- Xylotheca tettensis (Klotzsch) Gilg
- Kiggelaria africana L.

== Aphloiaceae ==
- Aphloia theiformis (Vahl) Benn. (Neumannia theiformis (Vahl) A. Rich.)

== Gerrardinaceae ==
- Gerrardina foliosa Oliv.

== Passifloraceae ==
- Adenia digitata (Harv.) Engl.
- Adenia glauca Schinz
- Adenia gummifera (Harv.) Harms
- Adenia hastata (Harv.) Schinz
- Adenia karibaensis W.J.de Wilde
- Adenia pechuelii (Engl.) Harms
- Adenia repanda (Burch.) Engl.
- Adenia spinosa Burtt Davy
- Turnera oculata Story

== Penaeaceae ==
- Olinia chimanimani T. Shah & I. Darbysh.
- Olinia emarginata Burtt Davy
- Olinia radiata J. Hofmeyr & Phill.
- Olinia rochetiana A. Juss.
- Olinia vanguerioides Baker f.
- Olinia ventosa (L.) Cufod.
- Rhynchocalyx lawsonioides Oliv.

== Thymelaeaceae ==
- Peddiea africana Harv.
- Peddiea dregei Meisn.
- Englerodaphne pilosa Burtt Davy
- Englerodaphne subcordata (Meisn.) Engl.
- Passerina falcifolia C.H. Wr.
- Passerina filiformis L.
- Passerina rigida Wikstr.
- Dais cotinifolia L.
- Synaptolepis alternifolia Oliv.
- Synaptolepis kirkii Oliv.

== Lythraceae ==
- Galpinia transvaalica N.E. Br.
- Sonneratia alba Sm.
- Pemphis acidula J.R. Forst. & G. Forst.

== Lecythidaceae ==
- Barringtonia racemosa (L.) Roxb.
- Napoleonaea imperialis P Beauv.

== Rhizophoraceae ==
- Ceriops tagal (Perr.) C.B. Robinson
- Rhizophora mucronata Lam.
- Bruguiera gymnorhiza (L.) Lam.
- Cassipourea euryoides Alston
- Cassipourea flanaganii (Schinz) Alston
- Cassipourea gummiflua Tul.
- Cassipourea malosana (Bak.) Alston
- Cassipourea mossambicensis (v. Brehm.) Alston
- Cassipourea swaziensis Compton

== Combretaceae ==
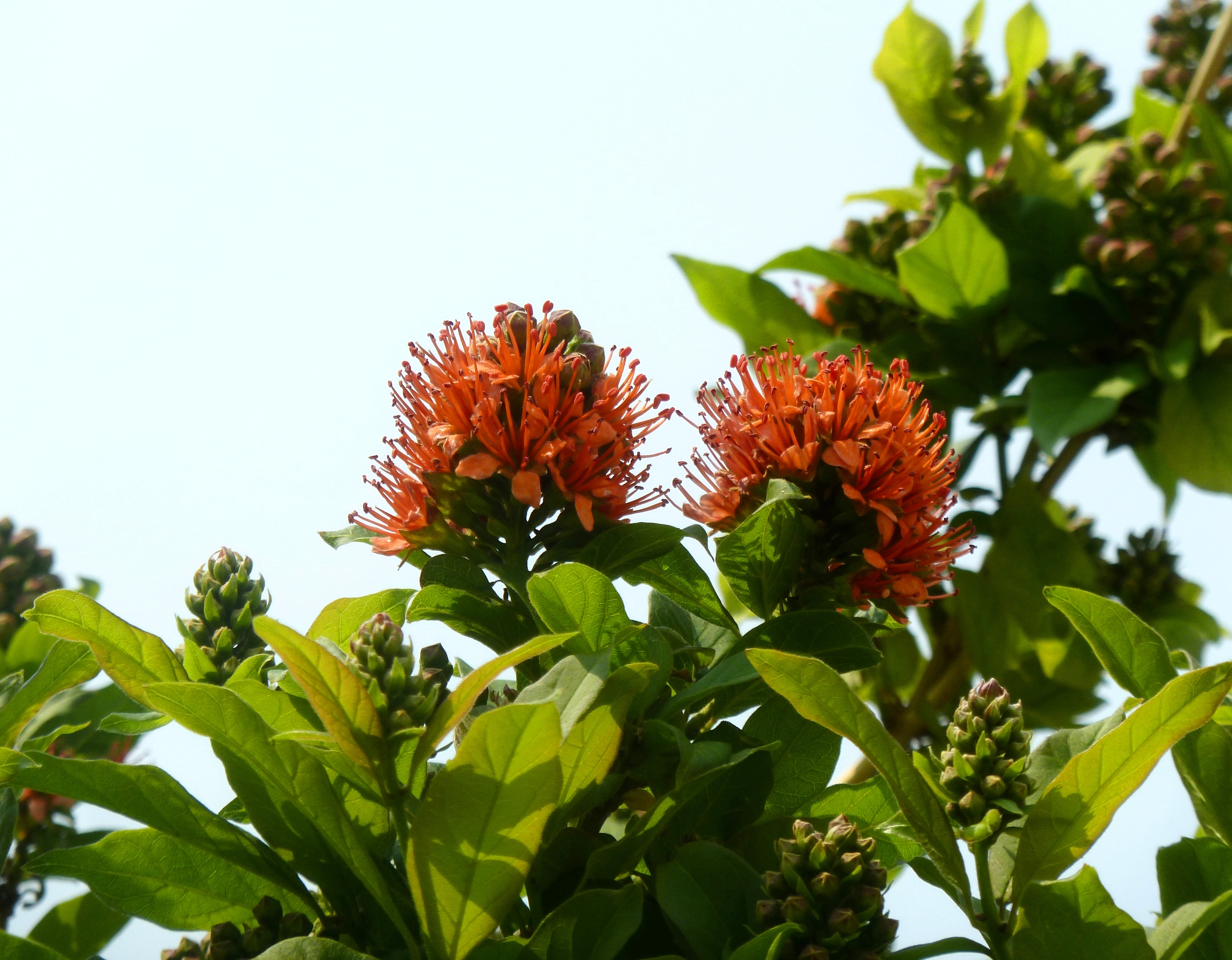
Combretum bracteosum

- Combretum adenogonium Steud. ex A.Rich.
- Combretum albopunctatum Suesseng.
- Combretum apiculatum Sond.
- Combretum apiculatum Sond. var leutweinii (Schinz) Exell
- Combretum bracteosum (Hochst.) Brandis
- Combretum afrum (Eckl. & Zeyh.) Kuntze
- Combretum celastroides Welw. ex Laws.
- Combretum collinum Fresen. subsp. gazense (Swynn. & Bak.f.) Okafor
- Combretum collinum Fresen. subsp. ondongense (Engl. & Diels) Okafor
- Combretum collinum Fresen. subsp. suluense (Engl. & Diels) Okafor
- Combretum collinum Fresen. subsp. taborense (Engl.) Okafor
- Combretum constrictum (Benth.) M.A.Lawson
- Combretum edwardsii Exell
- Combretum elaeagnoides Klotzsch
- Combretum engleri Schinz
- Combretum erythrophyllum (Burch.) Sond.
- Combretum adenogonium Steud. ex A.Rich. (Combretum fragrans F.Hoffm.)
- Combretum hereroense Schinz
- Combretum holstii Engl.

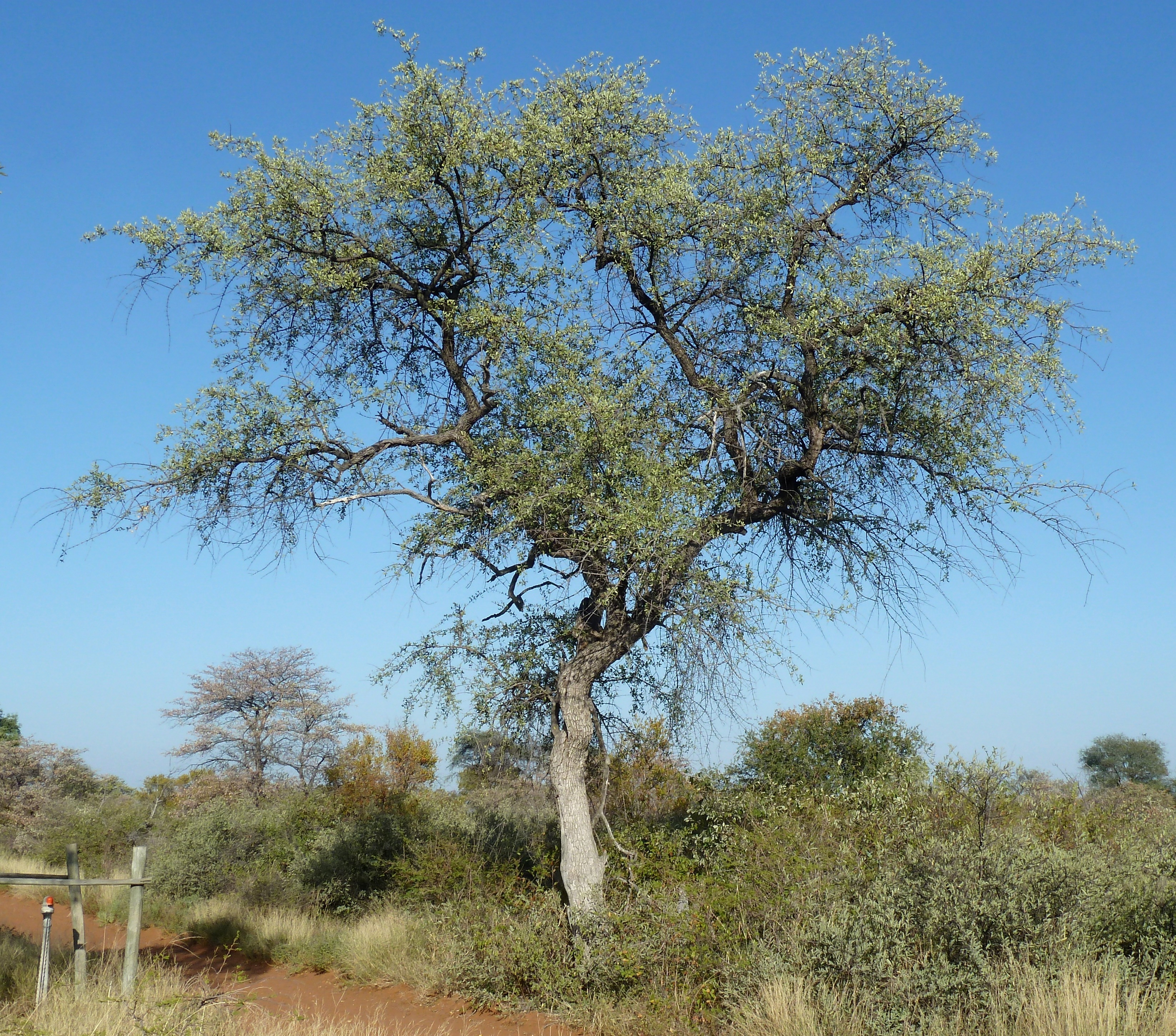
Combretum imberbe

- Combretum imberbe Wawra
- Combretum kirkii M.A.Lawson
- Combretum kraussii Hochst. (Combretum nelsonii Duemmer)
- Combretum microphyllum Klotzsch
- Combretum mkuzense J.D.Carr & Retief
- Combretum moggii Exell
- Combretum molle R. Br. ex G. Don (Combretum holosericeum Sond.)
- Combretum mossambicense (Klotzsch) Engl.
- Combretum obovatum F.Hoffm.
- Combretum oxystachyum Welw. ex M.A.Lawson
- Combretum padoides Engl. & Diels
- Combretum paniculatum Vent.
- Combretum petrophilum Retief
- Combretum pisoniiflorum (Klotzsch) Engl.
- Combretum platypetalum Welw. ex M.A.Lawson
- Combretum psidioides Welw.
- Combretum psidioides Welw. subsp. dinteri (Schinz) Engl.
- Combretum schumannii Engl.
- Combretum vendae A.E.van Wyk var. glabratum N.Hahn
- Combretum vendae Van Wyk var. vendae
- Combretum wattii Exell
- Combretum woodii Duemmer
- Combretum xanthothyrsum Engl. & Diels
- Combretum zeyheri Sond.
- Meiostemon tetrandrus (Exell) Exell & Stace
- Pteleopsis anisoptera (Laws.) Engl. & Diels
- Pteleopsis myrtifolia (Laws.) Engl. & Diels
- Quisqualis parviflora Gerr. ex Harv

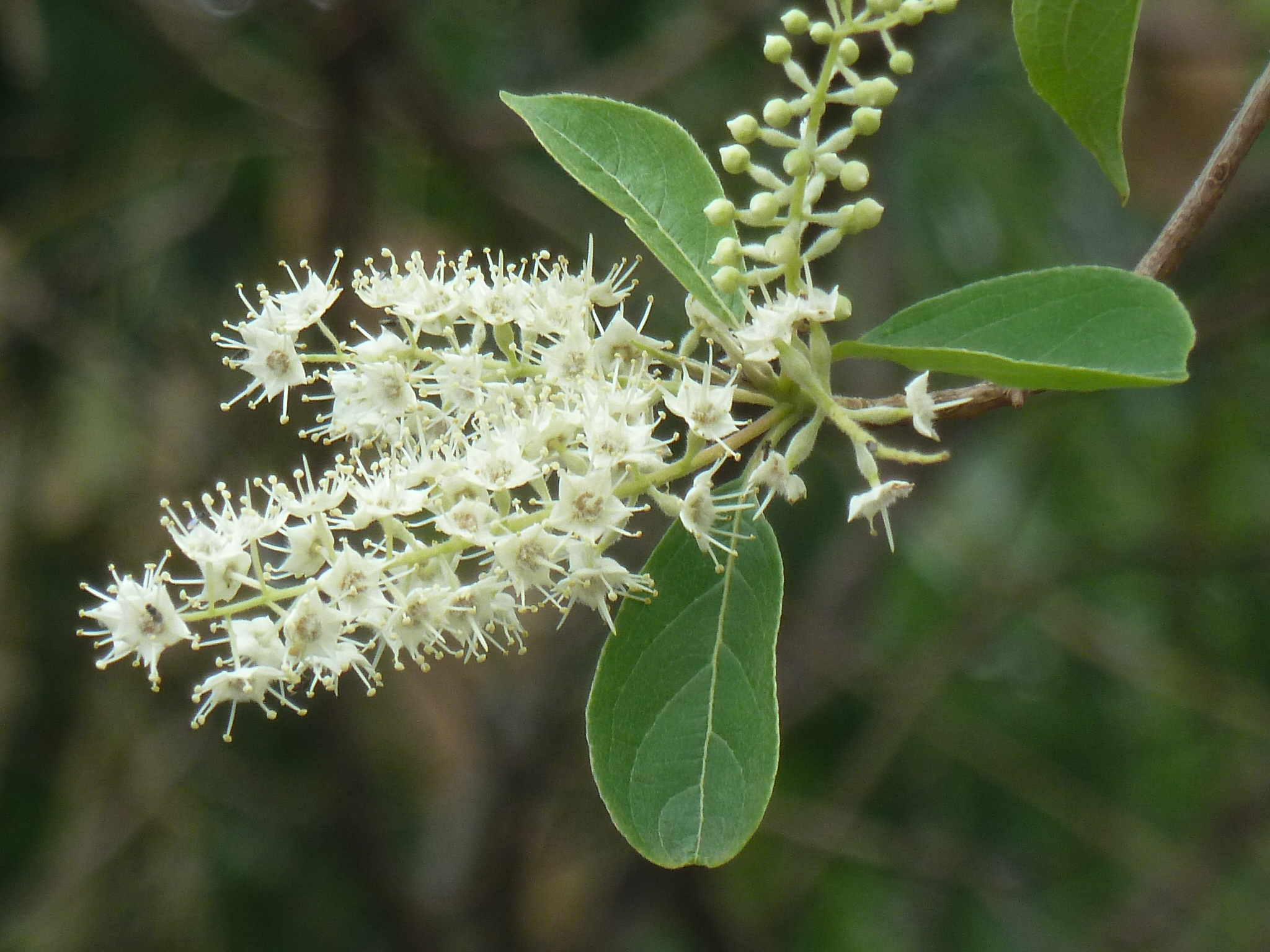
Terminalia phanerophlebia

- Terminalia boivinii Tul.
- Terminalia brachystemma Welw. ex Hiern
- Terminalia gazensis Baker f.
- Terminalia mollis M.A.Lawson
- Terminalia phanerophlebia Engl. & Diels
- Terminalia prunioides Laws.
- Terminalia randii Bak.f.
- Terminalia sambesiaca Engl. & Diels
- Terminalia sericea Burch. ex DC.
- Terminalia stenostachya Engl. & Diels
- Terminalia stuhlmannii Engl.
- Terminalia trichopoda Diels
- Lumnitzera racemosa Willd.

== Myrtaceae ==
- Heteropyxis canescens Oliv.
- Heteropyxis dehniae Suesseng.
- Heteropyxis natalensis Harv.
- Eugenia capensis (Eckl. & Zeyh.) Harv. ex Sond.
- Eugenia capensis subsp. natalitia (Sond.) F.White
- Eugenia capensis subsp. nyassensis (Engl.) F.White
- Eugenia capensis subsp. zeyheri (Harv.) F.White
- Eugenia erythrophylla Strey
- Eugenia simii Dümmer (Eugenia capensis subsp. simii (Dummer) F.White)
- Eugenia verdoorniae A.E. van Wyk
- Eugenia woodii Duemmer
- Eugenia zuluensis Duemmer
- Syzygium cordatum Hochst. (Eugenia cordata (Hochst. ex Krauss) G.Lawson)
- Syzygium gerrardi (Harv. ex Hook.f.) Burtt Davy
- Syzygium guineense (Willd.) DC.
- Syzygium × intermedium Engl. & Brehmer
- Syzygium legatii Burtt Davy & Greenway
- Syzygium owariense (P.Beauv.) Benth. (Eugenia owariensis P.Beauv.)
- Syzygium pondoense Engl.
- Metrosideros angustifolia (L.) J.E. Sm.

== Melastomataceae ==
- Warneckea sansibarica (Taub.) Jacq.-Fél.
- Memecylon bachmannii Engl.
- Memecylon erythranthum Gilg
- Memecylon grandiflorum A.Fern. & R.Fern.
- Memecylon myrianthum Gilg
- Memecylon natalense Markgr.
- Memecylon sansibaricum Taub. var. buchananii (Gilg) R. & A. Fernandes (Memecylon zanzibaricum Taub.)

== Araliaceae ==
- Astropananx volkensii (Harms) Lowry, G.M.Plunkett, Gostel & Frodin
- Cussonia angolensis (Seem.) Hiern
- Cussonia arborea Hochst. ex A.Rich.
- Cussonia arenicola Strey
- Cussonia gamtoosensis Strey
- Cussonia natalensis Sond.
- Cussonia nicholsonii Strey
- Cussonia paniculata Eckl. & Zeyh.
- Cussonia paniculata Eckl. & Zeyh. subsp. sinuata (Reyneke & Kok) De Winter
- Cussonia sphaerocephala Strey
- Cussonia spicata Thunb.
- Cussonia thyrsiflora Thunb.
- Cussonia transvaalensis Reyneke
- Cussonia zuluensis Strey
- Neocussonia umbellifera (Sond.) Hutch.
- Polyscias fulva (Hiern) Harms
- Seemannaralia gerrardii (Seemann) Vig.

== Apiaceae (Umbelliferae) ==
- Heteromorpha arborescens (Spreng.) Cham. & Schltdl.
- Heteromorpha papillosa C.C.Towns.
- Heteromorpha stenophylla Welw. ex Schinz
- Heteromorpha trifoliata (Wendl.) Eckl. & Zeyh.
- Steganotaenia araliacea Hochst.

== Curtisiaceae ==
- Curtisia dentata (Burm.f.) C.A. Sm.

== Cornaceae ==
- Cornus volkensii Harms (Afrocrania volkensii (Harms) Hutch.)

== Ericaceae ==
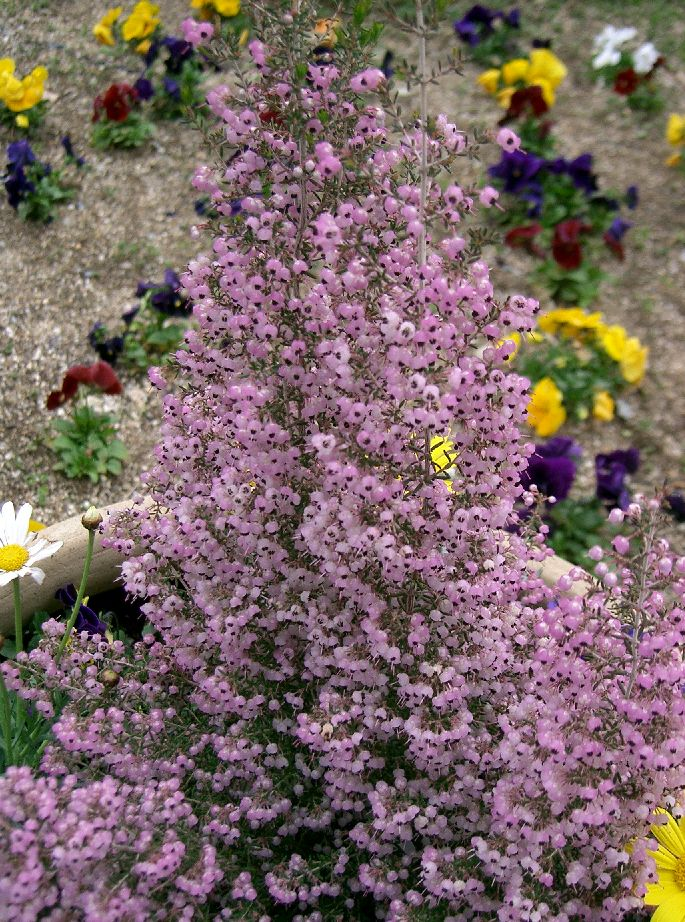
Erica canaliculata

- Vaccinium exul H. Bol.
- Erica benguelensis (Welw. ex Engl.) E.G.H.Oliv. (Philippia benguellensis (Welw. ex Engl.) Britten)
- Erica afra L.
- Erica afrorum H. Bol.
- Erica canaliculata Andrews
- Erica caterviflora Salisb.
- Erica hexandra (S.Moore) E.G.H.Oliv. (Philippia hexandra S. Moore)
- Erica inconstans Zahlbr.
- Erica mannii (Hook.f.) Beentje (Philippia pallidiflora Engl.)
- Erica pleiotricha S.Moore (Erica thryptomenoides S.Moore)
- Erica simii (S. Moore) E.G.H. Oliver (Erica drakensbergensis L.Guthrie & Bolus)
- Erica triflora L.
- Erica tristis Bartl.
- Philippia chamissonis Klotzsch
- Philippia simii S. Moore

== Myrsinaceae ==
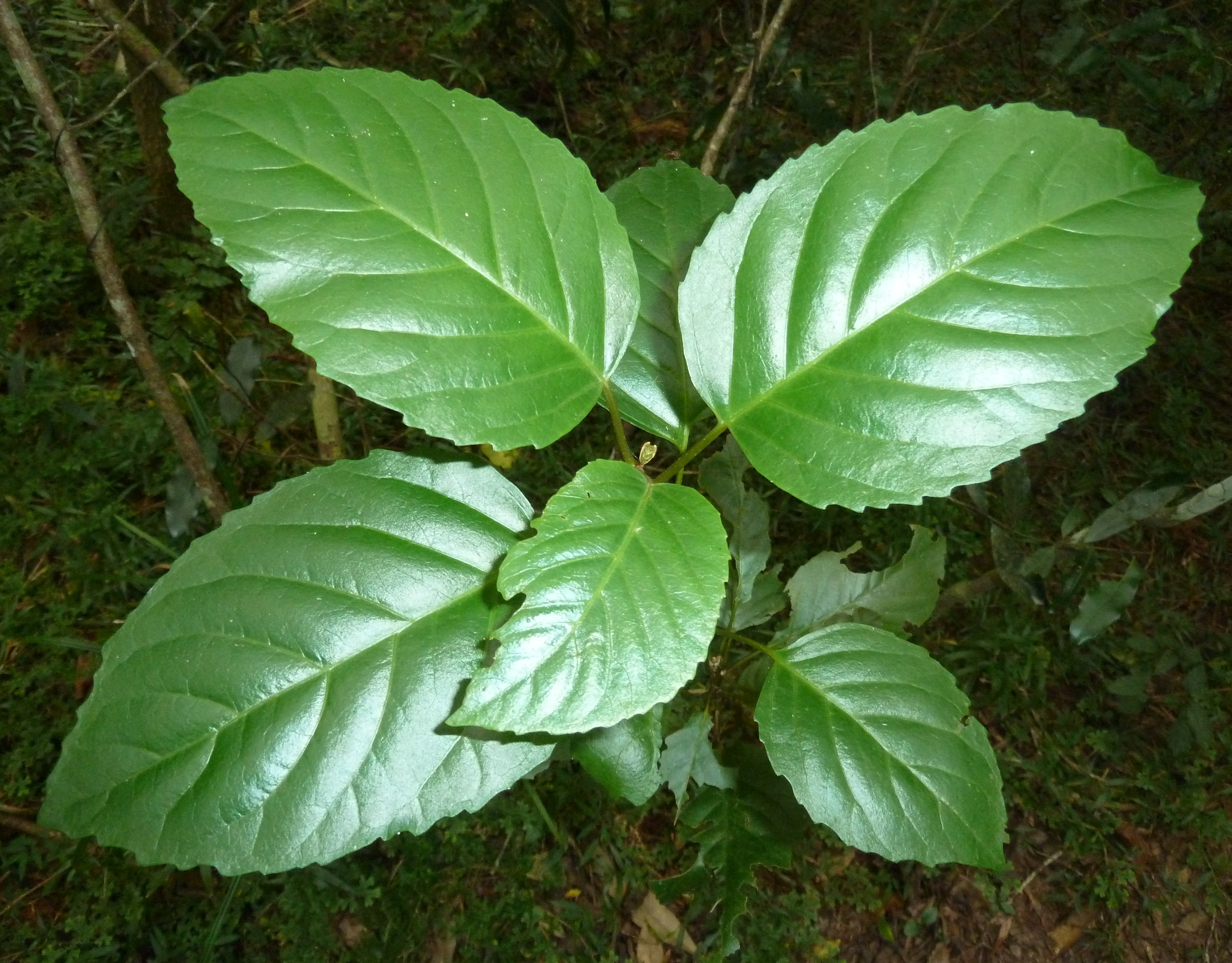
Maesa lanceolata

- Maesa lanceolata Forssk.
- Myrsine africana L.
- Myrsine pillansii Adamson
- Rapanea gilliana (Sond.) Mez
- Rapanea melanophloeos (L.) Mez

== Sapotaceae ==
- Aningeria adolfi-friederici (Engl.) Robyns & Gilbert) (Pouteria adolfi-friederici (Engl.) A.Meeuse)
- Donella viridifolia (J.M.Wood & Franks) Aubrév. & Pellegr.
- Englerophytum magalismontanum (Sond.) T.D.Penn. (Bequaertiodendron magalismontanum (Sond.) Heine & Hemsl.)
- Englerophytum natalense (Sond.) T.D.Penn.
- Gambeya gorungosana (Engl.) Liben
- Inhambanella henriquesii (Engl. & Warb.) Dubard
- Manilkara concolor (Harv. ex C.H. Wr.) Gerstn.
- Manilkara discolor (Sond.) J.H. Hemsl.
- Manilkara mochisia (Bak.) Dubard
- Manilkara nicholsonii Van Wyk
- Mimusops afra E. Mey. ex A. DC.
- Mimusops fruticosa A. DC.
- Mimusops obovata Sond.
- Mimusops obtusifolia Lam.
- Mimusops zeyheri Sond.
- Sideroxylon inerme L.
- Synsepalum brevipes (Baker) T.D.Penn. (Pachystela brevipes (Baker) Baill. ex Engl.)
- Synsepalum kassneri (Engl.) T.D.Penn. (Tulestea kassneri (Engl.) Aubrév.)
- Vitellariopsis dispar (N.E. Br.) Aubrév.
- Vitellariopsis marginata (N.E. Br.) Aubrév. (Vitellariopsis sylvestris (S.Moore) Aubrév.)

== Ebenaceae ==
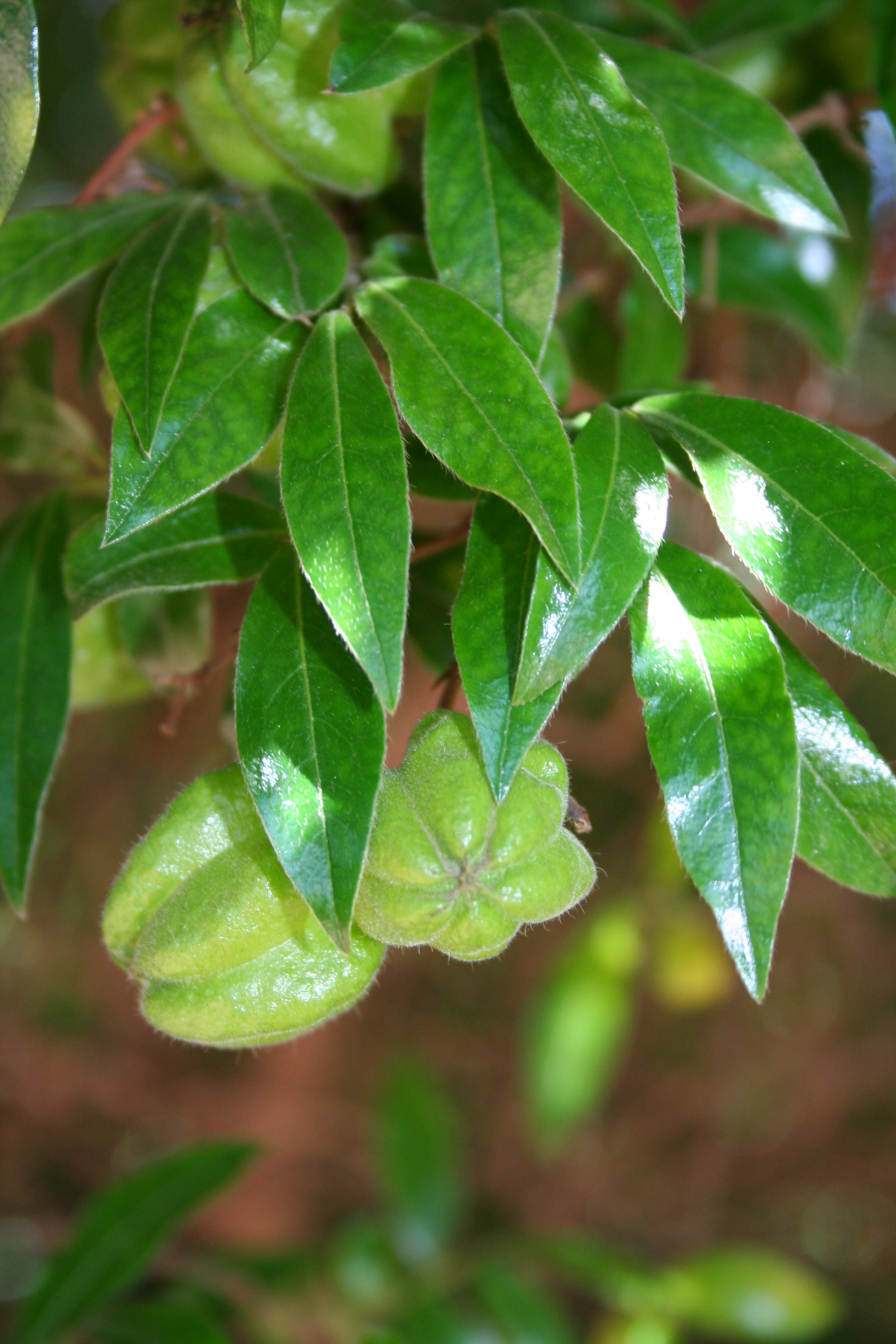
Diospyros whyteana

- Euclea asperrima E.Holzh.
- Euclea coriacea A. DC.
- Euclea crispa (Thunb.) Guerke
- Euclea crispa (Thunb.) Guerke subsp. linearis (Zeyh. ex Hiern) F.White
- Euclea crispa (Thunb.) Guerke subsp. ovata (Burch.) F.White
- Euclea divinorum Hiern
- Euclea natalensis A. DC.
- Euclea natalensis A. DC. subsp. capensis F. White
- Euclea natalensis A. DC. subsp. rotundifolia F. White
- Euclea pseudebenus E. Mey ex A. DC.
- Euclea racemosa L.
- Euclea racemosa L. subsp. daphnoides (Hiern) F.White
- Euclea racemosa subsp. schimperi (A.DC.) F.White (Euclea schimperi (A.DC.) Dandy)
- Euclea tomentosa E. Mey. ex A. DC.
- Euclea undulata Thunb. (Euclea undulata var. myrtina (Burch.) Hiern)
- Diospyros abyssinica (Hiern) F.White
- Diospyros acocksii (De Winter) De Winter
- Diospyros batocana Hiern
- Diospyros chamaethamnus Mildbr.
- Diospyros dichrophylla (Gand.) De Winter
- Diospyros galpinii (Hiern) De Winter
- Diospyros glabra (L.) De Winter
- Diospyros inhacaensis F. White
- Diospyros loureiroana G.Don (Diospyros usambarensis F.White)
- Diospyros lycioides Desf.
- Diospyros lycioides Desf. subsp. guerkei (Kuntze) De Winter
- Diospyros lycioides Desf. subsp. sericea (Bernh.) De Winter
- Diospyros mespiliformis Hochst. ex A. DC.
- Diospyros natalensis (Harv.) Brenan
- Diospyros natalensis (Harv.) Brenan subsp. nummularia (Brenan) F. White
- Diospyros pallens (Thunb.) F.White (Royena pallens Thunb.)
- Diospyros quiloensis (Hiern) F.White
- Diospyros ramulosa (E.Mey. ex A.DC.) De Winter
- Diospyros rotundifolia Hiern
- Diospyros scabrida (Harv. ex Hiern) De Winter
- Diospyros senensis Klotzsch
- Diospyros simii (Kuntze) De Winter
- Diospyros squarrosa Klotzsch
- Diospyros vera (Lour.) A.Chev. (Diospyros ferrea (Willd.) Bakh.)
- Diospyros villosa (L.) De Winter
- Diospyros virgata (Gürke) Brenan
- Diospyros whyteana (Hiern) F. White

== Oleaceae ==
- Schrebera alata (Hochst.) Welw. (Schrebera mazoensis S.Moore)
- Schrebera trichoclada Welw.
- Chionanthus battiscombei (Hutch.) Stearn (Linociera battiscombei Hutch.)
- Chionanthus foveolatus (E. Mey.) Stearn (Linociera foveolata (E.Mey.) Knobl.)
- Chionanthus foveolatus (E. Mey.) Stearn subsp. major (Verdoorn) Stearn
- Chionanthus foveolatus (E. Mey.) Stearn subsp. tomentellus (Verdoorn) Stearn
- Chionanthus peglerae (C.H. Wr.) Stearn
- Olea europaea subsp. cuspidata (Wall. ex G. Don) Cif. (Olea africana Mill.)
- Olea capensis L.
- Olea capensis L. subsp. enervis (Harv. ex C.H. Wr.) Verdoorn
- Olea capensis L. subsp. macrocarpa (C.H. Wr.) Verdoorn
- Olea exasperata Jacq.
- Olea woodiana Knobl.
- Jasminum stenolobum Rolfe

== Salvadoraceae ==
- Salvadora angustifolia Turrell var. australis (Schweick.) Verdoorn
- Salvadora persica L.
- Azima tetracantha Lam.

== Loganiaceae ==
- Strychnos cocculoides Bak.
- Strychnos decussata (Pappe) Gilg
- Strychnos henningsii Gilg
- Strychnos innocua Delile
- Strychnos madagascariensis Poir.
- Strychnos mellodora S. Moore
- Strychnos mitis S. Moore
- Strychnos potatorum L.f.
- Strychnos pungens Solered.
- Strychnos spinosa Lam.
- Strychnos usambarensis Gilg ex Engl.

== Gentianaceae ==
- Anthocleista grandiflora Gilg

== Stilbaceae ==
- Halleria elliptica L.
- Halleria lucida L.
- Halleria ovata Benth.
- Nuxia congesta R. Br. ex Fresen. (Lachnopylis sambesina (Gilg) C.A.Sm.)
- Nuxia floribunda Benth.
- Nuxia glomerulata (C.A. Sm.) Verdoorn
- Nuxia oppositifolia (Hochst.) Benth.
- Anastrabe integerrima E.Mey. ex Benth.
- Bowkeria cymosa MacOwan
- Bowkeria verticillata (Eckl. & Zeyh.) Druce

== Apocynaceae ==
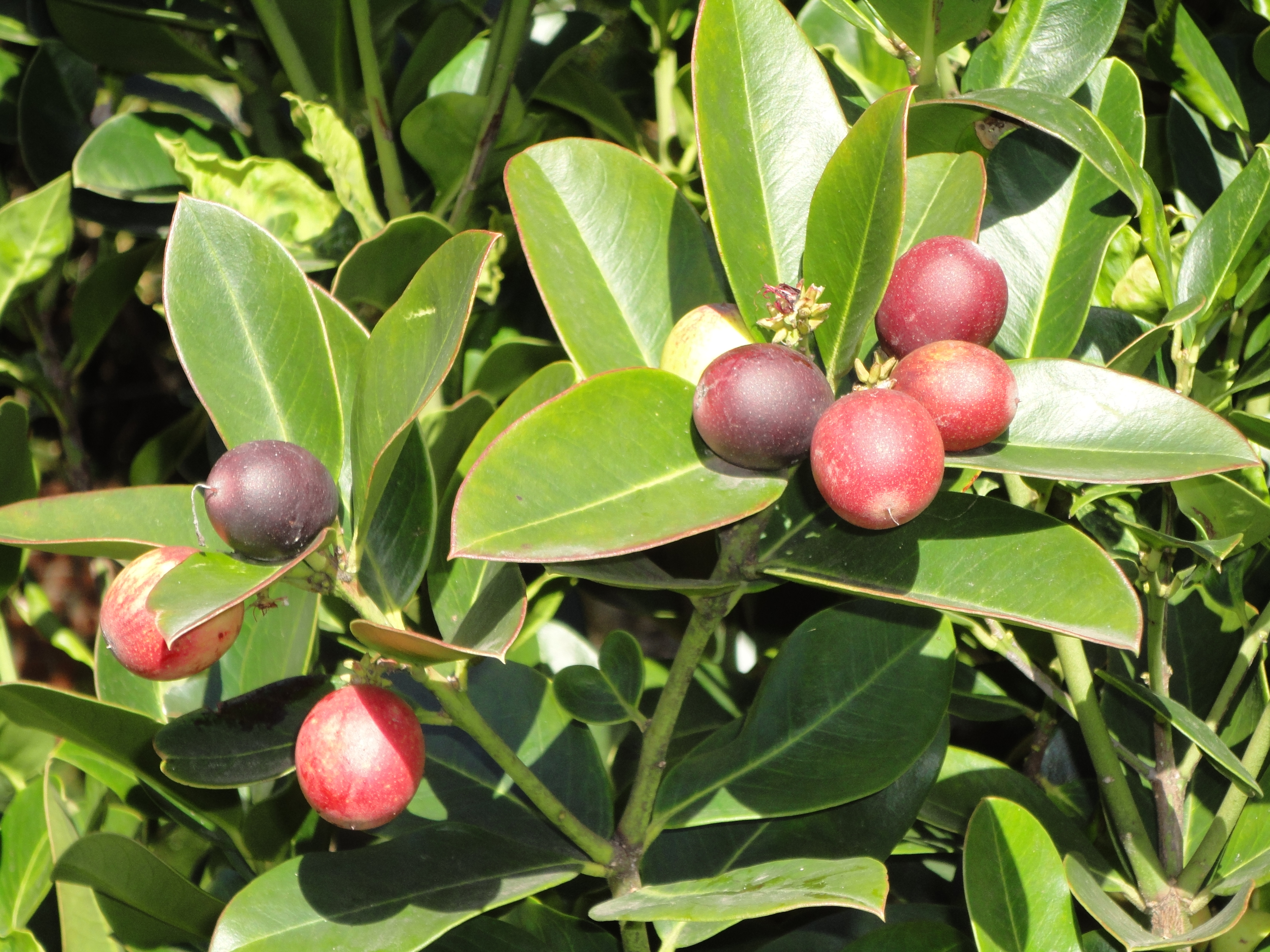
Acokanthera oppositifolia

- Landolphia capensis Oliv.
- Landolphia kirkii Dyer
- Saba comorensis (Bojer ex A.DC.) Pichon (Landolphia comorensis (Bojer ex A.DC.) K.Schum.)
- Acokanthera oblongifolia (Hochst.) Codd
- Acokanthera oppositifolia (Lam.) Codd
- Acokanthera rotundata (Codd) Kupicha
- Acokanthera schimperi (A.DC.) Schweinf.
- Carissa bispinosa (L.) Desf. ex Brenan (Carissa bispinosa var. acuminata (E.Mey.) Codd) (Carissa wyliei N.E.Br.)
- Carissa haematocarpa (Eckl.) A. DC.
- Carissa macrocarpa (Eckl.) A. DC.
- Carissa spinarum L. (Carissa edulis (Forssk.) Vahl)
- Pleiocarpa pycnantha (K.Schum.) Stapf
- Gonioma kamassi E. Mey
- Holarrhena pubescens (Buch.-Ham.) Wall.
- Diplorhynchus condylocarpon (Muell. Arg.) Pichon (Diplorhynchus mossambicensis Benth.)
- Tabernaemontana elegans Stapf
- Tabernaemontana pachysiphon Stapf (Tabernaemontana angolensis Stapf)
- Tabernaemontana ventricosa Hochst. ex A. DC.
- Ephippiocarpa orientalis (S. Moore) Markgr.
- Voacanga africana Stapf ex Scott-Elliot (Voacanga schweinfurthii Stapf)
- Voacanga thouarsii Roem. & Schult.
- Rauvolfia afra Sond. (Rauvolfia inebrians K.Schum.)
- Baissea wulfhorstii Schinz
- Oncinotis inandensis Wood & Evans
- Hunteria zeylanica (Retz.) Gardner ex Thwaites
- Mascarenhasia arborescens A.DC.
- Funtumia africana (Benth.) Stapf
- Strophanthus amboensis (Schinz) Engl. & Pax
- Strophanthus courmontii Sacleux ex Franch.
- Strophanthus gerrardii Stapf
- Strophanthus kombe Oliv.
- Strophanthus petersianus Klotzsch

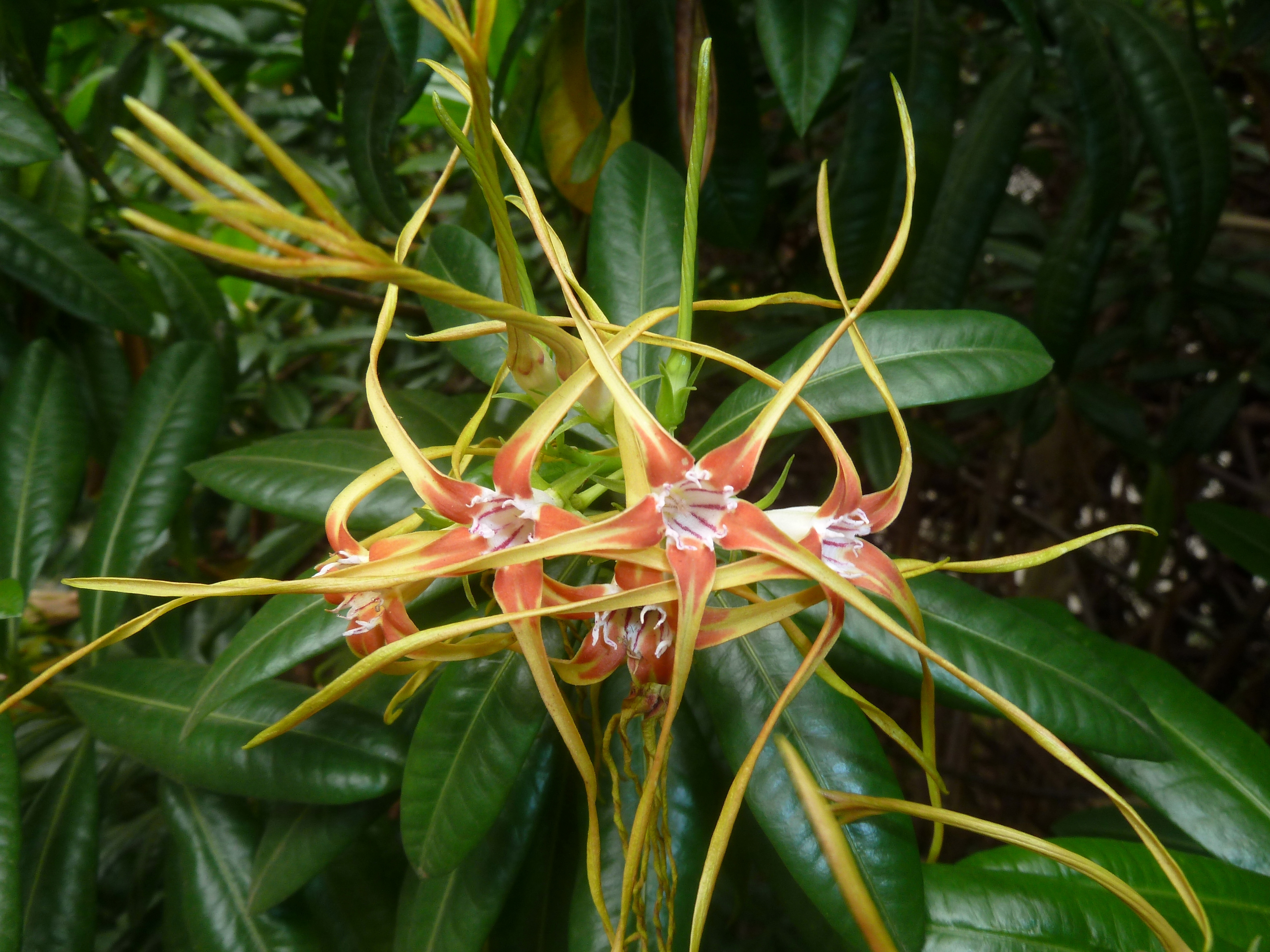
Strophanthus speciosus

- Strophanthus speciosus (Ward & Harv.) Reber
- Adenium boehmianum Schinz
- Adenium multiflorum Klotzsch
- Adenium obesum (Forssk.) Roem. & Schult.
- Pachypodium lealii Welw.
- Pachypodium namaquanum (Wyley ex Harv.) Welw.
- Wrightia natalensis Stapf
- Cryptolepis decidua (Planch. ex Hook.f. & Benth.) N.E.Br.
- Ectadium latifolium (Schinz) N.E.Br.
- Ectadium rotundifolium (H.Huber) Venter & Kotze
- Ectadium virgatum E.Mey.
- Fockea multiflora K.Schum.
- Gomphocarpus fruticosus (L.) W.T.Aiton
- Gomphocarpus tomentosus Burch.
- Tacazzea apiculata Oliv.
- Mondia whitei (Hook.f.) Skeels

== Convolvulaceae ==
- Ipomoea adenioides Schinz
- Ipomoea shirambensis Baker
- Ipomoea verbascoidea Choisy

== Boraginaceae ==
- Cordia africana Lam.
- Cordia afra Sond.
- Cordia goetzei Gürke
- Cordia grandicalyx Oberm.
- Cordia monoica Roxb.
- Cordia ovalis R. Br.
- Cordia pilosissima Bak.
- Cordia sinensis Lam.
- Cordia stuhlmannii Gürke
- Cordia torrei E.S.Martins
- Ehretia alba Retief & A.E.van Wyk
- Ehretia amoena Klotzsch
- Ehretia coerulea Gürke
- Ehretia cymosa Thonn.
- Ehretia namibiensis Retief & A.E.van Wyk
- Ehretia obtusifolia Hochst. ex DC.
- Ehretia rigida (Thunb.) Druce
- Lobostemon belliformis Buys
- Heliotropium foertherianum Diane & Hilger

== Verbenaceae ==
- Lantana angolensis Moldenke
- Lantana camara L.
- Lantana dinteri Moldenke
- Lantana rugosa Thunb.

== Lamiaceae ==
- Premna mooiensis (H. Pearson) Pieper
- Premna senensis Klotzsch
- Vitex angolensis Gürke
- Vitex buchananii Baker ex Gürke
- Vitex doniana Sweet
- Vitex ferruginea Schumach. & Thonn. (Vitex amboniensis Gürke)
- Vitex harveyana H.H.W. Pearson
- Vitex madiensis Oliv.
- Vitex mombassae Vatke
- Vitex obovata E. Mey. (Vitex wilmsii Gürke)
- Vitex payos (Lour.) Merr. (Vitex isotjensis Gibbs)
- Vitex petersiana Klotzsch (Vitex kirkii Baker)
- Vitex pooara Corbishley
- Vitex rehmannii Guerke
- Vitex zeyheri Sond. ex Schauer
- Clerodendrum umbellatum Poir.
- Rotheca myricoides (Hochst.) Steane & Mabb. (Clerodendrum myricoides (Hochst.) Vatke)<
- Rotheca wildii (Moldenke) R. Fern.
- Volkameria eriophylla (Gürke) Mabb. & Y.W.Yuan (Clerodendrum eriophyllum Gürke)
- Volkameria glabra (E.Mey.) Mabb. & Y.W.Yuan (Clerodendrum glabrum E. Mey.)
- Karomia speciosa (Hutch. & Corbishley) R.Fern. (Holmskioldia speciosa Hutch. & Corb.)
- Tetradenia riparia (Hochst.) Codd
- Tinnea rhodesiana S.Moore
- Syncolostemon albiflorus (N.E.Br.) D.F.Otieno (Hemizygia albiflora (N.E.Br.) Ashby)
- Syncolostemon flabellifolius (S.Moore) A.J.Paton (Hemizygia flabellifolia S.Moore)
- Hemizygia obermeyerae Ashby
- Hoslundia opposita Vahl

== Solanaceae ==
- Datura ferox L.
- Datura innoxia Mill.
- Datura stramonium L.
- Lycium afrum L.
- Lycium bosciifolium Schinz
- Lycium cinereum Thunb.
- Lycium decumbens Welw. ex Hiern
- Lycium eenii S. Moore
- Lycium ferocissimum Miers
- Lycium grandicalyx Joubert & Venter
- Lycium hirsutum Dunal
- Lycium oxycarpum Dunal
- Lycium persicum Miers
- Lycium prunus-spinosa Dunal
- Lycium villosum Schinz
- Solanum aculeastrum Dunal
- Solanum giganteum Jacq.
- Nicotiana glauca Graham
- Withania somnifera (L.) Dunal

== Scrophulariaceae ==
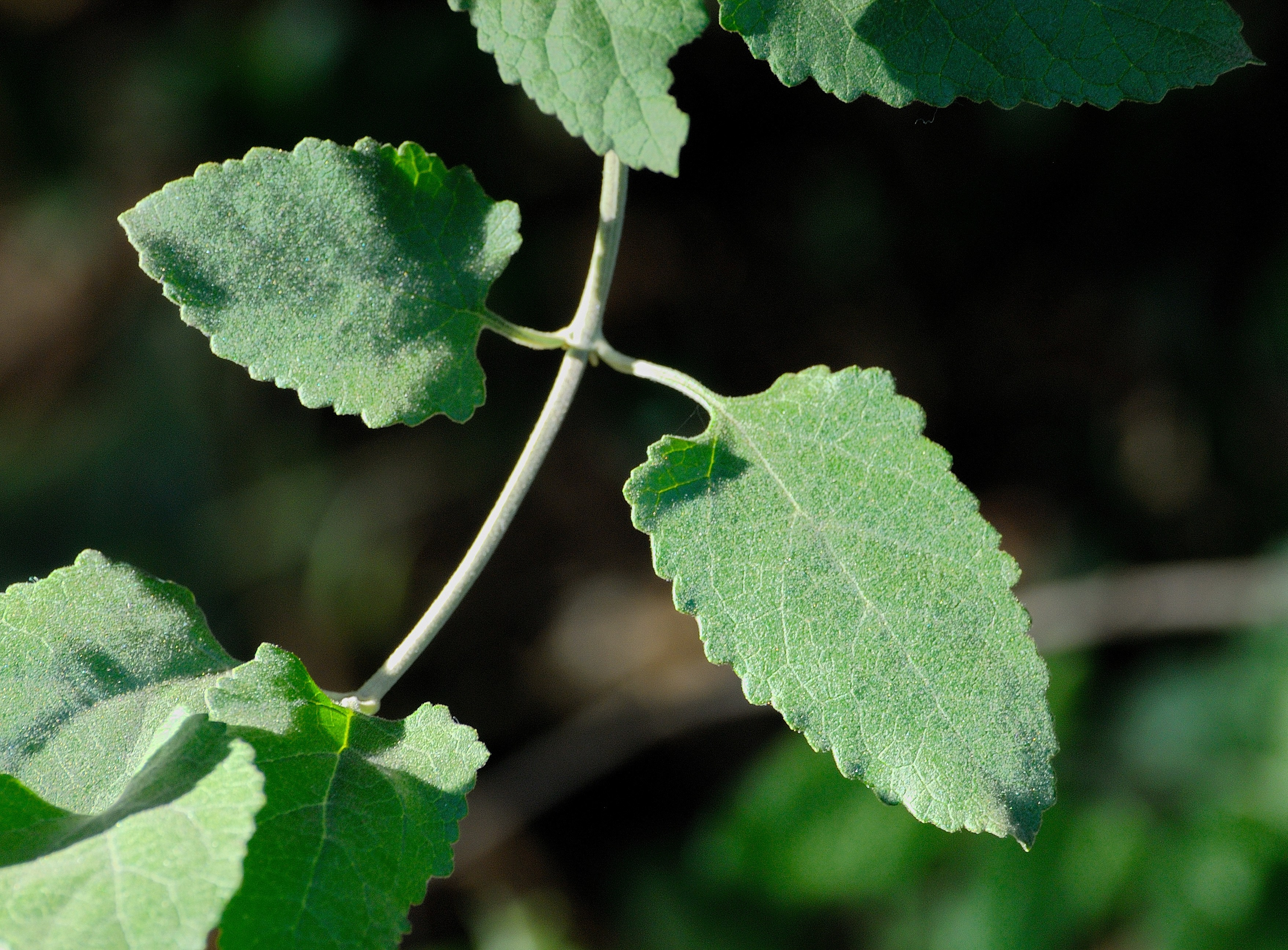
Buddleja dysophylla

- Buddleja auriculata Benth.
- Buddleja dysophylla (Benth.) Radlk.
- Buddleja glomerata H.L.Wendl.
- Buddleja loricata Leeuwenb. (Buddleja corrugata (Benth.) Phillips)
- Buddleja pulchella N.E. Br.
- Buddleja saligna Willd.
- Buddleja salviifolia (L.) Lam.
- Freylinia lanceolata (L.f.) G. Don
- Freylinia tropica S. Moore
- Antherothamnus pearsonii N.E.Br.
- Manuleopsis dinteri Thell. ex Schinz
- Jamesbrittenia ramosissima (Hiern) Hilliard

== Bignoniaceae ==
- Podranea brycei (N.E.Br.) Sprague
- Podranea ricasoliana (Tanf.) Sprague
- Tecoma capensis (Thunb.) Lindl. (Tecomaria capensis (Thunb.) Spach)
- Rhigozum brevispinosum Kuntze
- Rhigozum obovatum Burch.
- Rhigozum trichotomum Burch.
- Rhigozum virgatum Merxm. & A.Schreib.
- Rhigozum zambesiacum Bak.
- Markhamia obtusifolia (Baker) Sprague
- Markhamia zanzibarica (Bojer ex DC.) K.Schum. (Markhamia acuminata (Klotzsch) K. Schum.)
- Kigelia africana (Lam.) Benth.
- Fernandoa abbreviata Bidgood
- Fernandoa ferdinandi (Welw.) Baill. ex K.Schum.
- Fernandoa magnifica Seem.
- Catophractes alexandri D.Don
- Stereospermum kunthianum Cham.
- Dolichandrone alba (Sim) Sprague

== Pedaliaceae ==
- Sesamothamnus benguellensis Welw.
- Sesamothamnus guerichii (Engl.) E.A. Bruce
- Sesamothamnus lugardii N.E. Br.
- Sesamum rigidum Peyr.

== Acanthaceae ==
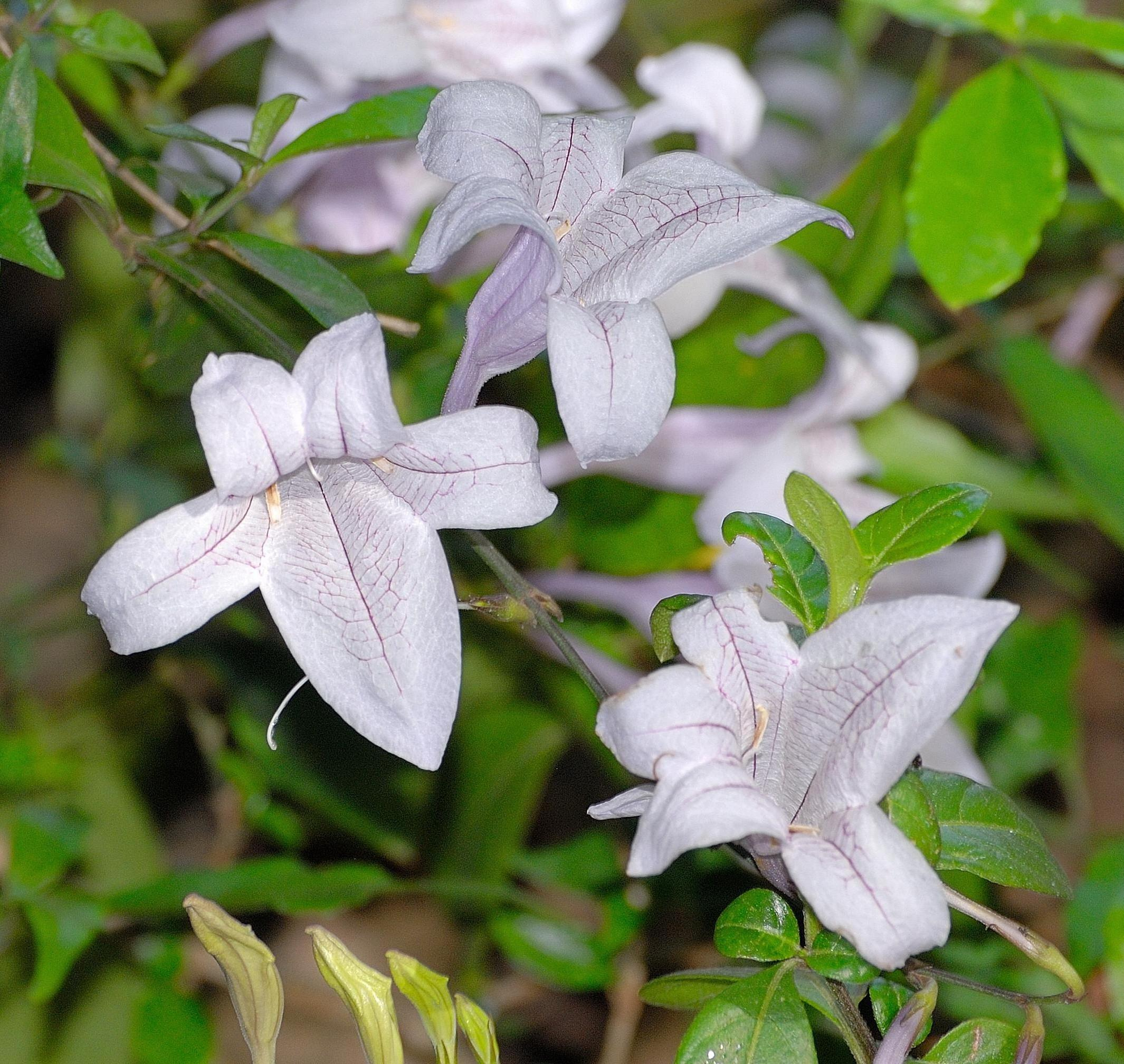
Mackaya bella

- Monechma genistifolium C.B.Clarke
- Monechma tonsum P.G. Mey.
- Sclerochiton harveyanus Nees
- Sclerochiton kirkii (T. Anderson) C.B. Clarke
- Barleria prionitis L.
- Mackaya bella Harv.
- Thunbergia crispa Burkill
- Justicia adhatodoides (Nees) V.A.W.Graham (Duvernoia adhatodoides E. Mey. ex Nees)
- Petalidium englerianum C.B.Clarke
- Petalidium luteo-album A.Meeuse
- Avicennia marina (Forssk.) Vierh.
- Anisotes sessiliflorus (T.Anderson) C.B.Clarke
- Ruspolia hypocrateriformis (Vahl) Milne-Redh.

== Rubiaceae ==
- Nauclea diderrichii (De Wild.) Merr.
- Sherbournia bignoniiflora (Welw.) Hua
- Stipularia africana P.Beauv.
- Amphiasma benguellense (Hiern) Bremek.
- Amphiasma merenskyanum Bremek.
- Hymenodictyon floribundum (Hochst. & Steud.) B.L.Rob.
- Hymenodictyon parvifolium Oliv.
- Crossopteryx febrifuga (Afzel. ex G. Don) Benth.
- Breonadia salicina (Vahl) Hepper & Wood (Adina microcephala (Delile) Hiern)
- Cephalanthus natalensis Oliv.
- Pauridiantha symplocoides (S.Moore) Bremek.
- Leptactina benguelensis (Welw. ex Benth. & Hook.f.) R.D.Good
- Leptactina platyphylla (Hiern) Wernham (Leptactina hexamera K.Schum.)
- Tarenna junodii (Schinz) Bremek.
- Tarenna luteola (Stapf) Bremek.
- Tarenna pallidula Hiern (Tarenna laurentii (De Wild.) J.G.García)
- Tarenna pavettoides (Harv.) Sim
- Coptosperma littorale (Hiern) Degreef (Tarenna littoralis (Hiern) Bridson)
- Coptosperma neurophyllum (S.Moore) Degreef (Tarenna neurophylla (S.Moore) Bremek.)
- Coptosperma rhodesiacum (Bremek.) Degreef (Tarenna zimbabwensis Bridson)
- Coptosperma supra-axillare (Hemsl.) Degreef (Tarenna supra-axillaris (Hemsl.) Bremek.)(Tarenna barbertonensis (Bremek.) Bremek.)
- Coptosperma zygoon (Bridson) Degreef
- Burchellia bubalina (L.f.) Sims.
- Catunaregam obovata (Hochst.) A.E.Gonç.
- Catunaregam pentandra (Gürke) Bridson
- Catunaregam spinosa (Thunb.) Tirveng.
- Catunaregam stenocarpa Bridson
- Catunaregam swynnertonii (S.Moore) Bridson (Randia swynnertonii S.Moore)
- Catunaregam taylorii (S.Moore) Bridson
- Coddia rudis (E. Mey. ex Harv.) Verdc. (Xeromphis rudis (E.Mey. ex Harv.) Codd)
- Mitriostigma axillare Hochst.
- Hyperacanthus amoenus (Sims.) Bridson (Gardenia amoena Sims)
- Gardenia cornuta Hemsl.
- Gardenia imperialis K.Schum.
- Gardenia posoquerioides S.Moore
- Gardenia resiniflua Hiern
- Gardenia ternifolia Schum. & Thonn. subsp. jovis-tonantis (Welw.) Verdc. (Gardenia jovis-tonantis (Welw.) Hiern)
- Gardenia thunbergia L.f.
- Gardenia volkensii K. Schum.
- Gardenia volkensii K. Schum. subsp. spathulifolia (Stapf & Hutch.) Verdc.
- Rothmannia capensis Thunb.
- Rothmannia engleriana (K.Schum.) Keay
- Rothmannia fischeri (K. Schum.) Bullock
- Rothmannia globosa (Hochst.) Keay
- Rothmannia manganjae (Hiern) Keay
- Rothmannia urcelliformis (Hiern) Bullock ex Robyns
- Rothmannia whitfieldii (Lindl.) Dandy
- Didymosalpinx norae (Swynn.) Keay
- Oxyanthus latifolius Sond.
- Oxyanthus pyriformis (Hochst.) Skeels
- Oxyanthus speciosus DC. subsp. gerrardii (Sond.) Bridson
- Feretia aeruginescens Stapf
- Tricalysia angolensis A.Rich. ex DC.
- Tricalysia capensis (Meisn.) Sim
- Tricalysia congesta (Oliv.) Hiern
- Tricalysia coriacea subsp. nyassae (Hiern) Bridson (Tricalysia nyassae Hiern)
- Tricalysia jasminiflora (Klotzsch) Benth. & Hook.f. ex Hiern (Neorosea jasminiflora (Klotzsch) N.Hallé)
- Empogona coriacea (Sond.) Tosh & Robbr. (Tricalysia sonderiana Hiern)
- Empogona kirkii Hook.f. (Tricalysia allenii (Stapf) Brenan)
- Empogona kirkii subsp. junodii (Schinz) Tosh & Robbr. (Tricalysia junodii (Schinz) Brenan)
- Empogona lanceolata (Sond.) Tosh & Robbr. (Tricalysia lanceolata (Sond.) Burtt Davy)
- Kraussia floribunda Harv.
- Sericanthe andongensis (Hiern) Robbr. (Neorosea andongensis (Hiern) N.Hallé) (Tricalysia pachystigma K.Schum.)
- Heinsia crinita (Afzel.) G.Taylor
- Heinsenia diervilleoides K.Schum. (Aulacocalyx diervilleoides (K.Schum.) E.M.A.Petit)
- Cremaspora triflora (Thonn.) K.Schum.
- Polysphaeria lanceolata Hiern
- Alberta magna E. Mey
- Vangueria apiculata K.Schum. (Vangueria longicalyx Robyns)
- Vangueria cyanescens Robyns
- Vangueria dryadum S.Moore (Lagynias dryadum (S.Moore) Robyns)
- Vangueria esculenta S. Moore
- Vangueria infausta Burch. (Vangueria tomentosa Hochst.)
- Vangueria lasiantha (Sond.) Sond. (Lagynias lasiantha (Sond.) Bullock)
- Vangueria macrocalyx Sond. (Pachystigma macrocalyx (Sond.) Robyns)
- Vangueria monteiroi (Oliv.) Lantz (Ancylanthus monteiroi Oliv.)
- Vangueria parvifolia Sond. (Tapiphyllum parvifolium (Sond.) Robyns)
- Vangueria proschii Briq.
- Vangueria randii S. Moore subsp. chartacea (Robyns) Verdc.
- Vangueria soutpansbergensis N.Hahn
- Vangueria triflora (Robyns) Lantz (Pachystigma triflorum Robyns)
- Vangueria zambesiaca Lantz (Tapiphyllum velutinum Robyns)
- Vangueriopsis lanciflora (Hiern) Robyns ex Good
- Lagynias lasiantha (Sond.) Bullock
- Afrocanthium burttii (Bullock) Lantz (Canthium burttii Bullock)
- Afrocanthium gilfillanii (N.E.Br.) Lantz (Canthium gilfillanii (N.E.Br.) O.B.Mill.)
- Afrocanthium lactescens (Hiern) Lantz (Canthium lactescens Hiern)
- Afrocanthium mundianum (Cham. & Schltdl.) Lantz (Canthium mundianum Cham. & Schltdl.)
- Afrocanthium pseudoverticillatum (S.Moore) Lantz (Canthium pseudoverticillatum S.Moore)
- Afrocanthium racemulosum (S.Moore) Lantz (Canthium racemulosum S.Moore)
- Chazaliella abrupta (Hiern) E.M.A.Petit & Verdc. (Chazaliella abrupta var. abrupta)
- Bullockia setiflora (Hiern) Razafim., Lantz & B.Bremer (Canthium setiflorum Hiern)
- Canthium ciliatum (D.Dietr.) Kuntze
- Canthium glaucum Hiern
- Canthium glaucum subsp. frangula (S.Moore) Bridson (Canthium frangula S.Moore)
- Canthium inerme (L.f.) Kuntze
- Canthium kuntzeanum Bridson (Canthium pauciflorum (Klotzsch ex Eckl. & Zeyh.) Kuntze)
- Canthium oligocarpum subsp. captum (Bullock) Bridson (Canthium captum Bullock)
- Canthium spinosum (Klotzsch ex Eckl. & Zeyh.) Kuntze
- Canthium suberosum Codd
- Psydrax livida (Hiern) Bridson (Canthium huillense Hiern)
- Psydrax locuples (K. Schum.) Bridson (Canthium locuples (K.Schum.) Codd)
- Psydrax martini (Dunkley) Bridson (Canthium martini Dunkley)
- Psydrax obovata (Eckl. & Zeyh.) Bridson (Canthium obovatum Klotzsch ex Eckl. & Zeyh.)
- Psydrax obovata (Eckl. & Zeyh.) Bridson subsp. elliptica Bridson
- Psydrax parviflora (Afzel.) Bridson (Canthium vulgare (K.Schum.) Bullock)
- Keetia gueinzii (Sond.) Bridson (Canthium gueinzii Sond.)
- Keetia venosa (Oliv.) Bridson (Canthium venosum (Oliv.) Hiern)
- Pyrostria bibracteata (Baker) Cavaco
- Pyrostria hystrix (Bremek.) Bridson (Dinocanthium hystrix Bremek.)
- Plectroniella armata (K. Schum.) Robyns
- Craterispermum schweinfurthii Hiern
- Coffea eugenioides S.Moore
- Coffea racemosa Lour.
- Coffea zanguebariae Lour.
- Guettarda speciosa L.
- Pavetta andongensis Hiern
- Pavetta cataractarum S.Moore
- Pavetta edentula Sond.
- Pavetta eylesii S. Moore
- Pavetta gardeniifolia A. Rich.
- Pavetta gardeniifolia A. Rich. var. subtomentosa K. Schum.
- Pavetta gerstneri Bremek.
- Pavetta harborii S.Moore
- Pavetta inandensis Bremek.
- Pavetta johnstonii Bremek.
- Pavetta klotzschiana K.Schum.
- Pavetta kotzei Bremek.
- Pavetta lanceolata Eckl.
- Pavetta natalensis Sond.
- Pavetta pumila N.E.Br. (geoxyle)
- Pavetta revoluta Hochst.
- Pavetta schumanniana F. Hoffm. ex K. Schum.
- Pavetta umtalensis Bremek.
- Pavetta zeyheri Sond.
- Psychotria capensis (Eckl.) Vatke
- Psychotria mahonii C.H.Wright
- Psychotria zombamontana (Kuntze) Petit
- Dirichletia pubescens Klotzsch
- Rytigynia uhligii (K.Schum. & K.Krause) Verdc. (Rytigynia schumannii Robyns)
- Rytigynia umbellulata (Hiern) Robyns
- Lasianthus kilimandscharicus K.Schum.
- Mussaenda arcuata Poir.

== Cucurbitaceae ==
- Acanthosicyos horridus Welw. ex Hook.f.
- Gerrardanthus lobatus (Cogn.) C.Jeffrey

== Asteraceae ==
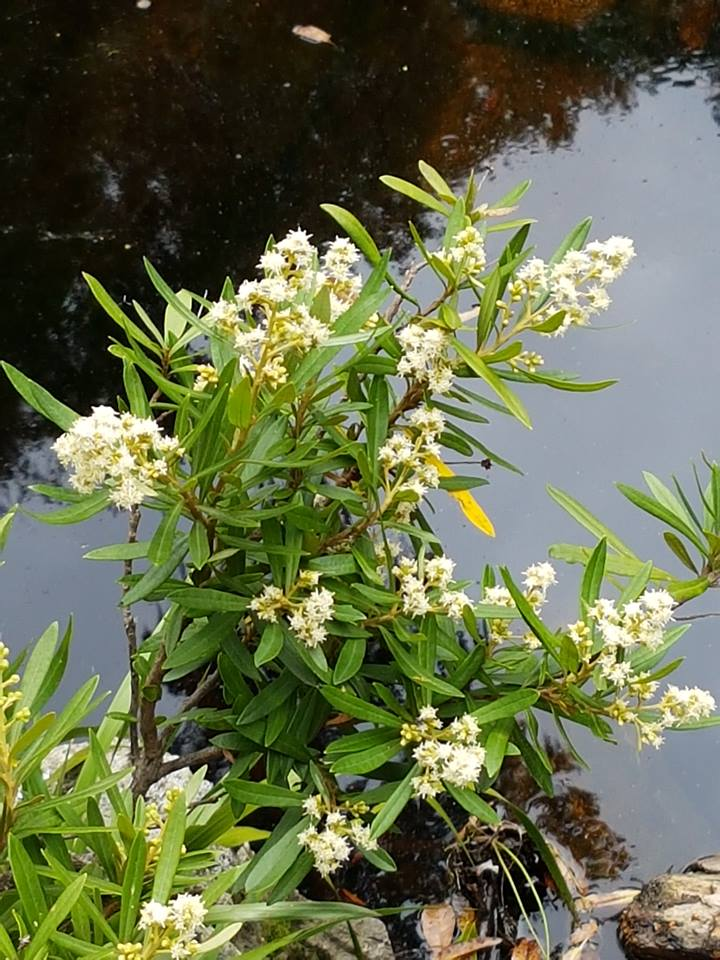
Brachylaena neriifolia

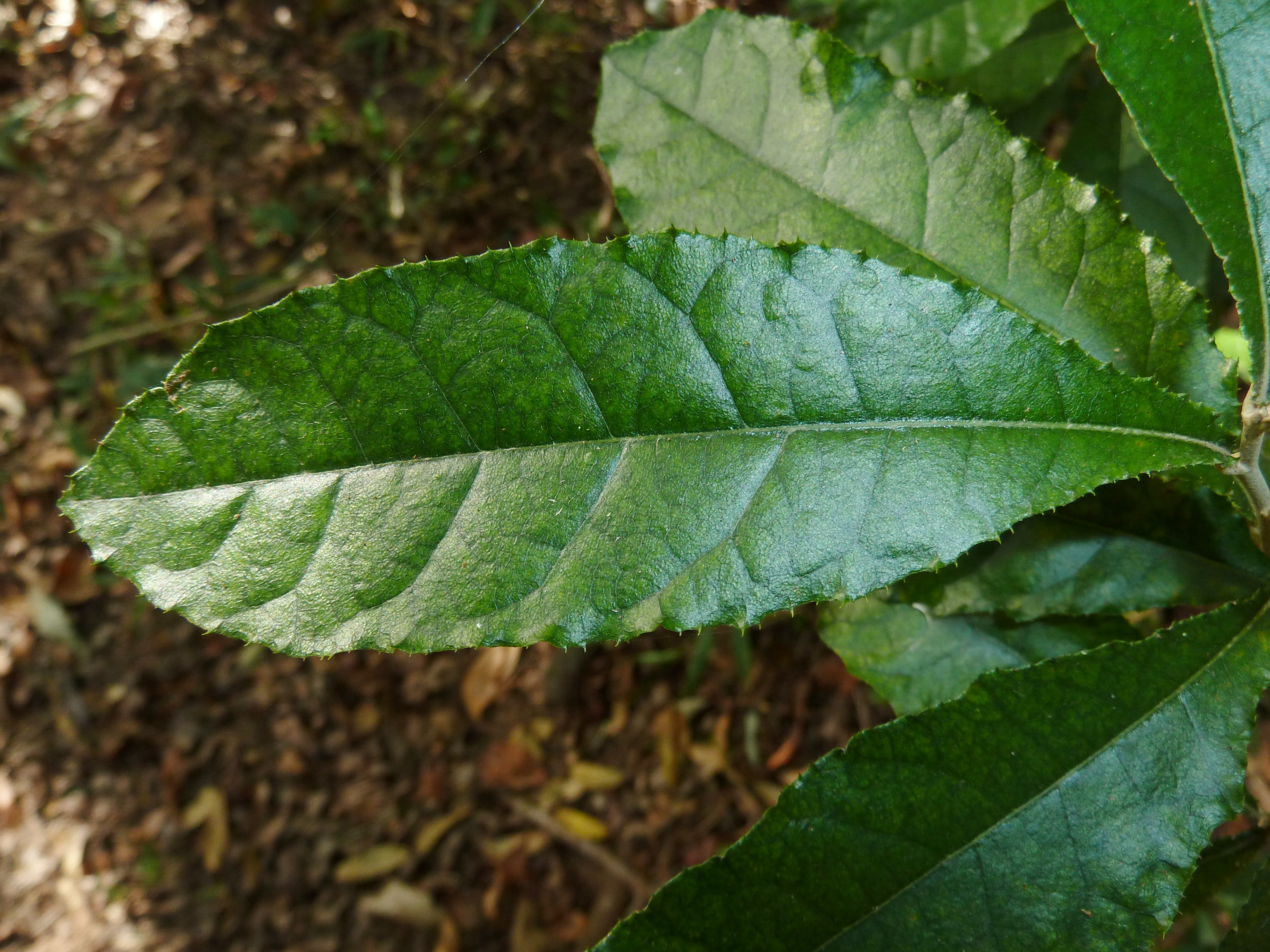
Brachylaena uniflora

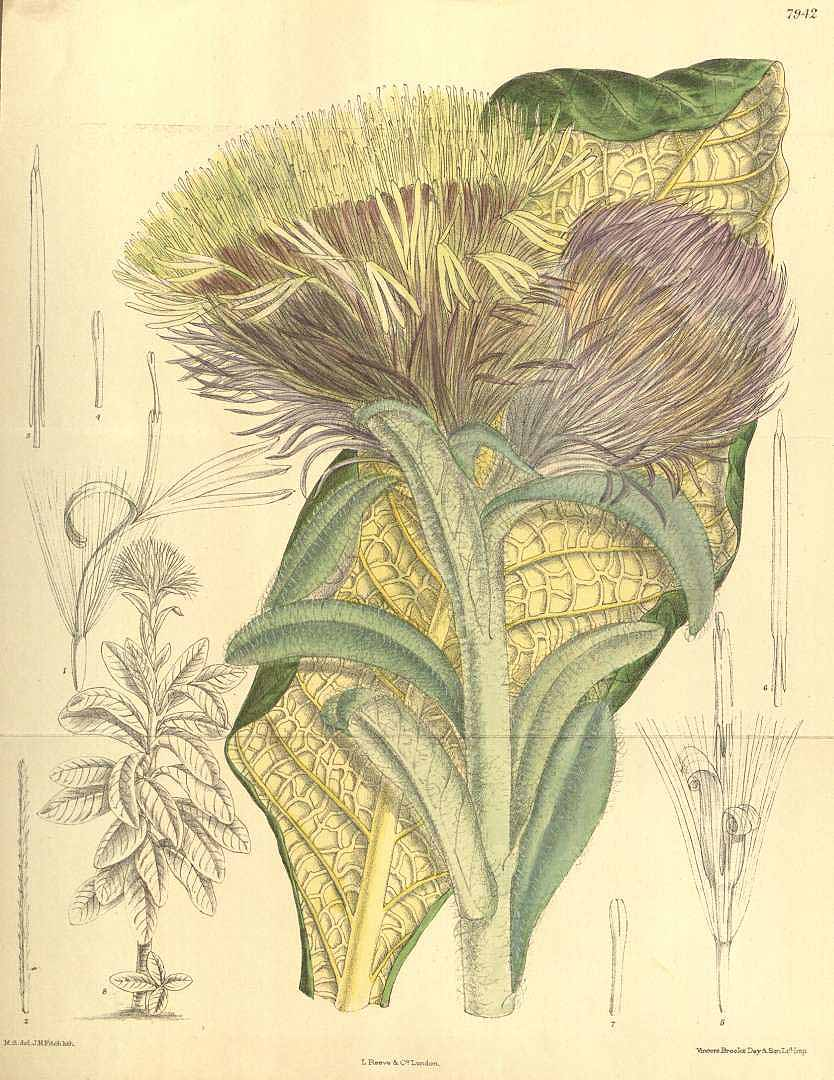
Oldenburgia grandis

- Pluchea dioscoridis (L.) DC.
- Vernonia amygdalina Del. (Vernonia randii S.Moore)
- Vernonia calvoana subsp. leucocalyx (O.Hoffm.) C.Jeffrey (Vernonia leucocalyx O.Hoffm.)
- Vernonia colorata (Willd.) Drake
- Vernonia stipulacea Klatt
- Orbivestus cinerascens (Sch.Bip.) H.Rob. (Vernonia cinerascens Sch.Bip.)
- Gymnanthemum coloratum (Willd.) H.Rob. & B.Kahn (Vernonia colorata (Willd.) Drake)
- Gymnanthemum mespilifolium (Less.) H.Rob.
- Gymnanthemum myrianthum (Hook.f.) H.Rob. (Vernonia stipulacea Klatt)
- Brachylaena discolor DC.
- Brachylaena discolor DC. subsp. transvaalensis (Phill. & Schweick.) J. Paiva
- Brachylaena elliptica (Thunb.) DC.
- Brachylaena glabra (L.f.) Druce
- Brachylaena huillensis O. Hoffm.
- Brachylaena ilicifolia (Lam.) Phill. & Schweick.
- Brachylaena neriifolia (L.) R. Br.
- Brachylaena rotundata S. Moore (Brachylaena rhodesiana S.Moore)
- Brachylaena transvaalensis Hutch. ex E.Phillips & Schweick (Brachylaena discolor subsp. transvaalensis (Hutch. ex Phillips & Schweick.) Paiva)
- Brachylaena uniflora Harv.
- Tarchonanthus camphoratus L.
- Tarchonanthus littoralis P.P.J.Herman
- Tarchonanthus obovatus DC.
- Tarchonanthus parvicapitulatus P.P.J.Herman
- Tarchonanthus trilobus DC.
- Tarchonanthus trilobus DC. var. galpinii (Hutch. & Phill.) J. Paiva
- Metalasia muricata (L.) D.Don.
- Chrysanthemoides monilifera (L.) Norl.
- Artemisia afra Jacq. ex Willd.
- Phymaspermum athanasioides (S.Moore) Källersjö (Brachymeris athanasioides (S.Moore) Hutch.)
- Lopholaena coriifolia (Sond.) Phill. & Sm.
- Lopholaena platyphylla Benth.
- Senecio barbertonicus (Klatt.) Burtt Davy
- Euryops chrysanthemoides (DC.) B.Nord.
- Euryops subcarnosus DC.
- Euryops virgineus (L.f.) DC.
- Didelta spinosa (L.f.) Ait.
- Oldenburgia grandis (Thunb.) Baill. (Oldenburgia arbuscula DC.)
- Distephanus angolensis (O.Hoffm.) H.Rob. & B.Kahn
- Distephanus divaricatus (Steetz) H.Rob. & B.Kahn
- Pechuel-loeschea leubnitziae (Kuntze) O.Hoffm.
- Psiadia punctulata (DC.) Vatke
- Solanecio mannii (Hook.f.) C.Jeffrey (Crassocephalum mannii (Hook.f.) Milne-Redh.)
