= K-Strophanthidin =

k-Strophanthidin

Names
- IUPAC name 3β,5,14-Trihydroxy-5β-card-20(22)-enolid-19-al
- Systematic IUPAC name (1R,3aS,3bR,5aS,7S,9aS,9bS,11aR)-3a,5a,7-Trihydroxy-11a-methyl-1-(5-oxo-2,5-dihydrofuran-3-yl)hexadecahydro-9aH-cyclopenta[a]phenanthrene-9a-carbaldehyde
- Other names 3β,5,14-Trihydroxy-19-oxo-5β,20(22)-cardenolide, Cymarigenen, Strophanthidin

Identifiers
CAS Number	66-28-4
3D model (JSmol)	Interactive image
ChEMBL	ChEMBL111743
ChemSpider	5950
ECHA InfoCard	100.000.569
MeSH	Strophanthidin
PubChem CID	6185
UNII	W5O632DN33
CompTox Dashboard (EPA)	DTXSID00903966
- InChI: InChI=1S/C23H32O6/c1-20-6-3-17-18(4-8-22(27)11-15(25)2-7-21(17,22)13-24)23(20,28)9-5-16(20)14-10-19(26)29-12-14/h10,13,15-18,25,27-28H,2-9,11-12H2,1H3/t15-,16+,17-,18+,20+,21-,22-,23-/m0/s1 Key: ODJLBQGVINUMMR-HZXDTFASSA-N; InChI=1/C23H32O6/c1-20-6-3-17-18(4-8-22(27)11-15(25)2-7-21(17,22)13-24)23(20,28)9-5-16(20)14-10-19(26)29-12-14/h10,13,15-18,25,27-28H,2-9,11-12H2,1H3/t15-,16+,17-,18+,20+,21-,22-,23-/m0/s1 Key: ODJLBQGVINUMMR-HZXDTFASBJ
- SMILES: C[C@]12CC[C@H]3[C@H]([C@]1(CC[C@@H]2C4=CC(=O)OC4)O)CC[C@]5([C@@]3(CC[C@@H](C5)O)C=O)O

Properties
Chemical formula	C_{23}H_{32}O_{6}
Molar mass	404.5 g/mol
Density	1.43 g/mL
Melting point	169 °C (336 °F; 442 K)
Boiling point	620.7 °C (1,149.3 °F; 893.9 K)

Hazards
- Occupational safety and health (OHS/OSH)
Main hazards	Toxic
- Except where otherwise noted, data are given for materials in their standard state (at 25 °C [77 °F], 100 kPa). verify (what is ?) Infobox references

k-Strophanthidin is a cardenolide found in species of the genus Strophanthus. It is the aglycone of k-strophanthin, an analogue of ouabain. k-strophanthin is found in the ripe seeds of Strophanthus kombé and in the lily Convallaria.

K-Strophantidin can be differentiated into:

- k-Strophanthin-α, h-Strophanthin, Cymarin, Strophanthidin-D-cymarosid (CAS: 508-77-0)
- k-Strophanthin-β, k-Strophanthin, Strophosid, Strophanthidin-glucocymarosid (CAS: 560-53-2)
- k-Strophanthin-γ,k-Strophanthosid, Strophanthidin-diglucocymarosid (CAS: 33279-57-1)
- Convallatoxin or Strophanthidin-L-rhamnosid (CAS: 508-75-8)
- Convallosid or Strophanthidin-glucorhamnosid (CAS: 13473-51-3)

Strophantidin is a cardiac glycoside which mechanism of action is similar to Digitalis, Ouabain and digitoxin. It specifically inhibits the membrane protein Na+/ K+ ATPase in muscle tissue (heart) which can lead to Ca2+ overload, diastolic dysfunction, arrhythmias and ultimately to heart failure and death. Native African tribes used Strophantidin among other toxins as arrow poison.

== History ==
=== 1505 ===
Arrow poison of the plant Acokanthera schimperi was found by the Portuguese at Melinde in East Africa. Acokanthera schimperi belonging to the family Apocynaceae is a small tree.

=== 1858 – 1863 ===
In 1858 – 1863, the Scottish missionary and explorer, Dr David Livingstone, led a River Zambesi Expedition in Central Africa. In addition to other arrow poisons, Dr Meller found among the Manganja hills a specimen of Strophanthus kombe (a climbing plant of considerable size) at the end of 1861. This plant, specimen of the seed and the extracted arrow poison were sent to Sir W. J. Hocker at Kew Gardens Herbarium in England and also to Europe. Several species of Strophanthus were also used by natives of West Africa as sources of arrow poison including S.hispidus, S. sarmentosus and S. gratus. In 1862, Dr. William Sharpey, Professor of Anatomy and Physiology at University College, London, recognized the extract as a cardiac poison.

=== 1865 – 1885 ===
In 1865, Pelikan of St. Petersburg and also British Drs. Fagge and Stevenson recognized that the action of Strophanthus was similar to that of Digitalis, a foxglove plant. Thomas R. Fraser, Professor of material medicals and therapeutics in Edinburgh also worked on frogs, birds and mammals with that "Kombe arrow poison". He found that the primary action was on the heart, but noted that voluntary muscles were gradually impaired. In 1885, Fraser had isolated a glycoside from S. kombe and called it strophanthin, a result which he presented at a meeting of the British Medical Association in Cardiff. Galenical preparations of strophanthus came to be commonly prescribed for cardiac patients. The German pharmacologist, Oswald Schmiedeberg, had determined the glucosidal nature of digitalis in 1874. Devoid of nitrogen, glycosides are ether-type compounds, derived from sugars and hydroxyl compounds. Aglycone or genin is glycoside with a non-sugar, while glucoside is a glycoside with a sugar such as glucose. The strophanthin from seeds of S. kombe came to be called strophanthin-K, that from seeds of S. hispidus strophanthin-H and that from seeds of S. gratus or wood of A. schimperi was called strophanthin-G.

=== 1900 - 1960 ===
Dr. Feilchenfeld of Berlin administered strophanthus as premedicant before anesthesia. Albert Fraenkel, pharmacologist in Heidelberg, saw strophanthus as therapeutical in cardiac failure (emergency cases initially). So strophanthin-K (Kombetin) were used oral and intravenous. In 1925, it was recognized that absorption of strophanthus from the gut was less complete than that of digitalis. As consequence, its oral use was declined, whereas IV use was increased. Between 1910 and 1935, Fraenkel reported tens of thousands IV injections of strophanthin without complications. Bruno Kisch (New York City) noted that ouabain (strophanthin-G) has a positive ionotropic activity and faster onset than digitalis. He also found out that the use of cardiac stimulant might alleviate myocardial depression in the presence of shock (first treatment on humans with shock was in 1950). Ouabain get used in anesthesia 1955 in Britain. But in 1960, sympathomimetic drugs as catecholamines were used in management of shock so that the use of strophanthin declined.

== Production K-Strophanthidin ==
Strophanthin can be isolated from Acokanthera schimperi (family of Apocynaceae), from African plant sources (arrow poisons). Strophanthin-K can be found in seeds of S. kombe. Isolation of k-strophanthin can be done using high performance liquid chromatography (HPLC) followed by detection with electrospray ionization mass-spectrometry (ESI-MS) using RP-C-18 column (1% formic acid in water/acetonitrile as mobile phase). For details see [17]. [5] [15]

== Metabolism in the human body ==
K-strophanthidin can enter the body by oral ingestion or intravenously. There is a significant difference in urinary excretion between those two possibilities. The half-life of k-strophanthidin when ingested orally is 23.3 hours whereas the half-life after intravenous injection is only 13.4 hours. After 24 hours already 80% of that compound is eliminated from the body. Most of the substance is excreted as a conjugated metabolites, only a small amount is excreted unchanged. There are three metabolic routes possible for k-strophanthidin. The first is the cleavage of the cymarose residue of cymarin (k-strophanthidin-alpha) which leads to k-strophantidin. Secondly, a reduction of C_{19} aldehyde group of cymarin or k-strophanthidin can take place. This results in the formation of cymarol and k-strophanthidol. The third important route is the conjugation of cymarin and its metabolites with glucuronate and sulfate at the sugar residue or C_{3} of the genin. This is the main route of urinary excretion. The metabolization routes do not differ considering the method of administration (orally or intravenously) so it is still unclear why the half-life differs that much.

== Medical use and effects ==
Cymarin (or k-strophanthidin) is a cardiac glycoside which works as an inhibitor of Na^{+} /K^{+}-ATPase . This inhibition has an inotropic effect on the cardiac muscles increasing their force by approximately 100%. The inhibition of that protein leads to its major effect, an increase of the [Na^{+}]_{i}. This leads to an influx of Ca^{2+} via the Na^{+} /Ca^{2+}-exchanger driven by the emerged Na^{+} gradient. That influx drives the sarcoplasmatic reticulum of the cardiac muscles to take up and release Ca^{2+}. This leads to the mentioned inotropic effect. This only occurs between a given dose between 0.1 μmol/L and 0.5 μmol/L. Beneath the minimum dose there is no significant effect. Above the maximum dose toxic effects occur such as Ca^{2+}-overload, diastolic dysfunction and arrhythmias. The toxic effect is also influenced by the mechanism of action of a protein called phospholemman which regulates the sodium pump in the heart. Depending on the efficiency of this protein toxic effects can be more severe respectively occur faster or can be lessened by it. The inotropic and toxic effect of strophanthidin is already tested in failing human myocardium where it can be used therapeutically to strengthen the failing heart if dosed correctly.

== See also ==
- Ouabain
- Digoxin
- Myocardial infarction
- Toxicity
- Detoxification
- Muscle contraction
- Cardiac glycosides
