= Spider tresses =

Spider tresses is a common name for several species of Strophanthus and may refer to:

- Strophanthus eminii
- Strophanthus gratus
- Strophanthus preussii
- Strophanthus sarmentosus
