= Strophanthus vanderijstii =

Scientific classification
- Kingdom: Plantae
- Clade: Tracheophytes
- Clade: Angiosperms
- Clade: Eudicots
- Clade: Asterids
- Order: Gentianales
- Family: Apocynaceae
- Genus: Strophanthus
- Species: S. vanderijstii

Binomial name
- Strophanthus vanderijstii Staner

Synonyms
- Strophanthus angusii F.White

Species of plant

Strophanthus vanderijstii is a plant in the family Apocynaceae.

== Description ==
Strophanthus vanderijstii is a fire-adapted shrub. It is similar to S. amboensis but has narrower leaves with less conspicuous venation, seeds with shorter beaks (2mm long or less) and shorter anthers (4.2-4.4 mm long).

== Distribution and habitat ==
Strophanthus vanderijstii is native to north-central Angola, southern Democratic Republic of the Congo, and Zambia.
