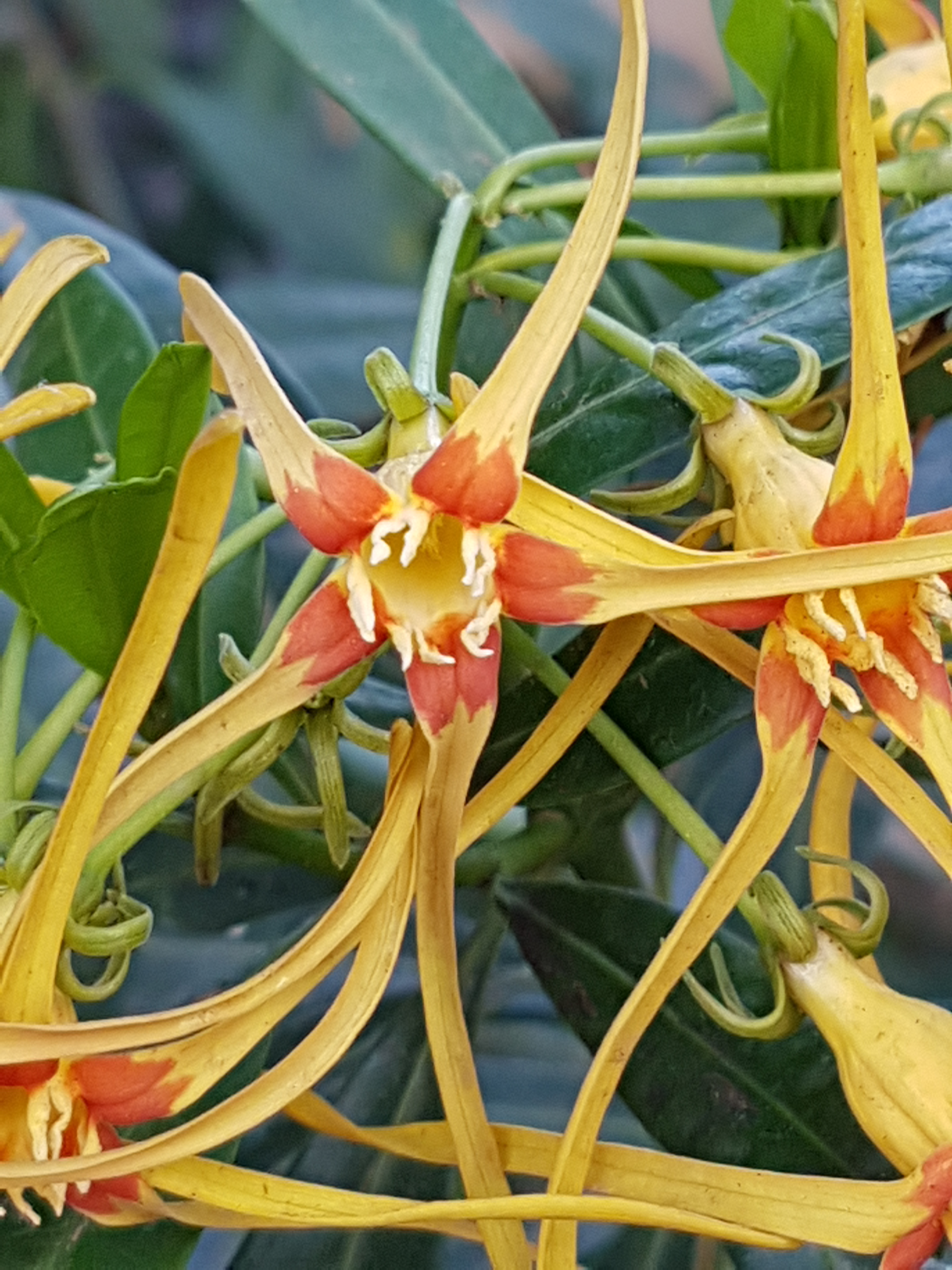

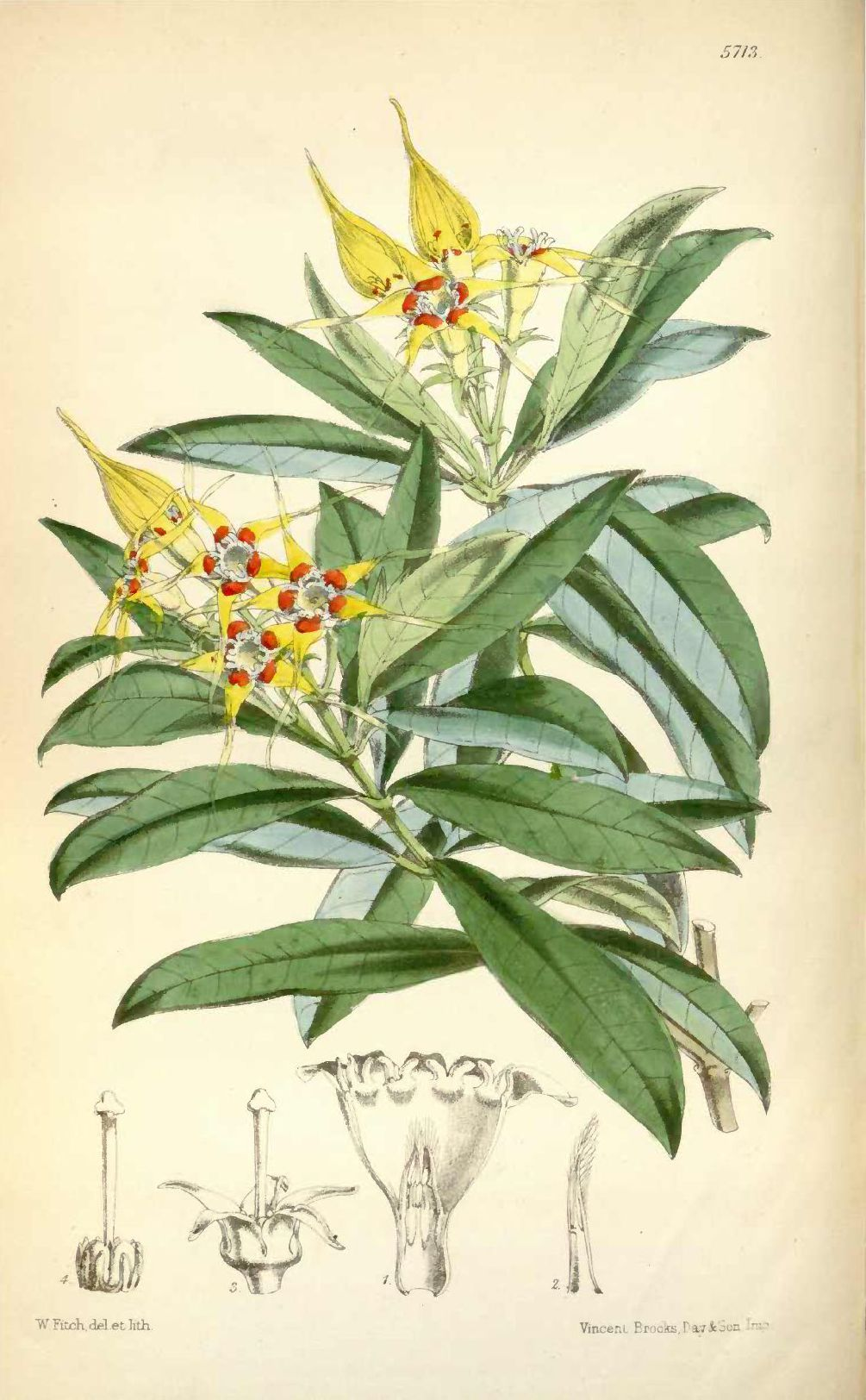
- Strophanthus speciosus

Conservation status
- Least Concern (IUCN 3.1)

Scientific classification
- Kingdom: Plantae
- Clade: Tracheophytes
- Clade: Angiosperms
- Clade: Eudicots
- Clade: Asterids
- Order: Gentianales
- Family: Apocynaceae
- Genus: Strophanthus
- Species: S. speciosus

Binomial name
- Strophanthus speciosus (Ward & Harv.) Reber

Synonyms
- Christya speciosa Ward & Harv.; Strophanthus capensis A.DC.

= Strophanthus speciosus =

Forest poison rope

Species of plant

Strophanthus speciosus, commonly known as the forest poison rope, is a tree, shrub or woody climber which is native to southern Africa.

== Description ==
Strophanthus speciosus grows as a tree or shrub up to 4 metres (13 ft) tall, and as a liana up to 16 metres (52 ft) long, with a stem diameter up to 3 centimetres (1.2 in). Its flowers feature a white turning orange corolla, red-streaked on the inside.

== Distribution and habitat ==
Strophanthus speciosus is native to Zimbabwe, South Africa and Eswatini. It occurs in forests and their margins from 300–1,400 metres (1,000–5,000 ft) altitude.

== Uses ==
Local medicinal uses of S. speciosus include snakebite treatment. The plant has also been used as arrow poison. As with other species of Strophanthus it contains the cardiac glycoside strophanthin - plants of allied genera contain similar compounds.

== Gallery ==
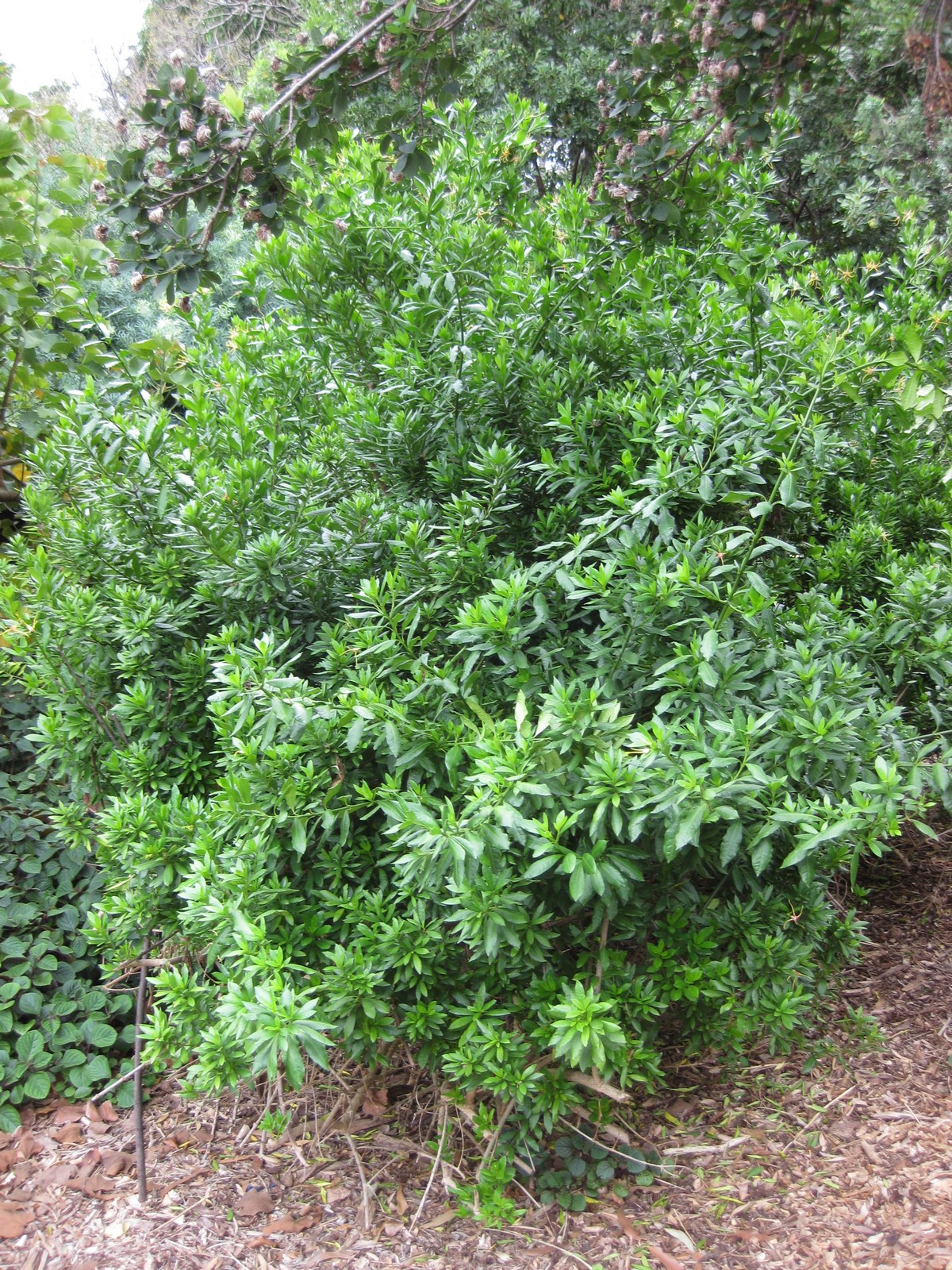
Habit

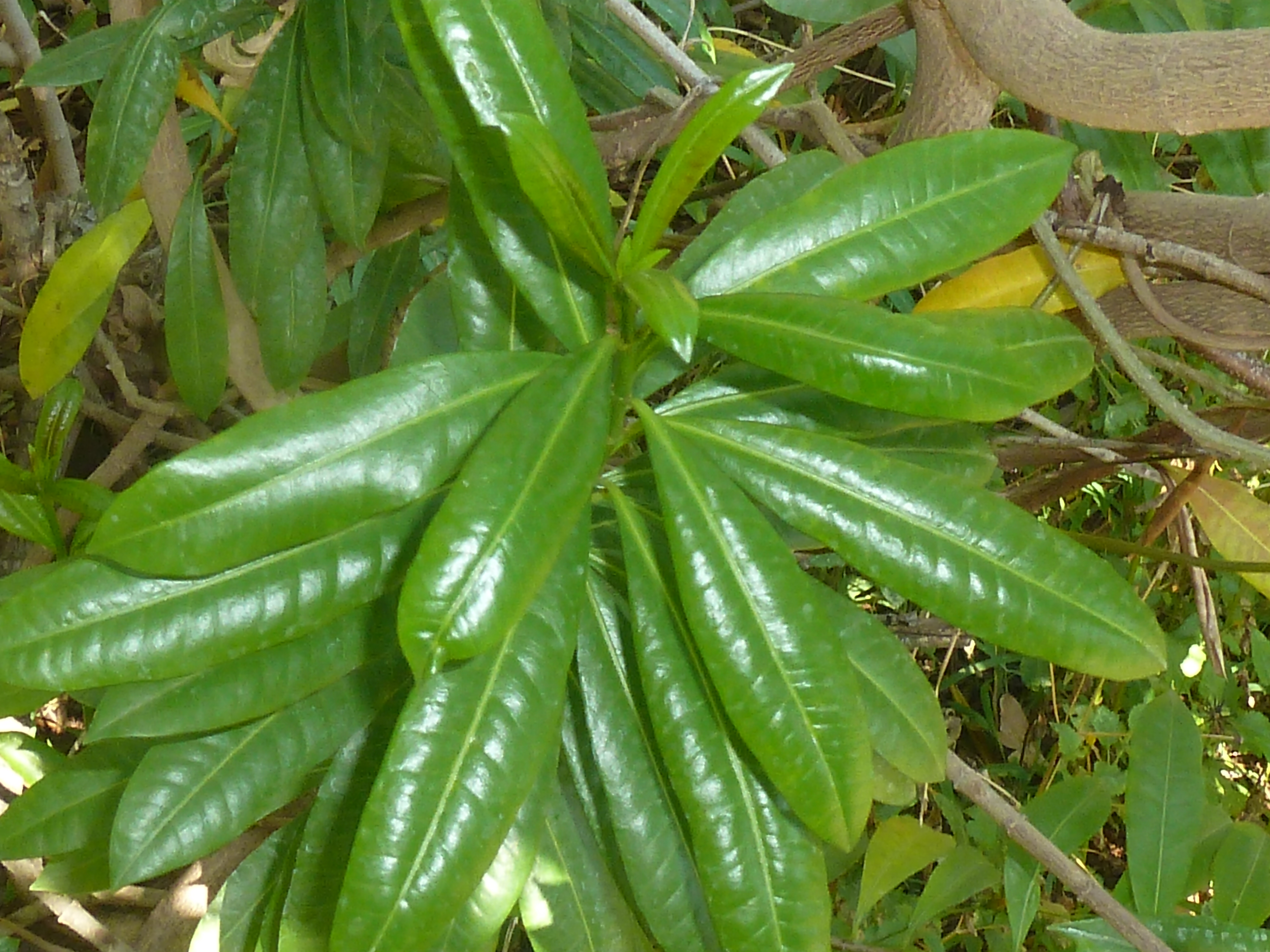
foliage

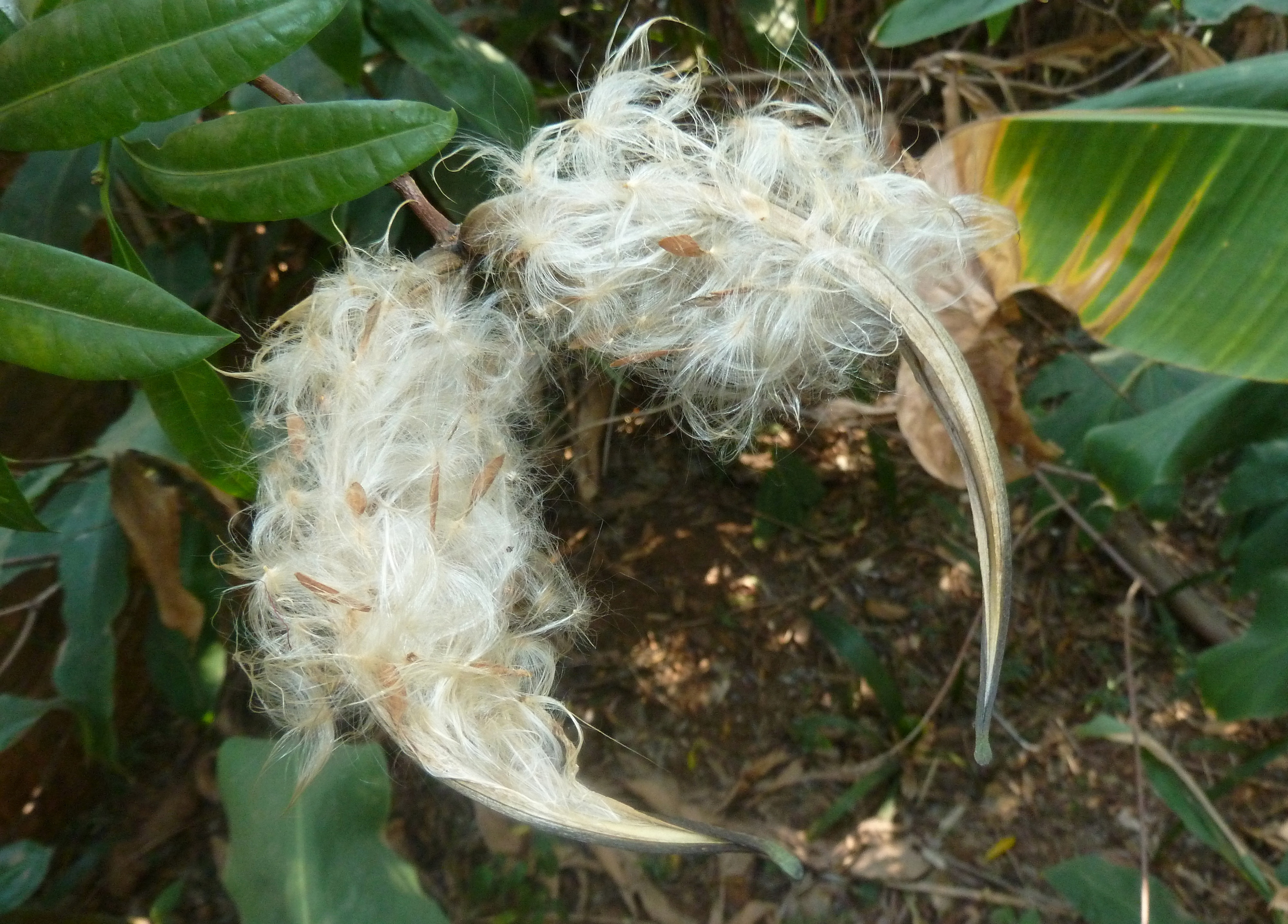
the two-horned fruit capsule, releasing seeds from both horns

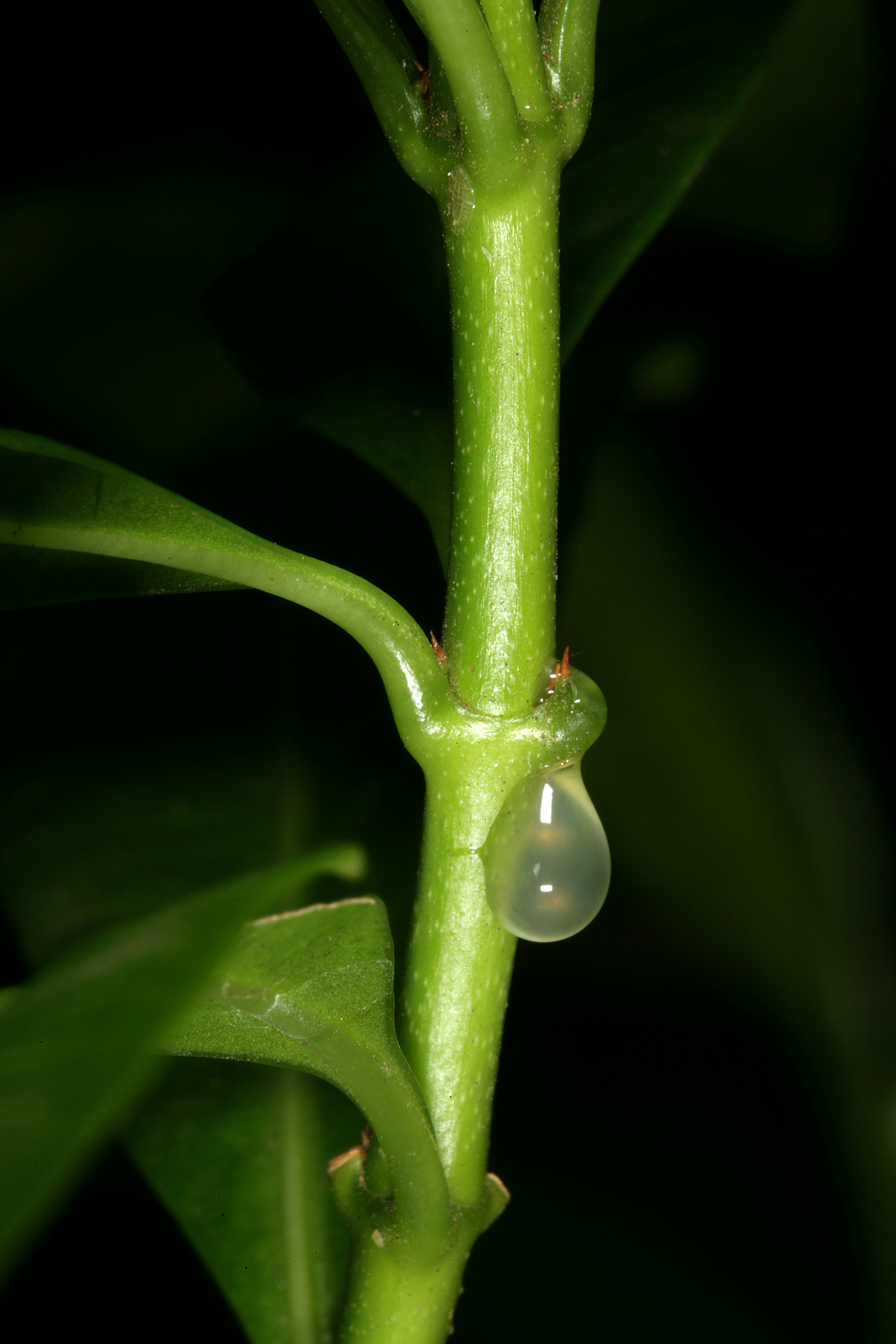
cloudy latex flowing from a scar where a leaf was broken off
