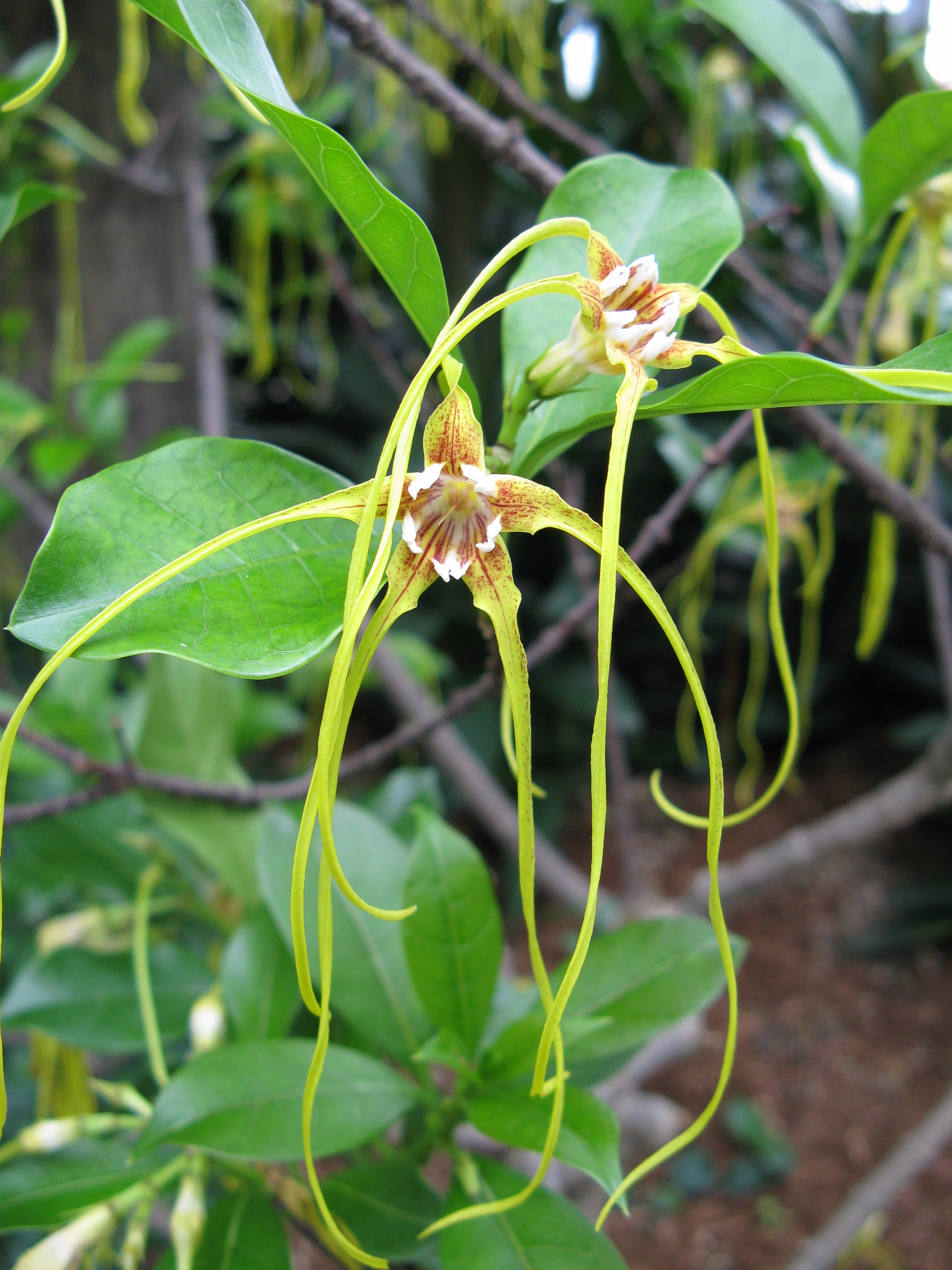

Scientific classification
- Kingdom: Plantae
- Clade: Tracheophytes
- Clade: Angiosperms
- Clade: Eudicots
- Clade: Asterids
- Order: Gentianales
- Family: Apocynaceae
- Genus: Strophanthus
- Species: S. divaricatus

Binomial name
- Strophanthus divaricatus (Lour.) Hook. & Arn.

Synonyms
- List: Emericia divaricata (Lour.) Roem. & Schult.; Faskia divaricata (Lour.) Lour. ex B.A.Gomes; Pergularia divaricata Lour.; Periploca divaricata (Lour.) Spreng.; Streptocaulon divaricatum (Lour.) G.Don; Vallaris divaricata (Lour.) G.Don; Nerium chinense W.Hunter ex Roxb.; Strophanthus chinensis G.Don; Strophanthus dichotomus var. chinensis Ker; Strophanthus divergens Graham

= Strophanthus divaricatus =

Species of plant

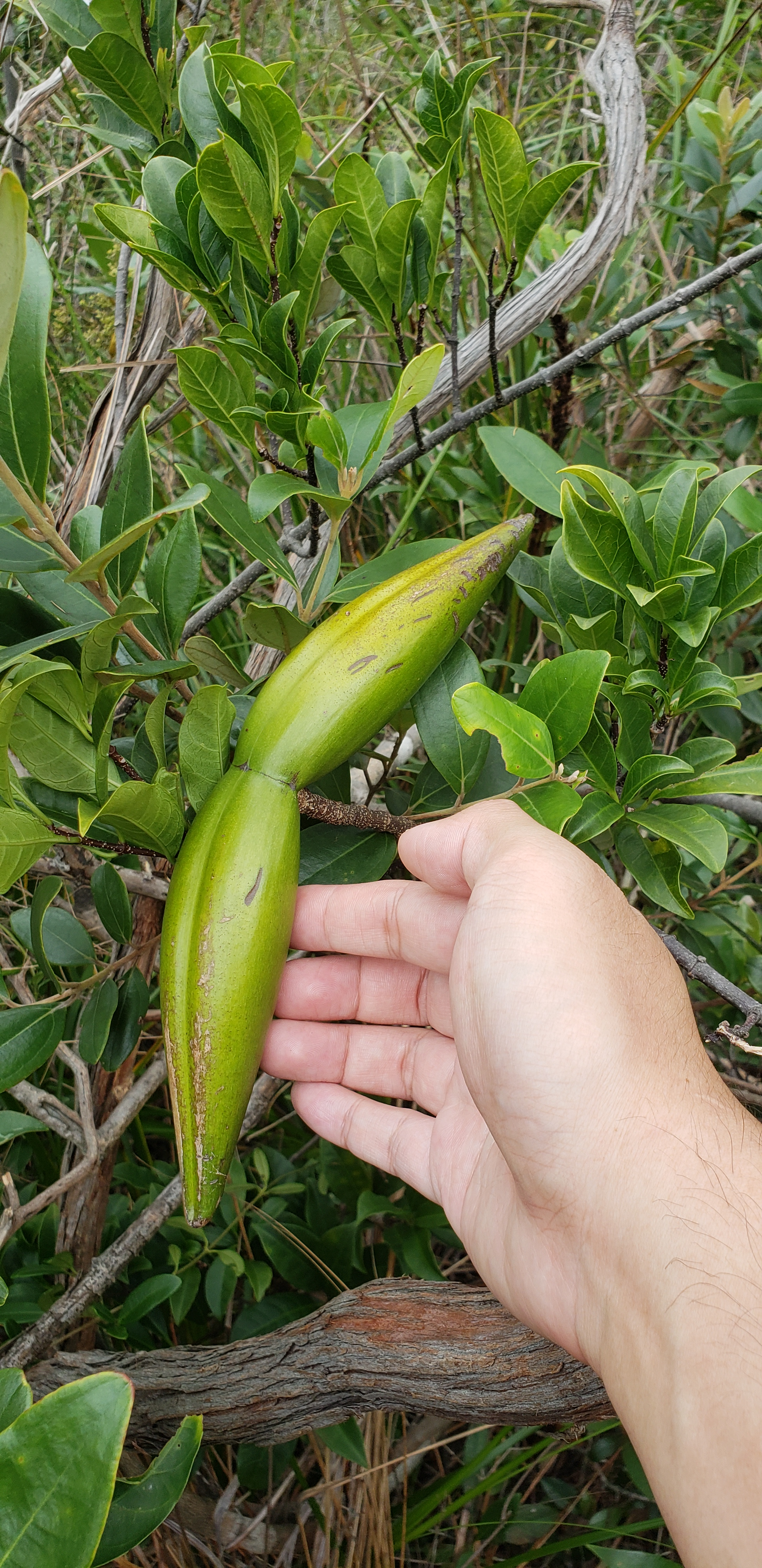
Fruit resembling goat's horns

Strophanthus divaricatus is a species of flowering plant in the family Apocynaceae. It is a liana or sarmentose shrub growing up to 4.5 m (15 ft) tall, with a trunk diameter of up to 4 cm (1.6 in). The specific epithet divaricatus means 'spreading at a wide angle'. The plant has been used medicinally: as a heart stimulant and in the treatment of snakebites. It is native to southern China and northern Vietnam.
