= Strophanthus nicholsonii =

Scientific classification
- Kingdom: Plantae
- Clade: Tracheophytes
- Clade: Angiosperms
- Clade: Eudicots
- Clade: Asterids
- Order: Gentianales
- Family: Apocynaceae
- Genus: Strophanthus
- Species: S. nicholsonii

Binomial name
- Strophanthus nicholsonii Holmes

Synonyms
- Strophanthus asper Oliv. ex L.Planch.

Species of plant

Strophanthus nicholsonii grows as a deciduous scrambling shrub. Its fragrant flowers feature corolla lobes ending in tails up to 10 centimetres (3.9 in) long. Habitats are mopane woodlands, from 400 metres (1,300 ft) to 1,100 metres (3,600 ft) altitude. The plant is native to Malawi, Mozambique, Zambia and Zimbabwe.
