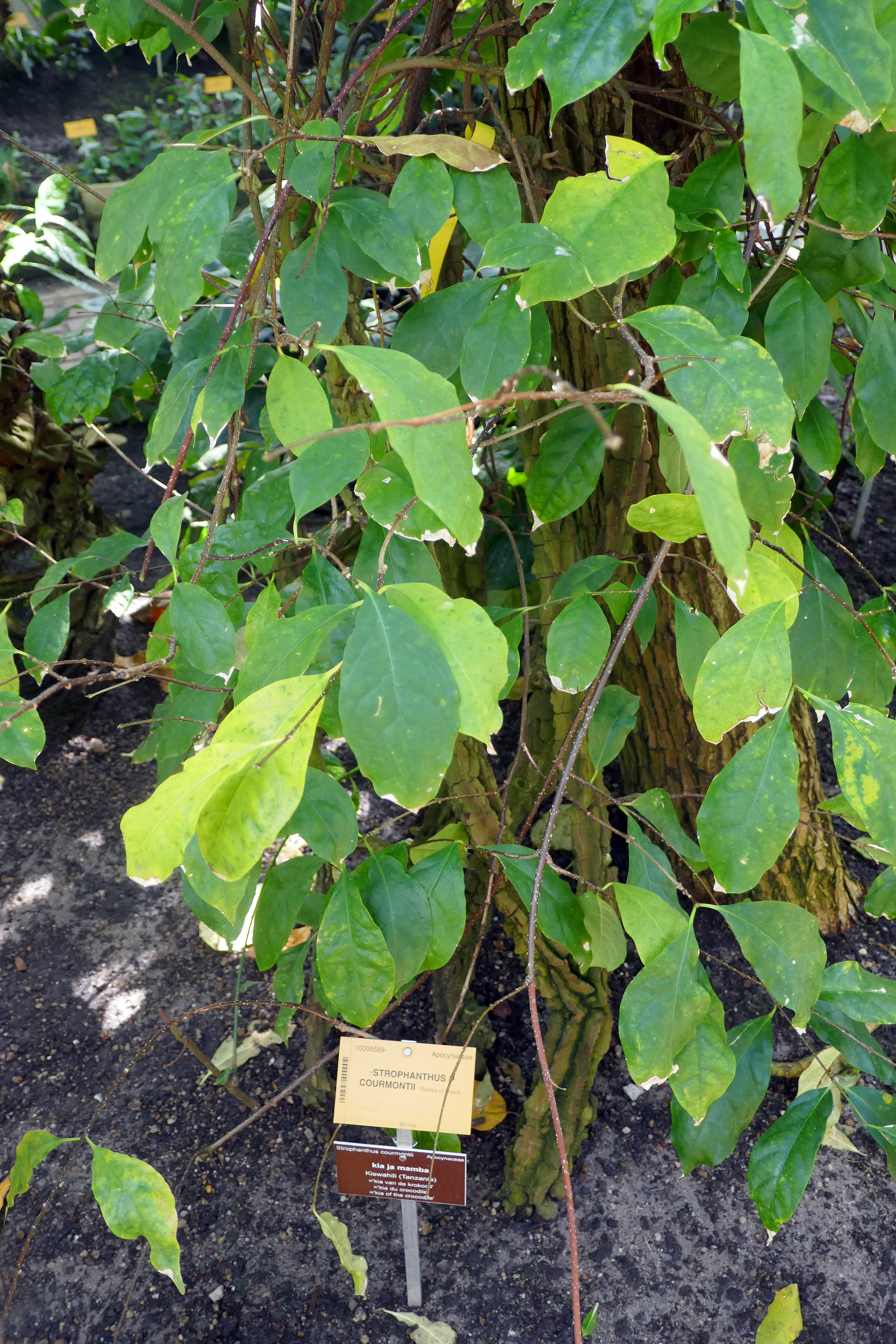

Scientific classification
- Kingdom: Plantae
- Clade: Tracheophytes
- Clade: Angiosperms
- Clade: Eudicots
- Clade: Asterids
- Order: Gentianales
- Family: Apocynaceae
- Genus: Strophanthus
- Species: S. courmontii

Binomial name
- Strophanthus courmontii Sacleux ex Franch.

= Strophanthus courmontii =

Species of plant

Strophanthus courmontii grows as a deciduous liana up to 22 metres (72 ft) long or as a shrub up to 4 metres (13 ft) tall, with a stem diameter up to 10 centimetres (3.9 in). Its fragrant flowers feature a white turning red and purple corolla tube, yellow with purple streaks inside. Habitats are forests and riverine thickets, from sea level to 1,400 metres (4,600 ft) altitude. S. courmontii is used in local medicinal treatments for rheumatism and as an aphrodisiac. The plant is native to Kenya, Tanzania, Malawi, Mozambique, Zambia and Zimbabwe.
