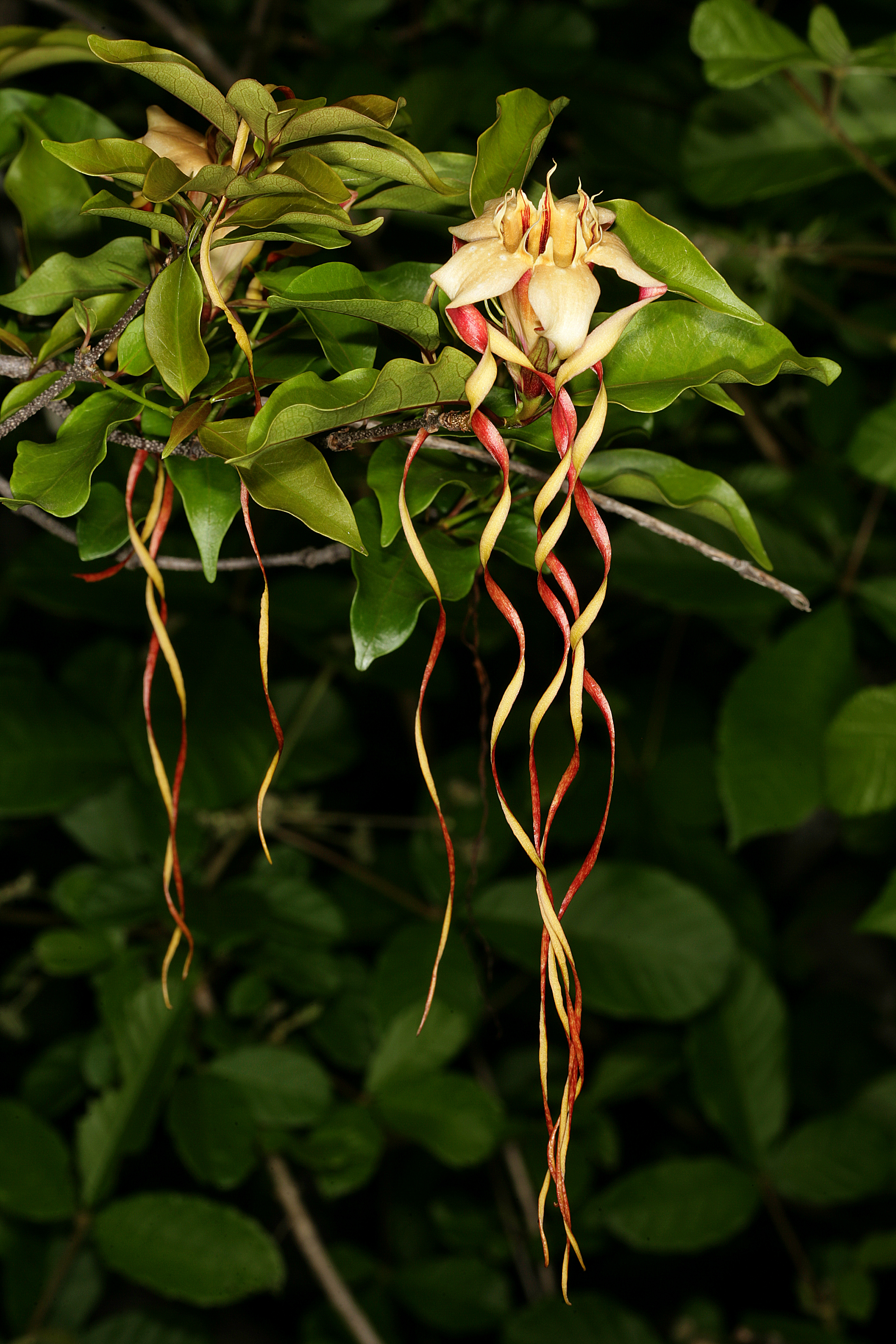
- Climber in Androstachys johnsonii thicket

Scientific classification
- Kingdom: Plantae
- Clade: Tracheophytes
- Clade: Angiosperms
- Clade: Eudicots
- Clade: Asterids
- Order: Gentianales
- Family: Apocynaceae
- Genus: Strophanthus
- Species: S. petersianus

Binomial name
- Strophanthus petersianus Klotzsch

Synonyms
- Strophanthus grandiflorus (N.E.Br.) Gilg; Strophanthus verrucosus (Pax) Stapf

= Strophanthus petersianus =

Sand forest poison rope

Species of plant

Strophanthus petersianus, commonly known as sand forest poison rope, is a liana or deciduous shrub up to 15 metres (50 ft) long, with a stem diameter up to 10 centimetres (4 in). Its fragrant flowers feature a white corolla, sometimes with reddish pink stripes on the inside. Strophanthus petersianus has been used as arrow poison and by the Zulu as a charm against evil. Its habitat is coastal forest and rocky woodland. It is native to countries from Kenya south to South Africa.
