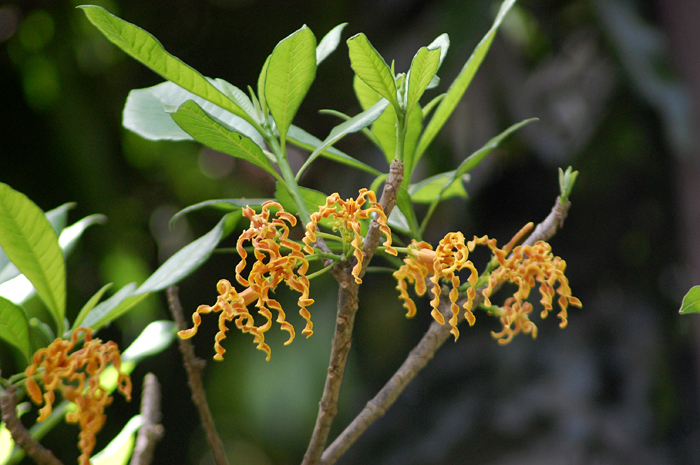

Conservation status
- Least Concern (IUCN 3.1)

Scientific classification
- Kingdom: Plantae
- Clade: Embryophytes
- Clade: Tracheophytes
- Clade: Spermatophytes
- Clade: Angiosperms
- Clade: Eudicots
- Clade: Asterids
- Order: Gentianales
- Family: Apocynaceae
- Genus: Strophanthus
- Species: S. boivinii

Binomial name
- Strophanthus boivinii Baill.

Synonyms
- Roupellina boivinii (Baill.) Pichon; Strophanthus arboreus Boivin ex Franch.; Strophanthus grevei Baill.

= Strophanthus boivinii =

Wood shaving flower

Species of plant

Strophanthus boivinii, the wood shaving flower, is a species of plant in the family Apocynaceae. It is native to Madagascar.

== Description ==
Strophanthus boivinii grows as a deciduous shrub or small tree, sometimes up to 30 m (100 ft) tall, with a bole diameter up to 40 cm (16 in). Its flowers feature a yellow-orange turning reddish-brown corolla tube.

== Taxonomy ==
Strophanthus boivinii was described by French botanist Henri Ernest Baillon in the Bulletin Mensuel de la Société Linnéenne de Paris in 1888. The specific epithet boivinii refers to French explorer and plant collector Louis Hyacinthe Boivin (1808–1852).

== Distribution and habitat ==
Strophanthus boivinii is endemic to Madagascar. Its habitat is deciduous forests and thickets, to 800 m (2,600 ft) altitude.

== Conservation ==
Strophanthus boivinii has been assessed as least concern on the IUCN Red List. Its habitat is adversely affected by agricultural practices, by harvesting for tree parts and by mining activity. However the species is present in many protected areas.

== Uses ==
Strophanthus boivinii is locally used in traditional medicinal treatments for gonorrhoea, colic, wounds and itches.
