= Strophanthus thollonii =

Scientific classification
- Kingdom: Plantae
- Clade: Tracheophytes
- Clade: Angiosperms
- Clade: Eudicots
- Clade: Asterids
- Order: Gentianales
- Family: Apocynaceae
- Genus: Strophanthus
- Species: S. thollonii

Binomial name
- Strophanthus thollonii Franch.

Synonyms
- Strophanthus pierreanus De Wild.

Species of plant

Strophanthus thollonii, or Thollon's strophanthus, is a plant in the dogbane family Apocynaceae.

== Description ==
Strophanthus thollonii grows as an evergreen liana up to 20 metres (66 ft) long, with a stem diameter up to 5 cm (2 in). Its fragrant flowers feature a white turning yellow, pink and purple corolla, white and red or purple-streaked on the inside. The plant has been used as arrow poison.

== Distribution and habitat ==
Strophanthus thollonii is native to Ivory Coast, Nigeria, Cameroon and Gabon. Its habitat is forest riverbanks from sea level to 300 m (1,000 ft) altitude.
