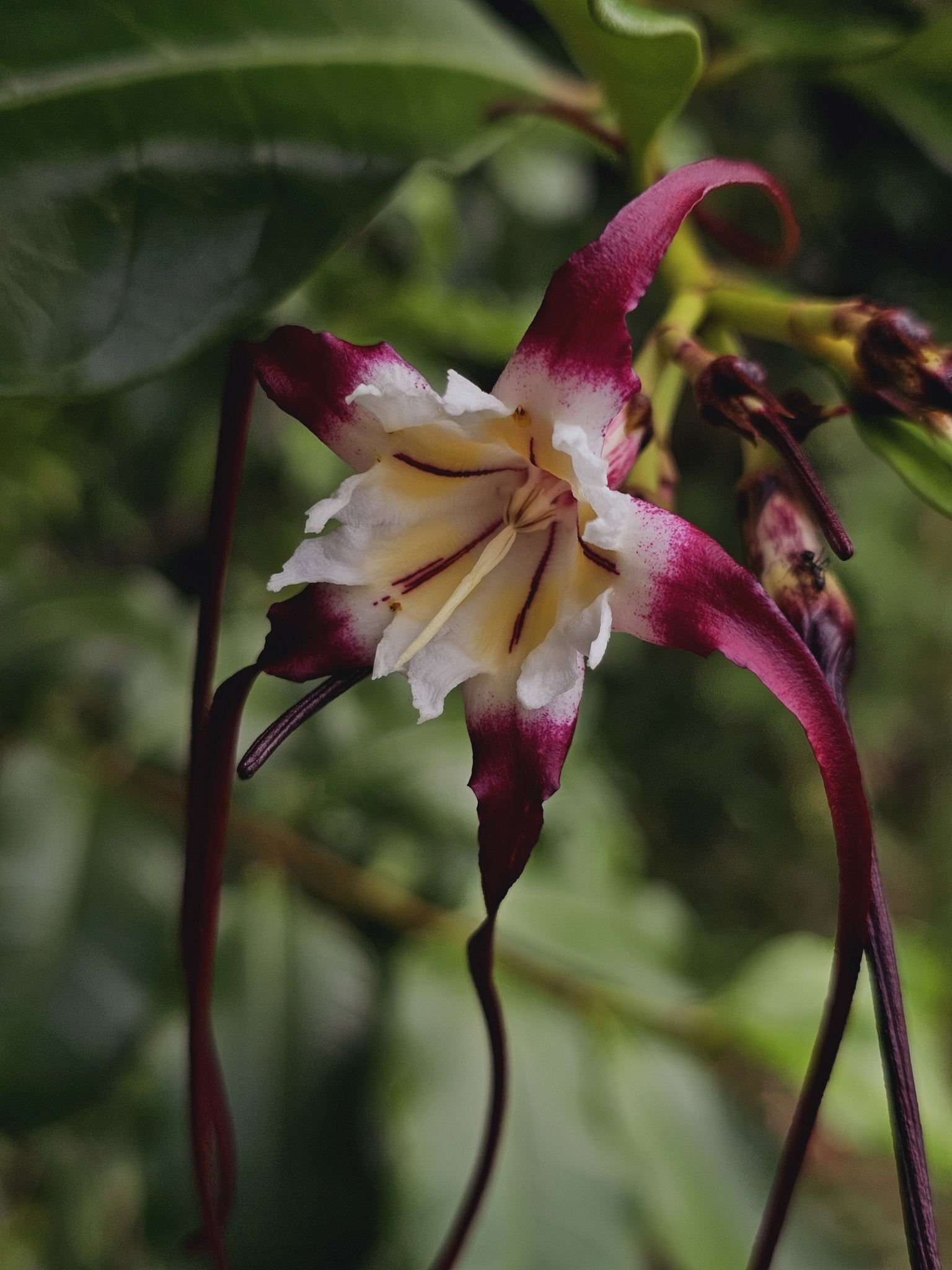
- In Singapore

Scientific classification
- Kingdom: Plantae
- Clade: Tracheophytes
- Clade: Angiosperms
- Clade: Eudicots
- Clade: Asterids
- Order: Gentianales
- Family: Apocynaceae
- Genus: Strophanthus
- Species: S. caudatus

Binomial name
- Strophanthus caudatus (L.) Kurz

Synonyms
- List: Echites caudata L.; Nerium caudatum (L.) Lam.; Nerium scandens Lour.; Strophanthus scandens Reinw. & Schult.; Strophanthus terminalis Blume; Strophanthus cumingii A.DC.; Strophanthus griffithii Wight; Strophanthus longicaudatus Wight; Strophanthus horsfieldianus Miq.; Strophanthus pierrei F.Heim; Strophanthus macrophyllus (Franch.) Pierre; Strophanthus erectus Merr.; Strophanthus letei Merr.

= Strophanthus caudatus =

Species of plant

Strophanthus caudatus is a woody liana that can grow up to 12 m (40 ft) in length, with a trunk diameter of up to 1.5 cm (0.6 in). It grows natively from Guangxi in southern China, through Indochina (including the Andaman and Nicobar Islands) to Malesia and New Guinea.
