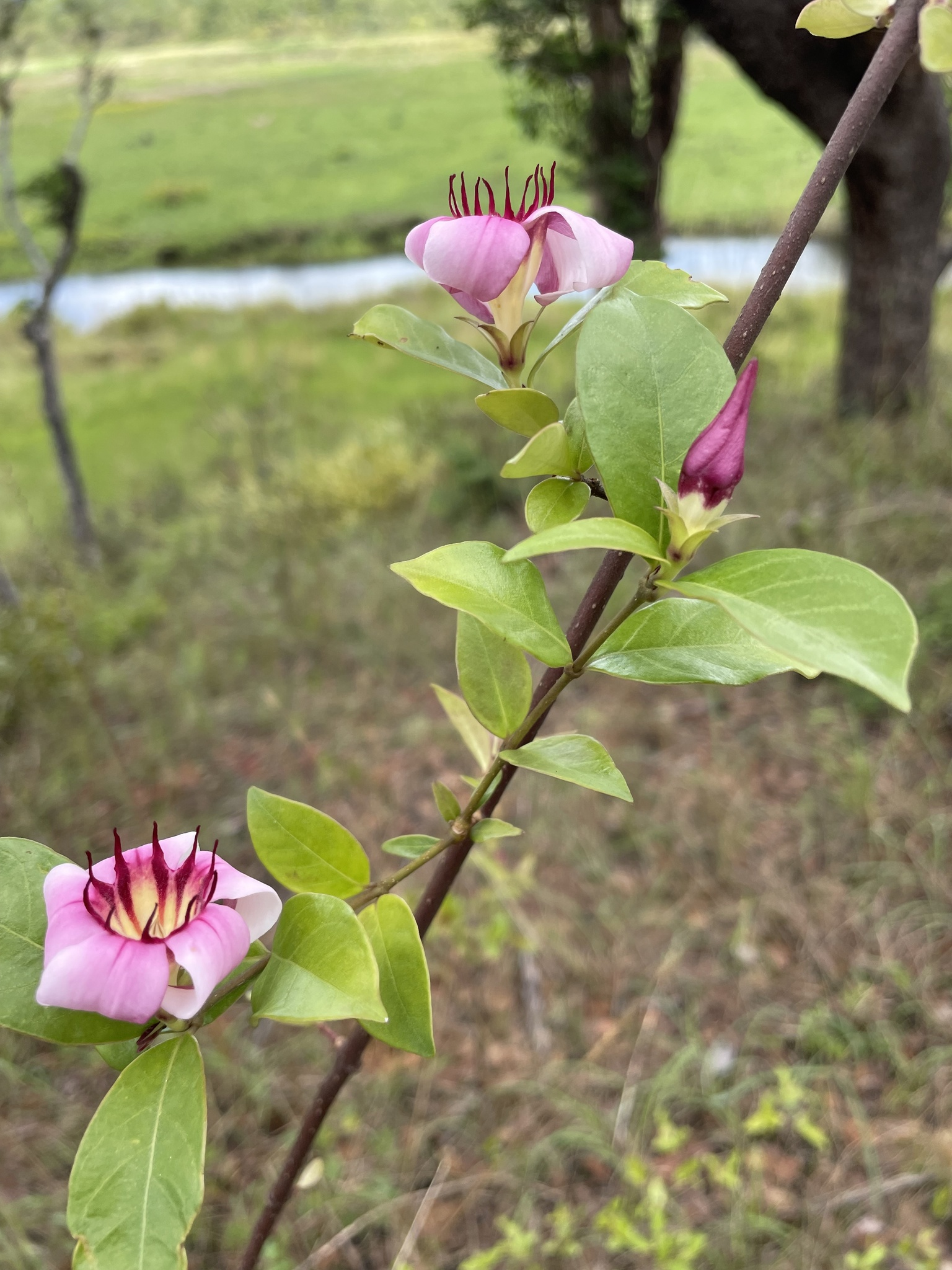
- In Angola

Scientific classification
- Kingdom: Plantae
- Clade: Tracheophytes
- Clade: Angiosperms
- Clade: Eudicots
- Clade: Asterids
- Order: Gentianales
- Family: Apocynaceae
- Genus: Strophanthus
- Species: S. welwitschii

Binomial name
- Strophanthus welwitschii (Baill.) K.Schum

Synonyms
- Strophanthus ecaudatus Rolfe; Strophanthus gilletii De Wild.; Strophanthus katangensis Staner; Strophanthus parvifolius K.Schum; Strophanthus verdickii De Wild.; Zygonerion welwitschii Baill.

= Strophanthus welwitschii =

Species of plant

Strophanthus welwitschii grows as a deciduous shrub or small tree up to 5 metres (16 ft) tall, or as a liana up to 8 metres (26 ft) long, with a stem diameter up to 10 centimetres (4 in). Its fragrant flowers feature a white turning purple corolla, creamy and red or purple-streaked on the inside. Its habitat is forests or rocky woodlands from 300 metres (1,000 ft) to 1,800 metres (6,000 ft) altitude. S. welwitschii is used in local medicinal treatments for respiratory conditions, gonorrhoea and scabies. The plant has been used as arrow poison. Strophanthus welwitschii is native to Democratic Republic of Congo, Tanzania, Angola and Zambia.
