= Strophanthin =

Strophanthins are cardiac glycosides in plants of the genus Strophanthus. The singular may refer to:

- g-Strophanthin, also known as ouabain
- k-Strophanthin

== See also ==
- Cardenolide
