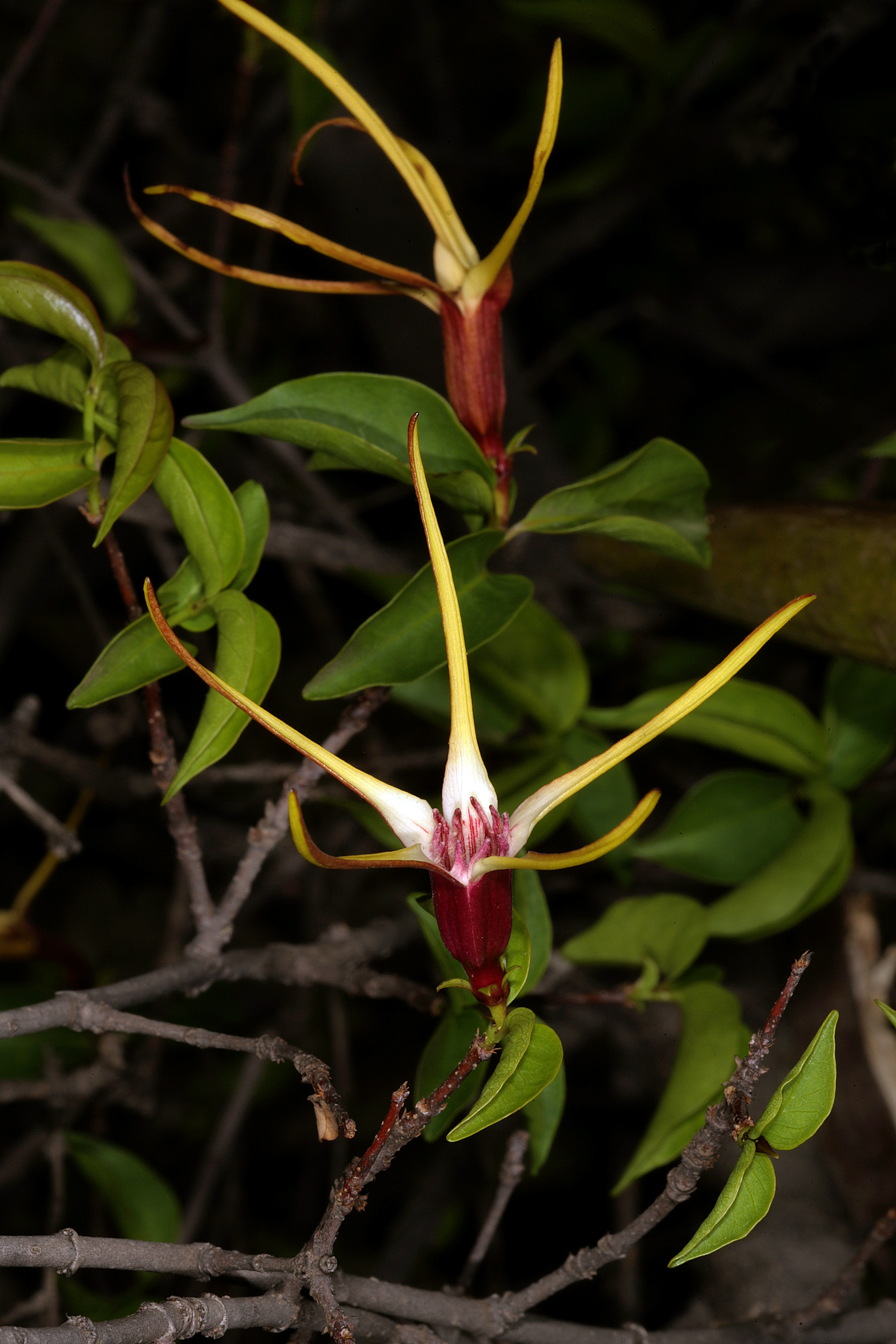

Scientific classification
- Kingdom: Plantae
- Clade: Tracheophytes
- Clade: Angiosperms
- Clade: Eudicots
- Clade: Asterids
- Order: Gentianales
- Family: Apocynaceae
- Genus: Strophanthus
- Species: S. amboensis

Binomial name
- Strophanthus amboensis (Schinz) Engl. & Pax

Synonyms
- Strophanthus gossweileri H.Hess; Strophanthus hirsutus H.Hess; Strophanthus intermedius Pax; Strophanthus longicalyx H.Hess; Strophanthus paxii H.Hess; Strophanthus petersianus var. amboensis Schinz; Strophanthus schuchardtii Pax

= Strophanthus amboensis =

Species of plant

Strophanthus amboensis is a plant in the dogbane family Apocynaceae.

== Description ==
Strophanthus amboensis grows as a deciduous shrub up to 4 metres (13 ft) tall, or as a liana up to 20 m (66 ft) long, with a stem diameter up to 20 cm (8 in). Its flowers feature an orange-yellow turning purple corolla tube, white-streaked on the inside.

== Distribution and habitat ==
Strophanthus amboensis is native to the Democratic Republic of the Congo, Angola and Namibia. Its habitats are forest margins, scrubland or rock fissures, from 450–2,000 m (1,480–6,560 ft) altitude.

== Uses ==
Strophanthus amboensis is used in local traditional medicine treatments for rheumatism, venereal diseases and scabies. The plant has been used as arrow poison.
