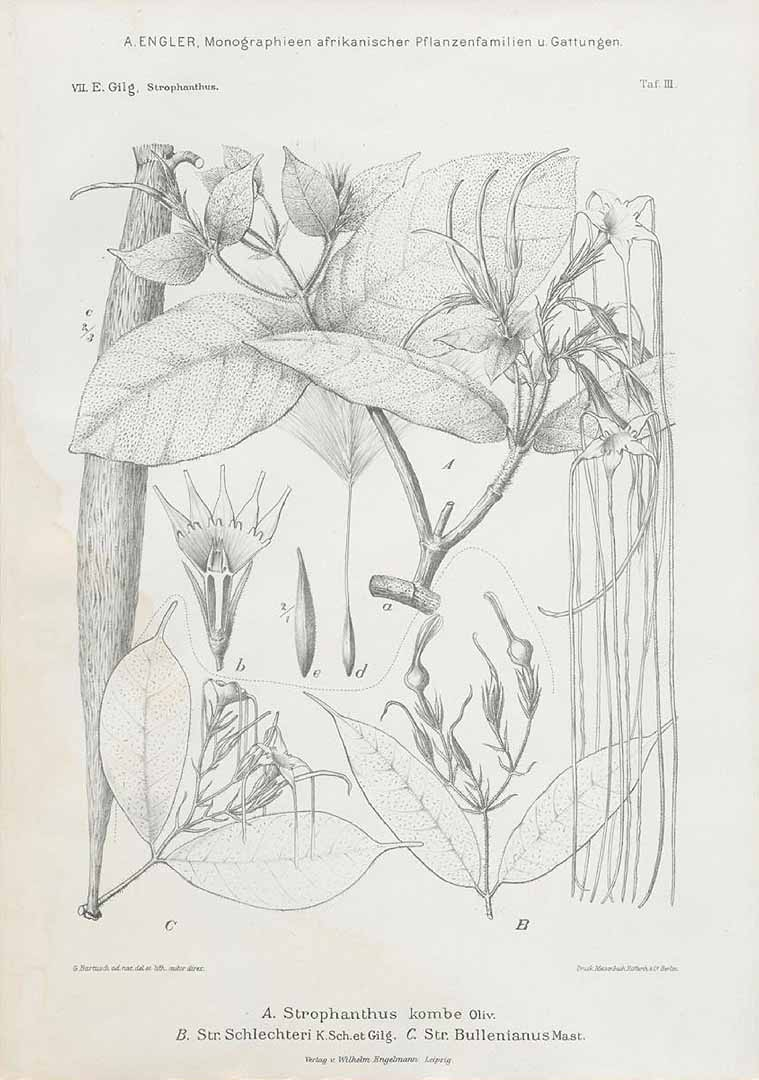

Scientific classification
- Kingdom: Plantae
- Clade: Tracheophytes
- Clade: Angiosperms
- Clade: Eudicots
- Clade: Asterids
- Order: Gentianales
- Family: Apocynaceae
- Genus: Strophanthus
- Species: S. kombe

Binomial name
- Strophanthus kombe Oliv.

= Strophanthus kombe =

Species of plant

Strophanthus kombe, the kombe arrow poison, is a vine that grows in the tropical regions of Eastern Africa, and is part of the genus Strophanthus, which contains approximately 38 species. S. kombe contains a cardiac glycoside which directly affects the heart. Historically, both the seeds and roots of the plant were used in the preparation of poison arrowheads used for hunting. Today, the seeds are used pharmaceutically for patients with certain heart conditions that affect blood circulation. The seeds are traded primarily with Europe, but have also been exported to the United States and Japan.

== Distribution ==
Strophanthus kombe is found growing naturally in the tropical regions of southeast Africa. As it is not a commercially cultivated species, it principally occurs as wild plant. It is not typically seen growing outside of its native region, although specimens are sometimes collected from the wild to be grown in foreign botanical gardens.

== Habitat and ecology ==
Strophanthus kombe is usually found on an isolated hill known as a monadnock near water sources such as coastal forests, gallery forests, riparian thickets and woodlands. It is typically found at altitudes ranging from sea level to 1100m. It is usually found growing as vines in the forests between the coast and center of Africa.

== Morphology ==
Strophanthus kombe is a deciduous vine, that under solitary conditions can be found as a shrub. Most frequently, it occurs as a climbing vine that grows to the highest points on tall trees. It is seen curling on the ground and draping from tree to tree. It can grow up to 3.5 meters, with a stem that grows up to 10 cm in diameter. The bark is a reddish brown, with dark brown, grey or black lenticels. The roots are thick and fleshy. The papery leaves are simple, and found in opposite arrangement. The young leaves are exceptionally hairy on both sides, but as they age, the top of the leaves become smooth. One to twelve cream colored flowers can be found on the peduncle. They are narrowly ovate or linear and slightly unequal. The dichasial cyme inflorescence is on the terminal end of the plant.

== Flowers and fruits ==
The flower of Strophanthus kombe is an inflorescent, bisexual, fragrant flower. It is cream colored, yellow at the base with red spots and streaks inside. There is a thick layer of hair on the outside towards the top, while the inside of the flower has very few hairs. The stamen of the flower is found near the base of the corolla tube. The pistil contains a style a few millimeters in length, with a ring-like head surrounding a minuscule stigma. The fruit of the flower contains two follicles that narrow towards the apex and end in a knob of various sizes. It has two thick and hard-walled compartments containing many spindle shaped seeds.

== Medicinal ==
Strophanthus kombe is known for its historical use as a source of arrow poison. Today it is used medicinally to treat heart failure. The plant has been used for two extremes, ending a life and saving a life, so proper dosage is crucial when using this plant medicinally. Cardiac glycosides extracted from the seeds reduce the heart rate but increase the force and efficiency of the contractions. Some glycosides can also be found in the roots and flowers. A mixture of glycosides known as strophanthin-k is found in the seeds. The purified compound is a white crystalline powder that is water-soluble and liable to hydrolysis under warm acidic conditions.

Precursors for a semi-synthetic compound known as acetylstrophanthidin are found within the seeds of Strophanthus kombe. When used clinically, this compound provides a rapid onset of vascular stimulant action.

== Trivia ==
This plant was inadvertently used as a medical experiment by Sir John Kirk, a nineteenth-century plant explorer who brought back specimens of Strophanthus kombe for the Royal Botanic Garden at Kew, United Kingdom. Some of the plant's juice accidentally found its way onto his toothbrush. After brushing his teeth, he reported a quick drop in heart rate.
