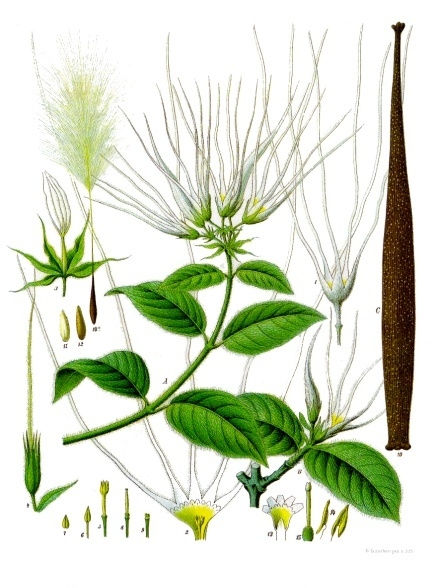
- Strophanthus hispidus

Conservation status
- Least Concern (IUCN 3.1)

Scientific classification
- Kingdom: Plantae
- Clade: Tracheophytes
- Clade: Angiosperms
- Clade: Eudicots
- Clade: Asterids
- Order: Gentianales
- Family: Apocynaceae
- Genus: Strophanthus
- Species: S. hispidus

Binomial name
- Strophanthus hispidus DC.

Synonyms
- Strophanthus hirtus Poir.; Strophanthus bariba Boye & Bereni; Strophanthus tchabe Boye & Bereni; Strophanthus thierryanus K.Schum. & Gilg

= Strophanthus hispidus =

Species of plant

Strophanthus hispidus, the hispid strophanthus, (family: Apocynaceae) is a liana or shrub that can grow up to 5 metres (16 ft) tall. Its flowers feature a yellow corolla and yellow corona lobes spotted with red, purple or brown. The seeds, like those of several other Strophanthus species, contain potent cardiac glycosides (notably strophanthin) absorbable through wounds - hence its use in African arrow poisons and later in modern medicine as a digitalis-like heart stimulant. Strophanthus hispidus is native from west tropical Africa east to Tanzania and south to Angola. It is naturalized in China.

== History of discovery ==
The plant was observed for the first time in Senegambia by a certain monsieur Houdelot, then in Sierra Leone between 1771 and 1775 by Henry Smeathman, likewise in Nigeria (in use among the Nupe) by William Balfour Baikie, in Gabon by Marie-Théophile Griffon du Bellay and in West Tropical Africa by Gustav Mann.
