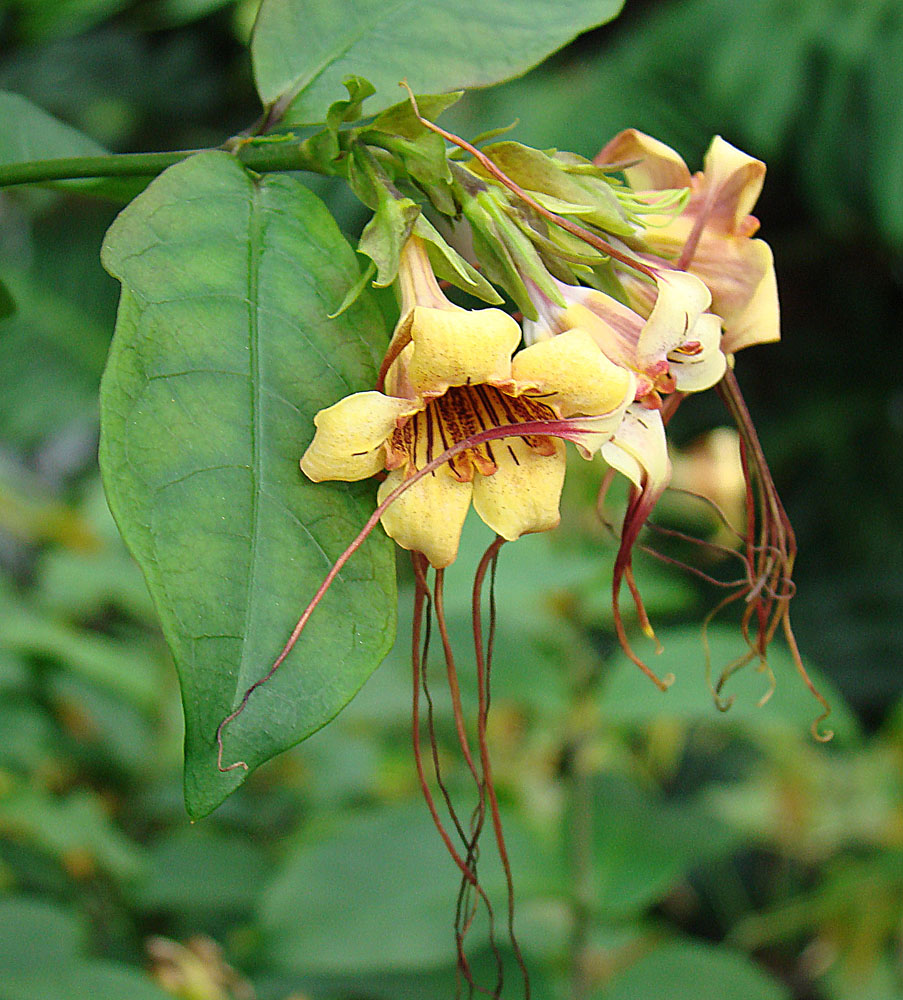

Conservation status
- Least Concern (IUCN 3.1)

Scientific classification
- Kingdom: Plantae
- Clade: Embryophytes
- Clade: Tracheophytes
- Clade: Spermatophytes
- Clade: Angiosperms
- Clade: Eudicots
- Clade: Asterids
- Order: Gentianales
- Family: Apocynaceae
- Genus: Strophanthus
- Species: S. preussii

Binomial name
- Strophanthus preussii Engl. & Pax

Synonyms
- Strophanthus bracteatus Franch.

= Strophanthus preussii =

Species of plant

Strophanthus preussii, the Preuss' strophanthus, is a plant in the dogbane family Apocynaceae.

== Description ==
Strophanthus preussii grows as an evergreen liana up to 12 m (40 ft) long or a shrub up to 5 m (16 ft) tall, with a stem diameter up to 2.5 cm (1 in). Its fragrant flowers feature a white to orange corolla, red-striped or spotted on the inside. The corollas have very long tails up to 30 cm (12 in) long. Other vernacular names for the plant include "spider tresses" and "poison arrow vine".

== Distribution and habitat ==
Strophanthus preussii is native to a wide area of tropical Africa, from Guinea in the west, east to Tanzania and south to Angola. Its habitat is forested areas from sea level to 1,400 m (4,600 ft) altitude.

== Conservation ==
Strophanthus preussii has been assessed as least concern on the IUCN Red List. The species is broadly distributed and is not currently facing any major threats.

== Uses ==
Traditional medicinal uses of Strophanthus preussii include treatment of gonorrhoea and healing of sores. The plant has also been used as arrow poison.

== Gallery ==
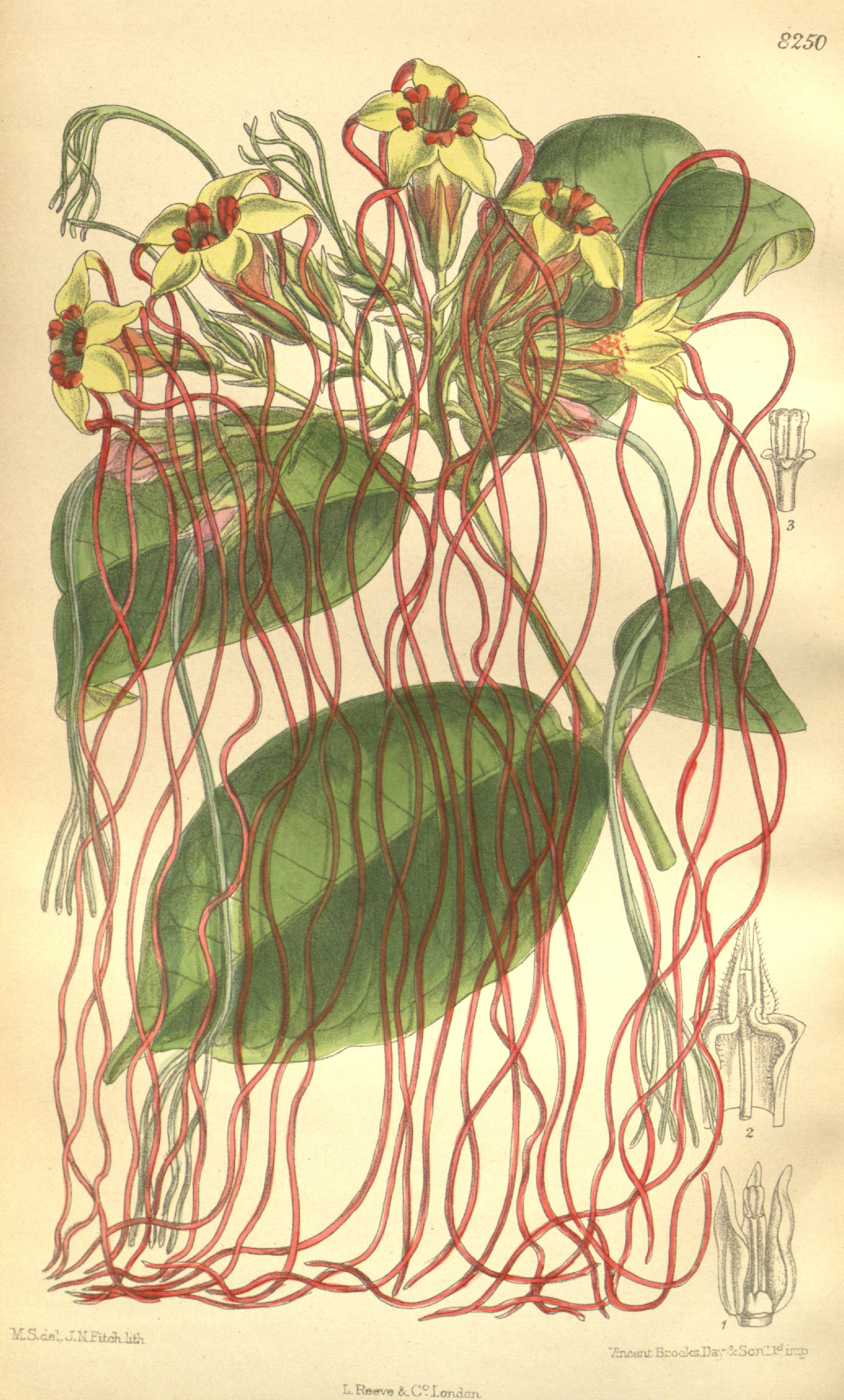
Coloured plate from Curtis's Botanical Magazine 1909

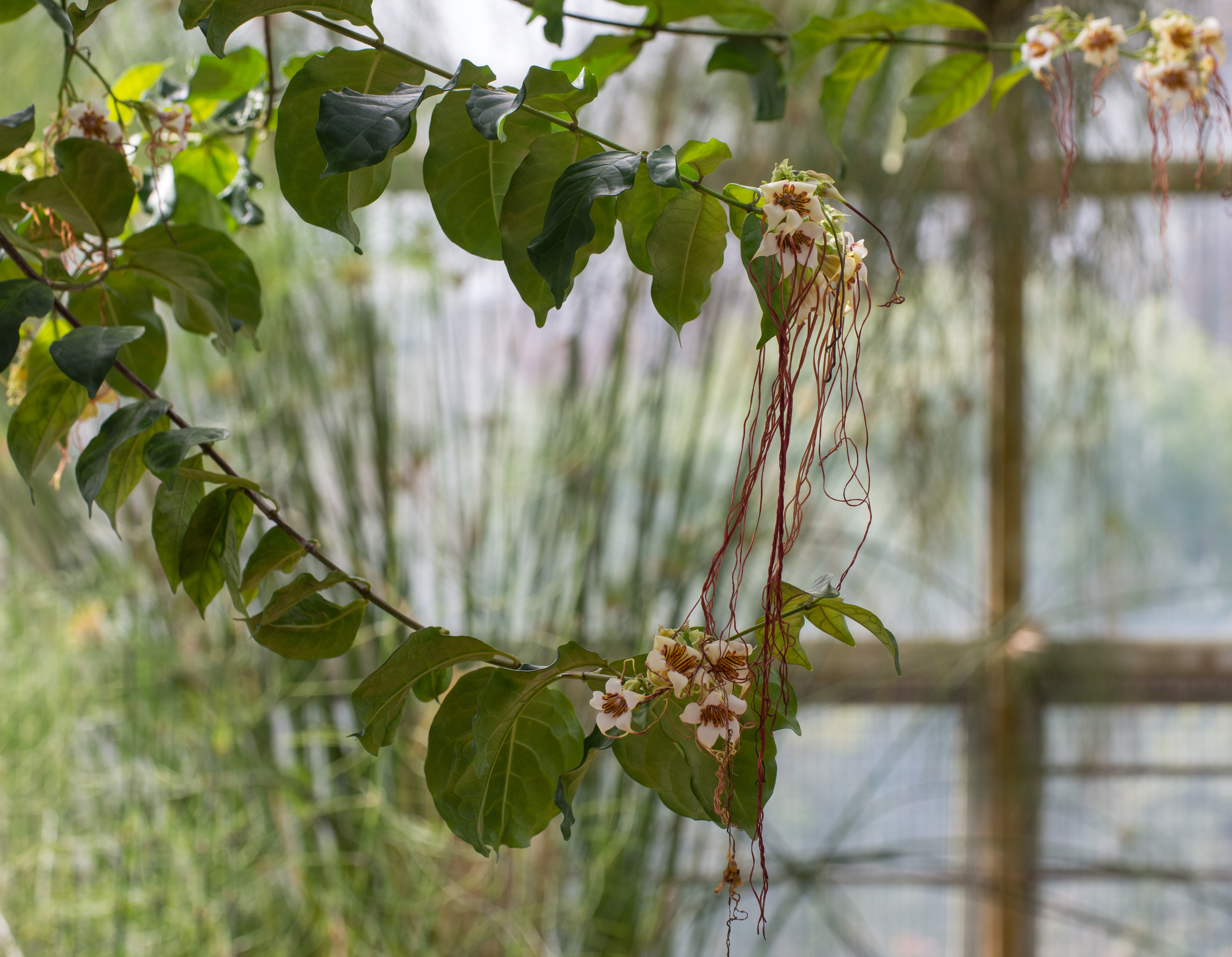

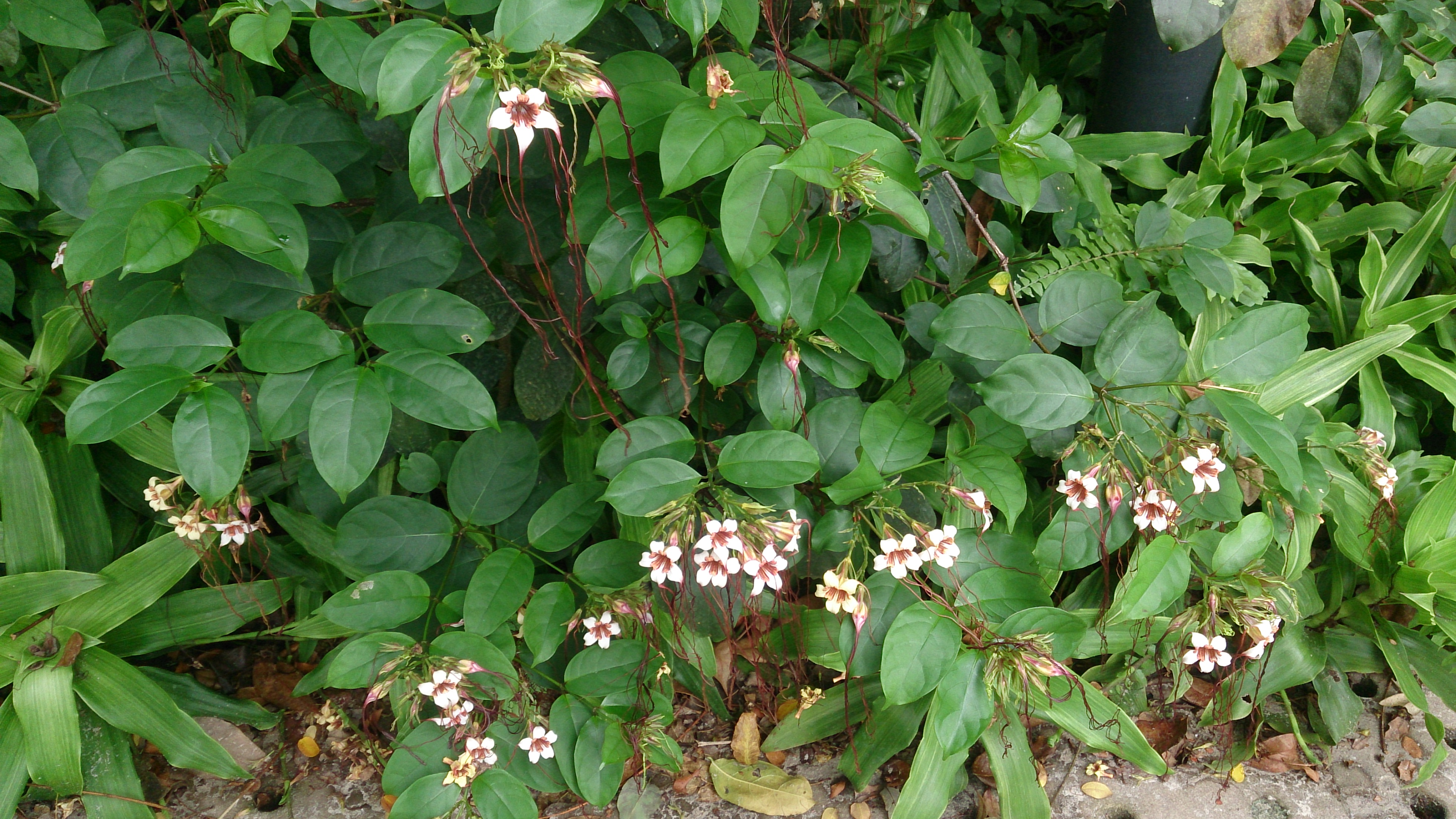

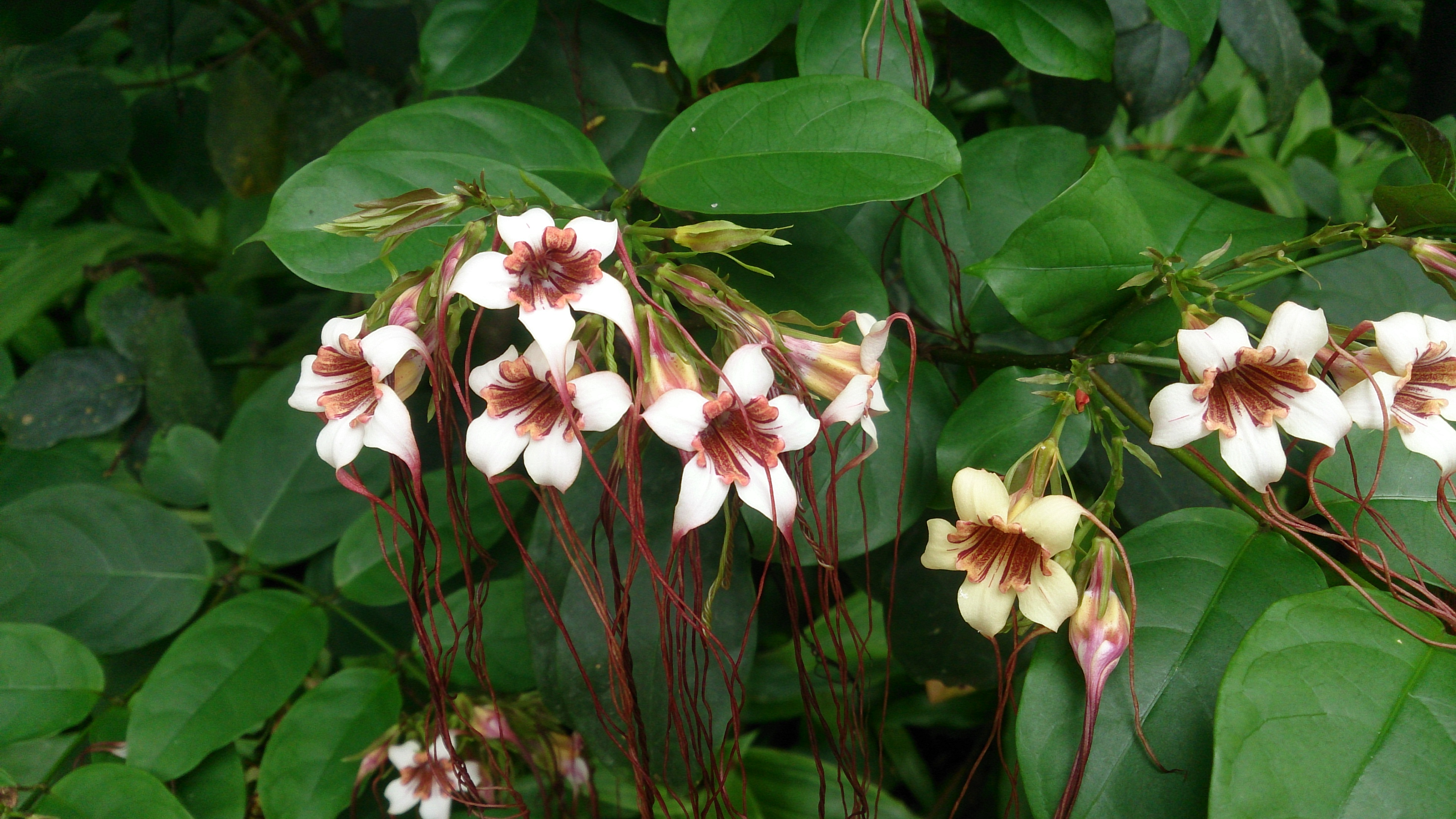

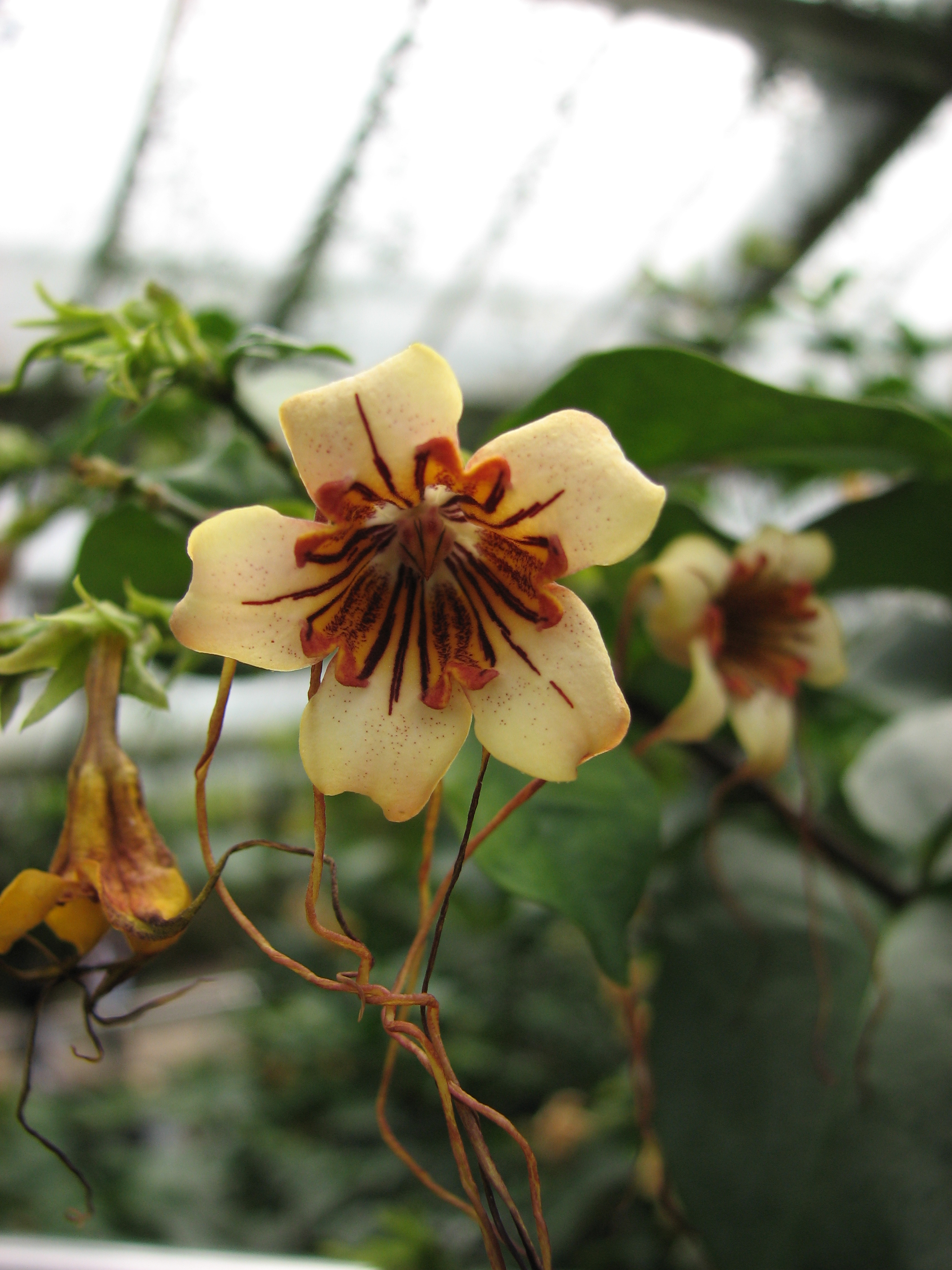
