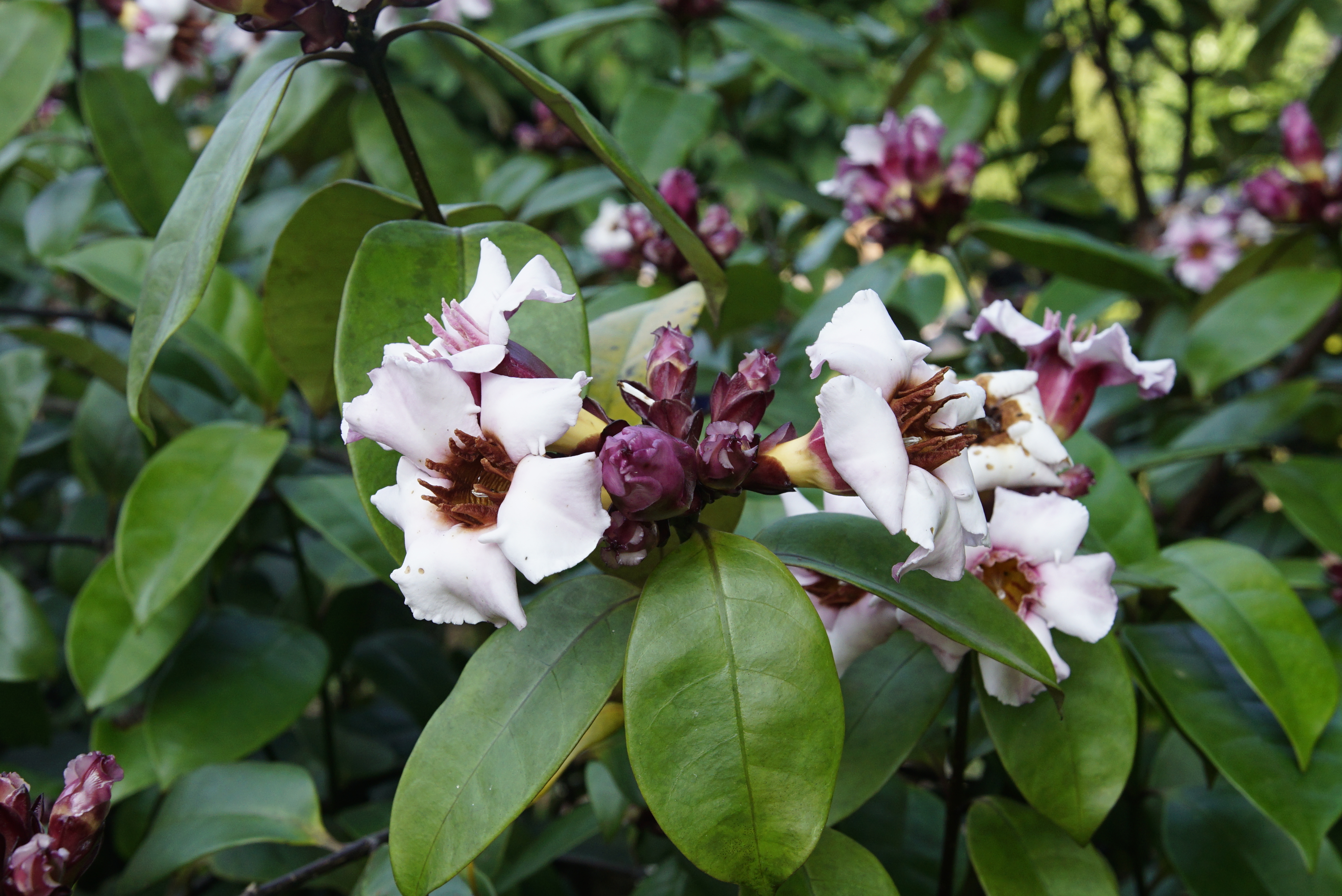

Scientific classification
- Kingdom: Plantae
- Clade: Tracheophytes
- Clade: Angiosperms
- Clade: Eudicots
- Clade: Asterids
- Order: Gentianales
- Family: Apocynaceae
- Genus: Strophanthus
- Species: S. gratus

Binomial name
- Strophanthus gratus (Wall. and Hook.) Baill.

Synonyms
- Roupellia grata Wall. & Hook.; Roupalia grata (Wall. & Hook.) T.Moore & Ayres; Strophanthus stanleyanus Hook.; Strophanthus glaber Cornu ex Holmes; Nerium guineense Brongn. ex Perrot & Vogt; Strophanthus chopraie M.R.Almeida

= Strophanthus gratus =

Species of plant

Strophanthus gratus is a plant in the dogbane family Apocynaceae.

== Description ==
Strophanthus gratus is a woody liana that can grow up to 25 metres (80 ft), with a trunk diameter of up to 10 centimetres (4 in). Its fragrant flowers feature a white corolla, topped by red or purple colour, with pink corona lobes.

== Distribution and habitat ==
Strophanthus gratus is native to tropical Africa: from Senegal in the west, east and south to the Democratic Republic of the Congo. It is naturalized in Taiwan and also Trinidad and Tobago.

== Uses ==
Strophanthus gratus has been used in local traditional medicine: ouabain derived from the plant's seeds is used as a treatment for heart failure. It has also been used as arrow poison.
