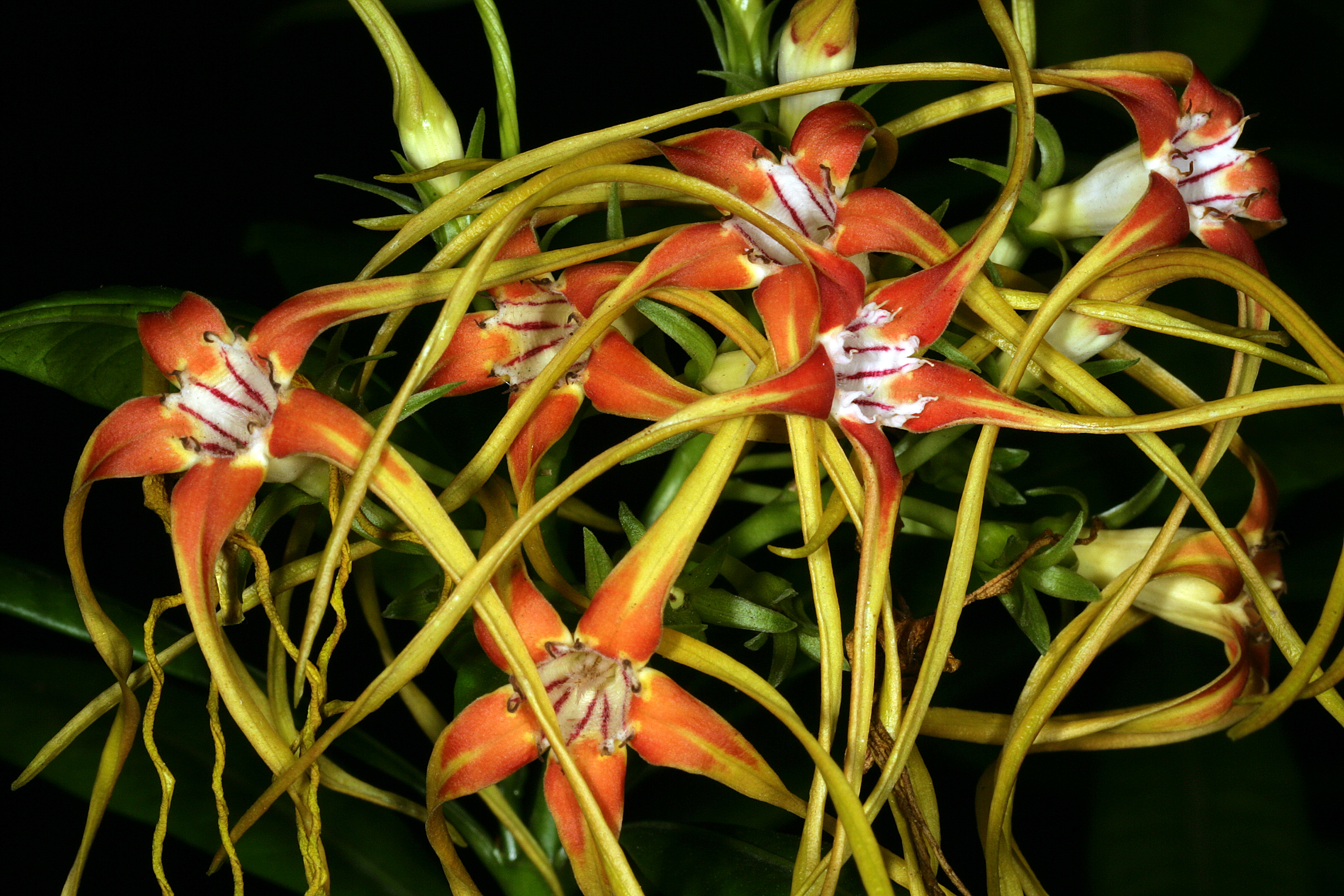
- Strophanthus speciosus

Scientific classification
- Kingdom: Plantae
- Clade: Embryophytes
- Clade: Tracheophytes
- Clade: Angiosperms
- Clade: Eudicots
- Clade: Asterids
- Order: Gentianales
- Family: Apocynaceae
- Subfamily: Apocynoideae
- Tribe: Nerieae
- Genus: Strophanthus; DC., 1802

Synonyms
- Cercocoma Wall. ex G.Don; Christya Ward & Harv.; Faskia Lour. ex B.A.Gomes; Roupalia T.Moore & Ayres; Roupellia Wall. & Hook. ex Benth.; Roupellina (Baill.) Pichon; Zygonerion Baill.

= Strophanthus =

Genus of plants

Strophanthus is a genus of flowering plants in the family Apocynaceae, first described as a genus in 1802. It is native primarily to tropical Africa, extending to South Africa, with a few species in Asia from southern India to New Guinea and southern China. The genus name is a compound of the Greek words στρόφος (stróphos) "twisted cord" and ἄνθος (ánthos) "flower", in reference to the corolla lobes which, in some species - notably S. petersianus (see below) - resemble long twisted ribbons or threads and can reach a length of 30–35 cm. This trait, in addition to colouring involving combinations of bright pinks, purples and oranges, combine to make the flowers among the most ornamental in the plant kingdom.

The genus includes vines, shrubs, and small trees. The leaves are opposite or whorled, simple broad lanceolate, 2–20 cm long, with an entire margin.

Several African tribes used Strophanthus as the principal ingredient in arrow poison. After dipping the arrows of their hunting weapons into a strong concentration of the ingredient, the effect was to stun their prey.

Plants from this genus produce toxic alkaloids and cardiac glycosides g-strophanthin (syn. ouabain), k-strophanthin, and e-strophanthin. As ordinarily administered, the drug acts on the heart before influencing any other organ or tissue. Indeed, often no other effect may be observed. Some of the chemicals in the plants are used to produce the drug ouabain, which was taken as a cardiac stimulant to treat heart failure and sometimes g-strophanthin is advocated as an alternative treatment to more contemporary practices. The effect is similar to that of the drug digoxin, which is produced from Digitalis purpurea.

== Gallery ==
=== Flowers ===
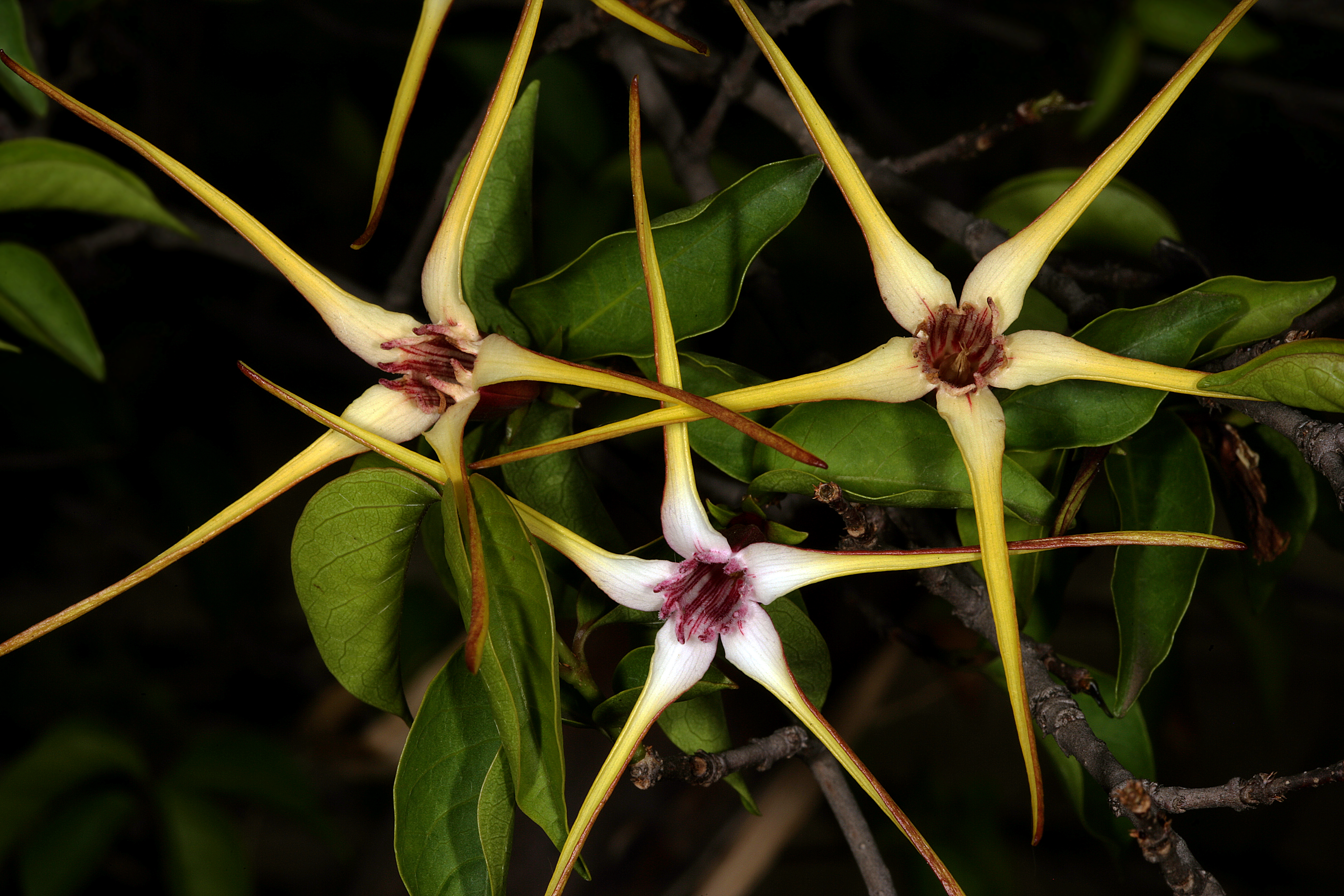
Strophanthus amboensis

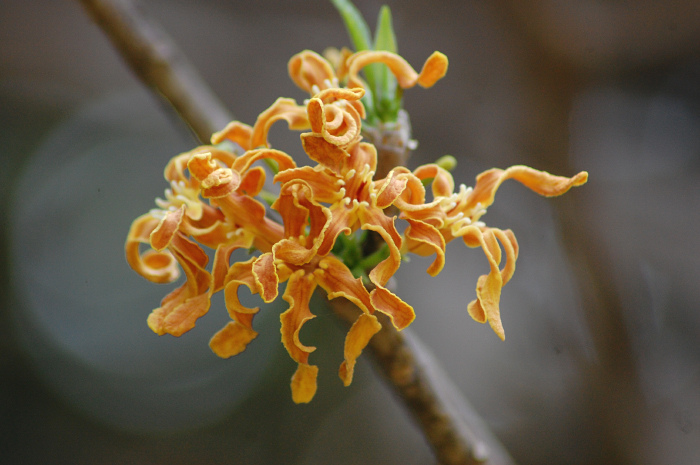
Strophanthus boivinii

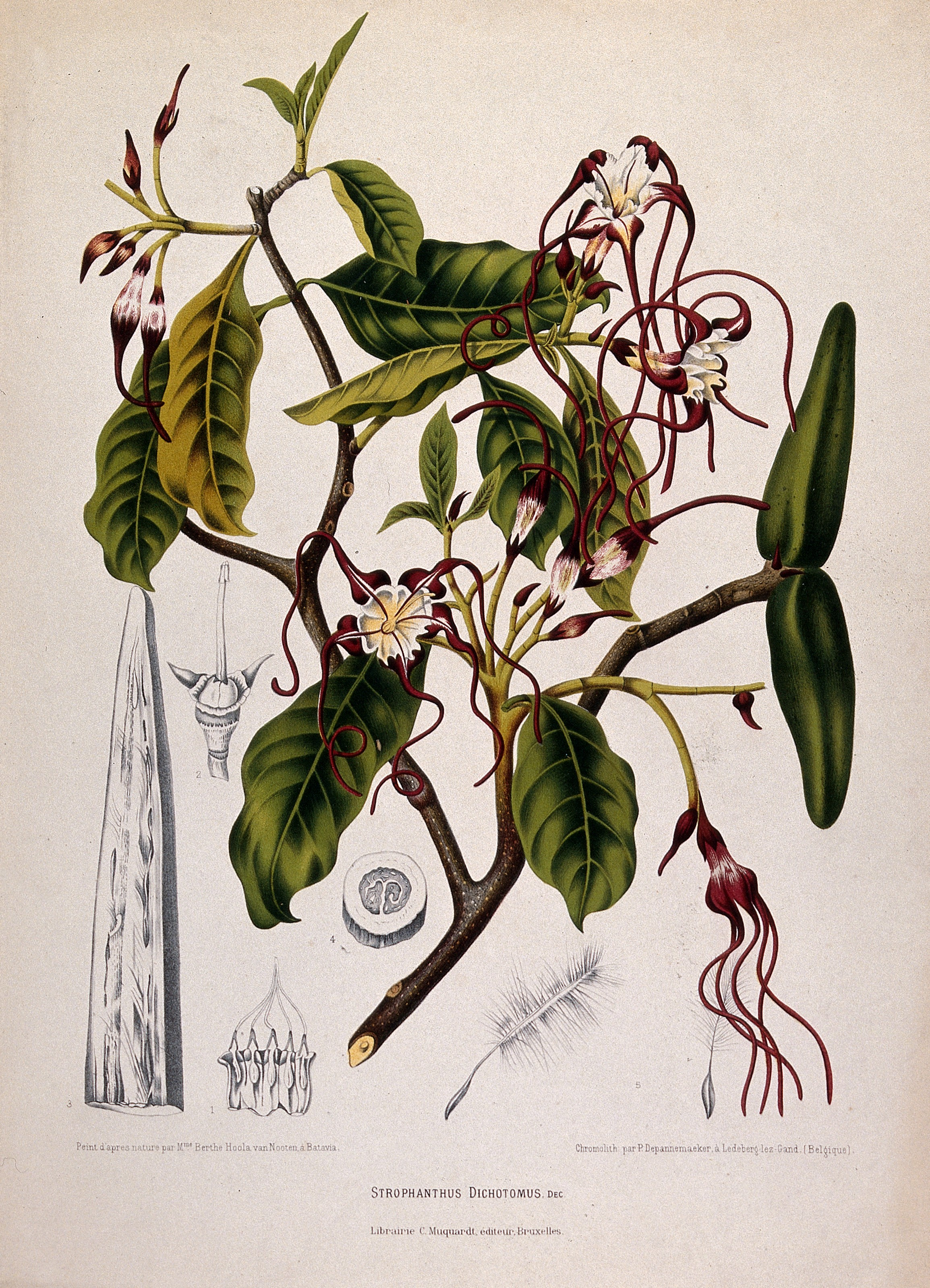
Strophanthus caudatus (coloured plate)

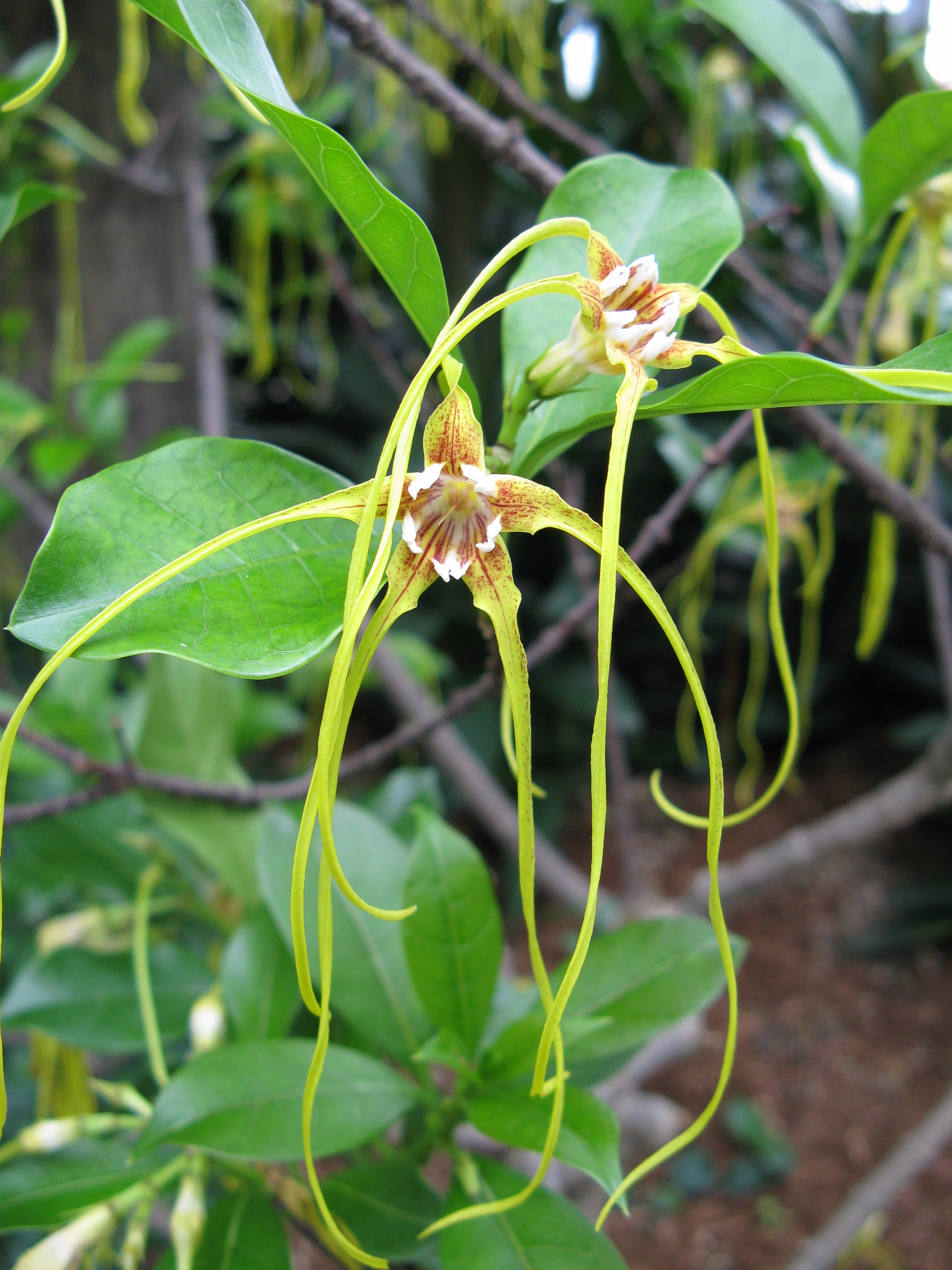
Strophanthus divaricatus

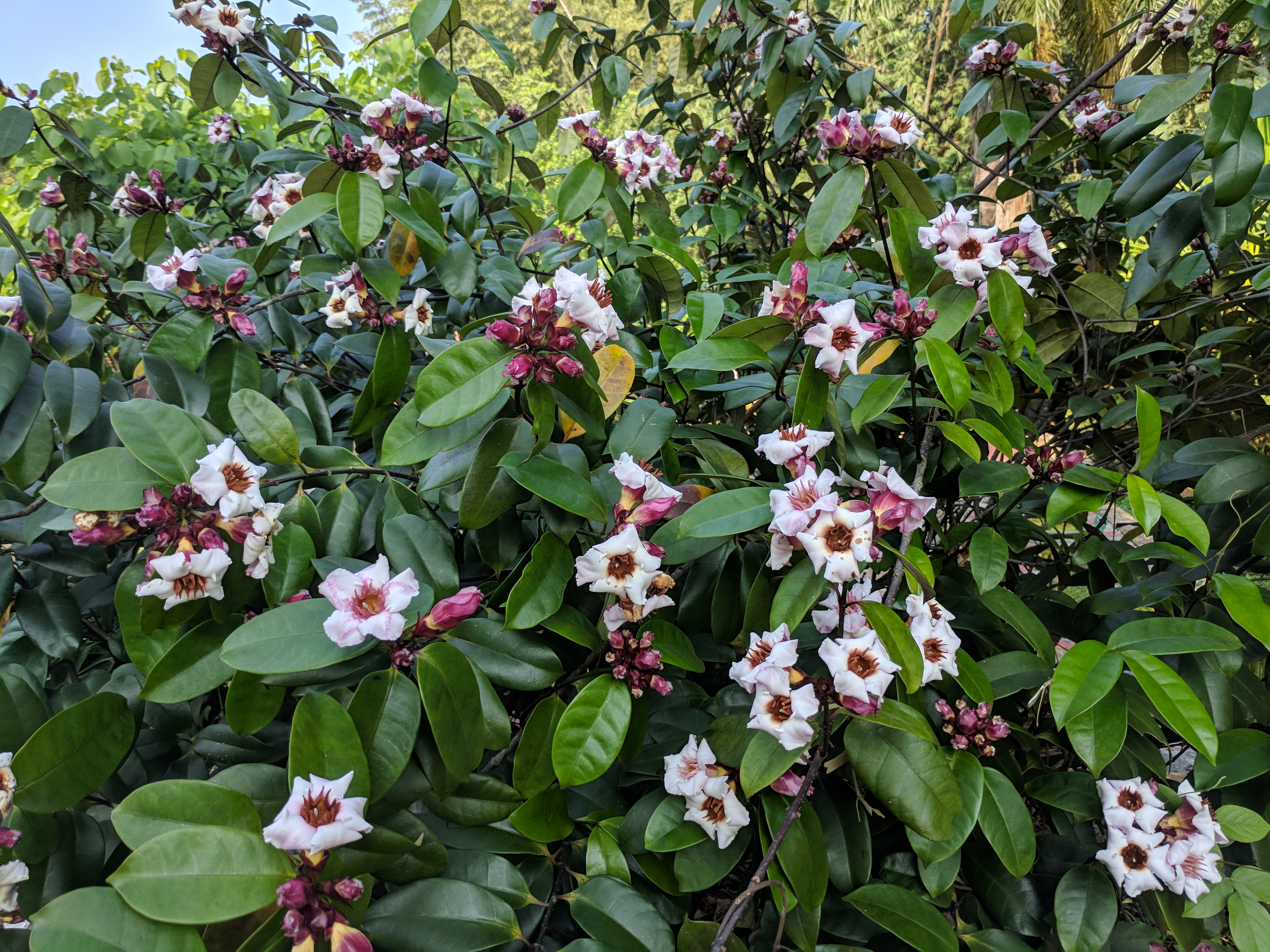
Strophanthus gratus

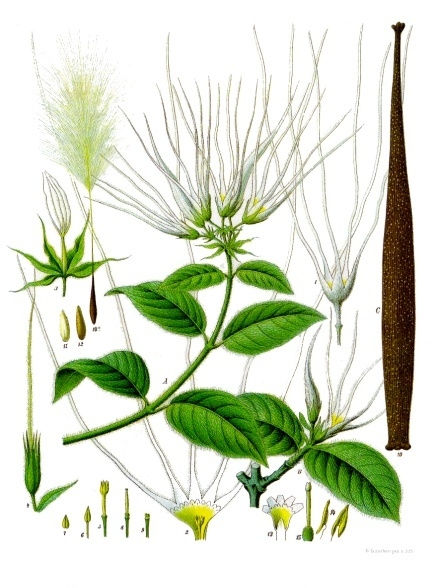
Strophanthus hispidus (coloured plate)

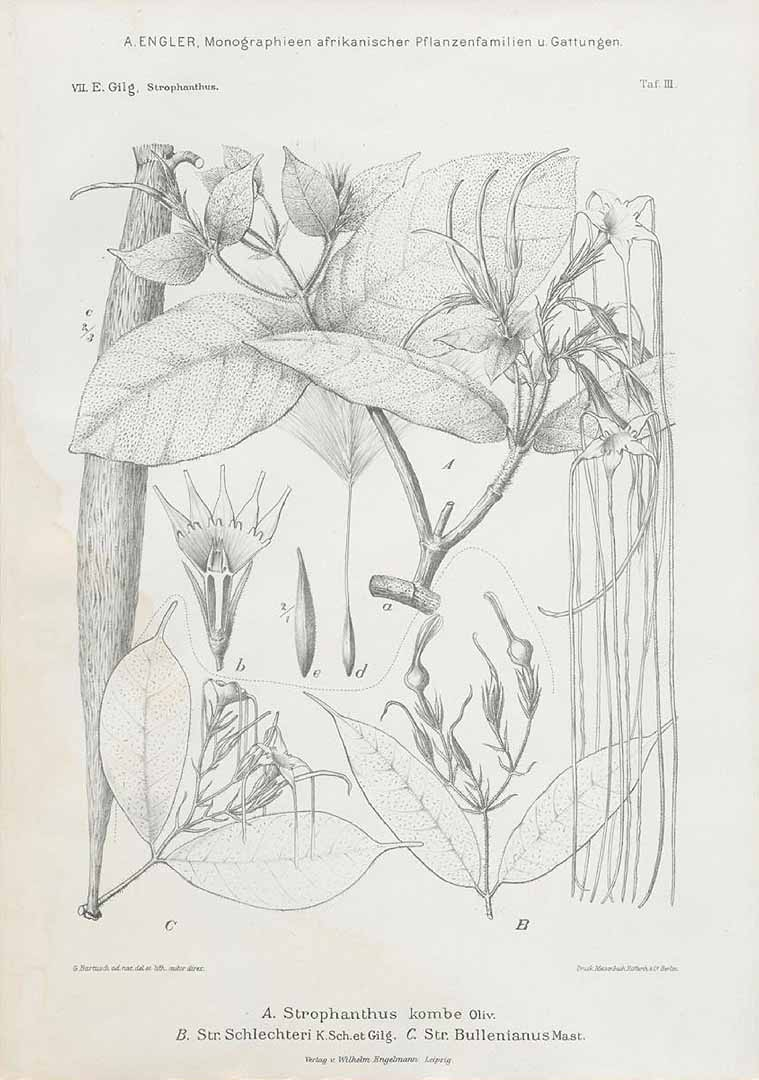
Strophanthus kombe (botanical drawing)

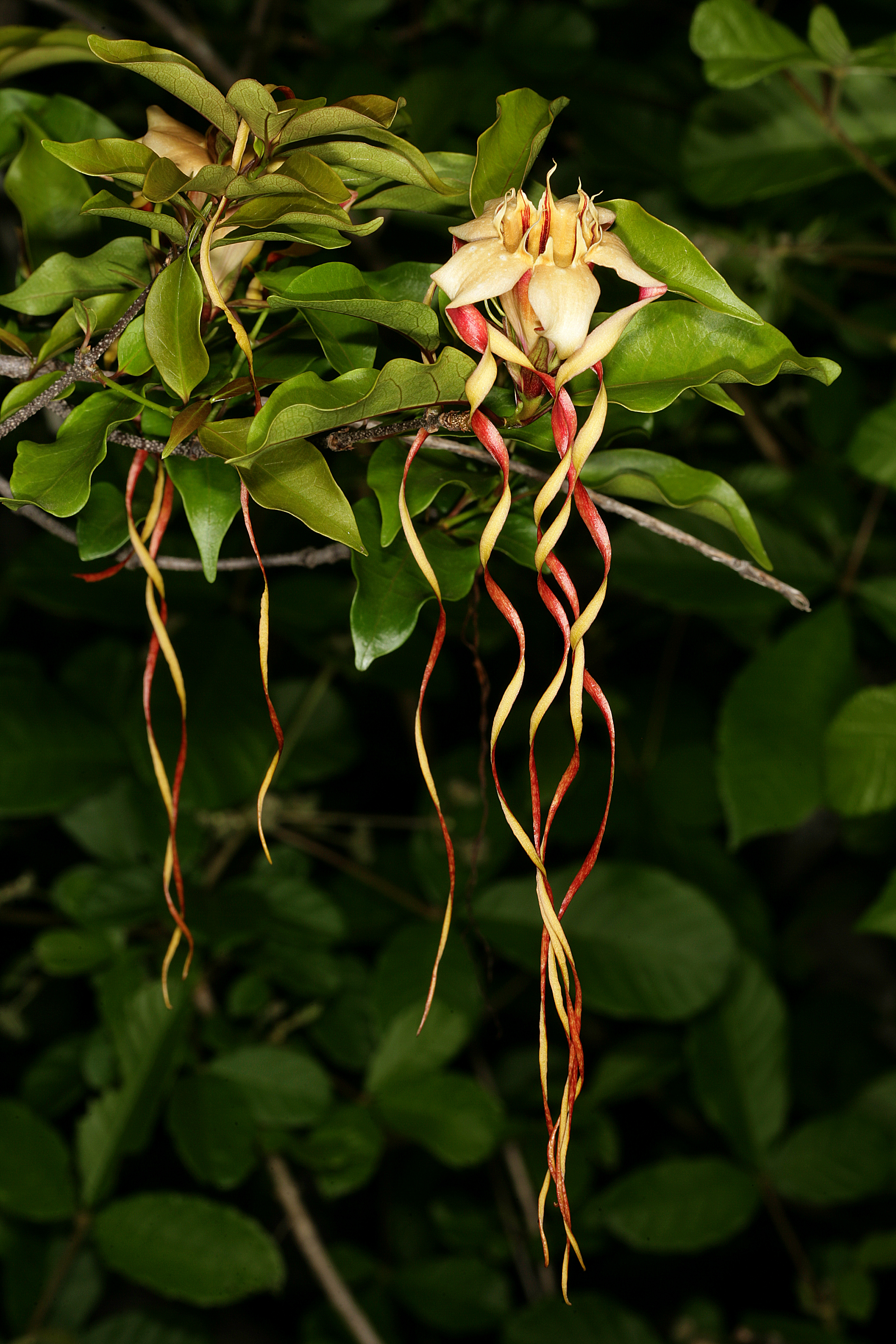
Strophanthus petersianus

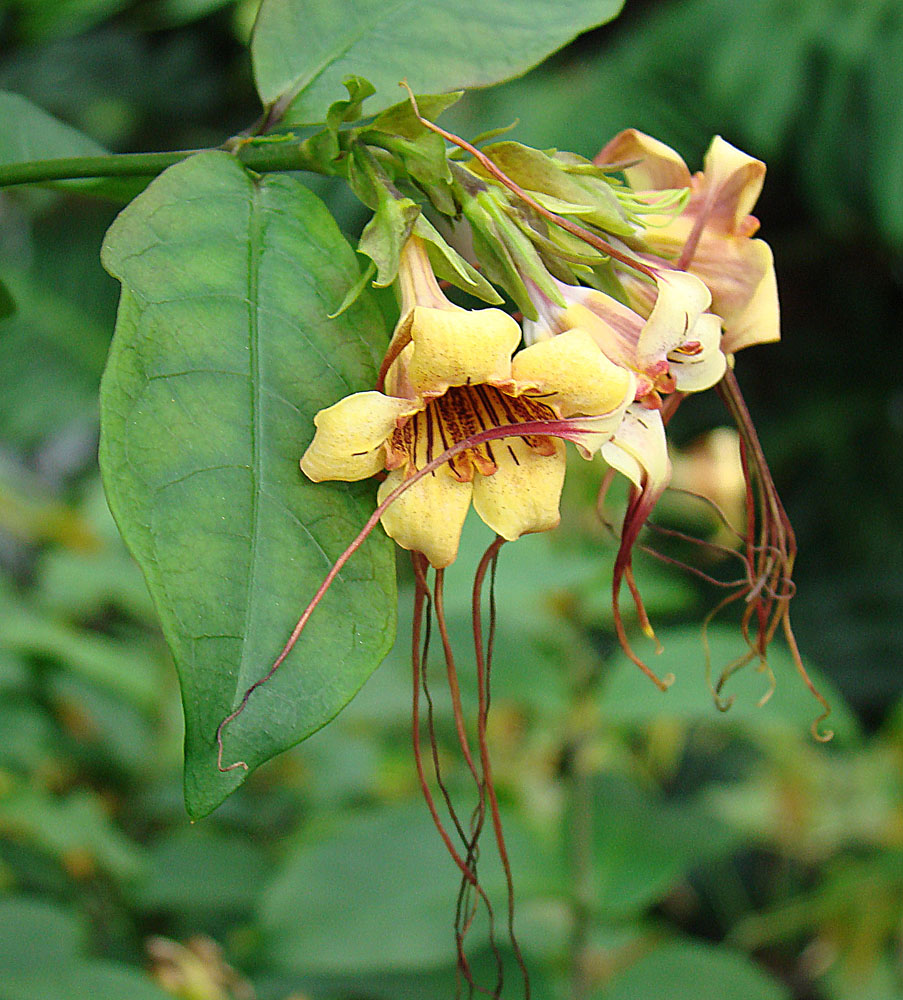
Strophanthus preussii

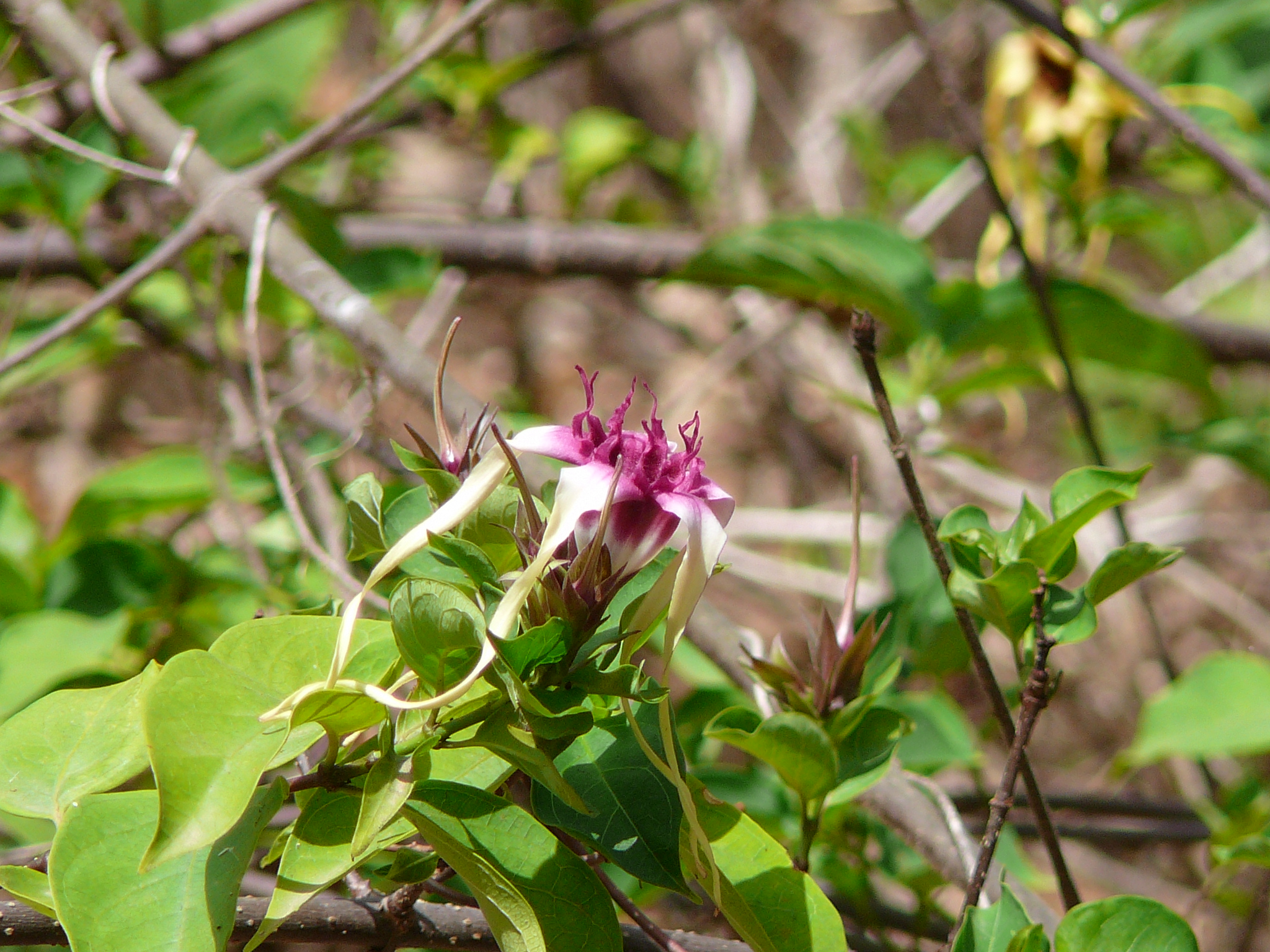
Strophanthus sarmentosus

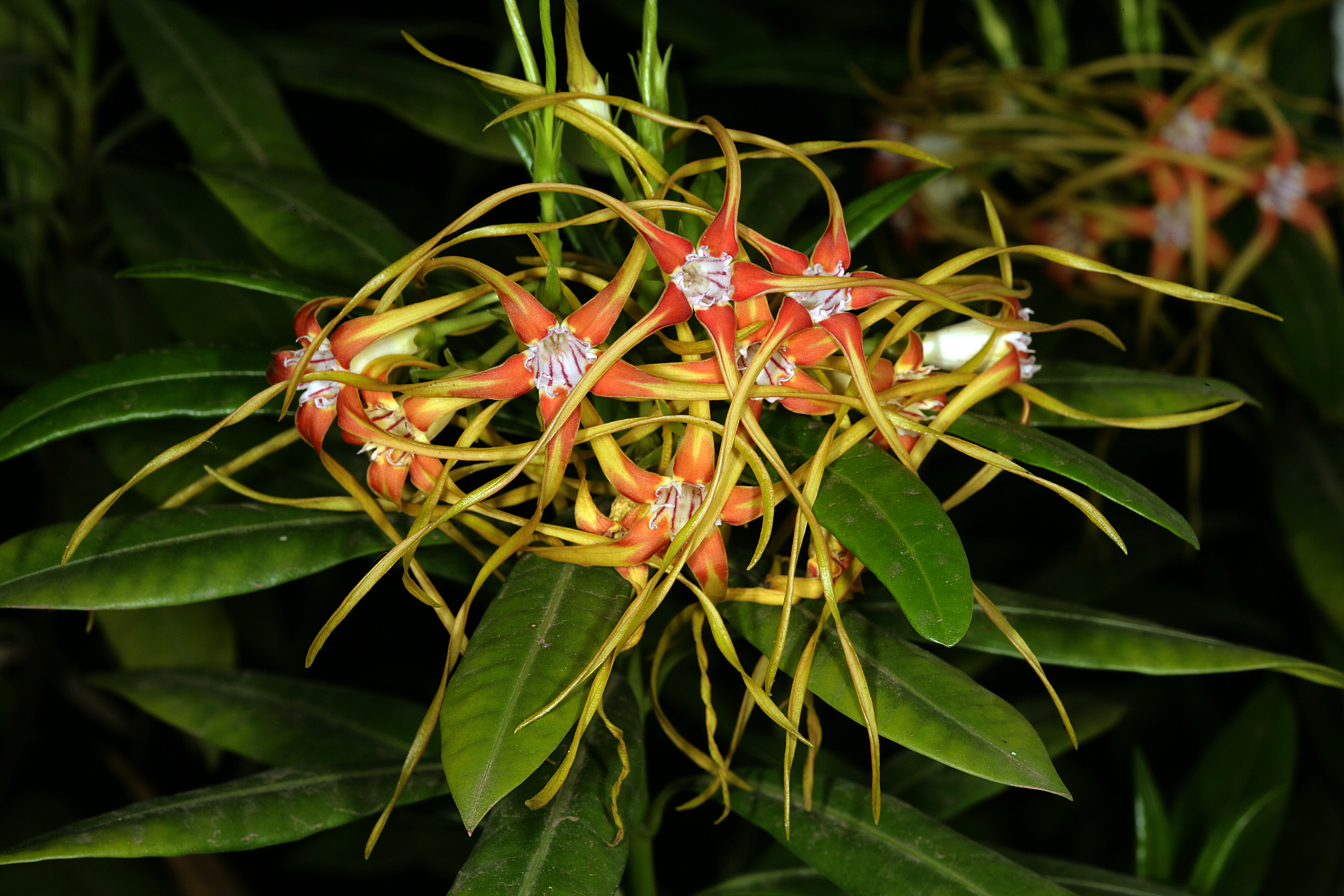
Strophanthus speciosus

Species

- Strophanthus amboensis - Zaïre to Namibia
- Strophanthus arnoldianus - Zaïre
- Strophanthus barteri - Liberia to Gabon
- Strophanthus bequaertii - E Zaïre, Rwanda, SW Uganda
- Strophanthus boivinii - Madagascar
- Strophanthus bullenianus - Zaïre to Nigeria
- Strophanthus caudatus - S China, SE Asia, New Guinea
- Strophanthus congoensis - Zaïre to Cameroon
- Strophanthus courmontii - Kenya to Zimbabwe
- Strophanthus demeusei - Zaïre
- Strophanthus divaricatus - S China, Vietnam, Laos
- Strophanthus eminii - Zaïre, Zambia, Tanzania
- Strophanthus gardeniiflorus - S Zaïre, N Zambia, E Angola
- Strophanthus gerrardii - Mozambique, Eswatini, NE South Africa
- Strophanthus gracilis - Nigeria, Cameroon, Gabon
- Strophanthus gratus - Zaïre to Senegal
- Strophanthus hispidus - Senegal to Uganda to Angola
- Strophanthus holosericeus - S Zaïre, N Zambia
- Strophanthus hypoleucos - Mozambique, Tanzania
- Strophanthus kombe - Kenya to Namibia
- Strophanthus ledienii - W Zaïre, NW Angola
- Strophanthus luteolus - Mozambique, South Africa
- Strophanthus mirabilis - Somalia, Kenya
- Strophanthus mortehanii - Zaïre to Cameroon
- Strophanthus nicholsonii - Mozambique, Malawi, Zambia, Zimbabwe
- Strophanthus parviflorus - Cameroon to Angola
- Strophanthus perakensis - Indochina, Perak in Malaysia
- Strophanthus petersianus - Kenya to KwaZulu-Natal
- Strophanthus preussii - Liberia to Tanzania to Angola
- Strophanthus puberulus - Sumbawa in Indonesia
- Strophanthus sarmentosus - Liberia to Uganda to Angola
- Strophanthus singaporianus - W Malaysia, Singapore, Borneo
- Strophanthus speciosus - South Africa, Eswatini, Zimbabwe
- Strophanthus thollonii - Nigeria, Cameroon, Gabon, Ivory Coast†
- Strophanthus vanderijstii - Zaïre, Angola
- Strophanthus wallichii - S China, Himalayas, Indochina, W Malaysia
- Strophanthus welwitschii - Tanzania to Angola
- Strophanthus wightianus - S India
- Strophanthus zimmermannianus - Kenya, Tanzania

formerly included in genus

- Strophanthus aambe = Papuechites aambe
- Strophanthus balansae = Anodendron paniculatum
- Strophanthus jackianus = Wrightia dubia
