= Charaxes karkloof =

Karkloof emperor

Scientific classification
- Kingdom: Animalia
- Phylum: Arthropoda
- Clade: Pancrustacea
- Class: Insecta
- Order: Lepidoptera
- Family: Nymphalidae
- Genus: Charaxes
- Species: C. karkloof

Binomial name
- Charaxes karkloof van Someren & Jackson, 1957

Species of butterfly

Charaxes karkloof, the Karkloof emperor, is a butterfly of the family Nymphalidae. It is found in South Africa.

The wingspan is 45–55 mm in males and 50–60 mm in females. Flight period is from October to June.

Larvae feed on Ochna arborea, Ochna natalitia, and Ochna serrulata. Notes on the biology of karkloof are provided by Pringle et al (1994)

== Similar species ==
Charaxes ethalion and Charaxes pondoensis

== Taxonomy ==
Charaxes karkloof is a member of the large species group Charaxes etheocles

== Subspecies ==
Listed alphabetically.

- C. k. capensis van Someren, 1966 .(South Africa: Eastern Cape Province)
- C. k. karkloof van Someren & Jackson, 1957 (South Africa: KwaZulu-Natal, Eastern Cape Province)
- C. k. trimeni Rydon, 1994 (South Africa: Western Cape Province to Saasveld, and Hoogekraal Pass near George)

== Etymology ==
From the type locality Karkloof in Natal
