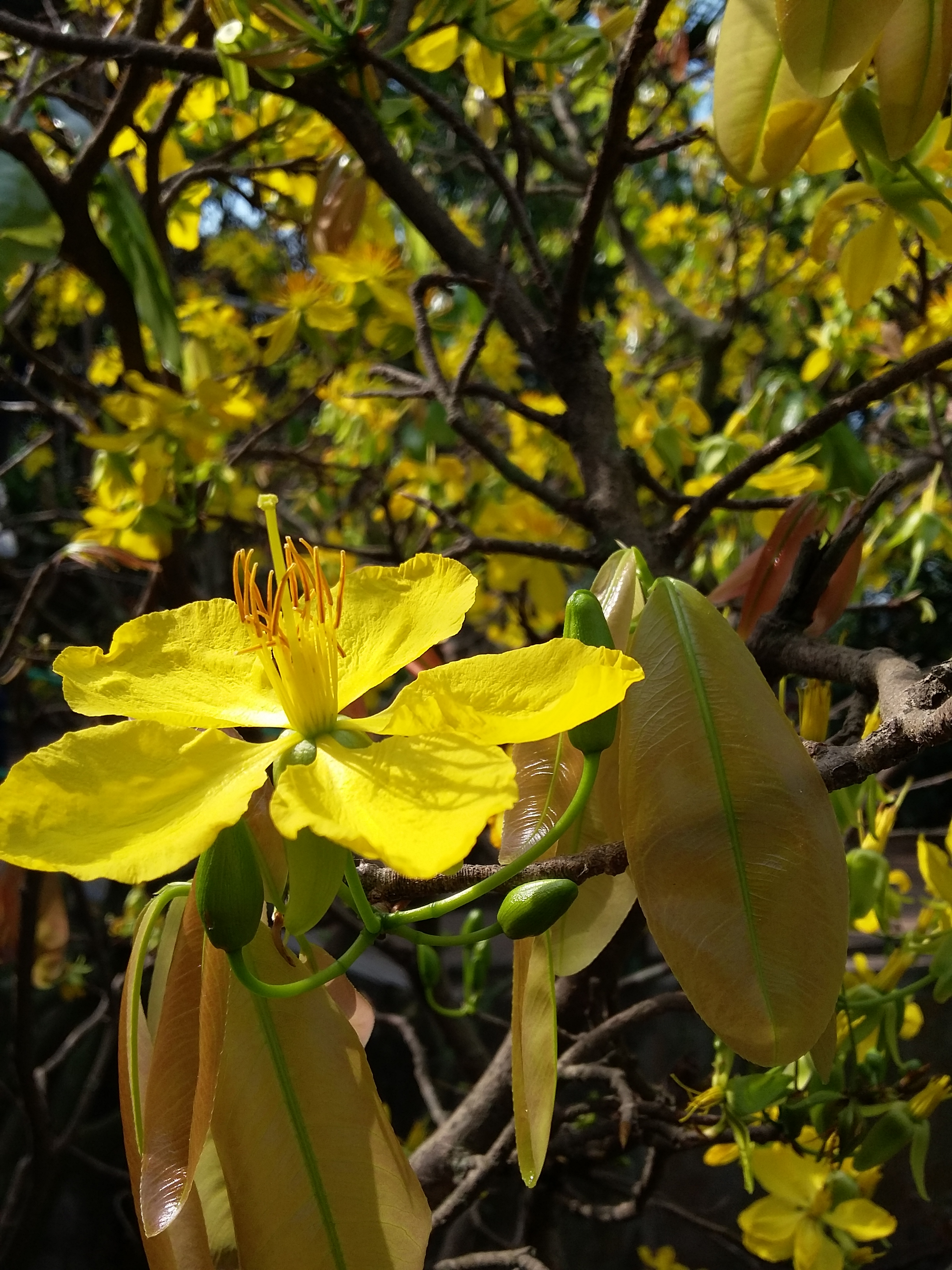

Conservation status
- Least Concern (IUCN 3.1)

Scientific classification
- Kingdom: Plantae
- Clade: Tracheophytes
- Clade: Angiosperms
- Clade: Eudicots
- Clade: Rosids
- Order: Malpighiales
- Family: Ochnaceae
- Genus: Ochna
- Species: O. integerrima

Binomial name
- Ochna integerrima (Lour.) Merr.

= Ochna integerrima =

Species of tree

Ochna integerrima, popularly called yellow Mai flower (Vietnamese: mai vàng, hoa mai, hoàng mai in southern Vietnam, although in the north, mai usually refers to Prunus mume), is a plant species in the genus Ochna (/ˈɒknə/) and family Ochnaceae. In the wild, it is a small tree or shrub species (2-7 m tall). The timing of the yellow flowers of this plant make it very popular in southern Vietnam, where (often bonsai-style) plants are purchased during Tết.

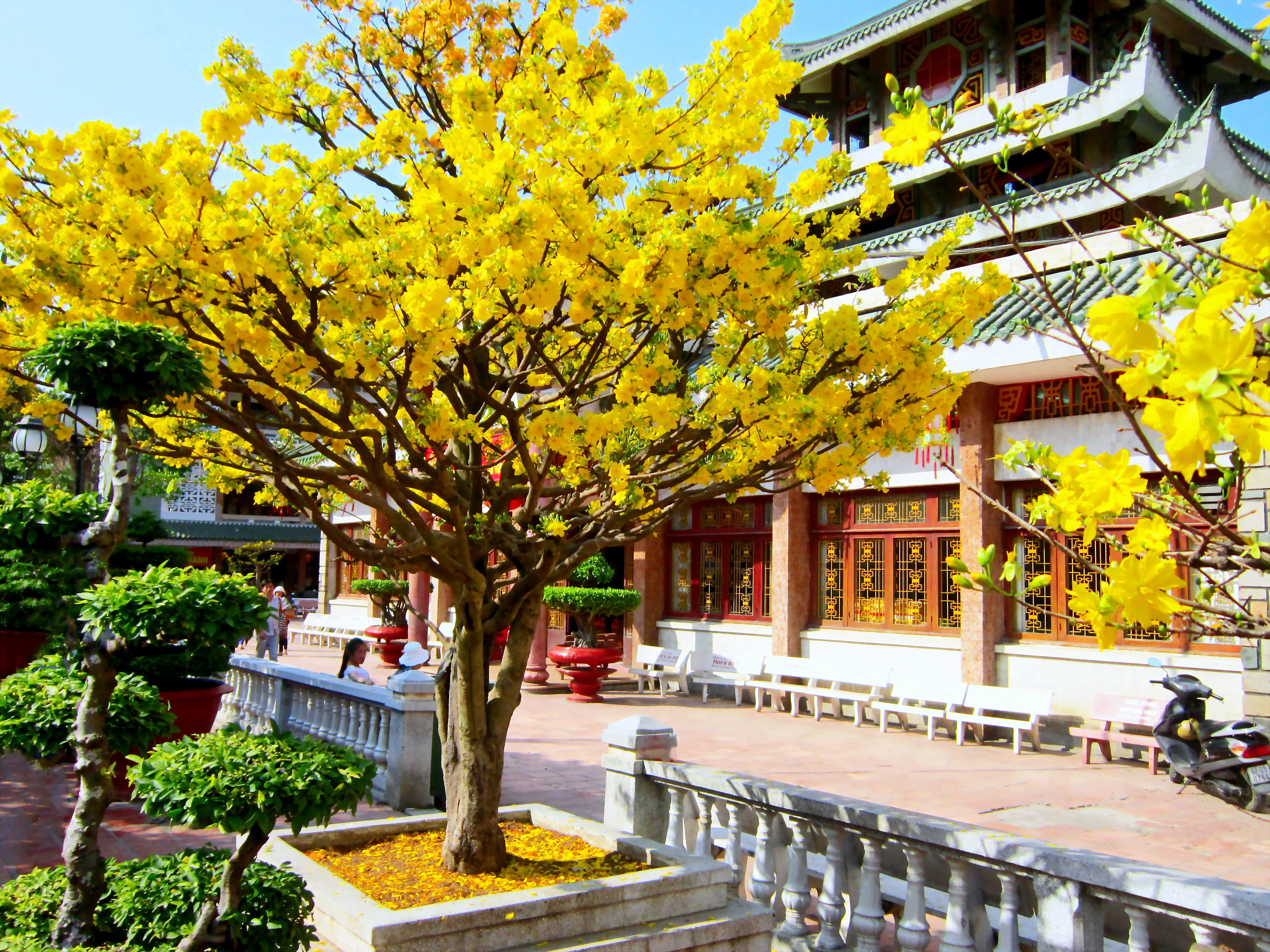
A tree at Bà Chúa Xứ

In Vietnam, the variety of O. integerrima whose flowers have five petals is called mai vàng (yellow mai), whereas mai núi (mountain mai) flowers have between five and nine petals.

In Cambodia, it is called angkea (អង្គា), angkeasel (អង្គាសីល), angkea loeung អង្គាលឿង or kongkea គង្គា.

Ochna integerrima (Thai: ช้างน้าว Chang nao) is the provincial flower of Mukdahan province, Thailand.

== Cultivation ==
Ochna integerrima is both easy to grow and to take care of. Farmers choose good seeds, soak them in water, and sow them in moist soil (either in pots or in a garden). Some practices also include coating the seeds with sugar to help them grow stronger.

Ochna integerrima likes moist and light soil, cannot stand waterlogging. Therefore, it is necessary to grow Ochna integerrima in high places and water them regularly. If growing in pots, pay attention to fertilizing and change the soil every year. To have a beautiful flower pot, we should often pay attention to cutting branches, bending branches, creating a posture to have unique shaped Ochna integerrima pots.

== The legend of Ochna integerrima ==
Vietnamese people have a fairy tale about Ochna integerrima. The story is about a kind and brave girl. She fought a monster to protect the villagers. Unfortunately, she died after the battle. Her bravery touched the gods. So, although she died, every New Year comes, she is revived to visit her family and her village for 9 days. When her parents died, she transformed into a flowering tree. Every time the New Year comes, the flowers bloom brightly like the yellow shirt she usually wears. That is Ochna integerrima.

Vietnamese people believe that, on Tet holiday, Ochna integerrima can banish ghosts throughout the year.

== Gallery ==
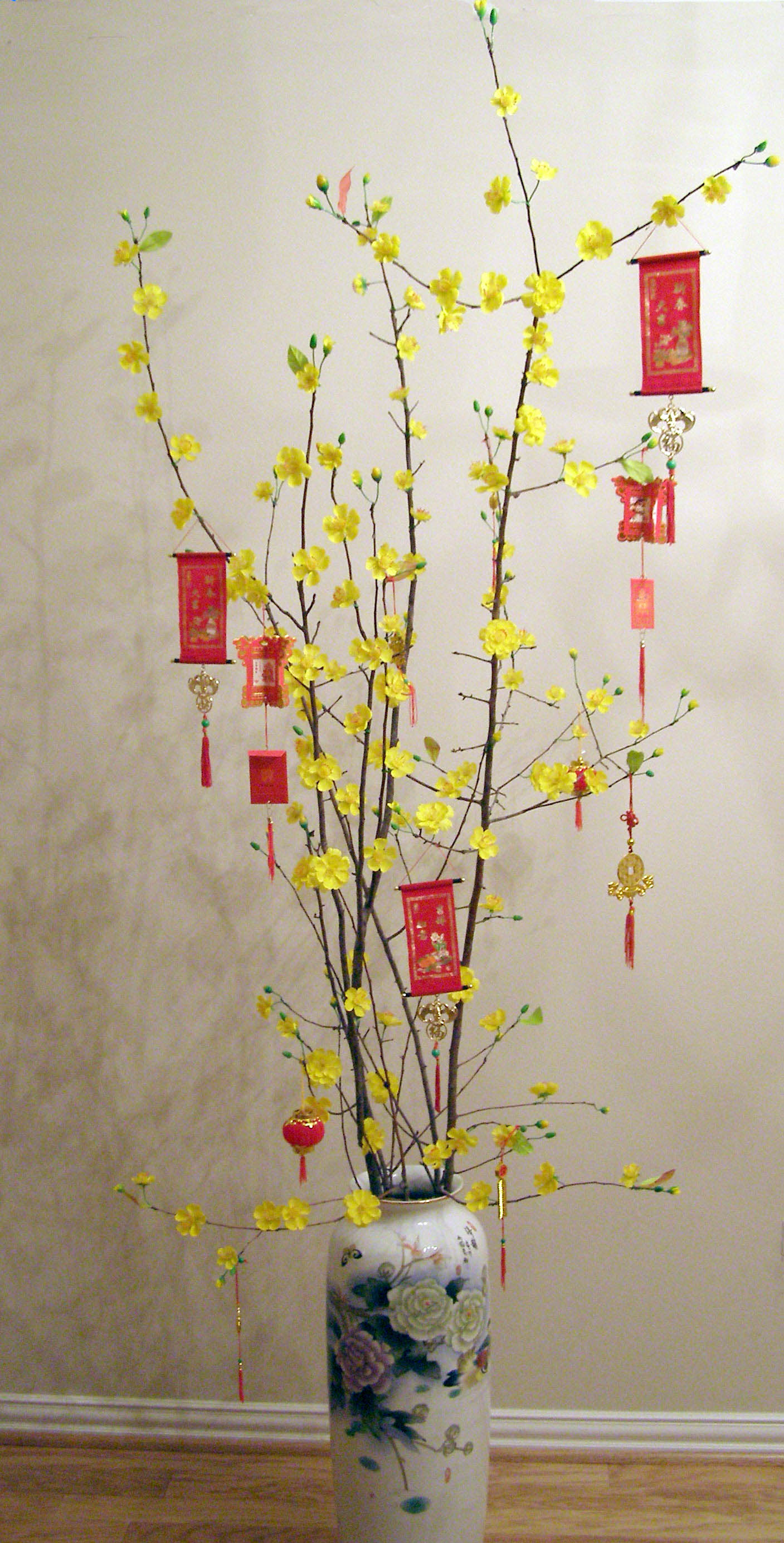
Tết decoration

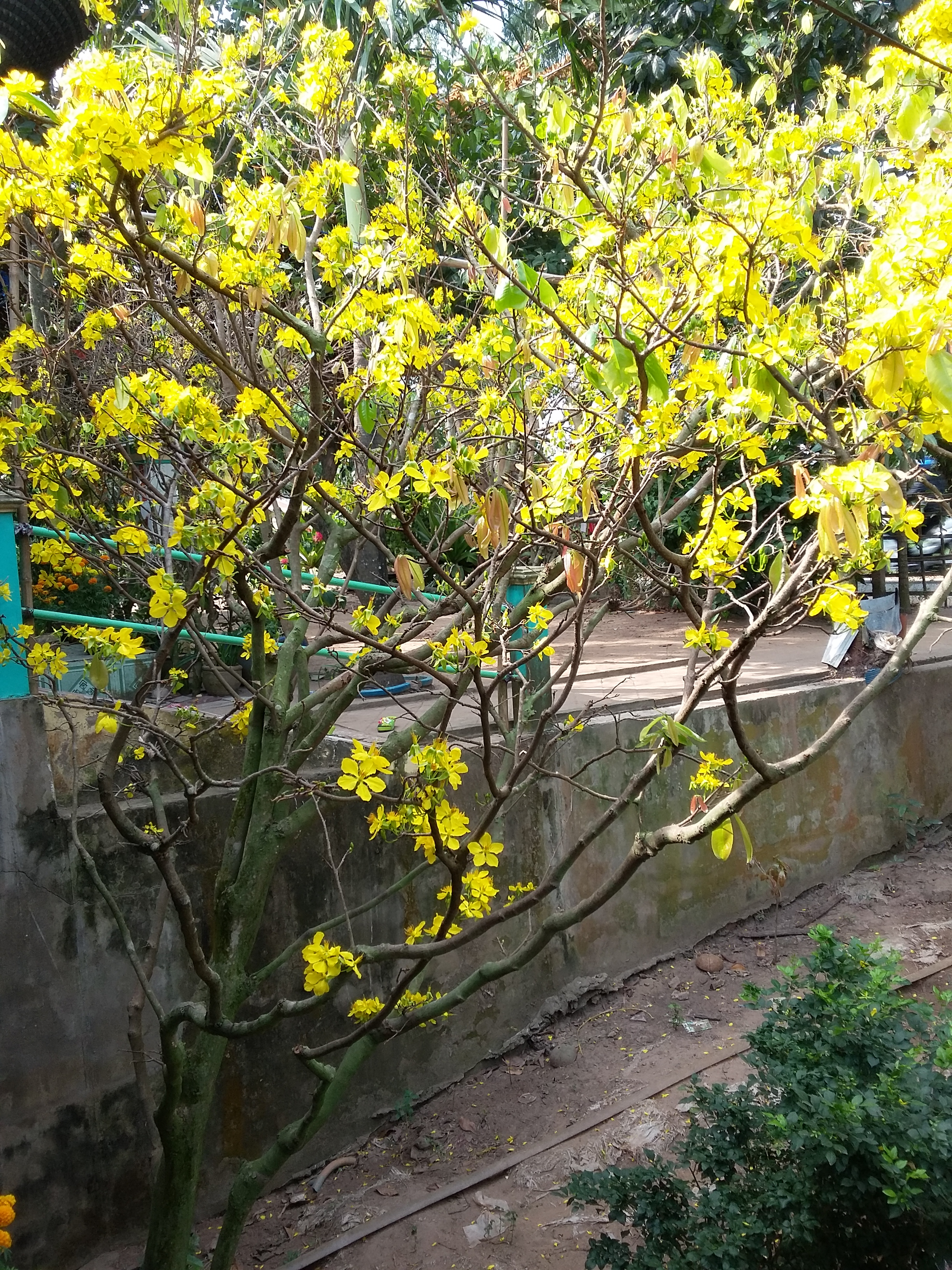
Mai tree

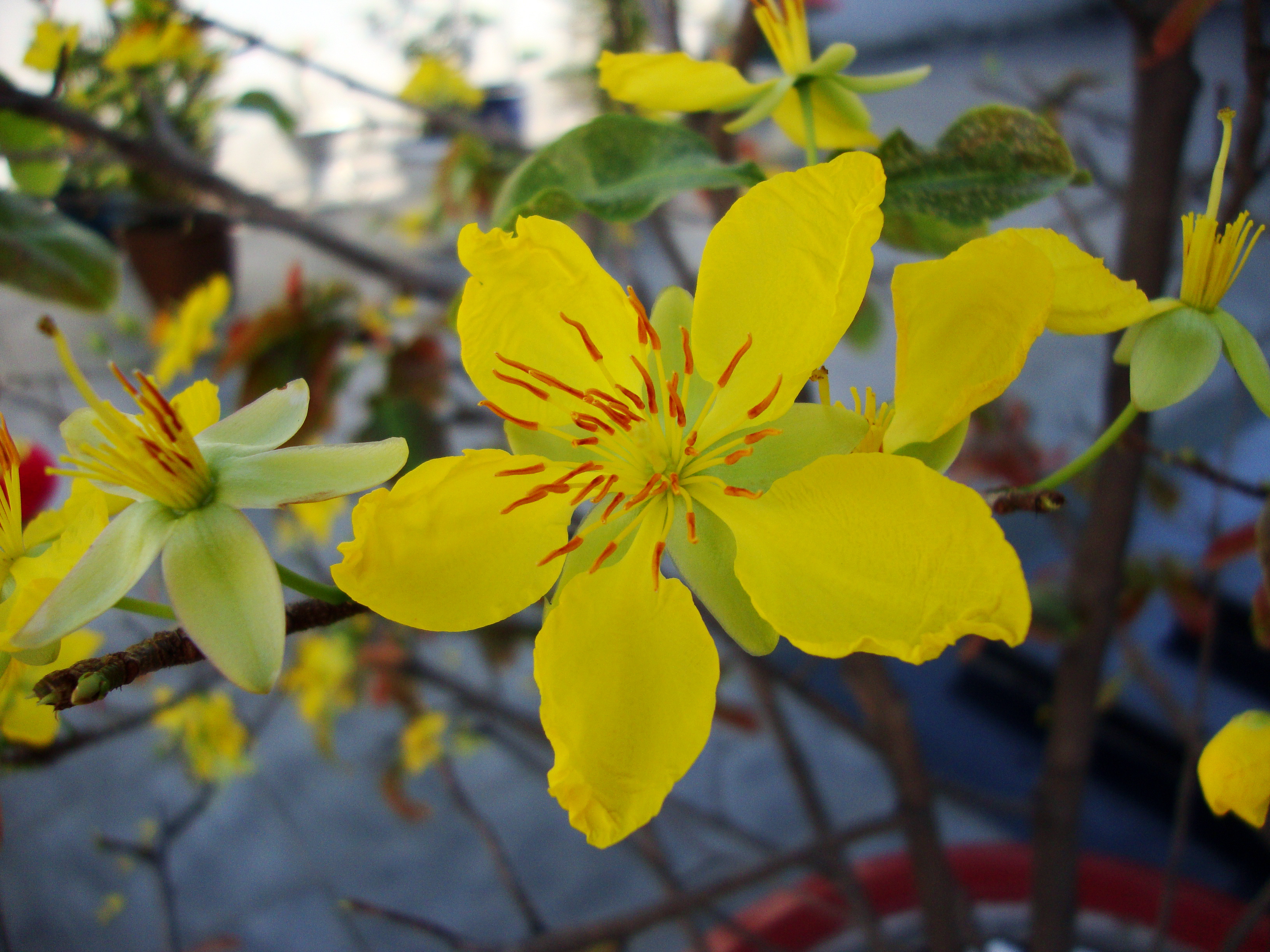
Mai flower with 5 petals

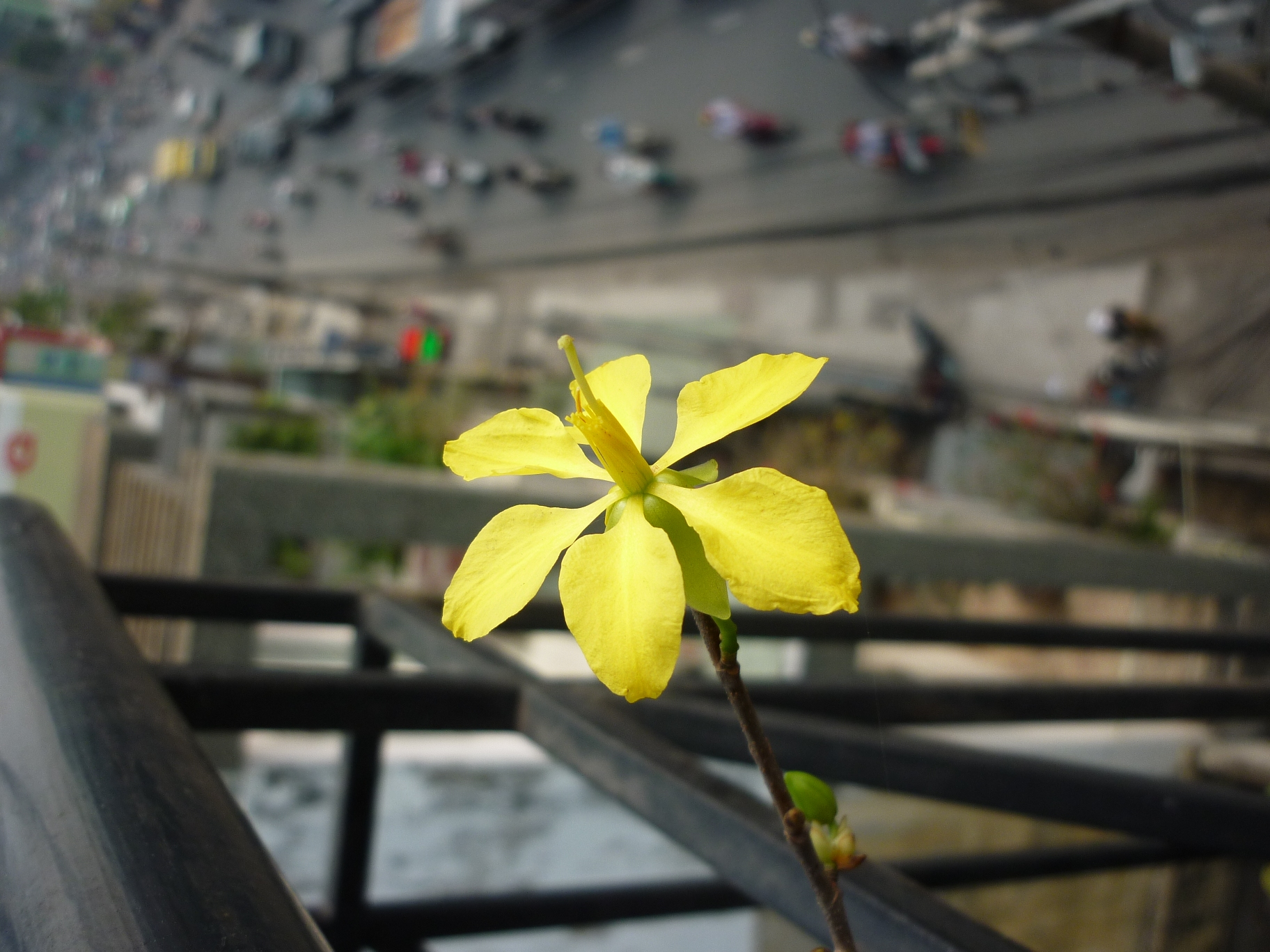
Mai flower with 6 petals

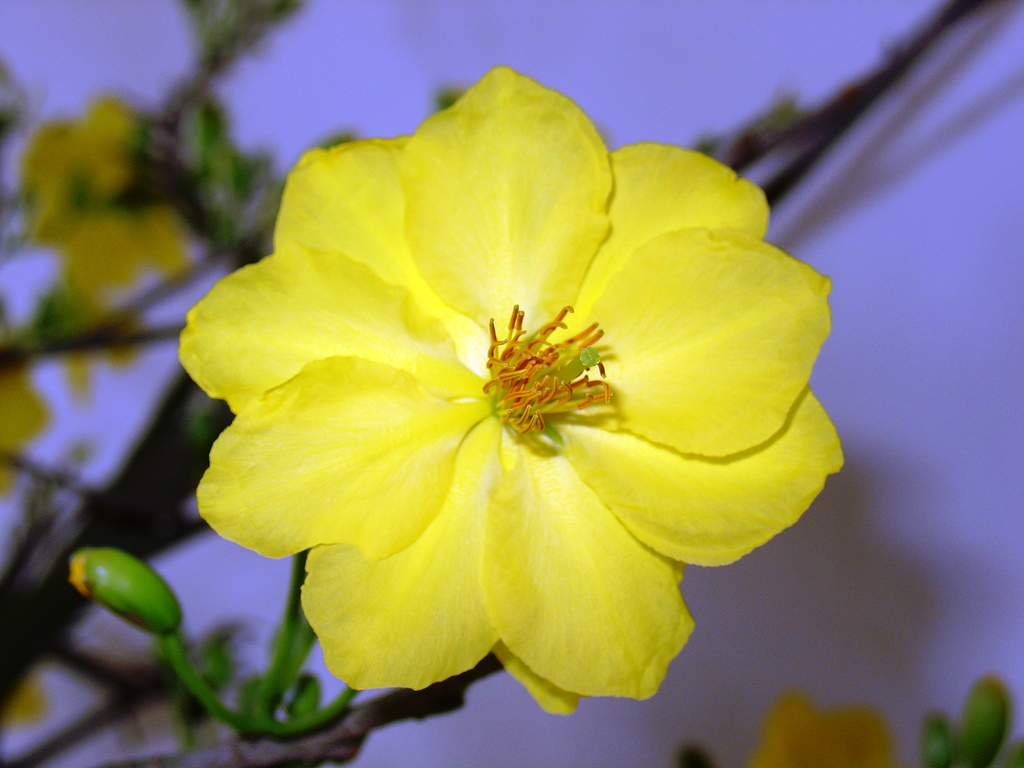
Mai with 10 petals

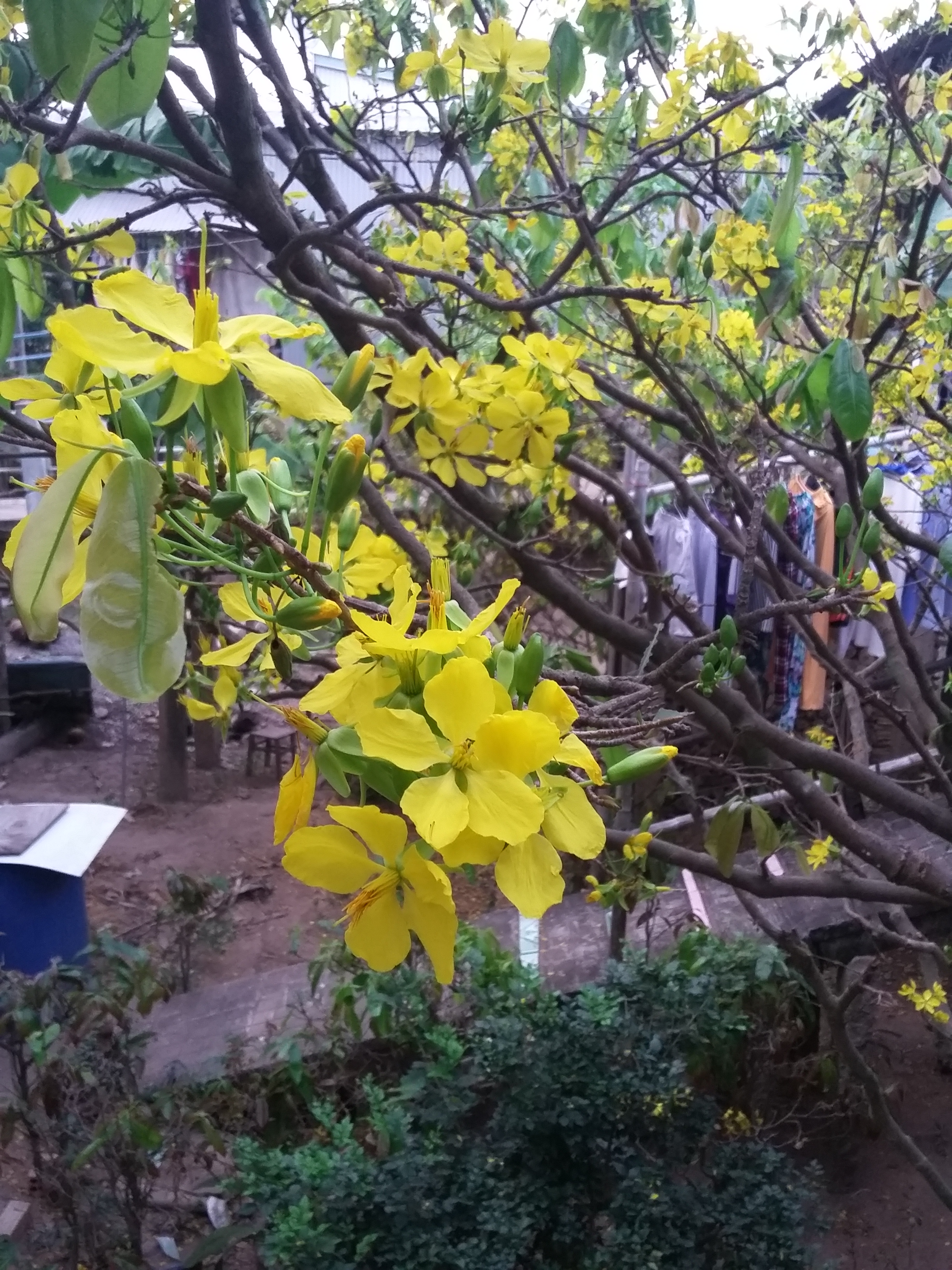
Yellow Mai flowers at Tết

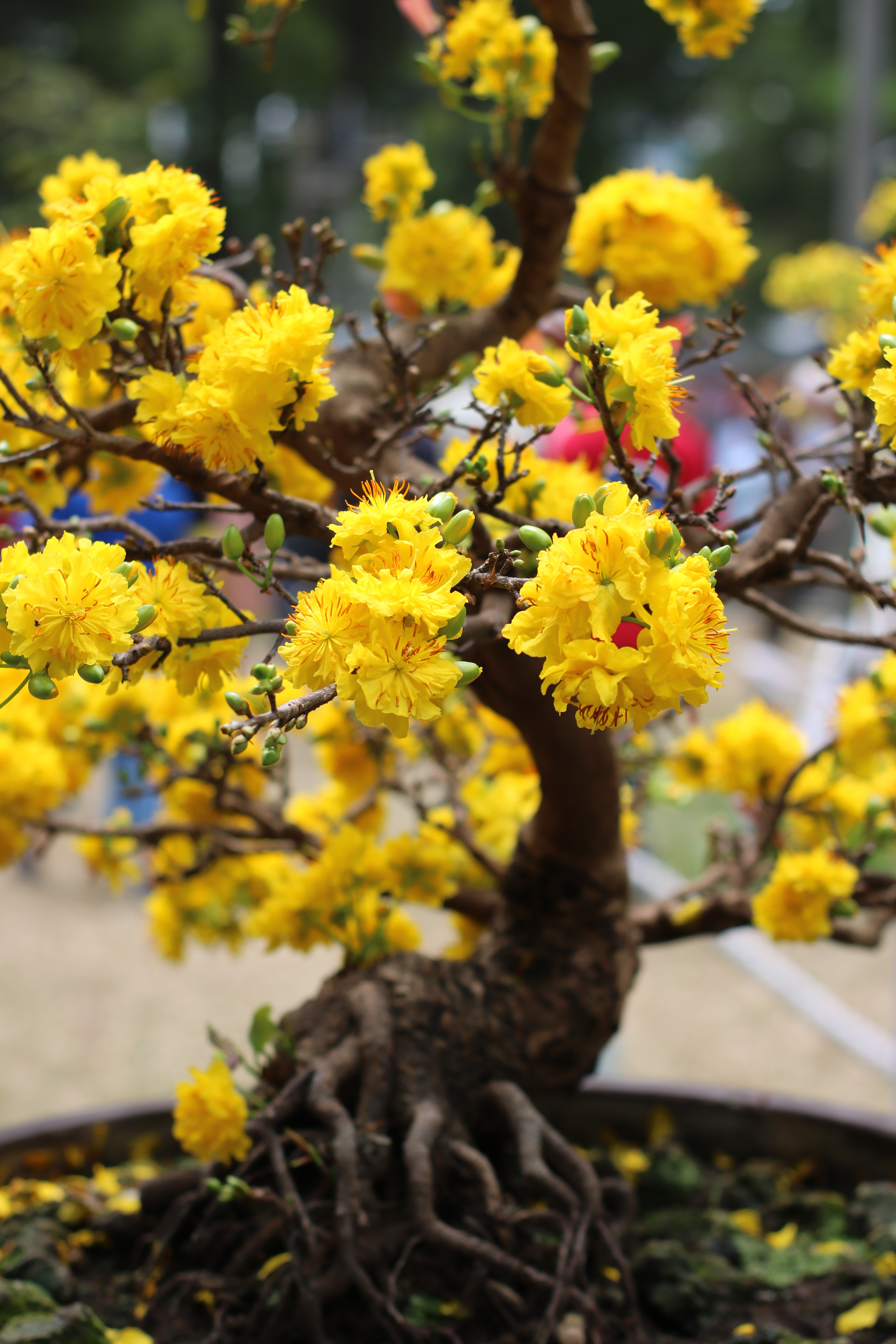

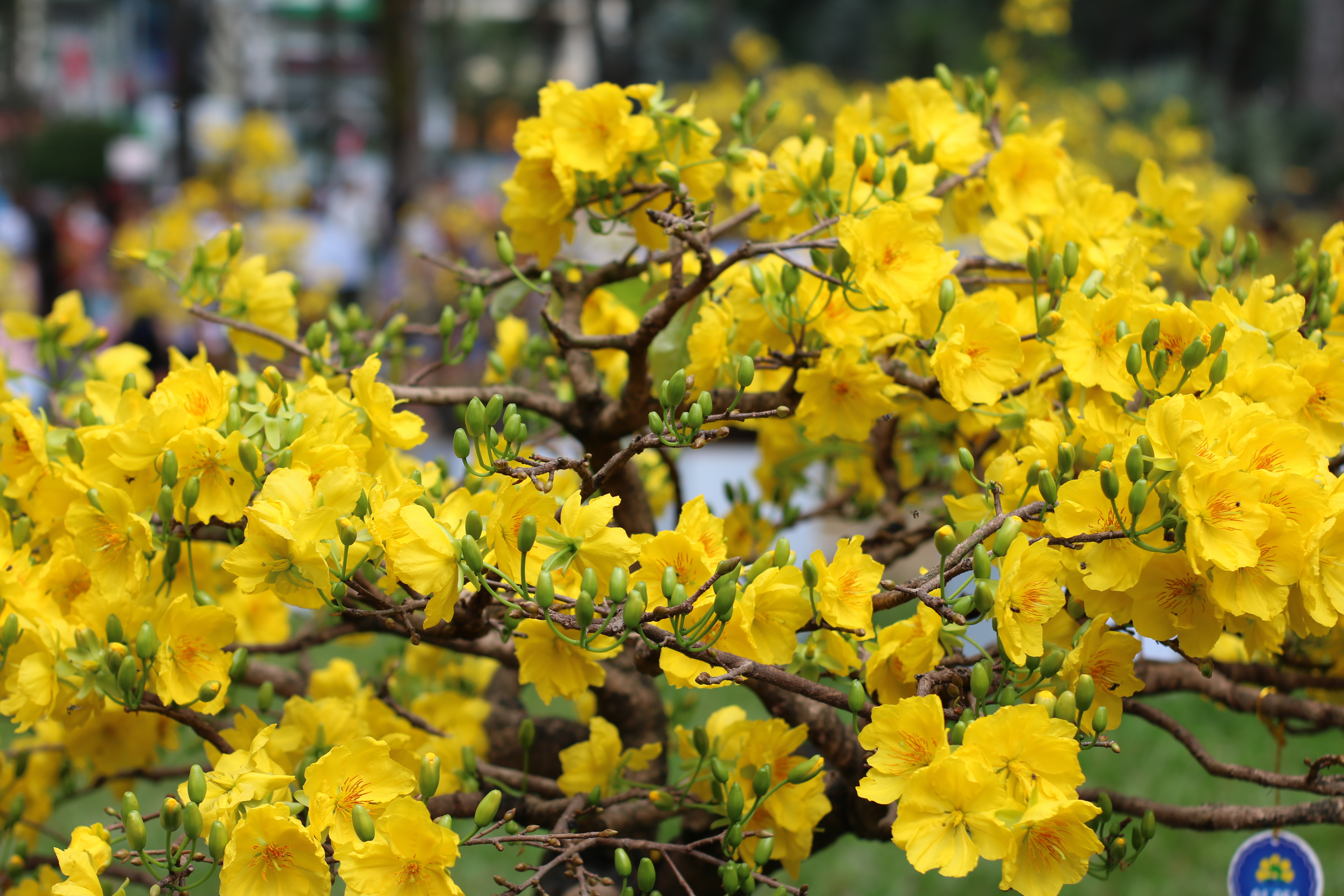

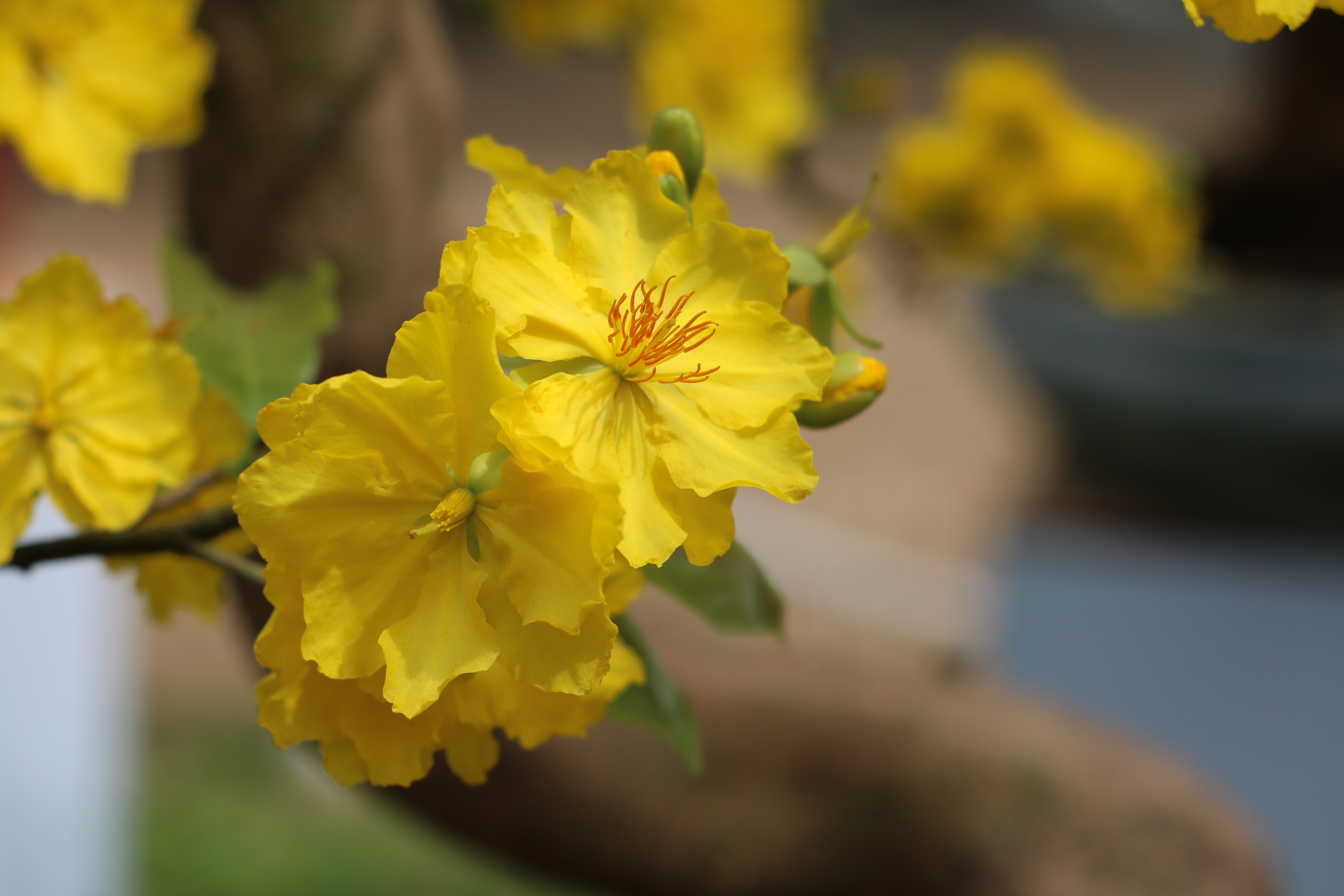

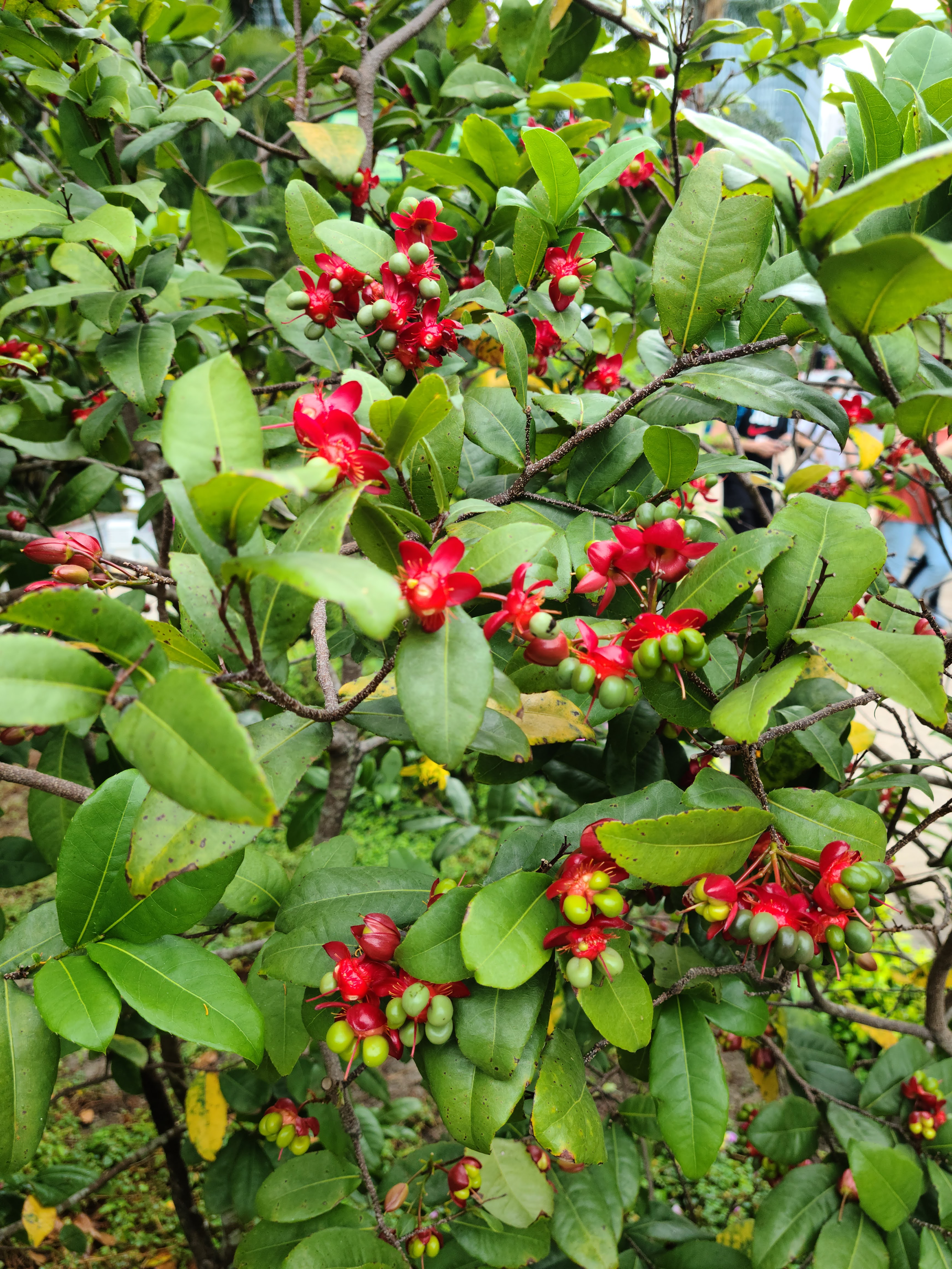
Fruit
