= Ochna macrocalyx =

Scientific classification
- Kingdom: Plantae
- Clade: Embryophytes
- Clade: Tracheophytes
- Clade: Angiosperms
- Clade: Eudicots
- Clade: Rosids
- Order: Malpighiales
- Family: Ochnaceae
- Genus: Ochna
- Species: O. macrocalyx

Binomial name
- Ochna macrocalyx Oliv.

Species of flowering plant

Ochna macrocalyx is a species that grows as a subshrub, shrub or small tree with yellow flowers arranged in axillary racemes and belonging to the family Ochnaceae.

It a medicinal tree in Tanzania as extracts are used to treat gastrointestinal and gynaecological ailments, it is locallty known as Nkatakwa by the Wasambaa people.

== Description ==
Ochna macrocalyx grows as a subshrub or shrub reaching a height of 3 m (9.8 ft) and has been observed sometimes to only show flowers and leaves above the ground. It has greyish to brown bark with a yellow slash. Its leaves have a lethery texture while leaflets are oblong to lanceolate to elliptical in shape, they can reach 25 cm (9.8 in) long and 7 cm (2.8 in) wide and with a toothed margin. Flowers are yellow up to 14 in axillary racemes.

== Distribution ==
Occurs in Tropical East and Southern Africa and well distributed in the Usambara mountains in Tanzania. It is found in open woodlands, grasslands and rocky slopes.
