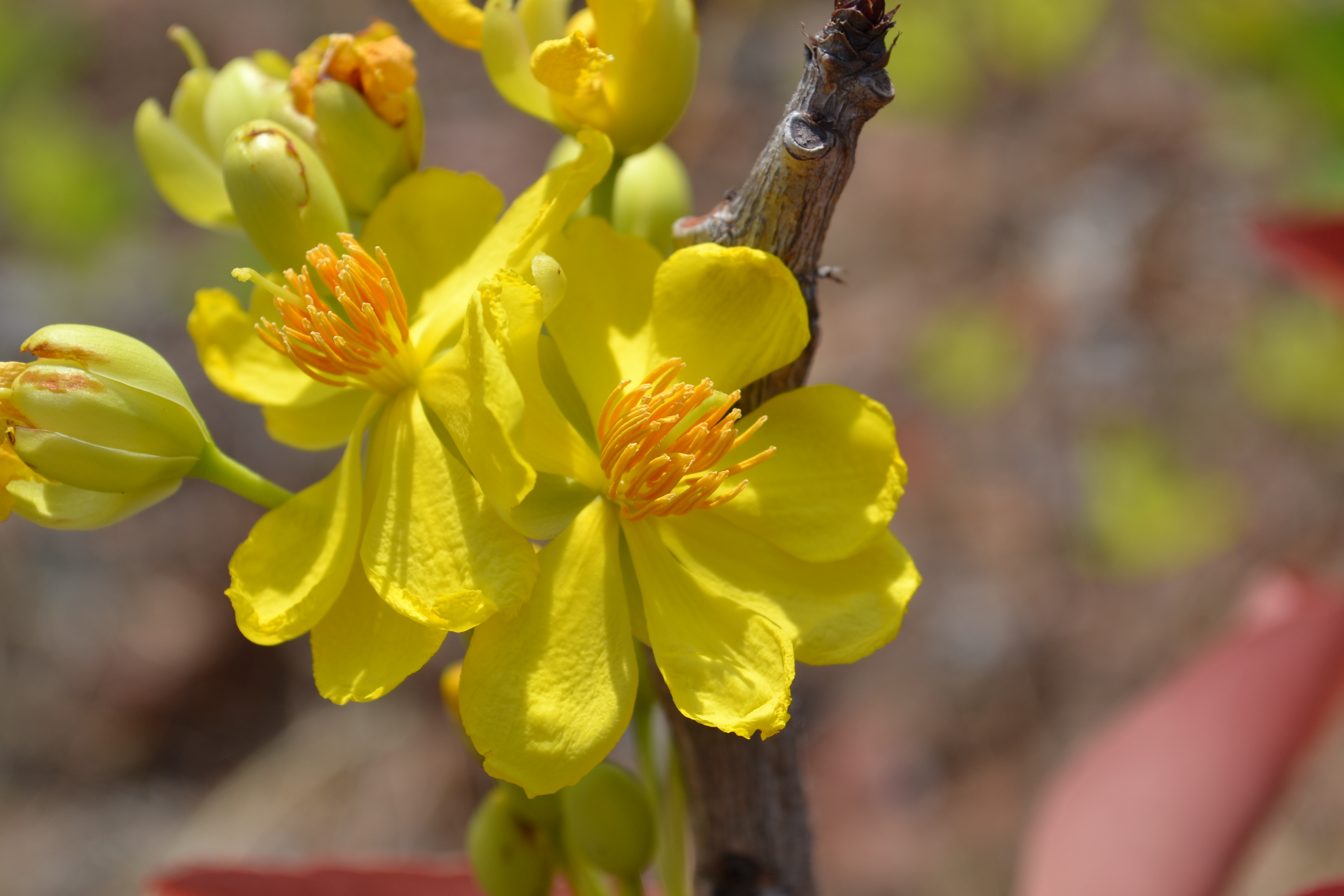

Scientific classification
- Kingdom: Plantae
- Clade: Tracheophytes
- Clade: Angiosperms
- Clade: Eudicots
- Clade: Rosids
- Order: Malpighiales
- Family: Ochnaceae
- Genus: Ochna
- Species: O. obtusata

Binomial name
- Ochna obtusata DC

= Ochna obtusata =

Species of shrub

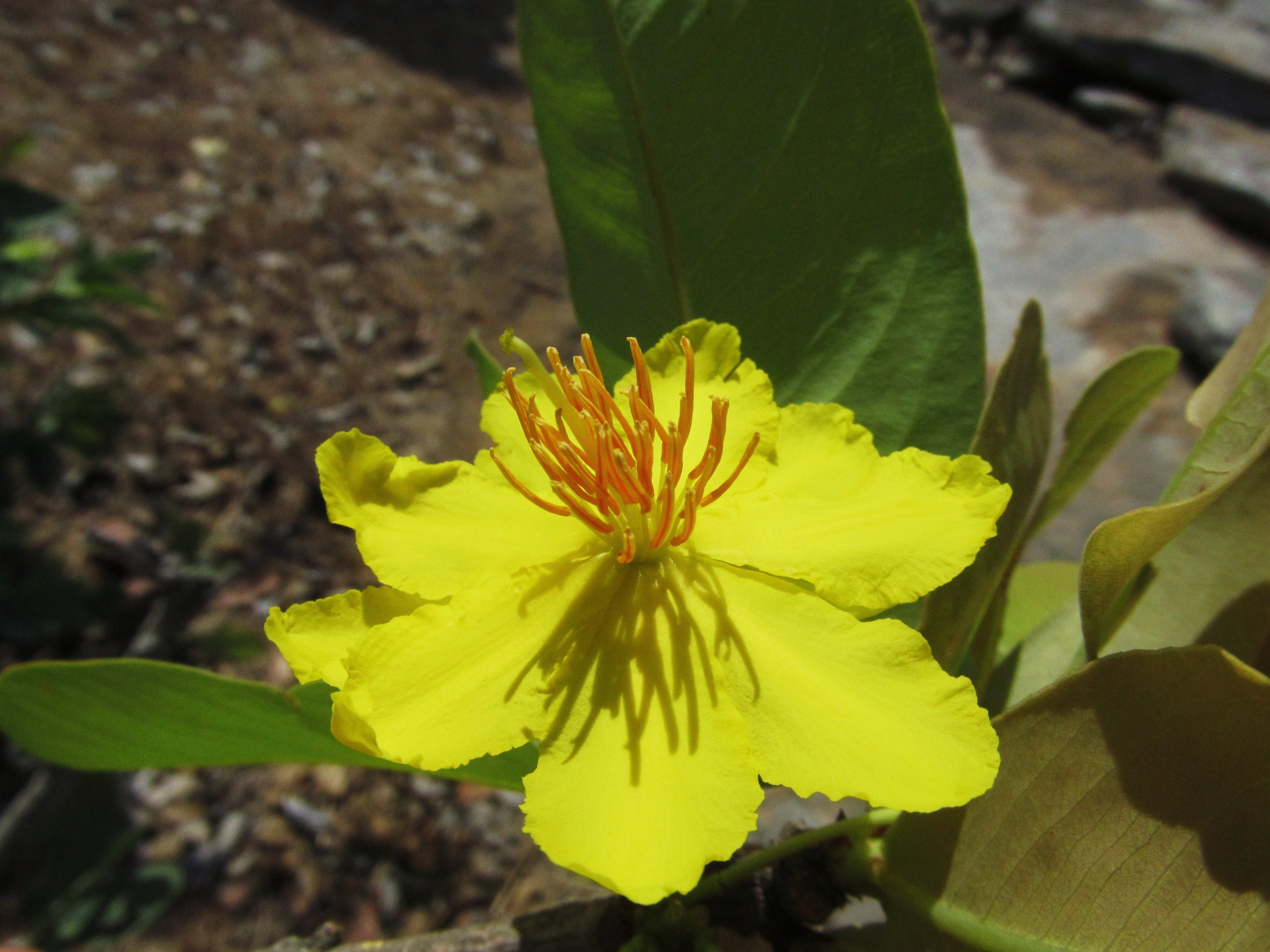
Ochna obtusata - Flower

Ochna obtusata is a woody shrub or a small tree with glossy leaves. It has attractive yellow flowers, followed by seeds surrounded by bright red sepals. The bright red seed cup is as attractive as the flowers. The seeds are initially green, but turn jet black later. The red seed cup looks like the face of the Disney cartoon character Mickey Mouse. Propagation is by seeds, which grow quickly, or by cuttings from hard wood, which are slower.″
