= Ochna puberula =

Scientific classification
- Kingdom: Plantae
- Clade: Tracheophytes
- Clade: Angiosperms
- Clade: Eudicots
- Clade: Rosids
- Order: Malpighiales
- Family: Ochnaceae
- Genus: Ochna
- Species: O. puberula

Binomial name
- Ochna puberula N.Robson

Species of plant

Ochna puberula is a shrub or small sized tree with bright yellow petals that are surrounded by green sepals that turn red during fruiting. It belongs to the family Ochnaceae.

== Description ==
A shrub or small sized tree capable of reaching 6 m tall with a greyish bark that is either smooth or fissured. When young, its stems have brownish lenticels on it. Leaves have stipules that are up to 8 mm long. Leaflets are obovate to oblanceolate in shape and their edges are often densely toothed, they are capable of reaching 8 cm in length and 3 cm in width, they have a rounded apex and a cuneate base. Inflorescence are in axillary racemes with yellow flowers borne on shortly pubescent pedicels.

== Distribution ==
Occurs in Eastern and Southern Africa, in south western Uganda southwards to Zimbabwe. Found in open woodland and wooded grasslands and in rocky areas.
