= Charaxes pondoensis =

Conservation status
- Least Concern (IUCN 3.1)

Scientific classification
- Kingdom: Animalia
- Phylum: Arthropoda
- Class: Insecta
- Order: Lepidoptera
- Family: Nymphalidae
- Genus: Charaxes
- Species: C. pondoensis

Binomial name
- Charaxes pondoensis van Someren, 1967

Synonyms
- Charaxes ethalion pondoensis van Someren, 1967

Species of butterfly

Charaxes pondoensis, the Pondo emperor, is a butterfly of the family Nymphalidae. It is found in South Africa.

The wingspan is 45–55 mm in males and 48–60 mm in females.

== Biology ==
The habitat is coastal scarp forest.

pondoensis flies year-round, with peaks October/November and March to May.

Larvae feed on Milletia sutherlandi and Milletia grandis.

Notes on the biology of pondoensis are given by Pringle et al (1994)

== Similar species ==
Charaxes ethalion and Charaxes karkloof

Charaxes. pondoensis differs from Charaxes ethalion and Charaxes karkloof in the stronger contrast between the light and dark areas on the underside, especially in males; the underside is silvery grey, not brown as in the other two species. On the underside of the hindwing in area 4 there are two fine, black lines at the end of the cell – these meet on vein 4 immediately basad of the juncture between vein 4 and vein 3. In the nominate subspecies of Charaxes karkloof these two lines are always separated and meet vein 4 on either side of this juncture.

== Taxonomy ==
Charaxes pondoensis is a member of the large species group Charaxes etheocles
