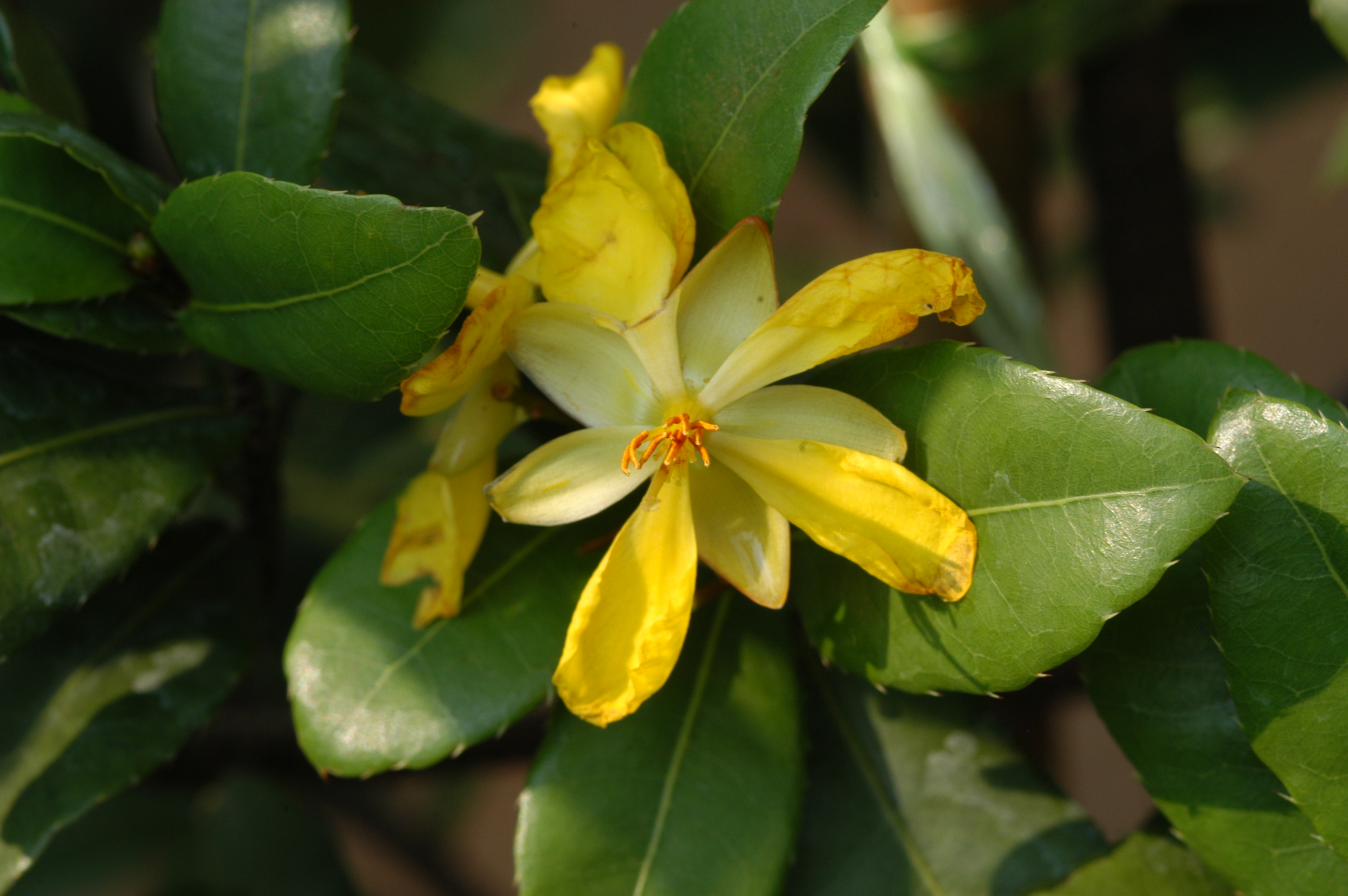

Scientific classification
- Kingdom: Plantae
- Clade: Embryophytes
- Clade: Tracheophytes
- Clade: Spermatophytes
- Clade: Angiosperms
- Clade: Eudicots
- Clade: Rosids
- Order: Malpighiales
- Family: Ochnaceae
- Genus: Ochna
- Species: O. kirkii

Binomial name
- Ochna kirkii Oliv.

Subspecies
- Ochna kirkii subsp. kirkii; Ochna kirkii subsp. multisetosa Verdc

= Ochna kirkii =

Shrub from East Africa

Ochna kirkii is a shrub or small sized tree with greyish bark, belonging to the family Ochnaceae. Native to East Africa, the plant has been introduced in other countries as an ornamental plant.

== Description ==
A shrub or small sized tree that is capable of reaching 6 m tall, it has a rough greyish bark and brown stems that become lenticellate as it grows older. Leaves are fairly thin or leatherly and leaflets are obovate to elliptic with margins that are mostly even and lacking teeth. Leaflets are capable of reaching 21 cm long and 7 cm wide with apex that is either acuminate or acute and a base that is cuneate to cordate. Flowers are in terminal panicles, bright yellow in color with red sepals and orange to reddish anthers, and the fruits are black cylindrical drupelets.

== Distribution and habitat ==
The species is native to Kenya, Tanzania and Mozambique, occurring in riparian forests and in thickets.
