= Ochna membranacea =

Scientific classification
- Kingdom: Plantae
- Clade: Embryophytes
- Clade: Tracheophytes
- Clade: Angiosperms
- Clade: Eudicots
- Clade: Rosids
- Order: Malpighiales
- Family: Ochnaceae
- Genus: Ochna
- Species: O. membranacea

Binomial name
- Ochna membranacea Oliv.

Species of flowering plant

Ochna membranacea is a shrub or small sized tree with yellow petals surrounded by red sepals belonging to the family Ochnaceae.

== Description ==
A shrub or tree, the species is capable of reaching a height of 12 m (39 ft); its stems tend to have longitudinal lines. The leaves have linear stipules and the leaflets are obovate to elliptic in shape; leaflets have a toothed margin and are capable of reaching 20 cm (7.9 in) long and 7 cm (2.8 in) wide, they are acuminate at the apex and cuneate to rounded at base. The yellow flowers are arranged in panicles that are 5–12 cm (2.0–4.7 in) long and the fuit is a kidney shaped drupe.

== Distribution and habitat ==
Found in Tropical Africa from Guinea in West Africa eastwards to the Congo Basin and Sudan. It is commonly found in gallery and evergreen forests and observed in thickets.
