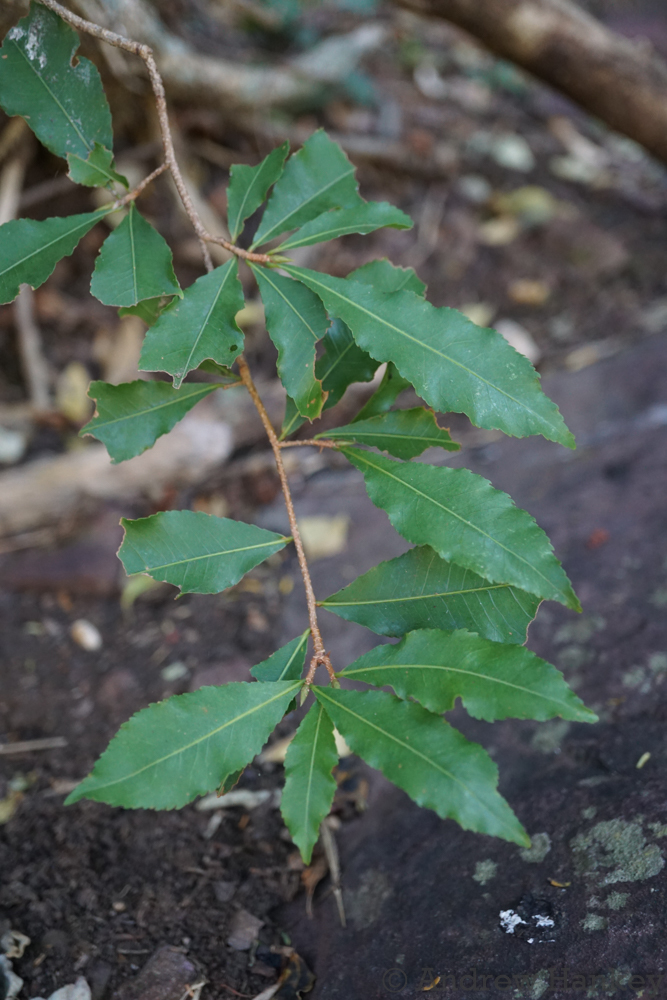

Scientific classification
- Kingdom: Plantae
- Clade: Embryophytes
- Clade: Tracheophytes
- Clade: Angiosperms
- Clade: Eudicots
- Clade: Rosids
- Order: Malpighiales
- Family: Ochnaceae
- Genus: Ochna
- Species: O. holstii

Binomial name
- Ochna holstii Engl.

= Ochna holstii =

Species of flowering plant

Ochna holstii is an evergreen medium to large sized tree belonging to the family Ochnaceae.

== Description ==
Ochna holstii mostly grows as a tree but occasionally grows as a shrub. As a tree, it can reach a height of 27 m (89 ft) but when shrubby it tends to be between 1.5 to 3 m (4.9 to 9.8 ft) tall. The bark is greyish to brown in color while the slash is pinkish turning reddish when exposed, stems are dark grey and lenticellate. Leaves have a papery texture and they tend to have stipules that can reach 15 mm (0.59 in) in length, petioles reach 3 mm (0.12 in) in length. Leaflets are oblanceolate to elliptic in outline with a toothed margin, they can reach up to 12 cm (4.7 in) long and 5 cm (2.0 in) wide, the apex of leaflets tend to be acute to acuminate while the base is cuneate. The inflorescence is arranged in raceme form with 5-20 pale yellow flowers and long pedicels that can reach to 4 cm long.

== Distribution ==
Occurs in East and Southern Africa from Ethiopia southwards to South Africa. Commonly found in afromontane forests, rain forest and upland grasslands.

== Uses ==
Wood of Ochna holstii is used in making tool handles, in joinery and in furniture, it is also used in interior work and construction.
