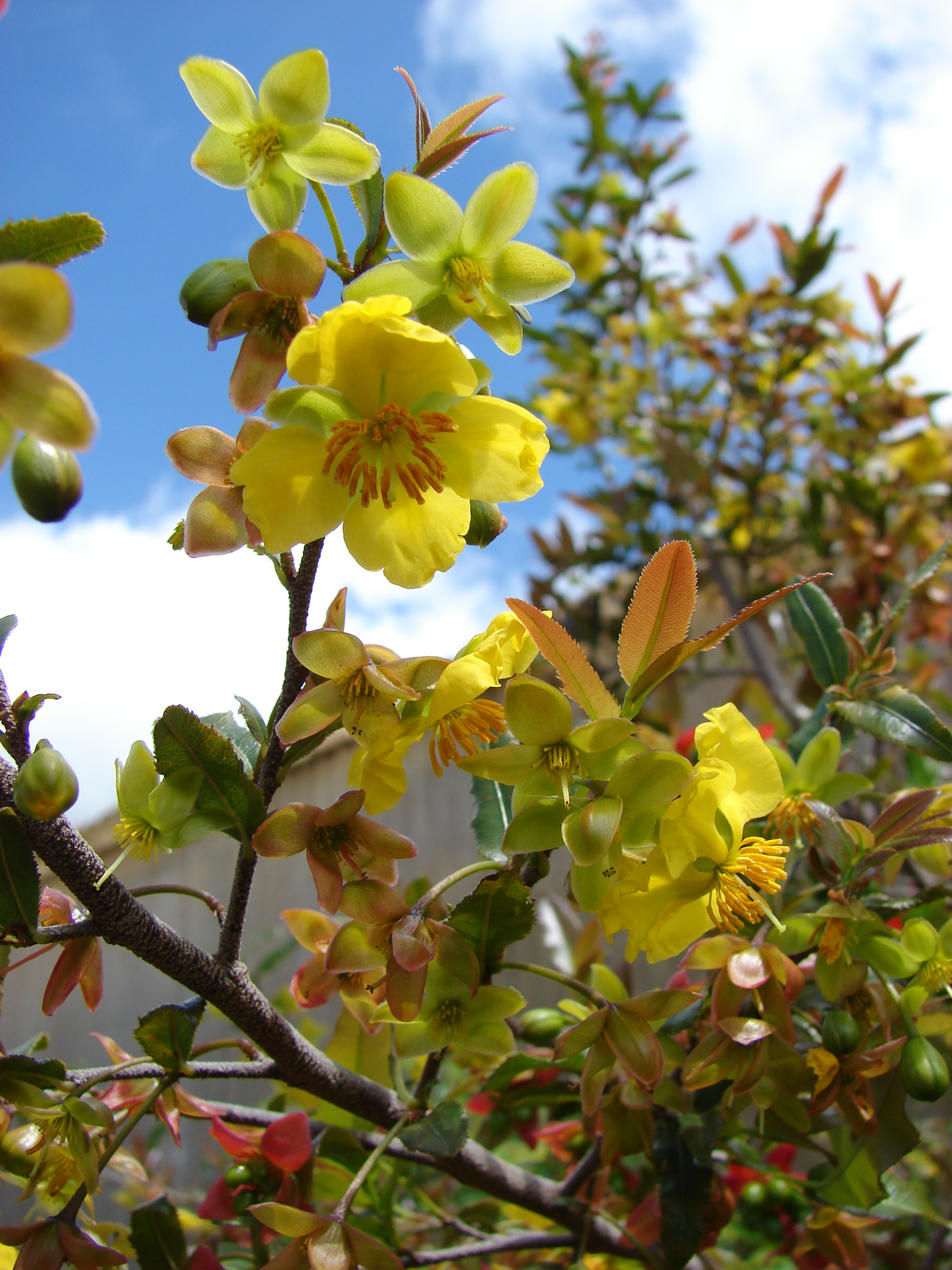
- Ochna serrulata

Scientific classification
- Kingdom: Plantae
- Clade: Tracheophytes
- Clade: Angiosperms
- Clade: Eudicots
- Clade: Rosids
- Order: Malpighiales
- Family: Ochnaceae
- Subfamily: Ochnoideae
- Tribe: Ochneae
- Subtribe: Ochninae
- Genus: Ochna; L., 1753

Species
- 79; see text

Synonyms
- Biramella Tiegh. (1903); Campylochnella Tiegh. (1902); Diporidium H.L.Wendl. (1825); Diporochna Tiegh. (1902); Discladium Tiegh. (1902); Heteroporidium Tiegh. (1902); Jabotapita Adans. (1763), nom. superfl.; Monoporidium Tiegh. (1902); Ochnella Tiegh. (1902); Pentochna Tiegh. (1907); Philomeda Noronha ex Thouars (1806); Pleodiporochna Tiegh. (1903); Pleopetalum Tiegh. (1903); Polyochnella Tiegh. (1902); Polythecium Tiegh. (1902), nom. illeg.; Porochna Tiegh. (1902); Proboscella Tiegh. (1903)

= Ochna =

Genus of flowering plants

Ochna is a genus comprising 79 species of evergreen trees, shrubs and shrublets belonging to the flowering plant family Ochnaceae. These species are native to tropical woodlands of Africa, Madagascar, the Mascarenes and Asia. Species of this genus are usually called ochnas, bird's-eye bushes or Mickey-mouse plants, a name derived from the shape of the drupelet fruit. The name of this genus comes from the Greek word ὄχνη (ókhnē), used by Theocritus and meaning "wild pear", as the leaves are similar in appearance. Some species, including Ochna integerrima (yellow Mai flower) and O. serrulata (bird's eye plant), are cultivated as decorative plants.

== Distribution ==
Species of this genus are found in the Old World Tropics, in sub-Saharan Africa, Madagascar, the Mascarene Islands, Arabian Peninsula, Indian subcontinent, Indo-China, and southeastern China.

== Species ==
79 species are accepted.

- Ochna afzelii R.Br. ex Oliv.
- Ochna afzelioides N.Robson
- Ochna andravinensis Baill.
- Ochna angustata N.Robson
- Ochna apetala Verdc.
- Ochna arborea Burch. ex DC.
- Ochna atropurpurea DC.
- Ochna bakeriana Kuntze
- Ochna barbertonensis T.Shah
- Ochna barbosae N.Robson – sand plane, sand ochna
- Ochna baronii (Tiegh.) Callm. & Phillipson
- Ochna beirensis N.Robson
- Ochna boiviniana Baill.
- Ochna bracteosa Robyns & Lawalrée
- Ochna braunii Sleumer
- Ochna calodendron Gilg & Mildbr.
- Ochna ciliata Lam.
- Ochna cinnabarina Engl. & Gilg
- Ochna citrina Gilg
- Ochna comorensis Baill.
- Ochna confusa Burtt Davy & Greenway
- Ochna cyanophylla N.Robson
- Ochna dolicharthros F.M.Crawford & I.Darbysh.
- Ochna gamblei King ex Brandis
- Ochna gambleoides N.Robson
- Ochna gamostigmata Du Toit
- Ochna glauca I.Verd. - blue–leaved ochna
- Ochna hackarsii Robyns & Lawalrée
- Ochna hiernii (Tiegh.) Exell
- Ochna holstii Engl. – red ironwood, red ironwood ochna
- Ochna holtzii Gilg
- Ochna humblotiana Baill.
- Ochna inermis (Forssk.) Schweinf. – stunted plane, boat-fruited ochna
- Ochna insculpta Sleumer
- Ochna integerrima (Lour.) Merr. – yellow Mai flower (for Tet in southern Vietnam)
- Ochna jabotapita L.
- Ochna katangensis De Wild.
- Ochna kirkii Oliv.
- Ochna lanceolata Spreng.
- Ochna latisepala (Tiegh.) Bamps
- Ochna leptoclada Oliv.
- Ochna leucophloeos Hochst. ex A.Rich.
- Ochna louvelii (H.Perrier) Callm. & Phillipson – besarandrana, menahy
- Ochna macrantha Baker
- Ochna macrocalyx Oliv.
- Ochna madagascariensis DC.
- Ochna maguirei K.Balkwill
- Ochna manikensis De Wild.
- Ochna mauritiana Lam.
- Ochna membranacea Oliv.
- Ochna micrantha Schweinf. & Gilg
- Ochna multiflora DC.
- Ochna natalitia (Meisn.) Walp. – Natal plane, showy ochna
- Ochna obtusata DC.
- Ochna ovata F.Hoffm.
- Ochna oxyphylla N.Robson
- Ochna pervilleana Baill.
- Ochna polyarthra Verdc.
- Ochna polycarpa Baker
- Ochna polyneura Gilg
- Ochna pretoriensis E.Phillips – Magalies plane, Magalies ochna
- Ochna pseudoprocera Sleumer
- Ochna puberula N.Robson
- Ochna pulchra Hook. – peeling plane, peeling ochna
- Ochna pumila Buch.-Ham. ex DC.
- Ochna pygmaea Hiern
- Ochna rhizomatosa (Tiegh.) Keay
- Ochna richardsiae N.Robson
- Ochna rovumensis Gilg
- Ochna sambiranensis Callm. & Phillipson
- Ochna schliebenii Sleumer
- Ochna schweinfurthiana F.Hoffm.
- Ochna serrulata (Hochst.) Walp. (syns. O. atropurpurea, O. multiflora) – carnival ochna, Mickey mouse bush
- Ochna staudtii Gilg
- Ochna stolzii Gilg
- Ochna thomasiana Engl. & Gilg
- Ochna thouvenotii (H.Perrier) Callm. & Phillipson
- Ochna vaccinoides Baker
