= Ochna rhizomatosa =

Scientific classification
- Kingdom: Plantae
- Clade: Embryophytes
- Clade: Tracheophytes
- Clade: Angiosperms
- Clade: Eudicots
- Clade: Rosids
- Order: Malpighiales
- Family: Ochnaceae
- Genus: Ochna
- Species: O. rhizomatosa

Binomial name
- Ochna rhizomatosa (Tiegh.) Keay

Species of flowering plant

Ochna rhizomatosa is a subshrub or shrub belonging to the family Ochnaceae, it is commonly found in West African savannah woodlands, from Guinea eastwards to Cameroon.

== Description ==
A scandent or dwarf shrub that can reach up to 4 m (13 ft) tall, it has a characteristic rounded crown. The bark is dark grey in color and the slash is yellow turning reddish-brown when exposed; the stems are grey in color and they bear fewer leaves during flowering. Leaves have stipules and petioles, stipules are in pairs and they drop off early, they can be up to 1 cm (0.39 in) long, while petioles can reach 4 mm long. The leaflets of Ochna rhizomatosa can reach 12 cm (4.7 in) long and 5 cm (2.0 in) wide bearing a margin that is commonly toothed. The inflorescence is racemoid in arrangement and the pedicel bearing the yellow flowers is up to 2.5 cm (1 in) long.
