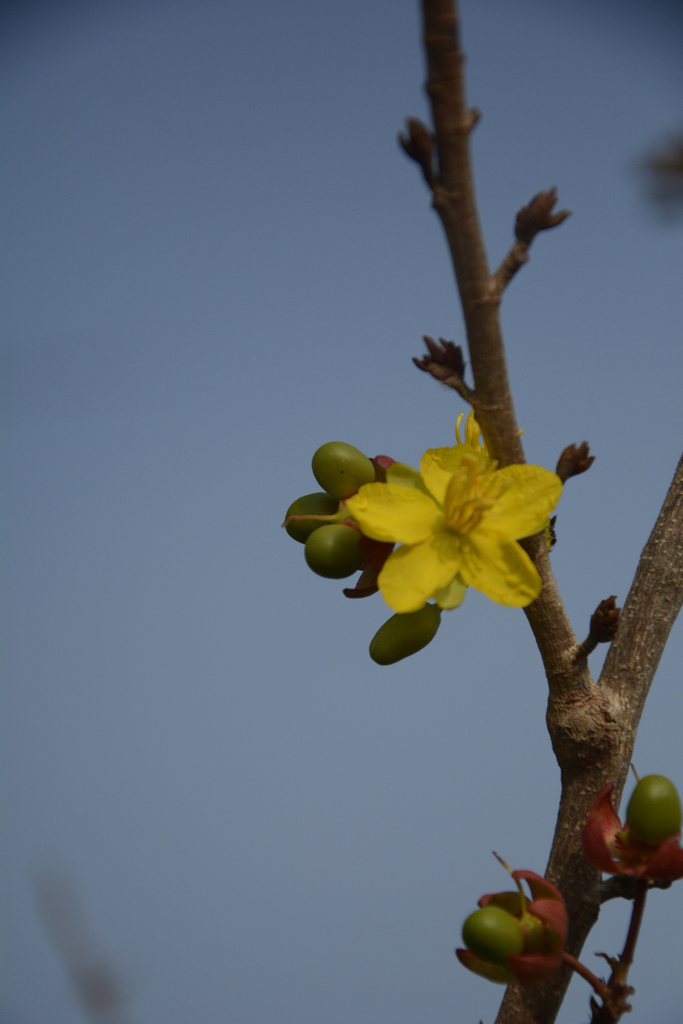

Scientific classification
- Kingdom: Plantae
- Clade: Tracheophytes
- Clade: Angiosperms
- Clade: Eudicots
- Clade: Rosids
- Order: Malpighiales
- Family: Ochnaceae
- Genus: Ochna
- Species: O. lanceolata

Binomial name
- Ochna lanceolata Spreng.

= Ochna lanceolata =

Species of flowering plant

Ochna lanceolata is a species of plant in the family Ochnaceae. It is native to India and Sri Lanka.

It is an 8m tall plant with greyish bark and reddish blaze. Leaves are simple, alternate; lamina narrow elliptic, elliptic-lanceolate; apex acute; base acute with serrate margin. Flowers show raceme inflorescence. Fruit is a single-seeded drupe. The tree is known as bo kera/mal kera in Sinhala language.
