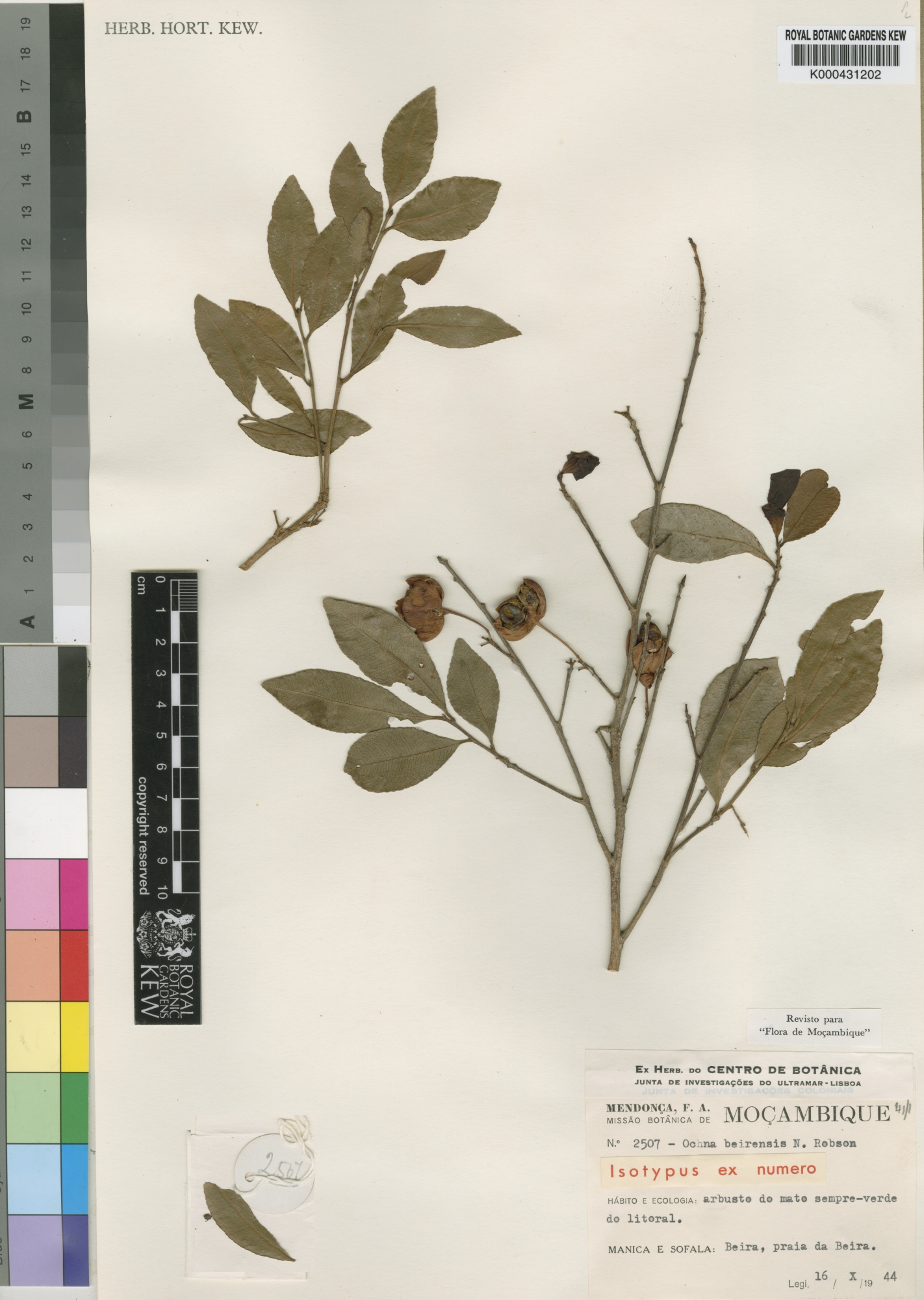

Conservation status
- Endangered (IUCN 3.1)

Scientific classification
- Kingdom: Plantae
- Clade: Tracheophytes
- Clade: Angiosperms
- Clade: Eudicots
- Clade: Rosids
- Order: Malpighiales
- Family: Ochnaceae
- Genus: Ochna
- Species: O. beirensis

Binomial name
- Ochna beirensis N.K.B.Robson

= Ochna beirensis =

Species of flowering plant

Ochna beirensis is a species of plant in the family Ochnaceae. It is endemic to Mozambique.
