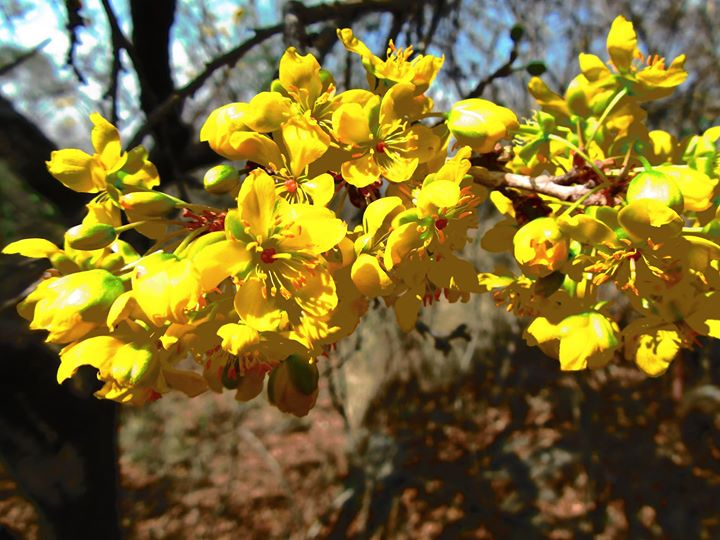

Scientific classification
- Kingdom: Plantae
- Clade: Embryophytes
- Clade: Tracheophytes
- Clade: Angiosperms
- Clade: Eudicots
- Clade: Rosids
- Order: Malpighiales
- Family: Ochnaceae
- Genus: Ochna
- Species: O. schweinfurthiana

Binomial name
- Ochna schweinfurthiana F.Hoffm.

= Ochna schweinfurthiana =

Species of flowering plant

Ochna schweinfurthiana is a shrub or small tree belonging to the family Ochnaceae. It is represented in open deciduous woodlands in Tropical Africa.

== Description ==
A scandent shrub or an evergreen tree, Ochna schweinfurthiana can grow up to 4 m (13 ft) tall and occasionally up to 8 m (26 ft). It has a greyish bark that is often fissured with a slash that is yellow turning red-brown. Leaves have stipules that can reach 3 mm in length and petioles that is capable of reaching 12 mm long. Leaflets are obovate to lanceolate in shape, they can reach 13 cm (5.1 in) in length and 6 cm (2.4 in) in width, they often have margins that are toothed and have a leathery surface; the apex tends to be rounded while the base is cuneate to tapering. Inflorescence has a raceme arrangement and pedunculate with flowers borne on leaf axil, it bears bright yellow flowers that are caducous, meaning short lived.

== Distribution and habitat ==
It occurs in Tropical Africa from Guinea and Mali, eastwards to Sudan and Southwards to Zimbabwe. It is found in woodlands.

== Uses ==
The species is cultivated as an ornamental plant partly due to its bright yellow flowers.

In Northern Cameroon, native healers pound the stem bark of the species to treat malaria fever while root, leaves and stem bark extracts are used in decoctions to aid the wound healing process.
