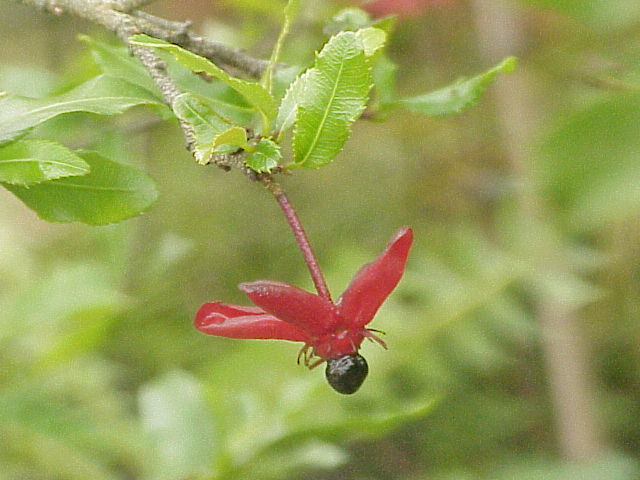
- The plant's typical bright red sepal with a black berry

Conservation status
- Least Concern (IUCN 3.1)

Scientific classification
- Kingdom: Plantae
- Clade: Embryophytes
- Clade: Tracheophytes
- Clade: Angiosperms
- Clade: Eudicots
- Clade: Rosids
- Order: Malpighiales
- Family: Ochnaceae
- Genus: Ochna
- Species: O. serrulata

Binomial name
- Ochna serrulata (Hochst.) Walp.

Synonyms
- Diporidium serrulatum Hochst.

= Ochna serrulata =

Species of flowering plant

Ochna serrulata (commonly known as the small-leaved plane, carnival ochna, bird's eye bush, Mickey mouse plant or Mickey Mouse bush due to the plant's ripe blackfruit, which upside down resembles the ears of Mickey Mouse, and bright-red sepals, which resembles his trousers) is an ornamental garden plant in the family Ochnaceae which is indigenous to South Africa. It is planted in southern African gardens and is an invasive species in Australia and New Zealand.

== Taxonomy ==
Ochna serrulata was first described by the German naturalist Christian Ferdinand Friedrich Hochstetter, and given its current binomial name by Wilhelm Gerhard Walpers. Its specific epithet is derived from the Latin serrula "little saw", and refers to its fine-toothed leaf margins.

== Description ==
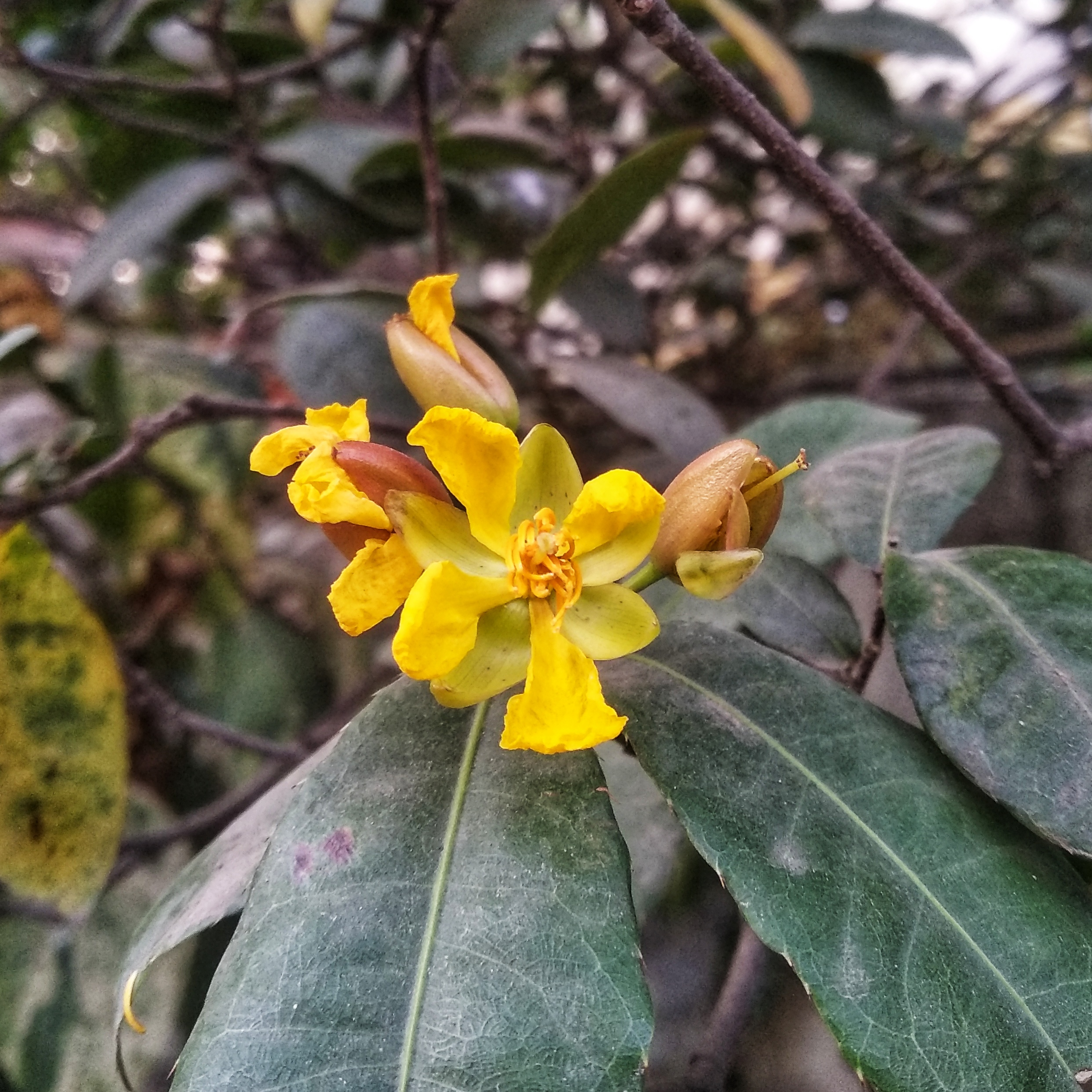
Flower of Ochna serrulata

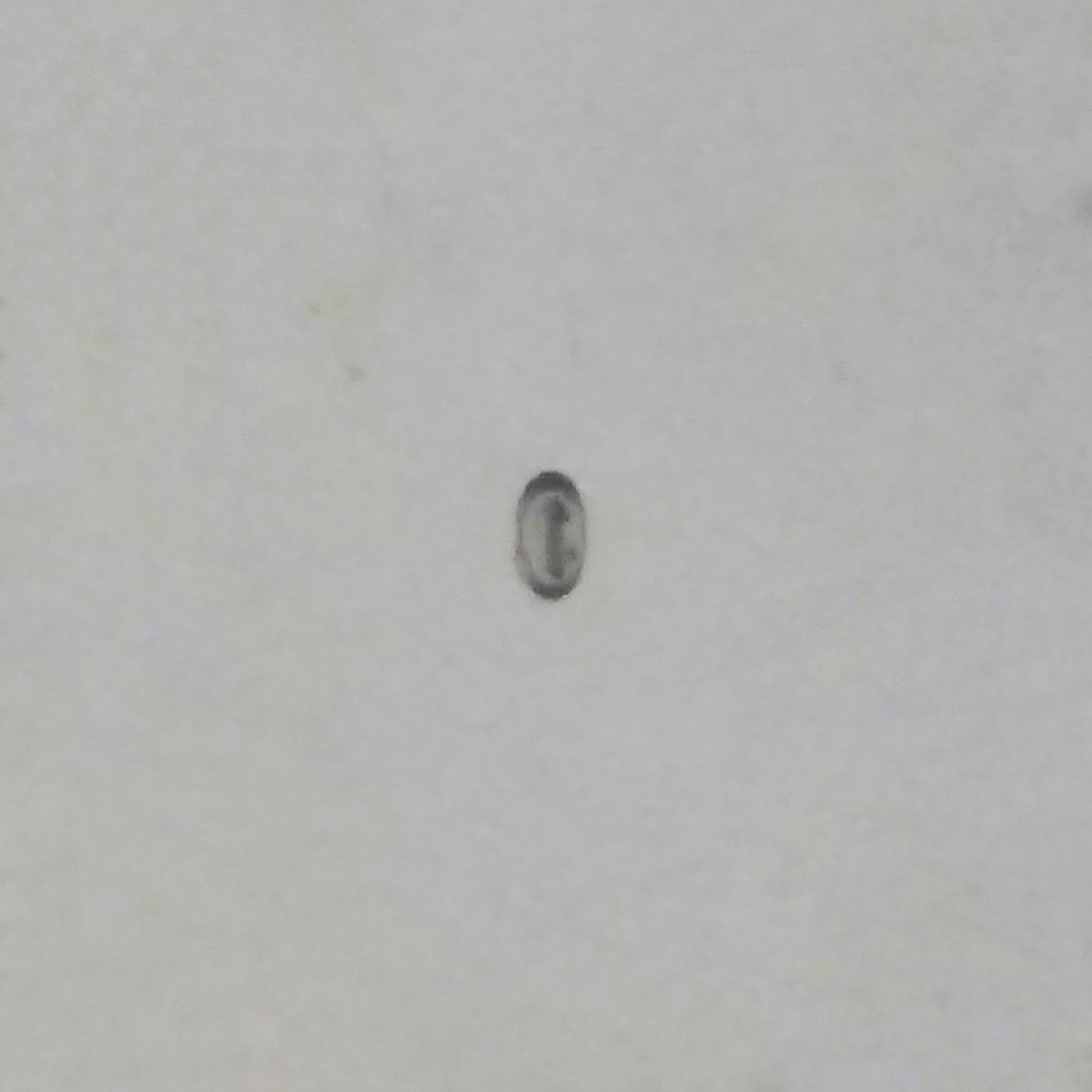
Pollen of Ochna serrulata

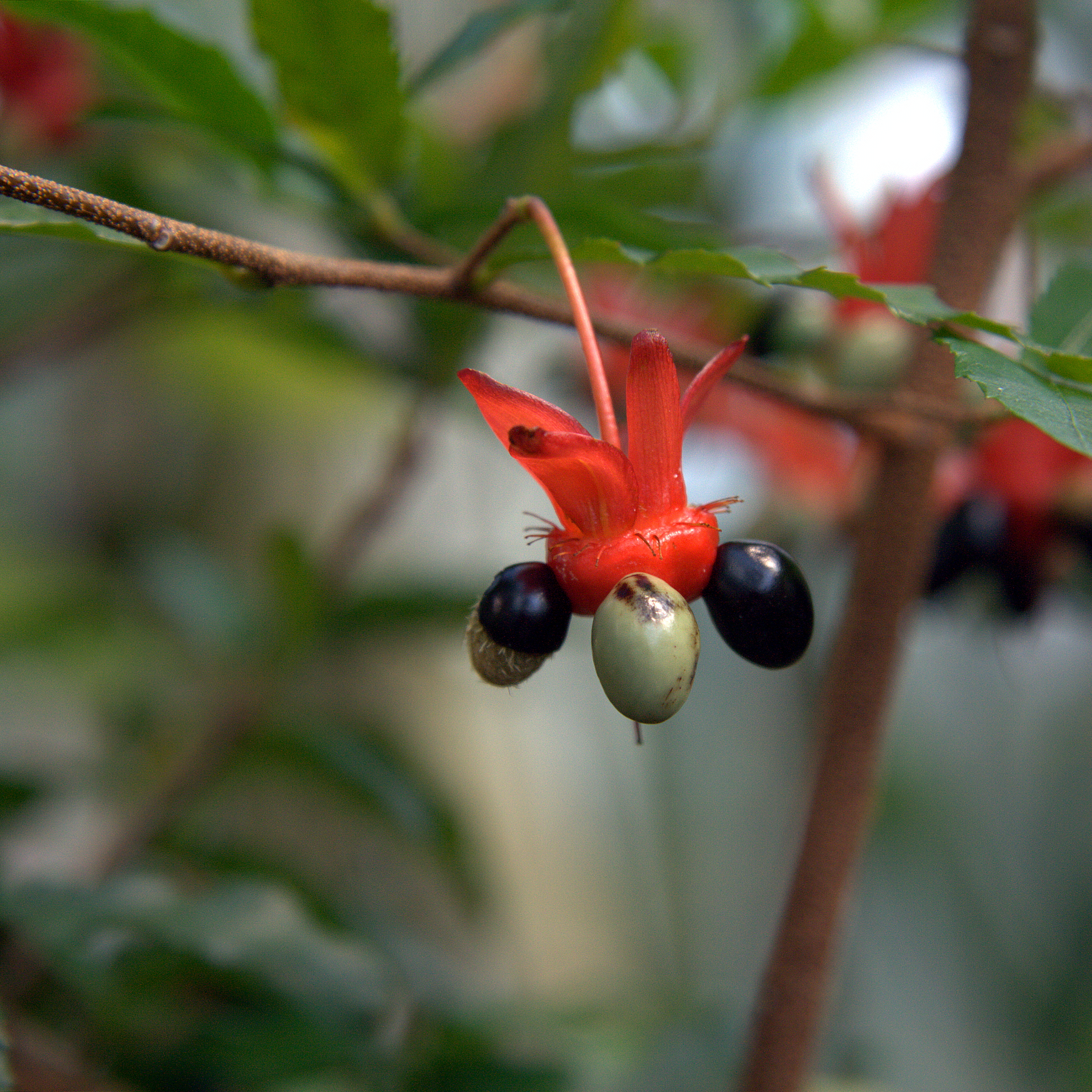
Ochna serrulata with fruits and the bright-red sepals that resemble the ears and trousers of Mickey Mouse

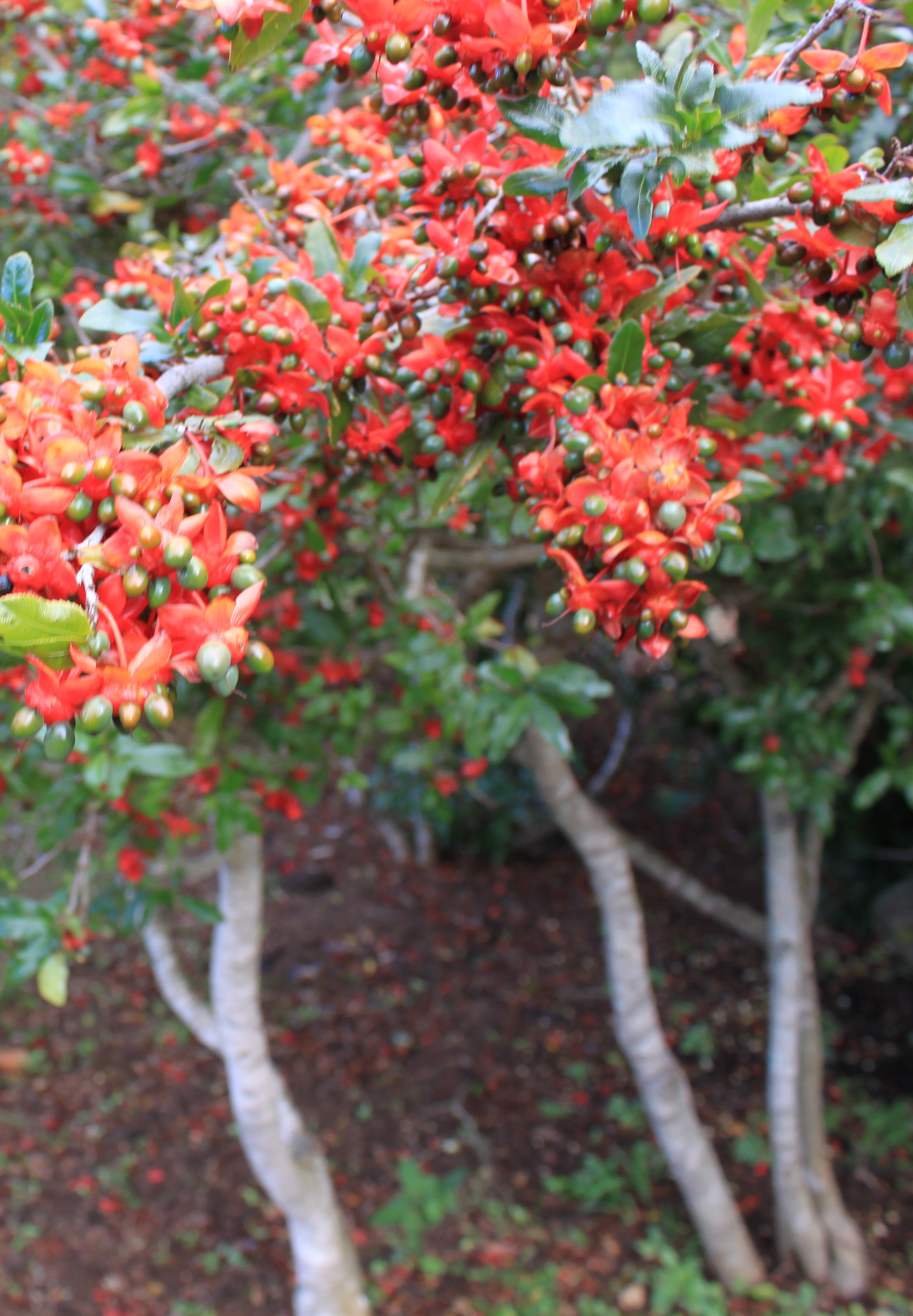
An Ochna serrulata shrub

Ochna serrulata is a small shrub growing between 1 and 2 m (3.3 and 6.6 ft) high, although it may occasionally become a small tree up to 6 m (20 ft) high. The narrow leaves are oblong to elliptic and measure 30–60 mm (1.2–2.4 in) in length by 8–15 mm (3/8–5/8 in) wide, and are shiny green with fine toothed serrations along the leaf edges. During the spring, the shrub's fragrant yellow flowers appear; they are usually around 2 cm (0.79 in) in diameter. However, the yellow petals tend to drop soon after the flower has opened. Pollen grains are elongated, approximately 35×18 microns in size. Five or six fruitlets grow from each flower; they are inserted on the receptacle. While the fruitlets are developing, the sepals and the receptacle become enlarged and turn bright red, usually giving the whole bush a red appearance. The 5 mm (1/4 in)-diameter fruitlets are initially pale green and turn black on maturity. In places including Kirstenbosch, the fruilets on the plant start ripening in the early summer, while the red sepals last until around late summer. The flowers usually attract bees and butterflies, while the birds tend to eat the fruitlets from the plant. The seeds can be released by birds and water.

== Distribution and habitat ==
The plant is native to the forest areas of South Africa. It occurs throughout the country, from Cape Town in the south, along the east coast as far as Kwazulu-Natal, and inland through Eswatini and Gauteng. This tough, adaptable shrub grows in sunny, open positions as well as in the shade of deep forest.

It has been widely cultivated outside of South Africa as an ornamental garden plant, and has become a weed in New South Wales and southern Queensland in eastern Australia, where it is found near human habitation in and around large towns and cities.

== Cultivation ==
This plant makes a very attractive indigenous shrub for South African gardens. It is hardy and resilient and can be planted both in the sun as well as in shady areas. It is initially slow-growing, but speeds up once it is established, especially if it is watered frequently. This is a very good plant for attracting birds to the garden. It does not tolerate frost well, but adapts well to light pruning and is attractive throughout the year, even when not in fruit.

Ochna serrulata is also one of several cultivated plants in Hawaii for their colorful flowers and unusual fruits.

== Invasive species ==
Ochna serrulata is a weed in parts of eastern Australia with a potential to spread from its current range. In New Zealand it is listed on the National Pest Plant Accord prohibiting its sale, commercial propagation and distribution.
