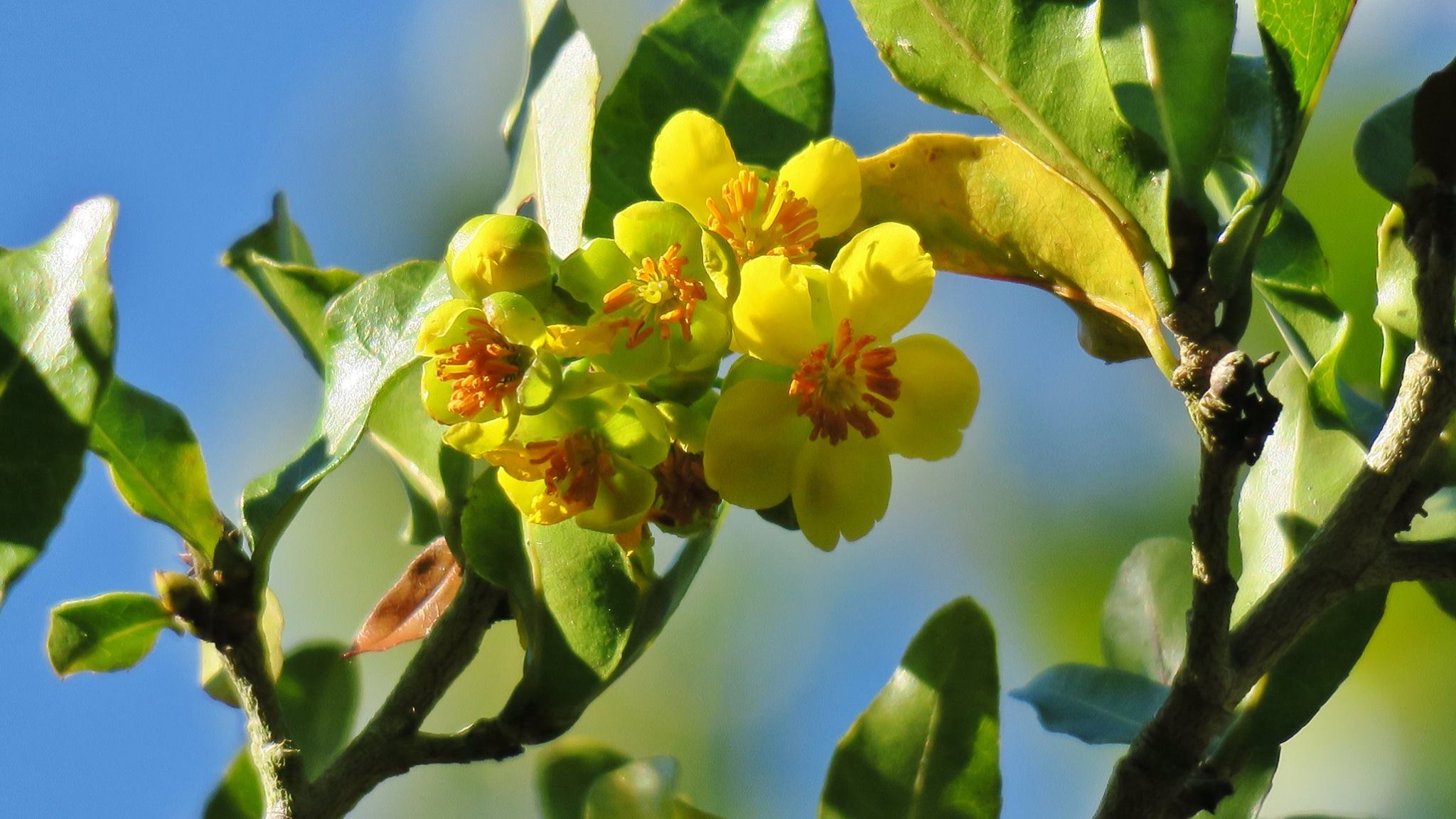

Conservation status
- Least Concern (IUCN 3.1)

Scientific classification
- Kingdom: Plantae
- Clade: Tracheophytes
- Clade: Angiosperms
- Clade: Eudicots
- Clade: Rosids
- Order: Malpighiales
- Family: Ochnaceae
- Genus: Ochna
- Species: O. arborea

Binomial name
- Ochna arborea Burch. ex DC.

= Ochna arborea =

Species of flowering plant

Ochna arborea, the Cape redwood, is a species of tree in the Ochnaceae family.

== Range and habitat ==
The Cape redwood is found in eastern Southern Africa; in Eswatini, Mozambique and South Africa.

== Taxonomy ==
There are two varieties of the Cape redwood:

- African-boxwood (Ochna arborea var. arborea)
- Coldbark plane (Ochna arborea var. oconnorii)

== Names ==
Ochna arborea is also called coldbark ochna and Cape plane in English, the Kaapse rooihout in Afrikaans, umthentsema in Xhosa, and umthelelo in Zulu.

== Gallery ==
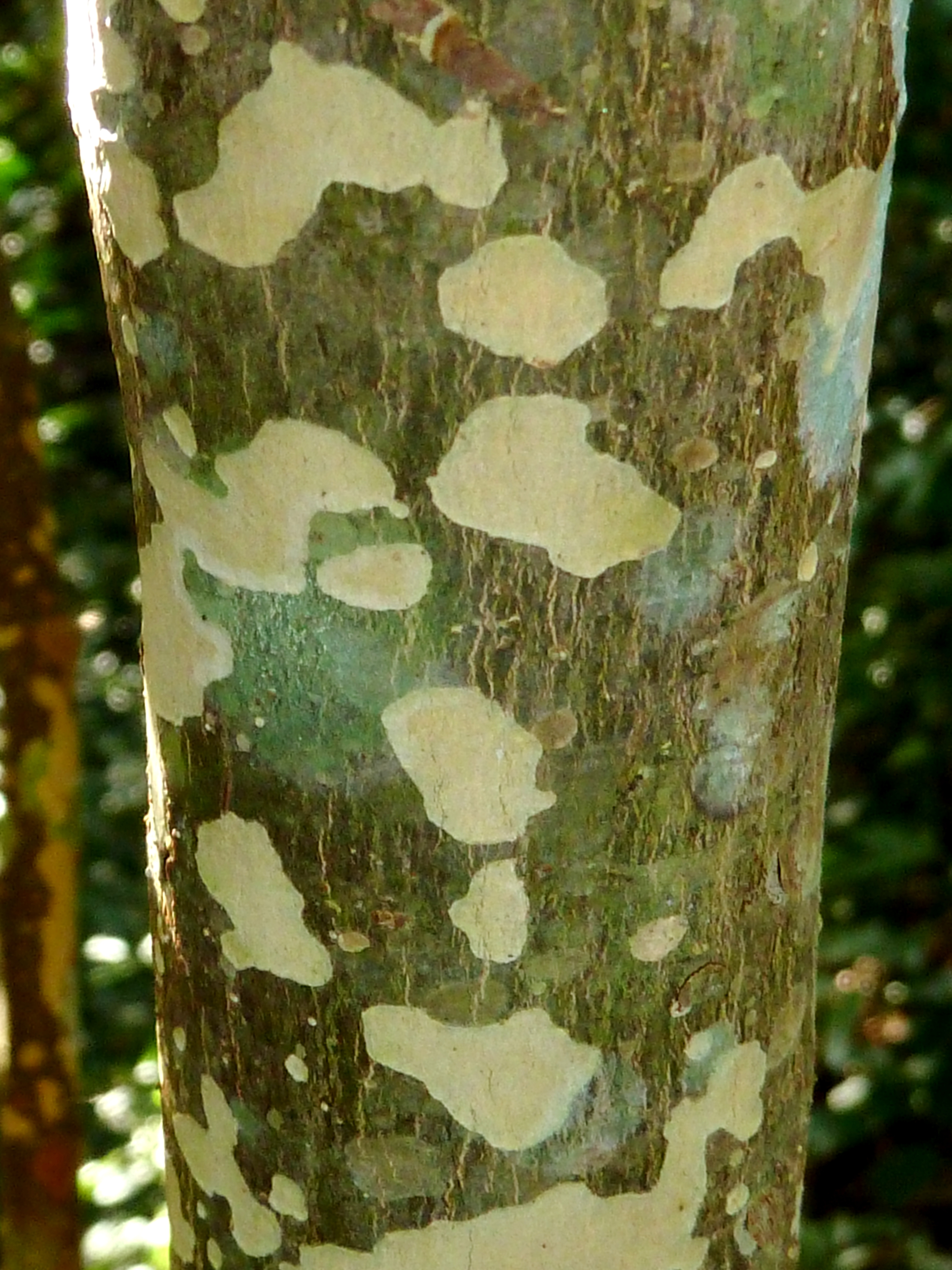
Bark

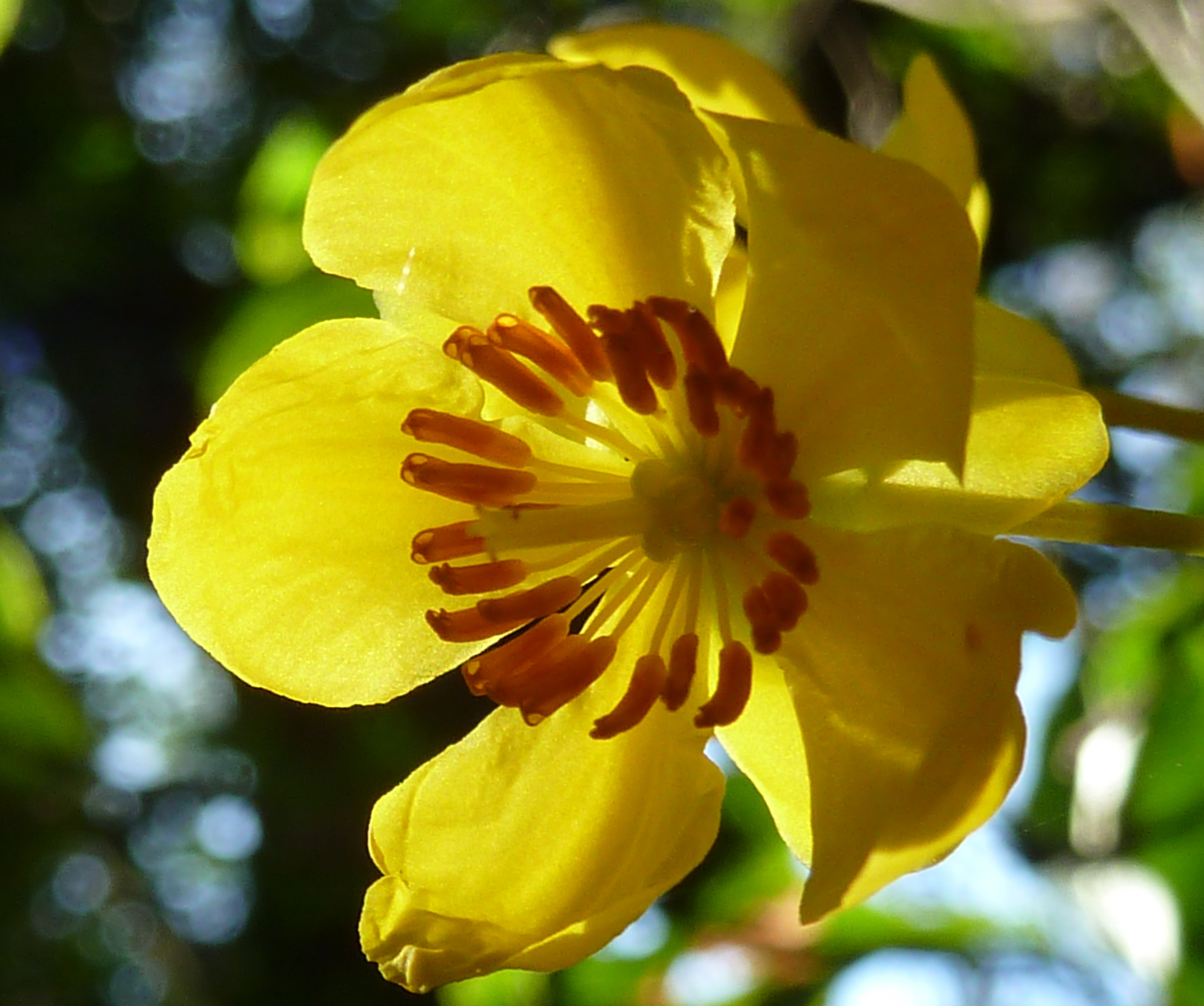
Flower

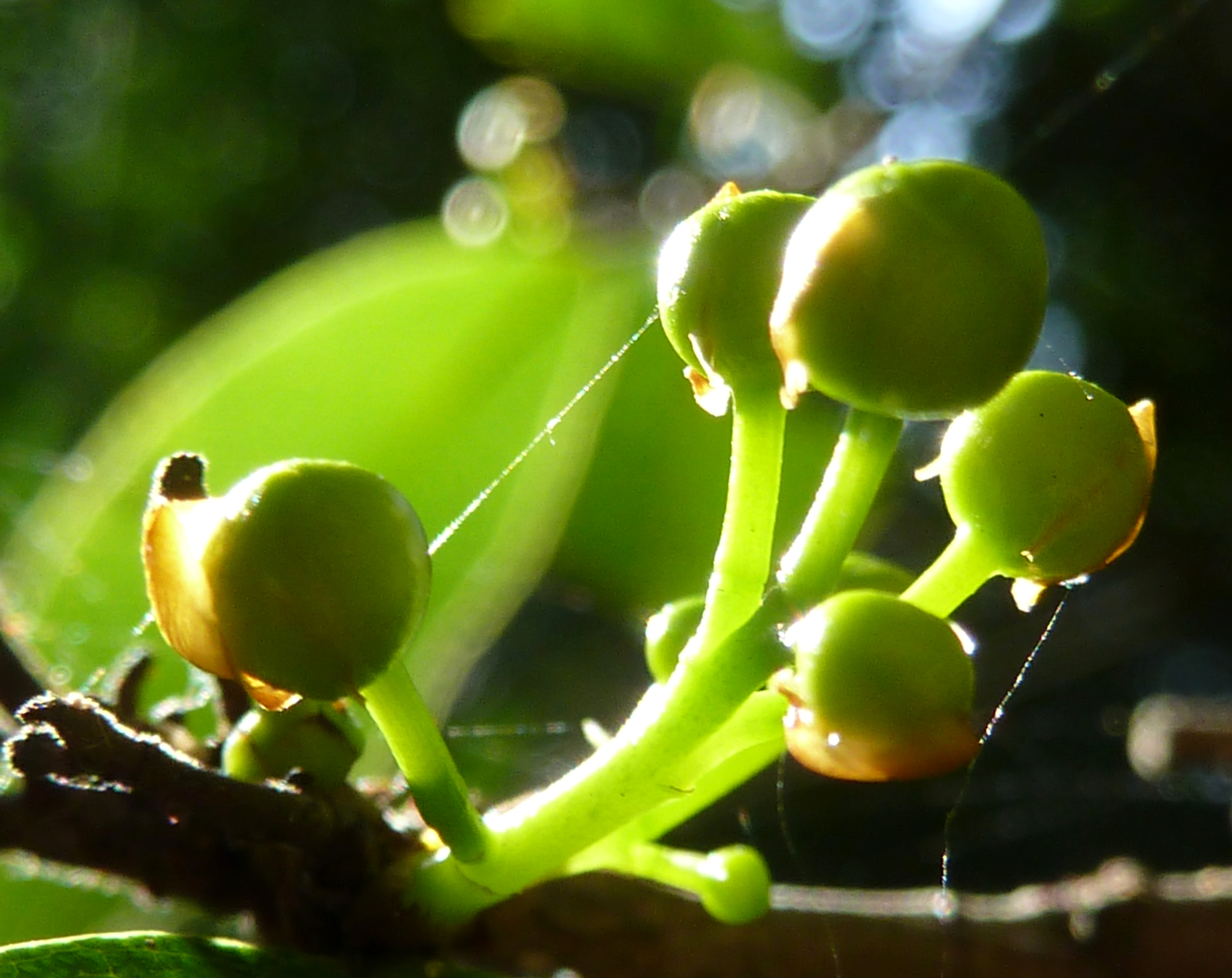
Flower buds
