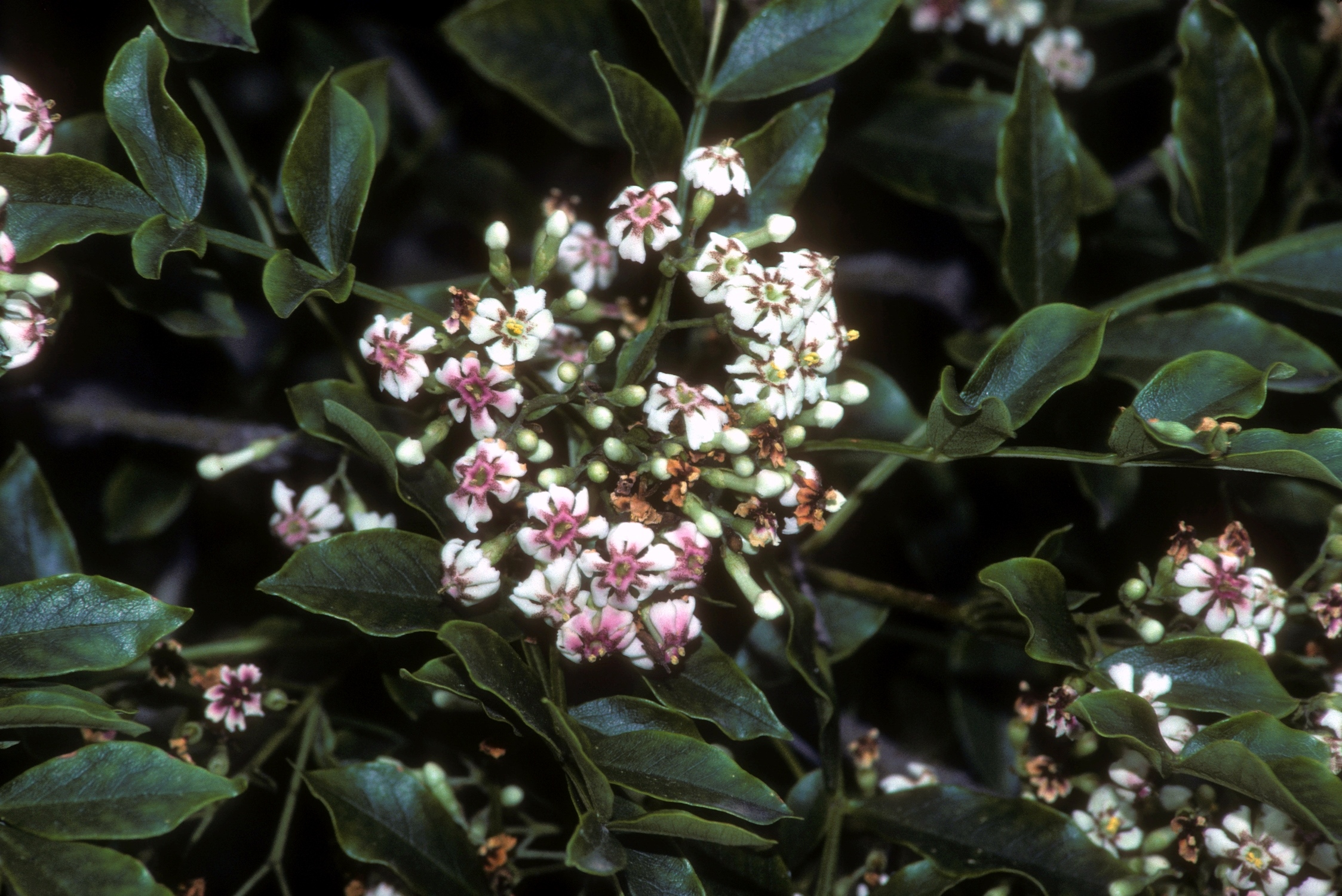
- Schrebera alata

Scientific classification
- Kingdom: Plantae
- Clade: Tracheophytes
- Clade: Angiosperms
- Clade: Eudicots
- Clade: Asterids
- Order: Lamiales
- Family: Oleaceae
- Tribe: Oleeae
- Subtribe: Schreberinae
- Genus: Schrebera; Roxb.

Synonyms
- Nathusia Hochst.

= Schrebera =

Genus of plants

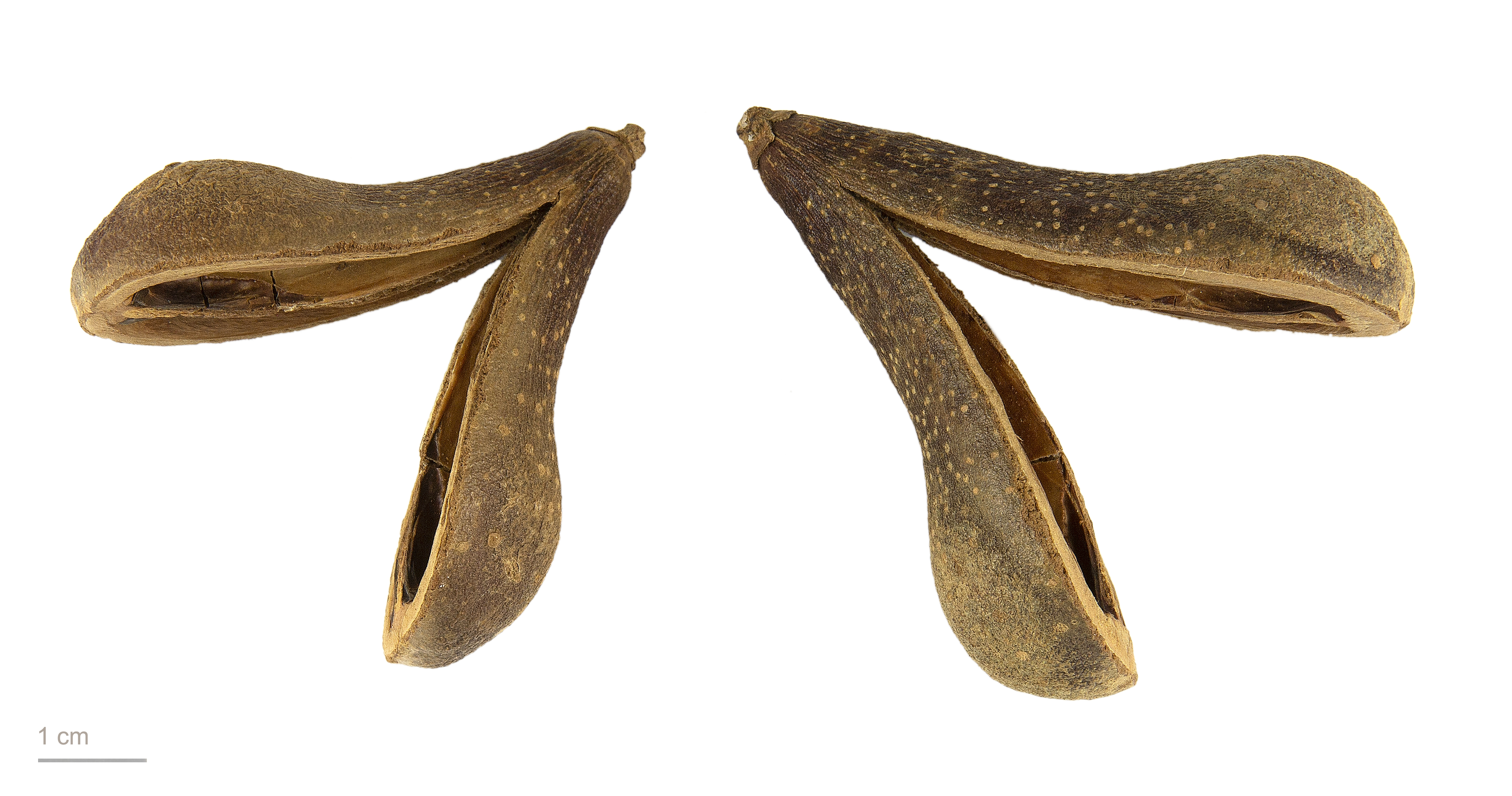
Schrebera arborea

Schrebera is a genus of plant in the family Oleaceae found in Peru, tropical and southern Africa, India and Southeast Asia. As of September 2013 the World Checklist of Selected Plant Families recognises 8 species:

- Schrebera alata (Hochst.) Welw. - eastern and southern Africa from Ethiopia to Eswatini
- Schrebera americana (Zahlbr.) Gilg - Peru
- Schrebera arborea A.Chev. - tropical Africa from Senegal to Kenya, south to Angola
- Schrebera capuronii Bosser & R.Rabev. - Madagascar
- Schrebera kusnotoi Kosterm. - Borneo
- Schrebera orientalis Bosser & R.Rabev. - Madagascar
- Schrebera swietenioides Roxb. - India, Himalayas, Indochina
- Schrebera trichoclada Welw. - eastern and central Africa (Tanzania, Zaire, Mozambique, Angola, etc.)
