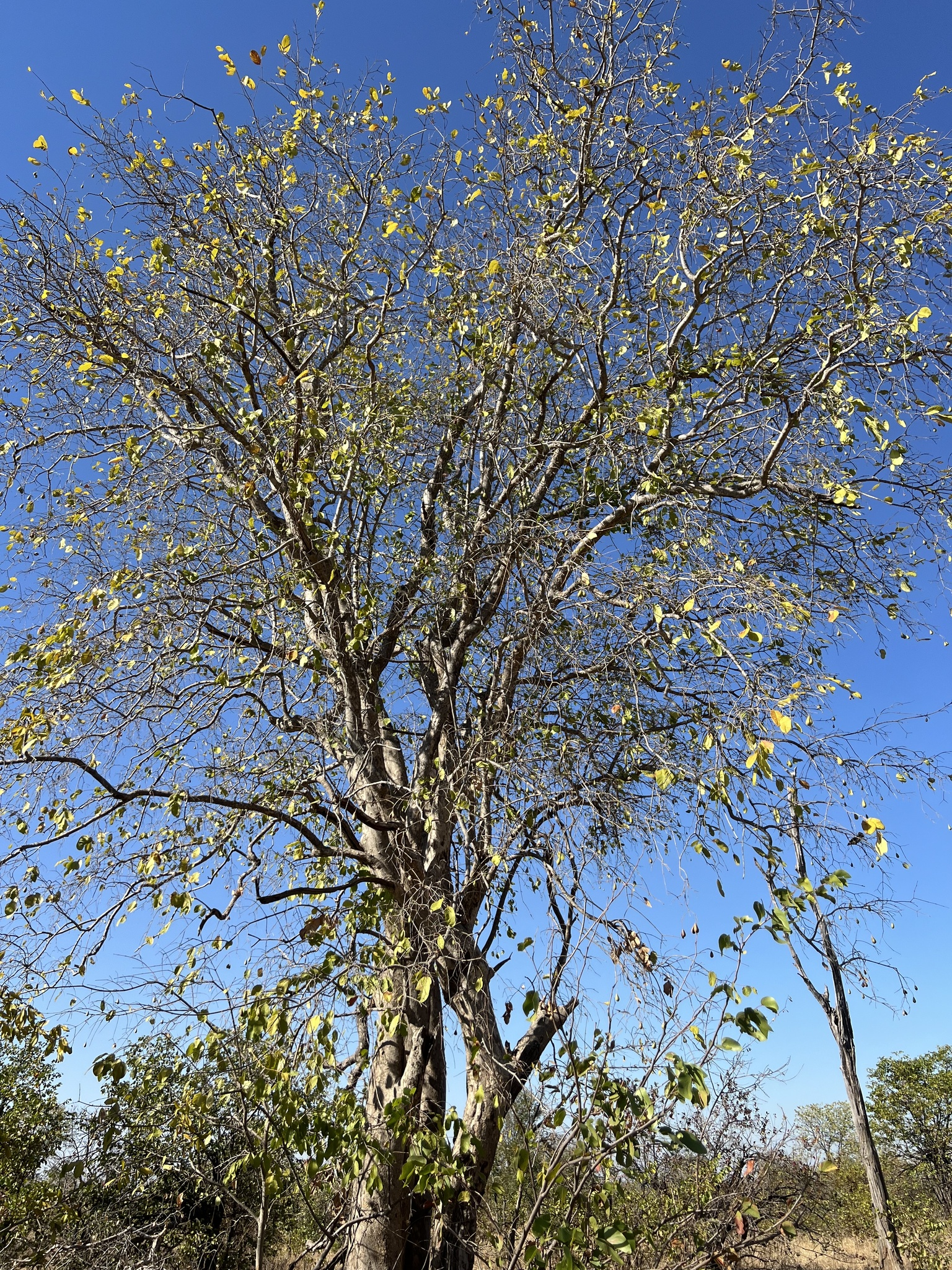
- In Zimbabwe

Conservation status
- Least Concern (IUCN 3.1)

Scientific classification
- Kingdom: Plantae
- Clade: Embryophytes
- Clade: Tracheophytes
- Clade: Angiosperms
- Clade: Eudicots
- Clade: Asterids
- Order: Lamiales
- Family: Oleaceae
- Genus: Schrebera
- Species: S. trichoclada

Binomial name
- Schrebera trichoclada Welw.

Synonyms
- List: Nathusia golungensis (Welw.) Kuntze; Nathusia trichoclada (Welw.) Kuntze; Schrebera affinis Lingelsh.; Schrebera buchananii Baker; Schrebera golungensis Welw.; Schrebera koiloneura Gilg; Schrebera oligantha Gilg; Schrebera platyphylla Gilg; Schrebera schellenbergii Lingelsh.

= Schrebera trichoclada =

Species of flowering plant

Schrebera trichoclada, the wing-leaved wooden pear, is a plant in the family Oleaceae.

== Description ==
Schrebera trichoclada grows as a shrub or bushy tree up to 10 metres (30 ft) tall. The fruit is pear-shaped, up to 6 cm (2 in) long.

== Distribution and habitat ==
Schrebera trichoclada is native to an area of southern tropical Africa from the Democratic Republic of the Congo southeast to Mozambique. Its habitat is deciduous woodland.
