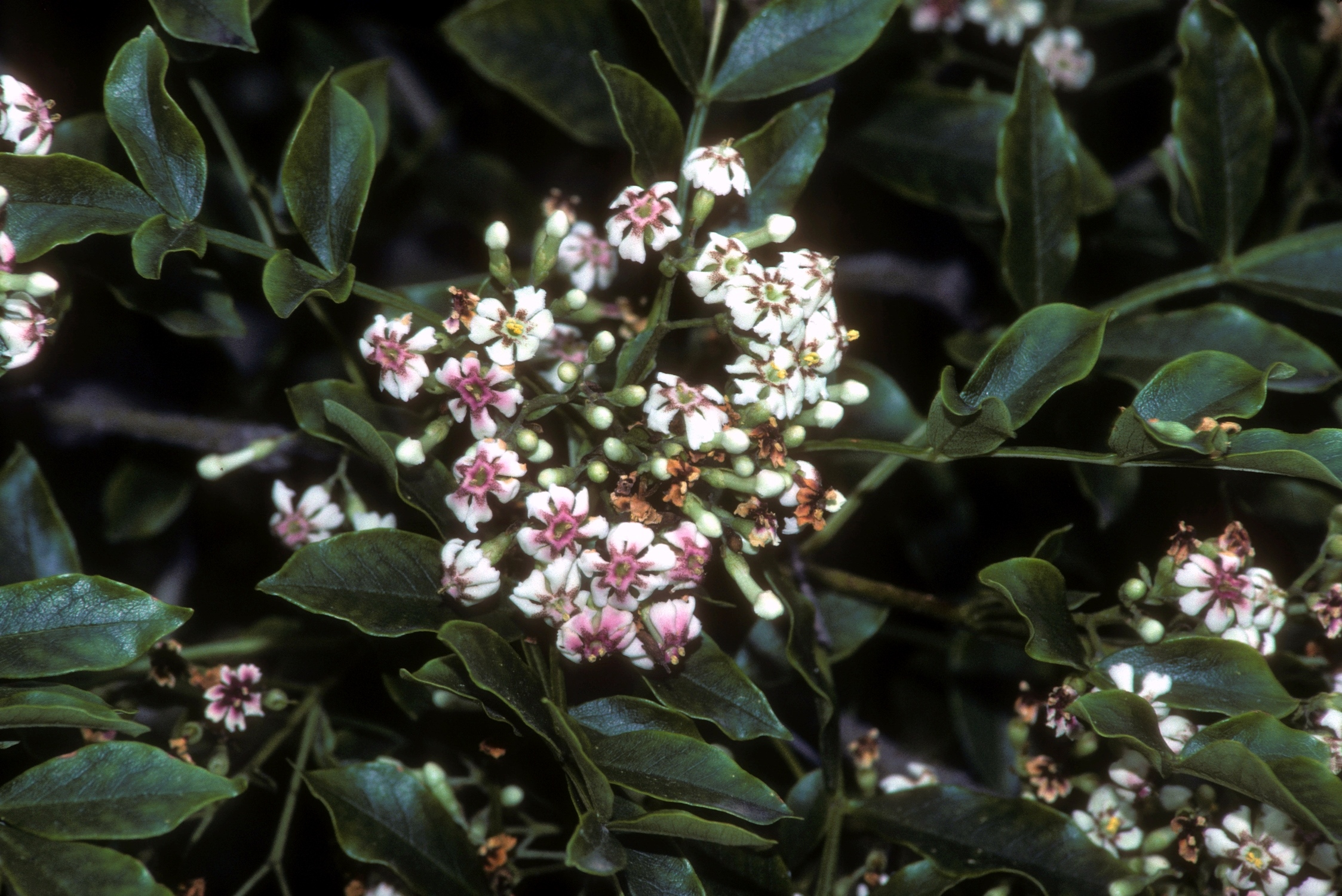

Conservation status
- Least Concern (IUCN 3.1)

Scientific classification
- Kingdom: Plantae
- Clade: Tracheophytes
- Clade: Angiosperms
- Clade: Eudicots
- Clade: Asterids
- Order: Lamiales
- Family: Oleaceae
- Genus: Schrebera
- Species: S. alata

Binomial name
- Schrebera alata (Hochst.) Welw.

Synonyms
- List: Nathusia alata Hochst.; Nathusia holstii Engl. & Gilg; Nathusia obliquifoliolata (Gilg) Chiov.; Schrebera argyrotricha Gilg; Schrebera excelsa Lingelsh.; Schrebera gilgiana Lingelsh.; Schrebera goetzeana Gilg; Schrebera greenwayi Turrill; Schrebera holstii (Engl. & Gilg) Gilg; Schrebera latialata Gilg; Schrebera mazoensis S.Moore; Schrebera merkeri Lingelsh.; Schrebera nyassae Lingelsh.; Schrebera obliquifoliolata Gilg; Schrebera saundersiae Harv.; Schrebera tomentella (Welw.) Gilg; Schrebera welwitschii Gilg

= Schrebera alata =

Species of plant

Schrebera alata is a plant in the family Oleaceae. It grows as a tree up to 15 m (50 ft) tall. The specific epithet alata is from the Latin meaning 'winged', referring to the petioles. Its habitat is forests and woodland from 1,000–1,800 m (3,000–6,000 ft) altitude. Schrebera alata is native Ethiopia, the Democratic Republic of the Congo, Uganda, Rwanda, Burundi, Kenya, Tanzania, Angola, Zambia, Zimbabwe, Malawi, Mozambique, Eswatini and South Africa.

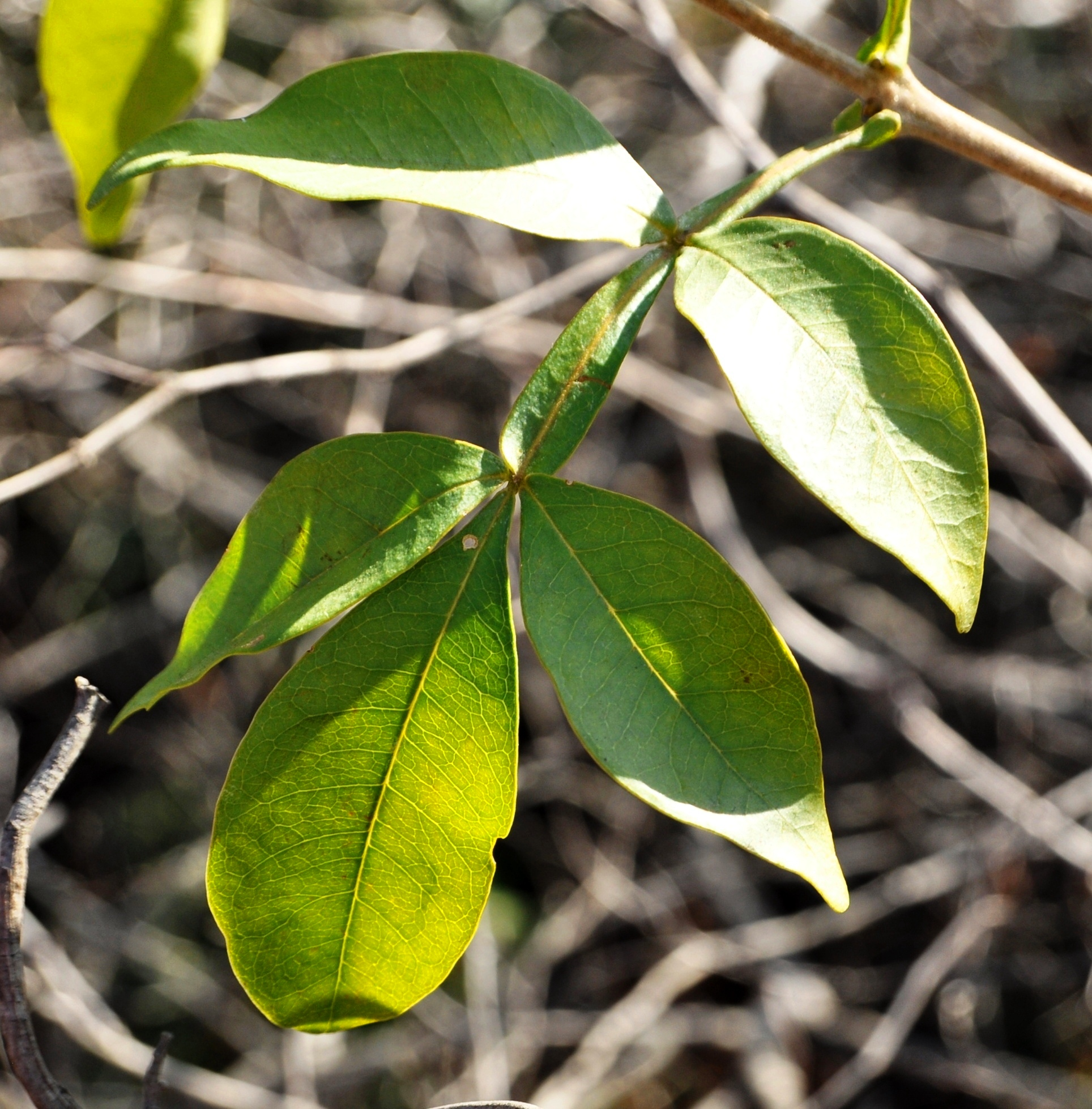
Leaves, with winged petioles

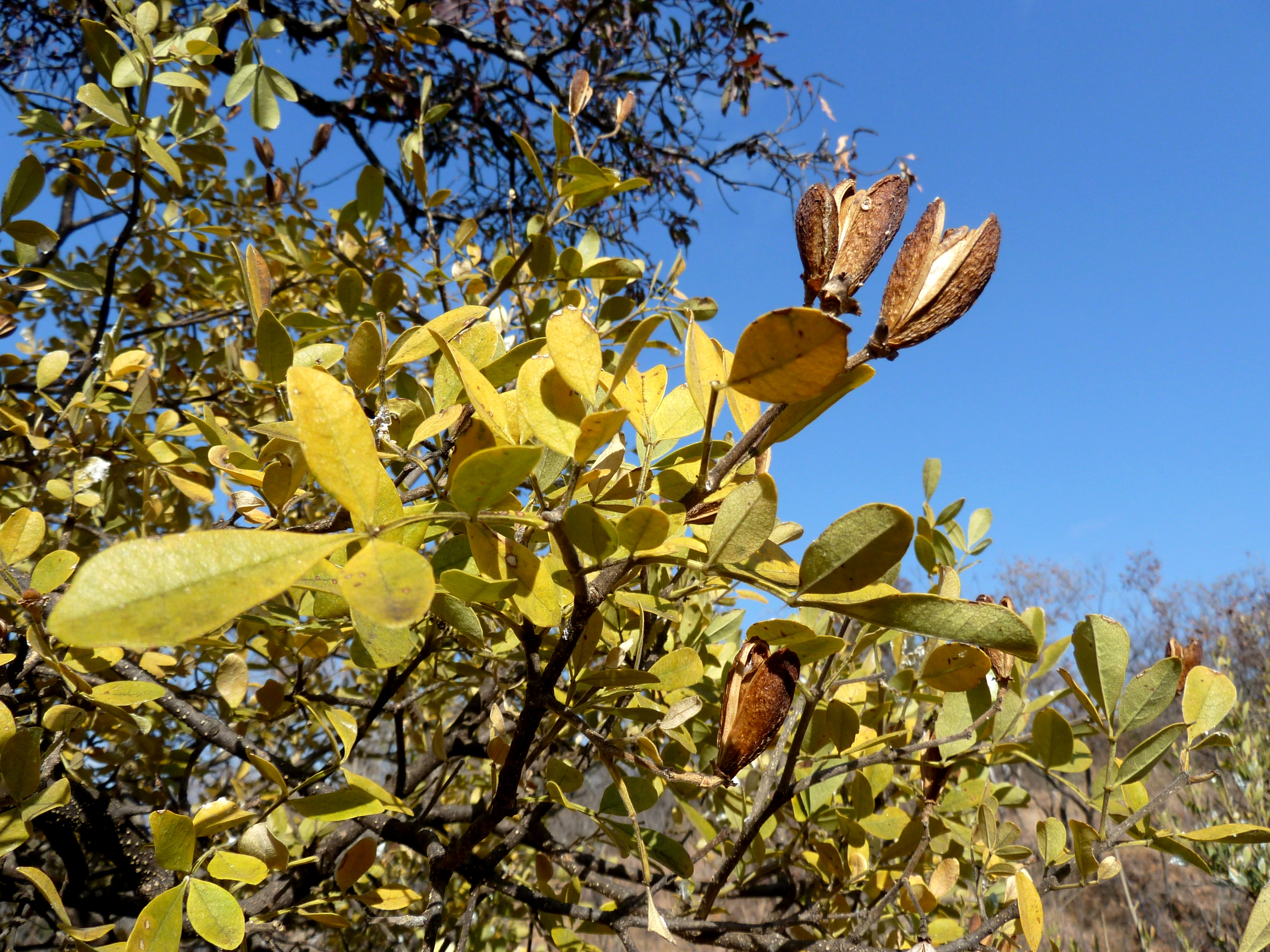
Fruit capsules
