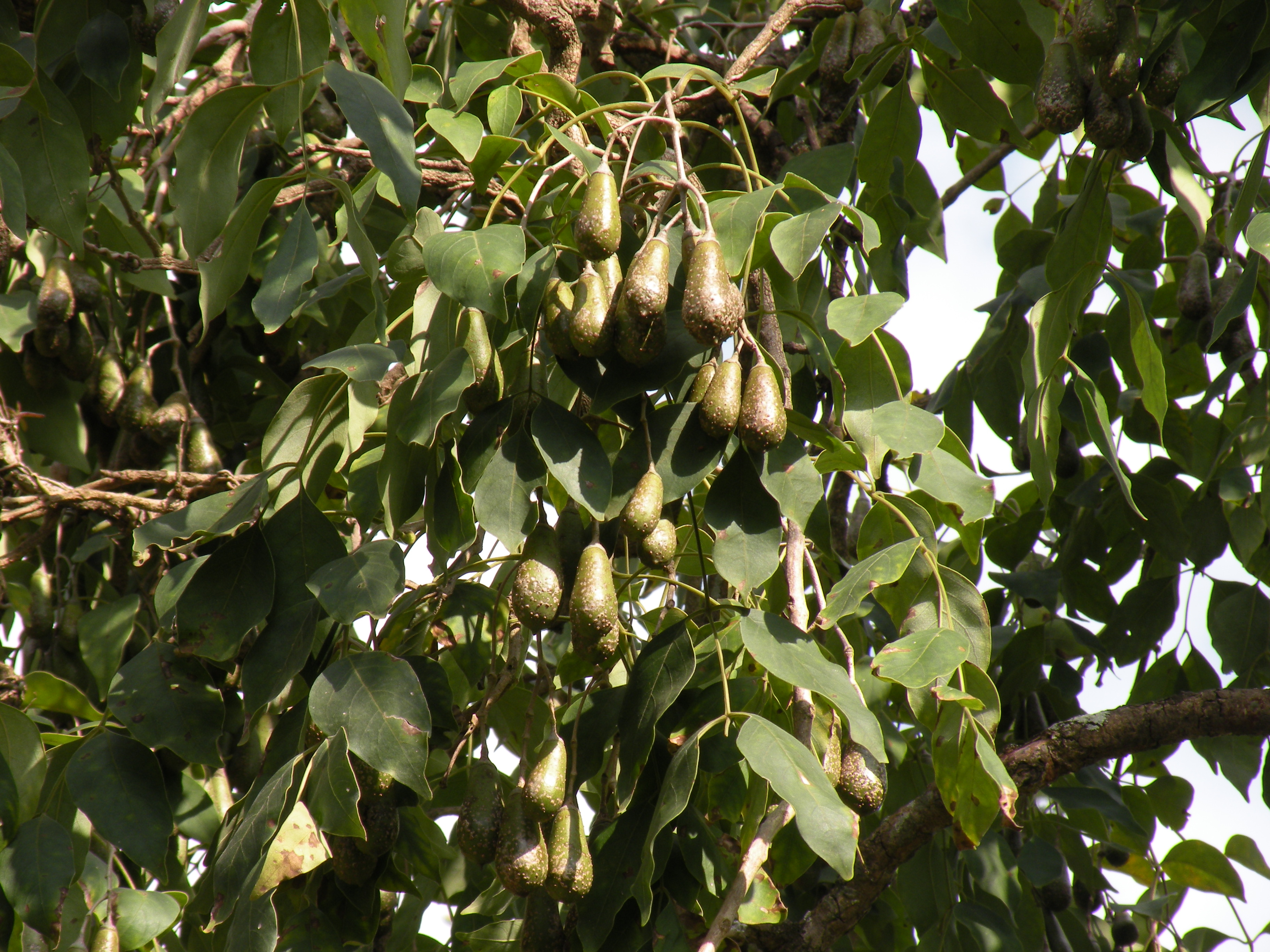

Scientific classification
- Kingdom: Plantae
- Clade: Tracheophytes
- Clade: Angiosperms
- Clade: Eudicots
- Clade: Asterids
- Order: Lamiales
- Family: Oleaceae
- Genus: Schrebera
- Species: S. swietenioides

Binomial name
- Schrebera swietenioides Roxb.

Synonyms
- Nathusia swietenioides (Roxb.) Kuntze; Schrebera pubescens Kurz; Schrebera swietenioides var. pubescens (Kurz) Kurz

= Schrebera swietenioides =

Flowering plant in the jasmine family

Schrebera swietenioides is a flowering plant in the family Oleaceae found in India, Bangladesh, Myanmar, Thailand, Cambodia and Laos. It prefers dry forests. It is commonly known as weaver's beam tree. Other names are mala plasu, muskkakavrksam, maggamaram', manimaram, mushkakavriksham, malamplasu and malamblasu. Flowering season is from February to April.

== Description ==
Leaves are compound, imparipinnate, opposite, estipulate; rachis 5–10 cm, slender, pubescent flowers are bisexual, yellowish brown, fragrant, 1 cm in size, nocturnal, in terminal, trichotomous cymes. Stigma is shortly bifid. Fruit is a pendulous capsule, 5 x 2.5 cm, obovoid, loculicidally 2 valved. The seeds are winged. Capsule is the size of a hen's egg, and pear shaped.

== In Thailand ==
In Thailand, this species is considered a rare plant, endemic to only a few places, such as Phu Wiang National Park, Khao Kradong Forest Park, etc. It is known as yoni pisaj (Thai: โยนีปีศาจ, "devil's vagina") or hee phi (หีผี, "ghost's pussy"), because the ripe fruit looks like female genitalia. There is a local legend that says that, Maiden Orapim, followed the man she loved, Prince Panjit, the son of Khmer King. The two were separated by a large, fast-flowing river. Orapim was afraid that crossing the river would be inconvenient because she was a woman, so she prayed to place her breasts on the wild cotton tree (Bombax ceiba) and her genital on weaver's beam tree, and so she transformed into a man and continued to search for Prince Panjit.
