= Schrebera kusnotoi =

Scientific classification
- Kingdom: Plantae
- Clade: Tracheophytes
- Clade: Angiosperms
- Clade: Eudicots
- Clade: Asterids
- Order: Lamiales
- Family: Oleaceae
- Genus: Schrebera
- Species: S. kusnotoi

Binomial name
- Schrebera kusnotoi Kosterm.

Species of tree

Schrebera kusnotoi is a plant in the family Oleaceae. It grows as a tree up to 45 metres (148 ft) tall with a trunk diameter of up to 90 centimetres (35 in). The flowers are white. Fruit is obovoid, up to 7 centimetres (2.8 in) long. Habitat is forests from sea level to 1,600 metres (5,200 ft) altitude. S. kusnotoi is endemic to Borneo.
