= Feather =

Body-covering structure of birds

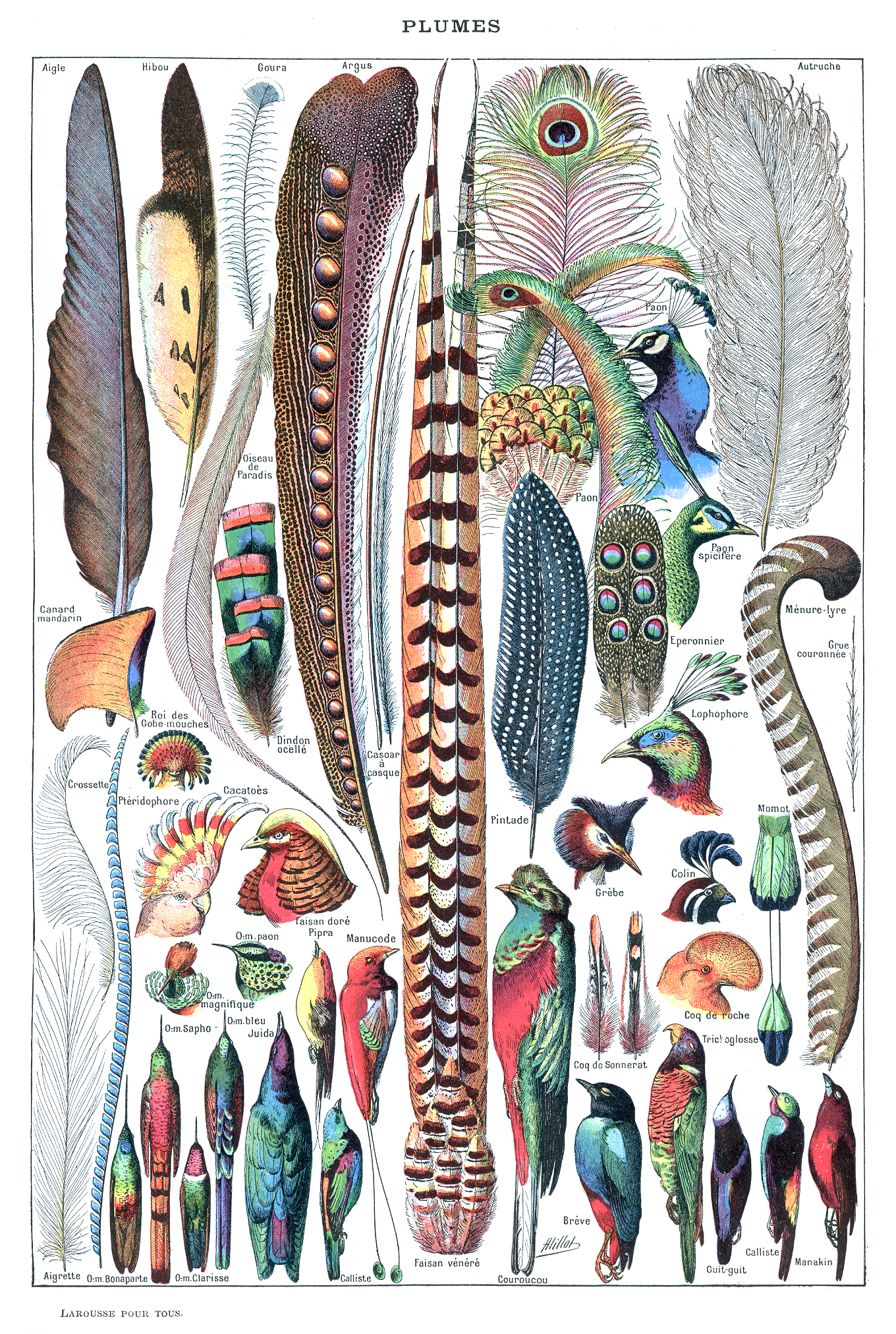
Feather variations

Feathers are epidermal growths that form a distinctive outer covering, or plumage, on both avian (bird) and some non-avian dinosaurs and other archosaurs. They are the most complex integumentary structures found in vertebrates and an example of a complex evolutionary novelty. They are among the characteristics that distinguish the extant birds from other living groups.

Although feathers cover most of the bird's body, they arise only from certain well-defined tracts on the skin. They aid in flight, thermal insulation, and waterproofing. In addition, coloration helps in communication and protection. The study of feathers is called plumology (or plumage science).

People use feathers in many ways that are practical, cultural, and religious. Feathers are both soft and excellent at trapping heat; thus, they are sometimes used in high-class bedding, especially pillows, blankets, and mattresses. They are also used as filling for winter clothing and outdoor bedding, such as quilted coats and sleeping bags. Goose and eider down have great loft, the ability to expand from a compressed, stored state to trap large amounts of compartmentalized, insulating air. Feathers of large birds (most often geese) have been and are used to make quill pens. Historically, the hunting of birds for decorative and ornamental feathers has endangered some species and helped to contribute to the extinction of others. Today, feathers used in fashion and in military headdresses and clothes are obtained as a waste product of poultry farming, including chickens, geese, turkeys, pheasants, and ostriches. These feathers are dyed and manipulated to enhance their appearance, as poultry feathers are naturally often dull in appearance compared to the feathers of wild birds.

== Etymology ==
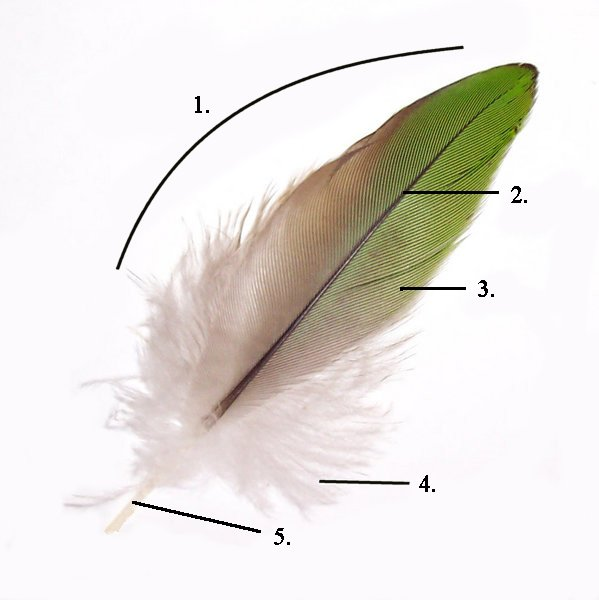
Parts of a feather: 1. Vane; 2. Shaft, rachis; 3. Barbs; 4. Aftershaft, afterfeather; 5. Quill, calamus

Feather derives from the Old English "feþer", which is of Germanic origin; related to Dutch "veer" and German "Feder", from an Indo-European root shared by Sanskrit's "patra" meaning 'wing', Latin's "penna" meaning 'feather', and Greek's "pteron", "pterux" meaning 'wing'.

Quills, which were early pens used for writing, were made from feathers. The word pen itself is derived from the Latin penna, meaning feather. The French word plume can mean feather, quill, or pen.

== Structures and characteristics ==
Feather microstructure showing interlocking barbules

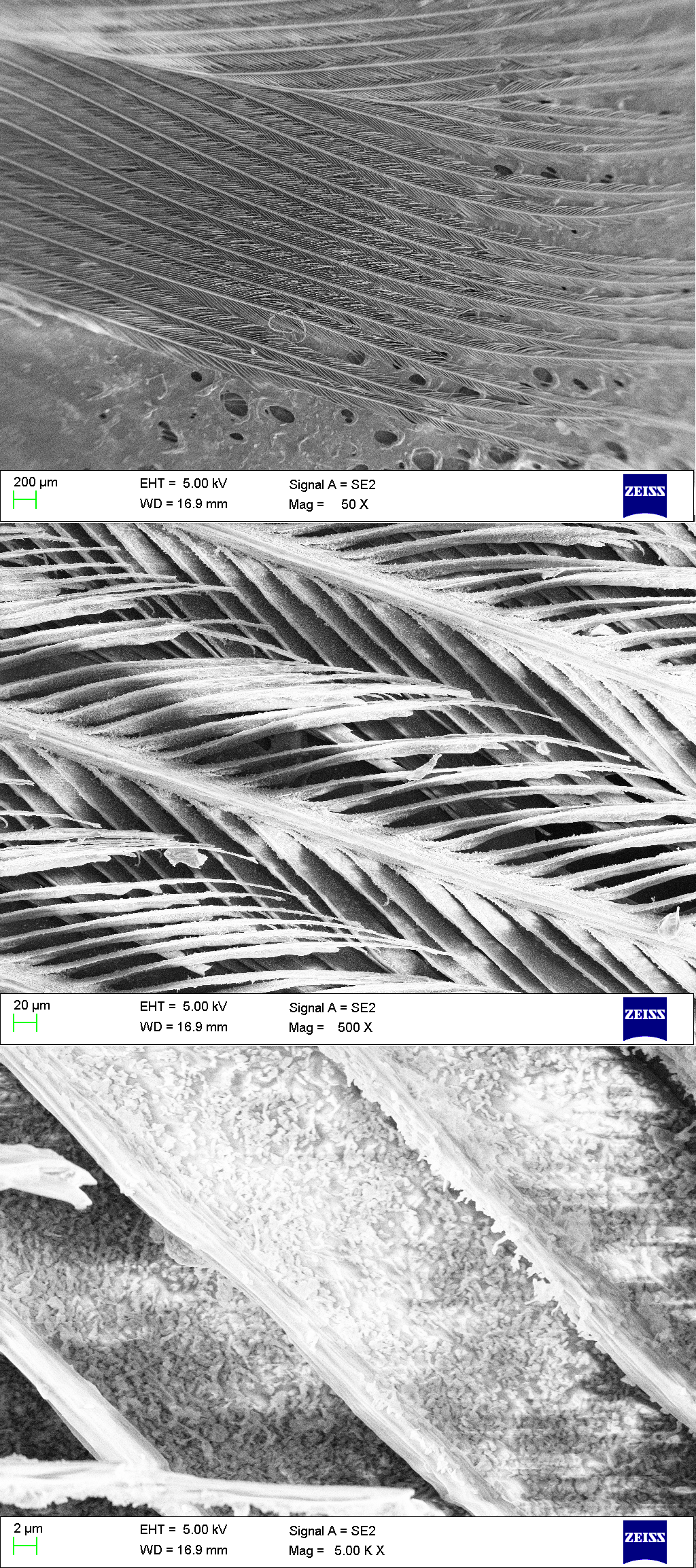
Anterior region of a contour feather from a rock dove, visualized using scanning electron microscopy. Interlocking barbules are clearly seen in the middle image.

Feathers are among the most complex integumentary appendages found in vertebrates and are formed in tiny follicles in the epidermis, or outer skin layer, that produce keratin proteins. The β-keratins in feathers, beaks and claws – and the claws, scales and shells of reptiles – are composed of protein strands hydrogen-bonded into β-pleated sheets, which are then further twisted and crosslinked by disulfide bridges into structures even tougher than the α-keratins of mammalian hair, horns and hooves. The exact signals that induce the growth of feathers on the skin are not known, but it has been found that the transcription factor cDermo-1 induces the growth of feathers on skin and scales on the leg.

=== Classification ===
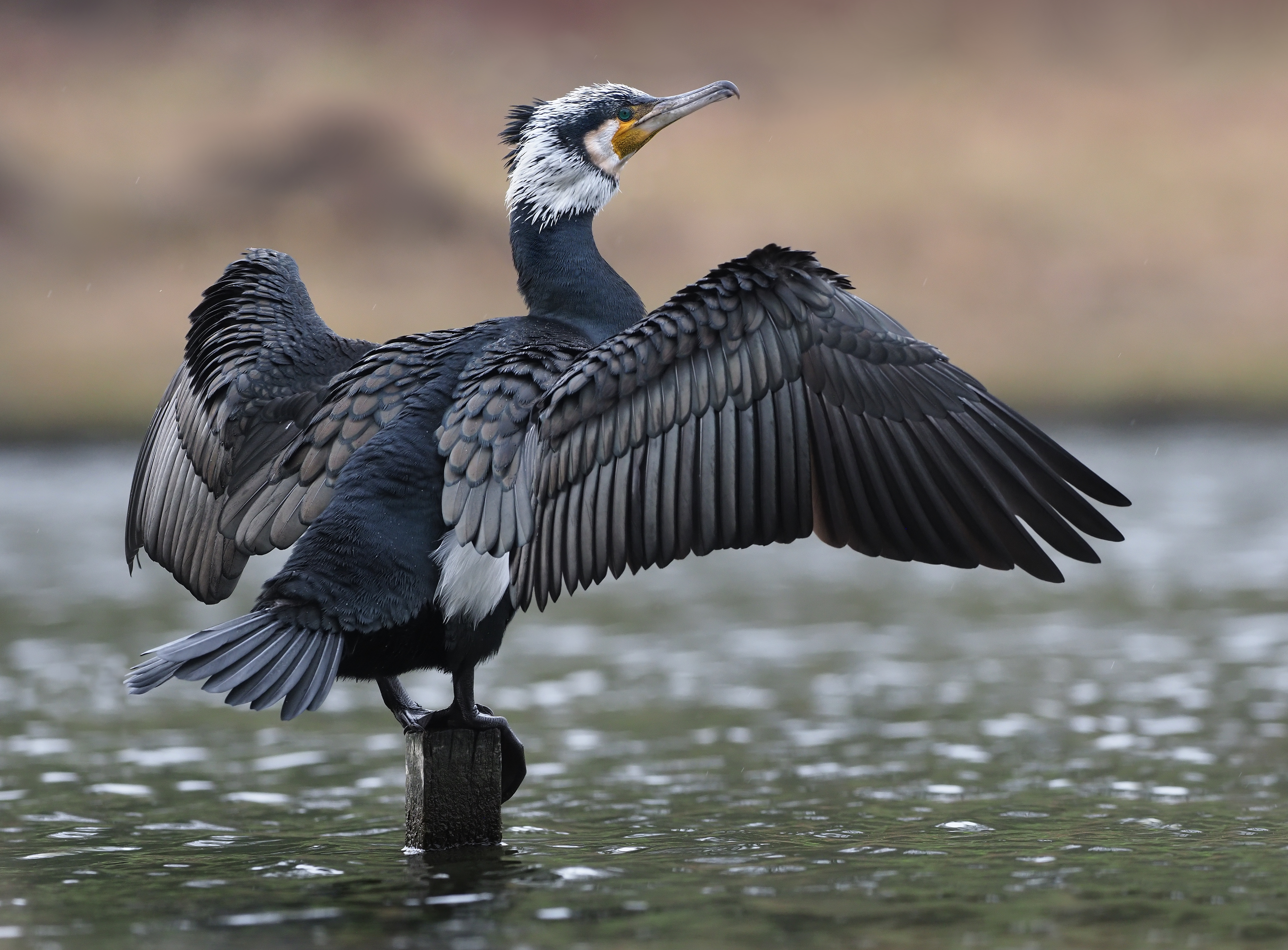
Filoplumes can be important in nuptial display; in the great cormorant they are white, and produced on the head and upper neck at the start of the breeding season, and shed soon after nesting.

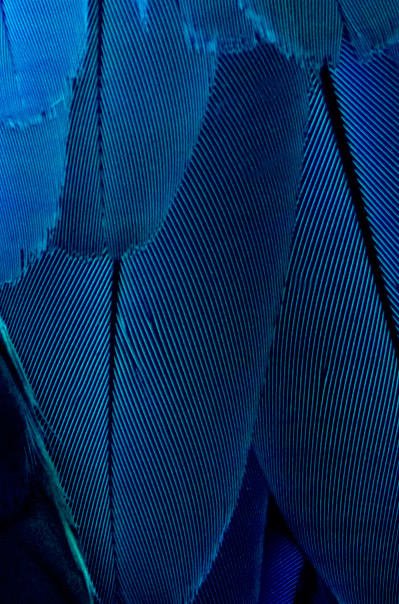
Feather structure of a blue-and-yellow macaw

There are two basic types of feather: vaned feathers which cover the exterior of the body, and down feathers which are underneath the vaned feathers. The pennaceous feathers are vaned feathers. Also called contour feathers, pennaceous feathers arise from tracts and cover the entire body. A third rarer type of feather, the filoplume, is hairlike and are closely associated with pennaceous feathers and are often entirely hidden by them, with one or two filoplumes attached and sprouting from near the same point of the skin as each pennaceous feather, at least on a bird's head, neck and trunk. Filoplumes are entirely absent in ratites. In some passerines, filoplumes arise exposed beyond the pennaceous feathers on the neck. The remiges, or flight feathers of the wing, and rectrices, or flight feathers of the tail, are the most important feathers for flight. A typical vaned feather features a main shaft, called the rachis. Fused to the rachis are a series of branches, or barbs; the barbs themselves are also branched and form the barbules. These barbules have minute hooks called barbicels for cross-attachment. Down feathers are fluffy because they lack barbicels, so the barbules float free of each other, allowing the down to trap air and provide excellent thermal insulation. At the base of the feather, the rachis expands to form the hollow tubular calamus (or quill) which inserts into a follicle in the skin. The basal part of the calamus is without vanes. This part is embedded within the skin follicle and has an opening at the base (proximal umbilicus) and a small opening on the side (distal umbilicus).

Hatchling birds of some species have a special kind of natal down feathers (neossoptiles) which are pushed out when the normal feathers (teleoptiles) emerge.

Flight feathers are stiffened so as to work against the air in the downstroke but yield in other directions. It has been observed that the orientation pattern of β-keratin fibers in the feathers of flying birds differs from that in flightless birds: the fibers are better aligned along the shaft axis direction towards the tip, and the lateral walls of rachis region show structure of crossed fibers.

=== Functions ===
Feathers insulate birds from water and cold temperatures. They may also be plucked to line the nest and provide insulation to the eggs and young. The individual feathers in the wings and tail play important roles in controlling flight. Some species have a crest of feathers on their heads. Although feathers are light, a bird's plumage weighs two or three times more than its skeleton, since many bones are hollow and contain air sacs. Color patterns serve as camouflage against predators for birds in their habitats, and serve as camouflage for predators looking for a meal. As with fish, the top and bottom colors may be different in order to provide camouflage during flight. Striking differences in feather patterns and colors are part of the sexual dimorphism of many bird species and are particularly important in the selection of mating pairs. In some cases, there are differences in the UV reflectivity of feathers across sexes, even though no differences in color are noted in the visible range. The wing feathers of male club-winged manakins Machaeropterus deliciosus have special structures that are used to produce sounds by stridulation.

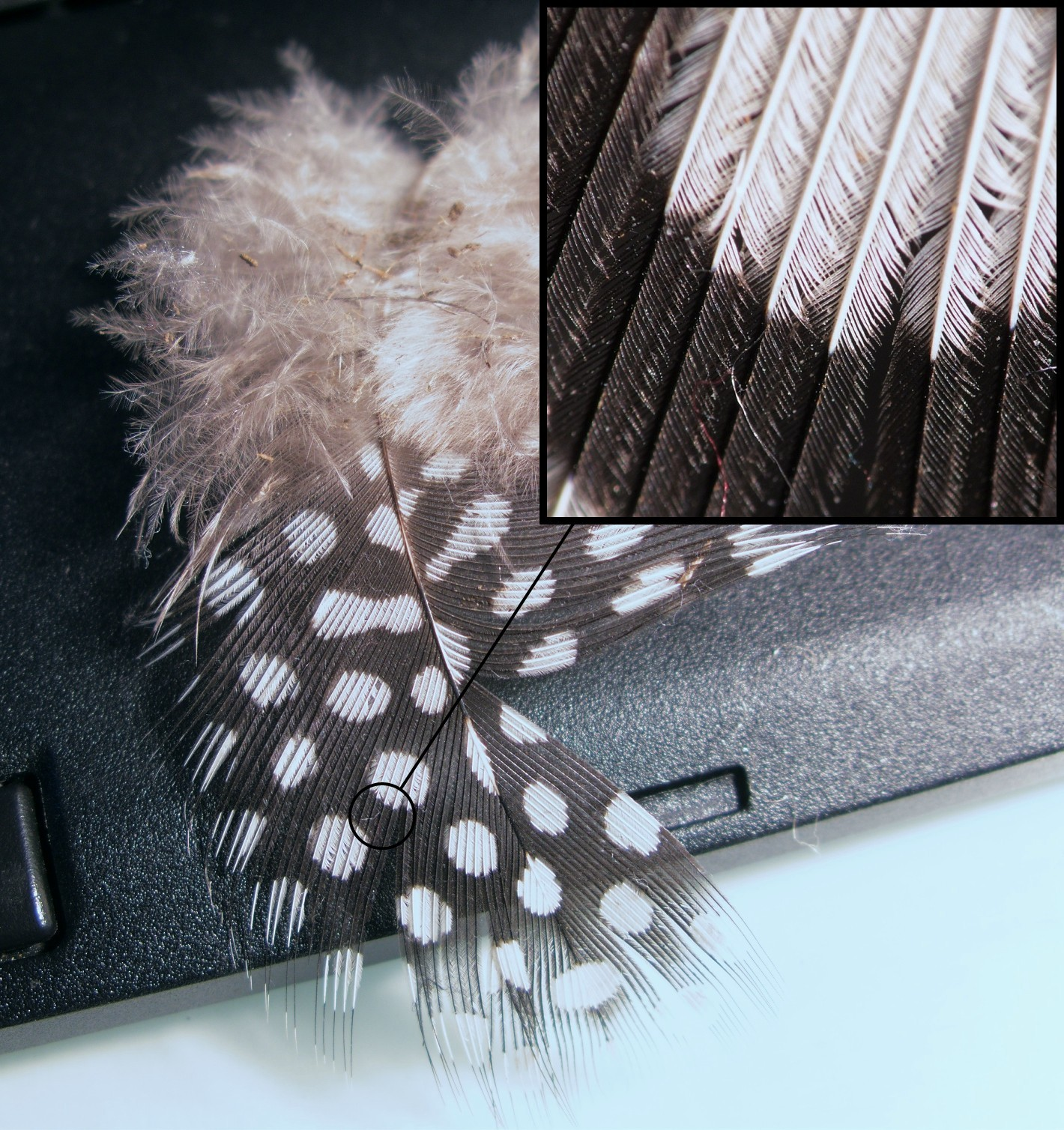
A contour feather from a Guinea fowl

Some birds have a supply of powder down feathers that grow continuously, with small particles regularly breaking off from the ends of the barbules. These particles produce a powder that sifts through the feathers on the bird's body and acts as a waterproofing agent and a feather conditioner. Powder down has evolved independently in several taxa and can be found in down as well as in pennaceous feathers. They may be scattered in plumage, as in the pigeons and parrots, or in localized patches on the breast, belly, or flanks, as in herons and frogmouths. Herons use their bill to break the powder down feathers and to spread them, while cockatoos may use their head as a powder puff to apply the powder. Waterproofing can be lost by exposure to emulsifying agents due to human pollution. Feathers can then become waterlogged, causing the bird to sink. It is also very difficult to clean and rescue birds whose feathers have been fouled by oil spills. The feathers of cormorants soak up water and help to reduce buoyancy, thereby allowing the birds to swim submerged.

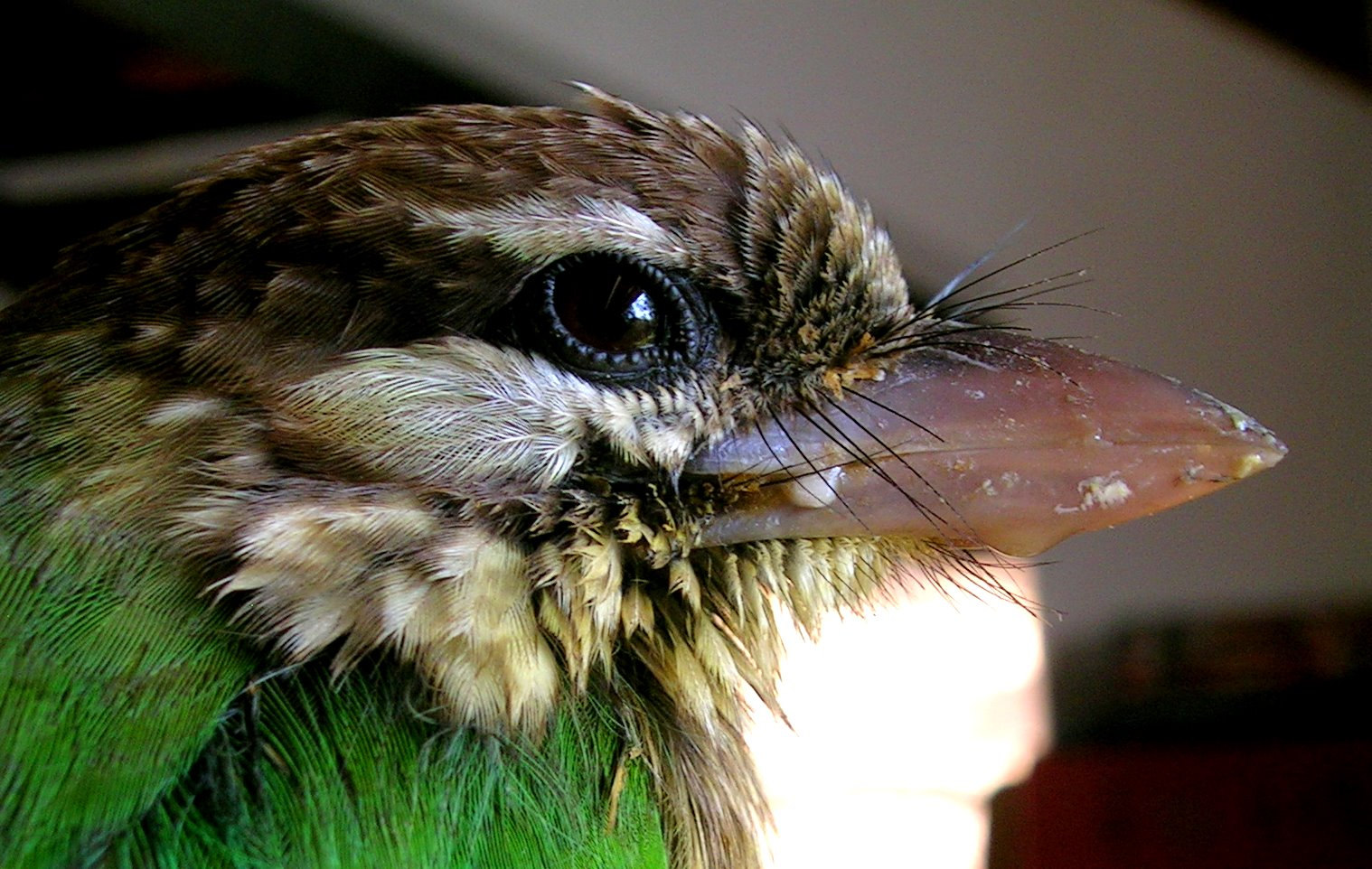
Rictal bristles of a white-cheeked barbet

Bristles are stiff, tapering feathers with a large rachis but few barbs. Rictal bristles are found around the eyes and bill. They may serve a similar purpose to eyelashes and vibrissae in mammals. Although there is as yet no clear evidence, it has been suggested that rictal bristles have sensory functions and may help insectivorous birds to capture prey. In one study, willow flycatchers (Empidonax traillii) were found to catch insects equally well before and after removal of the rictal bristles.

Grebes are peculiar in their habit of ingesting their own feathers and feeding them to their young. Observations on their diet of fish and the frequency of feather eating suggest that ingesting feathers, particularly down from their flanks, aids in forming easily ejectable pellets.

=== Distribution ===
Feather tracts or pterylae and their naming

Contour feathers are not uniformly distributed on the skin of the bird except in some groups such as the penguins, ratites and screamers. In most birds the feathers grow from specific tracts of skin called pterylae; between the pterylae there are regions which are free of feathers called apterylae (or apteria). Filoplumes and down may arise from the apterylae. The arrangement of these feather tracts, pterylosis or pterylography, varies across bird families and has been used in the past as a means for determining the evolutionary relationships of bird families. Species that incubate their own eggs often lose their feathers on a region of their belly, forming a brooding patch.

=== Coloration ===
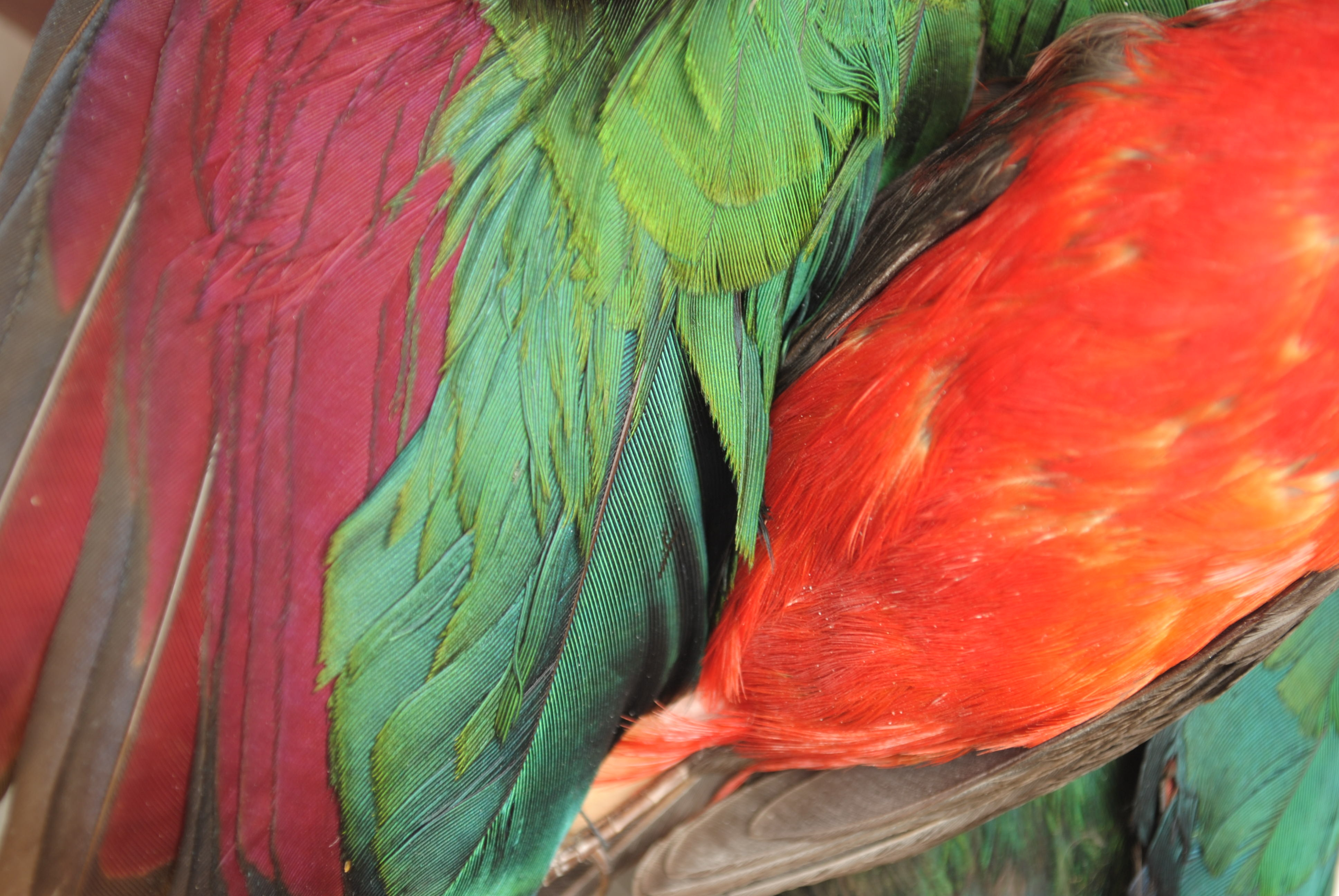
Colors resulting from different feather pigments Left: turacin (red) and turacoverdin (green, with some structural blue iridescence at lower end) on the wing of Tauraco bannermani Right: carotenoids (red) and melanins (dark) on belly/wings of Ramphocelus bresilius

The colors of feathers are produced by pigments, by microscopic structures that can refract, reflect, or scatter selected wavelengths of light, or by a combination of both.

Most feather pigments are melanins (brown and beige pheomelanins, black and grey eumelanins) and carotenoids (red, yellow, orange); other pigments occur only in certain taxa – the yellow to red psittacofulvins (found in some parrots) and the red turacin and green turacoverdin (porphyrin pigments found only in turacos).

Structural coloration is involved in the production of blue colors, iridescence, most ultraviolet reflectance and in the enhancement of pigmentary colors. Structural iridescence has been reported in fossil feathers dating back 40 million years. White feathers lack pigment and scatter light diffusely; albinism in birds is caused by defective pigment production, though structural coloration will not be affected (as can be seen, for example, in blue-and-white budgerigars).

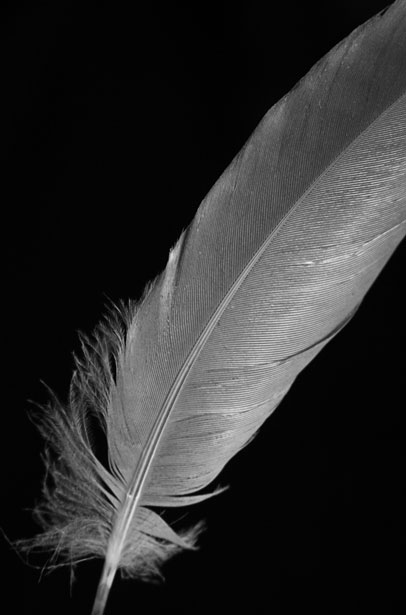
A feather with no pigment

The blues and bright greens of many parrots are produced by constructive interference of light reflecting from different layers of structures in feathers. In the case of green plumage, in addition to yellow, the specific feather structure involved is called by some the Dyck texture. Melanin is often involved in the absorption of light; in combination with a yellow pigment, it produces a dull olive-green.

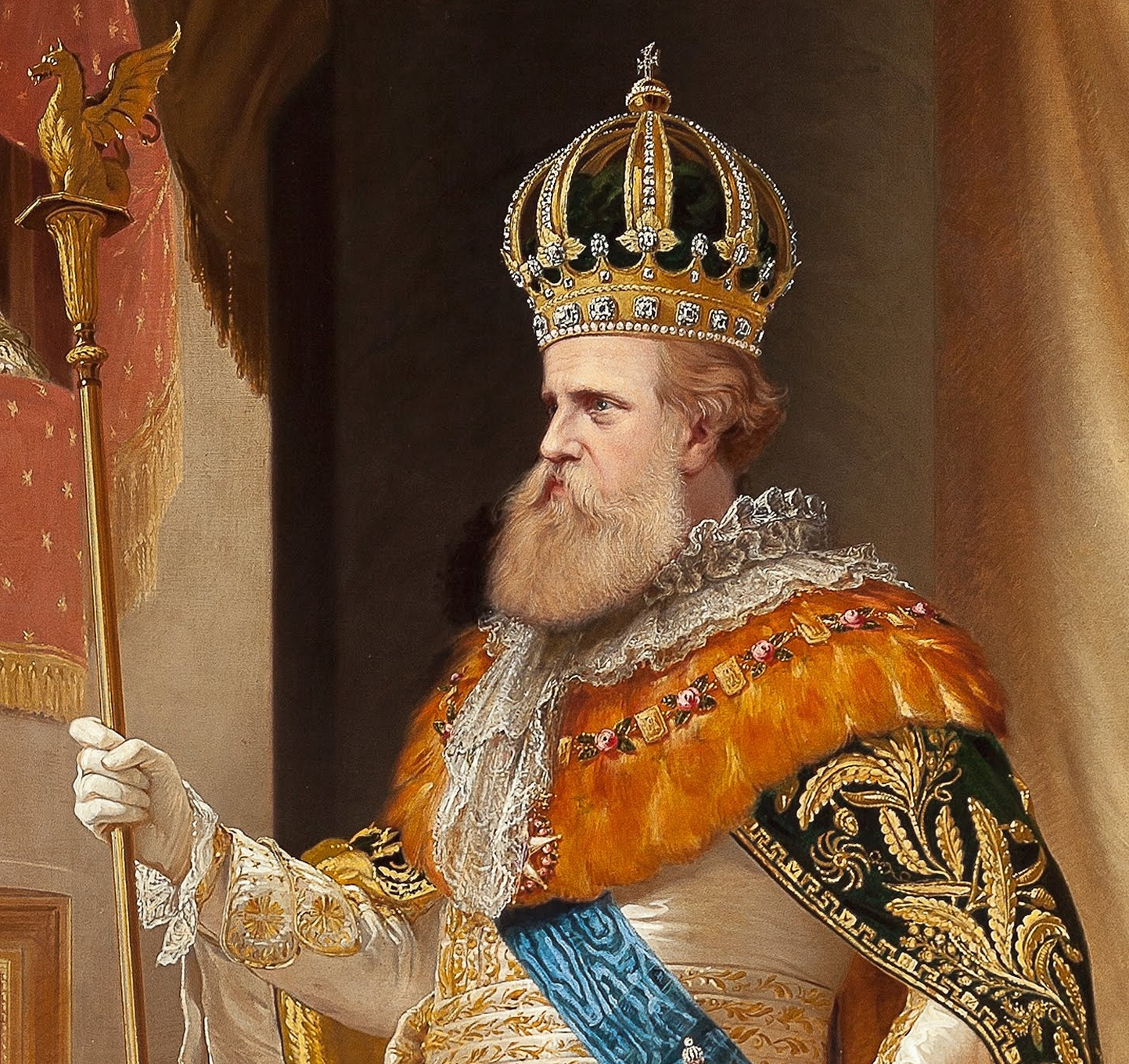
Emperor Pedro II of Brazil wearing a wide collar of orange toucan feathers around his shoulders and elements of the Imperial Regalia. Detail from a painting by Pedro Américo

In some birds, feather colors may be created, or altered, by secretions from the uropygial gland, also called the preen gland. The yellow bill colors of many hornbills are produced by such secretions. It has been suggested that there are other color differences that may be visible only in the ultraviolet region, but studies have failed to find evidence. The oil secretion from the uropygial gland may also have an inhibitory effect on feather bacteria.

The reds, orange and yellow colors of many feathers are caused by various carotenoids. Carotenoid-based pigments might be honest signals of fitness because they are derived from special diets and hence might be difficult to obtain, and/or because carotenoids are required for immune function and hence sexual displays come at the expense of health.

A bird's feathers undergo wear and tear and are replaced periodically during the bird's life through molting. New feathers, known when developing as blood, or pin feathers, depending on the stage of growth, are formed through the same follicles from which the old ones were fledged. The presence of melanin in feathers increases their resistance to abrasion. One study notes that melanin based feathers were observed to degrade more quickly under bacterial action, even compared to unpigmented feathers from the same species, than those unpigmented or with carotenoid pigments. However, another study the same year compared the action of bacteria on pigmentations of two song sparrow species and observed that the darker pigmented feathers were more resistant; the authors cited other research also published in 2004 that stated increased melanin provided greater resistance. They observed that the greater resistance of the darker birds confirmed Gloger's rule.

Although sexual selection plays a major role in the development of feathers, in particular, the color of the feathers it is not the only conclusion available. New studies are suggesting that the unique feathers of birds are also a large influence on many important aspects of avian behavior, such as the height at which different species build their nests. Since females are the prime caregivers, evolution has helped select females to display duller colors down so that they may blend into the nesting environment. The position of the nest and whether it has a greater chance of being under predation has exerted constraints on female birds' plumage. A species of bird that nests on the ground, rather than the canopy of the trees, will need to have much duller colors in order not to attract attention to the nest. The height study found that birds that nest in the canopies of trees often have many more predator attacks due to the brighter color of feathers that the female displays. Another influence of evolution that could play a part in why feathers of birds are so colorful and display so many patterns could be due to that birds developed their bright colors from the vegetation and flowers that thrive around them. Birds develop their bright colors from living around certain colors. Most bird species often blend into their environment, due to some degree of camouflage, so if the species habitat is full of colors and patterns, the species would eventually evolve to blend in to avoid being eaten. Birds' feathers show a large range of colors, even exceeding the variety of many plants, leaf, and flower colors.

=== Feathers used in mating displays ===
In sexually dimorphic birds, males often develop distinct coloration or specialized ornamental feathers used in mating displays to attract mates. There are several proposed theories for the origin of ornamental feathers, with the first observed instances being observed in multiple early theropods (see subsection on Origins below).

The most well-known example of ornamental feathers used in mating is male peacocks (Pavo cristatus). Males sport a long train of covert feathers with distinct eyespot patterns, which are coupled with a vigorous display in the courtship process. When performing these displays, males flash their train in a fanning motion, showing their plumage off to females.

The evolutionary origin of the peacock's ornamental feathers and display remains unclear, with multiple theories proposing a combination of factors. In a study observing peacock display behavior, captive male peacocks had the length of their trains, the length of their torsi, and the density of the eyespots measured. They were then released into enclosures with female peacocks, with their mating success measured in successful copulations. The results showed that female choice was not influenced by train size, but by eyespot density. This suggests that male peacocks' elaborate feathers and displays evolved as a result of female choice, particularly favoring males with more eyespot patterns.

==== Structure and use ====
The bone morphology of the radius, ulna, and humerus which support ornamental feathers can also affect female choice. For example, the bone morphology of male club-winged manakins (Machaeropterus deliciosus) is highly specialized, with larger and denser ulnas that are bigger in volume and have higher mineral density compared to others in the manakin family. The secondary feathers are enlarged and are used in mating displays; males knock the tips of the enlarged feathers together repeatedly in a "jump and snap" motion, producing a distinctive sound. The display ends with a "beard up" motion, in which the male shows off their long yellow throat feathers rapidly while performing jumps.

==== Tail length ====
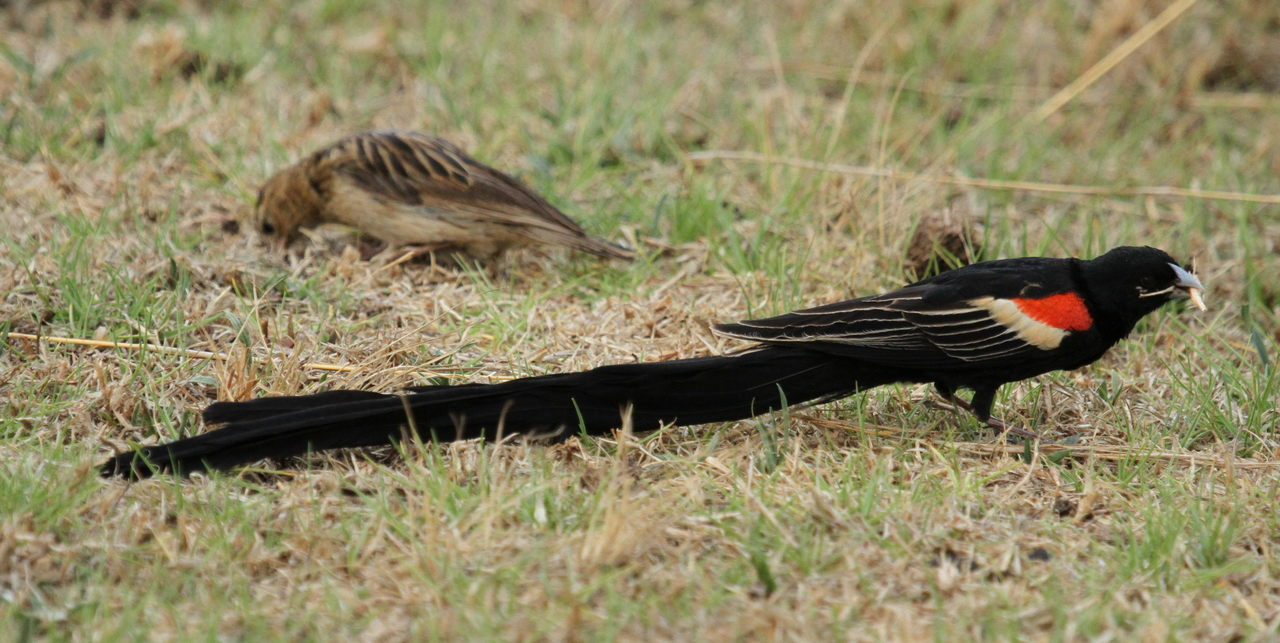
Male and female long-tailed widowbirds

Tail length is another example of feathers playing a role in mate choice, as seen in the long-tailed widowbird (Euplectes progne). The males of this species have extremely long tail feathers during the mating season, which correlates with higher success in attracting mates. In a famous study testing the correlation between tail length and fitness, male widowbirds had their tail lengths artificially shortened or elongated and those with elongated tails had higher mating success. It was alternatively proposed that longer ornamental feathers played a role in territory defense and intrasexual competition, as a way of displaying dominance, but there was no substantial evidence supporting this theory.

==== Origin of ornamental feathers ====
One possible origin of ornamental feathers is in the megalosauroid Sciurumimus, which have a simple, monofilamentous morphology. Monofilamentous feathers have a single, thread-like structure, as opposed to branches or barbs, and are considered to be the earliest form of feather. Monofilamentous feathers have also been found in a wide range of taxa, though Sciurumimus was the earliest. Monofilamentous feathers have also been found in the tyrannosauroid Yutyrannus and the therizinosauroid Beipiaosaurus, with proportionally broader monofilaments that were likely a form of early specialized ornamental feathers.

An analysis of feathers discovered in Burmese amber revealed unusual coloration along the rachis, suggesting they bore striking color patterns. Early ornamental feathers in the genus Schizooura suggest an aerodynamic use as well as an ornamental one, with the pin-tailed shape being too narrow to impact aerodynamics.

== Parasites ==
The feather surface is the home for some ectoparasites, notably feather lice (Phthiraptera) and feather mites. Feather lice typically live on a single host and can move only from parents to chicks, between mating birds, and, occasionally, by phoresy. This life history has resulted in most of the parasite species being specific to the host and coevolving with the host, making them of interest in phylogenetic studies.

Feather holes are chewing traces of lice (most probably Brueelia spp. lice) on the wing and tail feathers. They were described on barn swallows, and because of easy countability, many evolutionary, ecological, and behavioral publications use them to quantify the intensity of infestation.

Parasitic cuckoos which grow up in the nests of other species also have host-specific feather lice and these seem to be transmitted only after the young cuckoos leave the host nest.

Birds maintain their feather condition by preening and bathing in water or dust. It has been suggested that a peculiar behavior of birds, anting, in which ants are introduced into the plumage, helps to reduce parasites, but no supporting evidence has been found.

== Human usage ==
=== Utilitarian ===
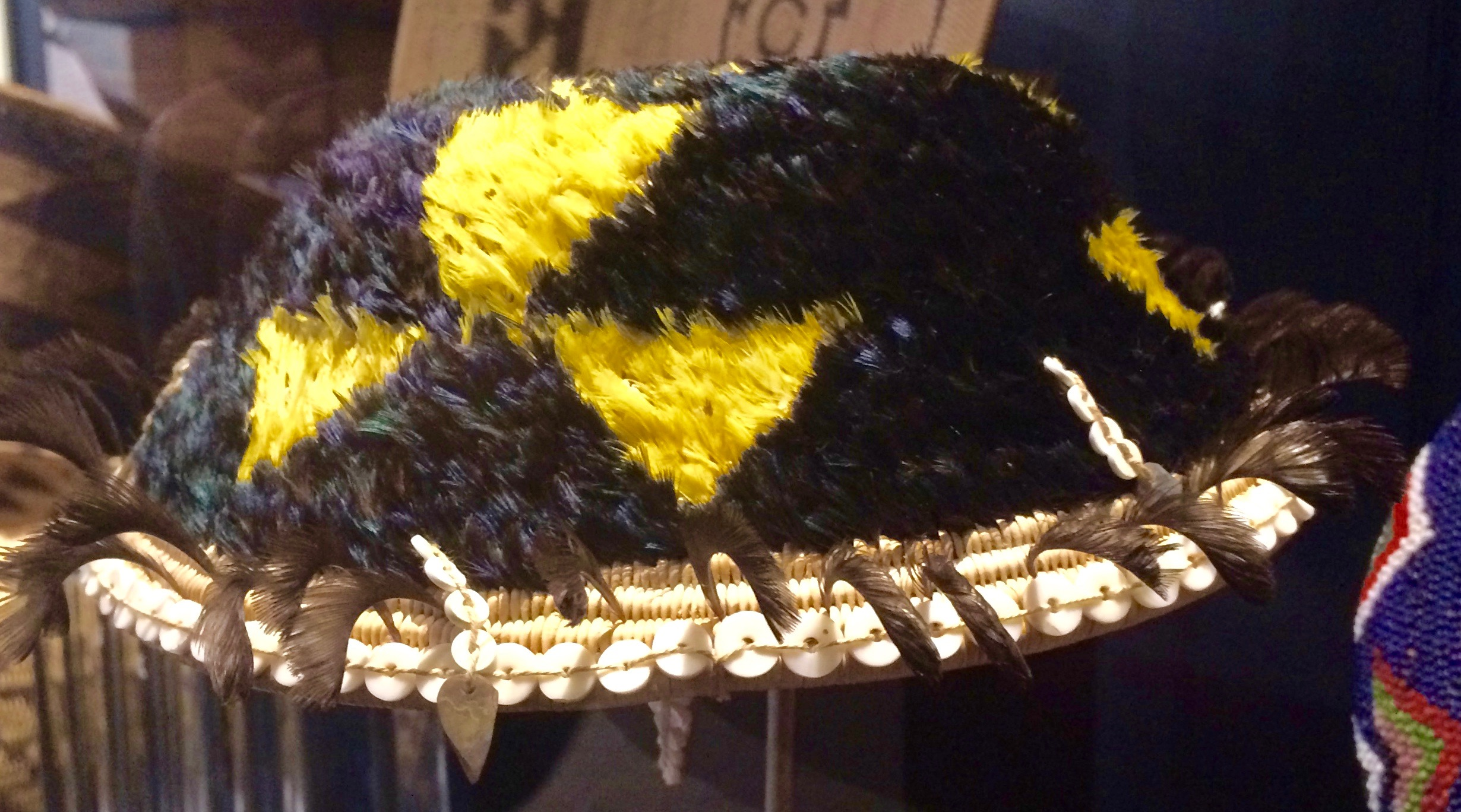
Pomo fully feathered basket curated at the Jesse Peter Multicultural Museum, Santa Rosa College

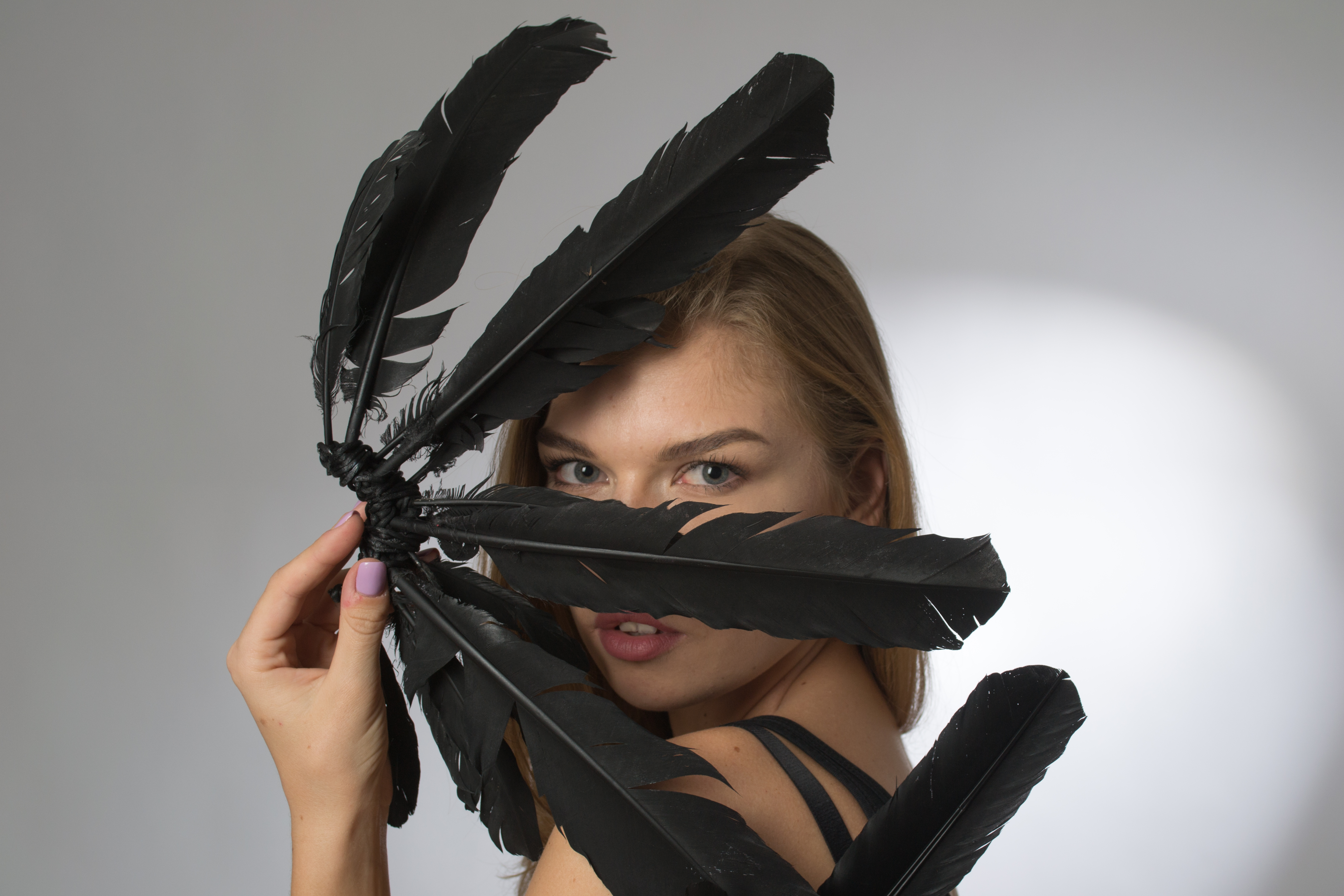
Female model with feathers

Bird feathers have long been used for fletching arrows. Colorful feathers such as those belonging to pheasants have been used to decorate fishing lures.

Down feathers are used as an insulating material for outerwear and bedding. The most commercially valuable down is gathered from wild eiders, but more commonly it is harvested from domestic geese or ducks.

Feathers are also valuable in aiding the identification of species in forensic studies, particularly in bird strikes to aircraft. The ratios of hydrogen isotopes in feathers help in determining the geographic origins of birds. Feathers may also be useful in the non-destructive sampling of pollutants.

The poultry industry produces a large amount of feathers as waste, which, like other forms of keratin, are slow to decompose. Feather waste has been used in a number of industrial applications as a medium for culturing microbes, biodegradable polymers, and production of enzymes. Feather proteins have been tried as an adhesive for wood board.

Some groups of Native people in Alaska have used ptarmigan feathers as temper (non-plastic additives) in pottery manufacture since the first millennium BC in order to promote thermal shock resistance and strength.

=== In religion and culture ===
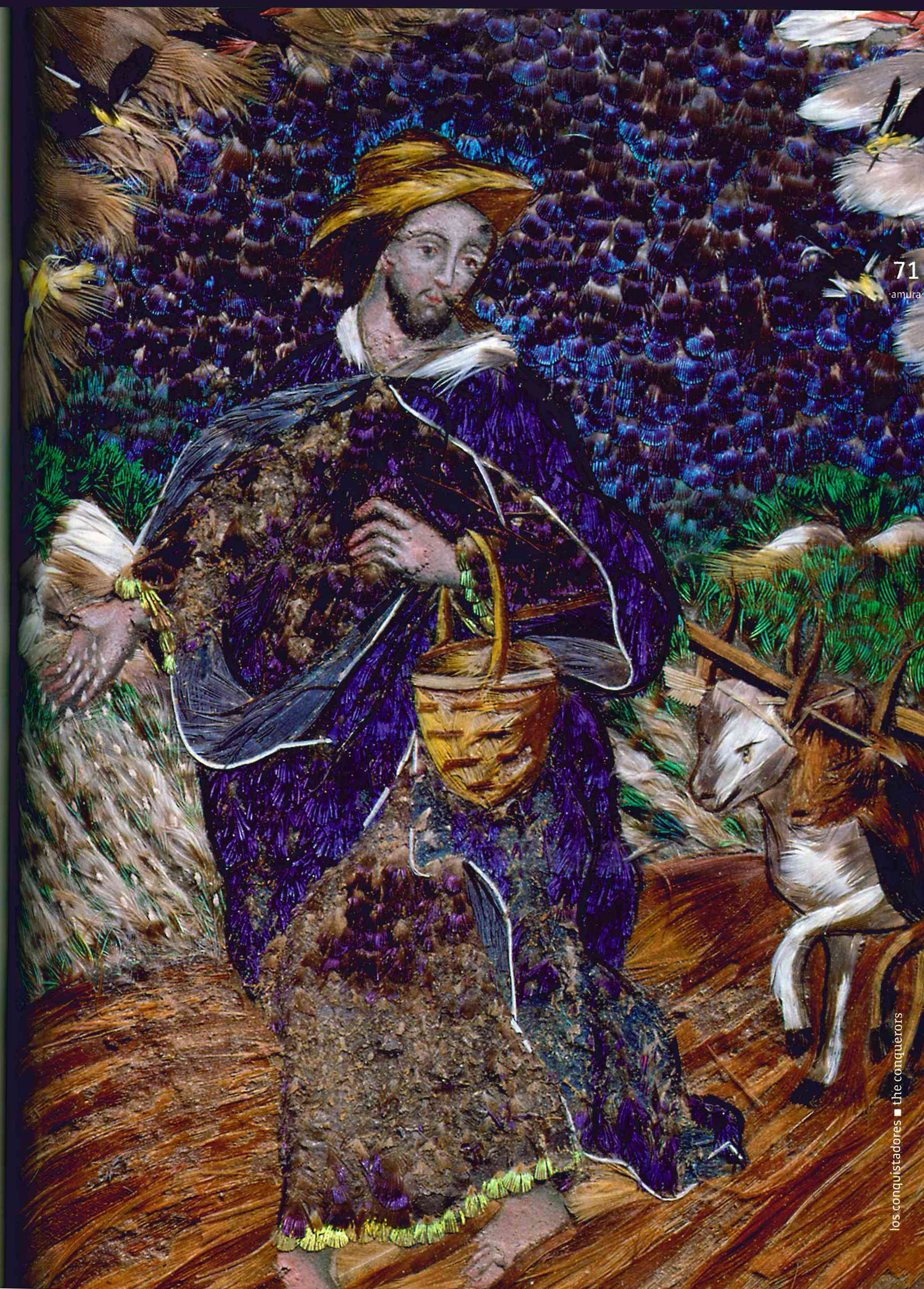
Mexican featherwork painting of Isidore the Laborer made from duck, hummingbird, and canary feathers. This style of painting, popular during the Novohispanic era, integrates featherwork of pre-Hispanic origin with Christian iconography. 18th century, Museo Soumaya

Eagle feathers have great cultural and spiritual value to Native Americans in the United States and First Nations peoples in Canada as religious objects. In the United States, the religious use of eagle and hawk feathers is governed by the eagle feather law, a federal law limiting the possession of eagle feathers to certified and enrolled members of federally recognized Native American tribes.

In South America, brews made from the feathers of condors are used in traditional medications. In India, feathers of the Indian peacock have been used in traditional medicine for snakebite, infertility, and coughs.

Members of Scotland's Clan Campbell are known to wear feathers on their bonnets to signify authority within the clan. Clan chiefs wear three, chieftains wear two and an armiger wears one. Any member of the clan who does not meet the criteria is not authorized to wear feathers as part of traditional garb and doing so is considered presumptuous.

During the 18th, 19th, and early 20th centuries, there was a booming international trade in plumes for extravagant women's hats and other headgear (including in Victorian fashion). Frank Chapman noted in 1886 that feathers of as many as 40 species of birds were used in about three-fourths of the 700 ladies' hats that he observed in New York City. For instance, South American hummingbird feathers were used in the past to dress some of the miniature birds featured in singing bird boxes. This trade caused severe losses to bird populations (for example, egrets and whooping cranes).

Conservationists led campaigns against the use of feathers in hats, contributing to important measures for environmental protection and to changes in fashion. The Royal Society for the Protection of Birds, founded in the United Kingdom in 1889, worked to reduce demand by influencing elite public opinion. In the United States, the Lacey Act of 1900 imposed federal restrictions on the ornamental feather trade, and the 1918 Migratory Bird Treaty Act criminalized possession of the feathers of most native birds. By the second decade of the twentieth century, the ornamental feather market had largely collapsed.

== Evolution ==
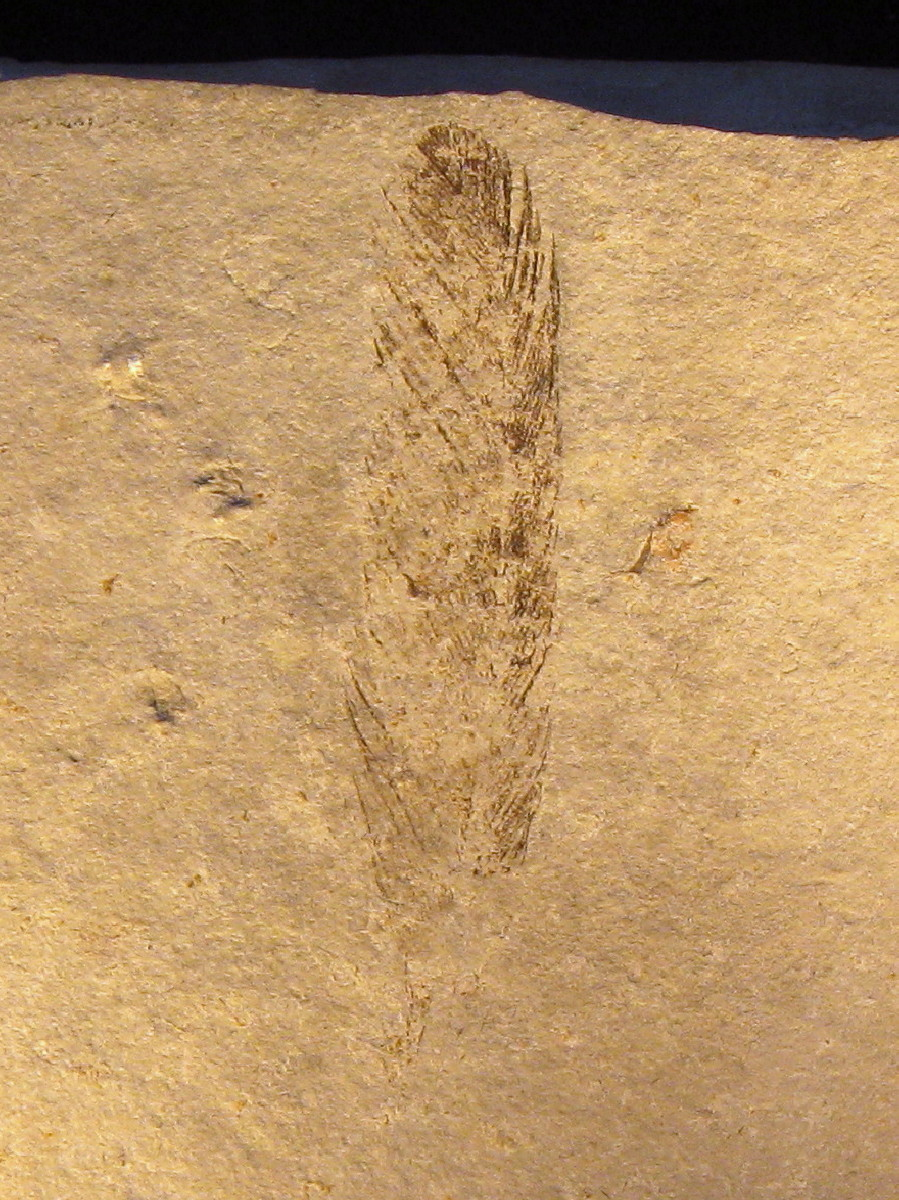
Late Jurassic fossil feather of an unidentified dinosaur, once thought to be Archaeopteryx.

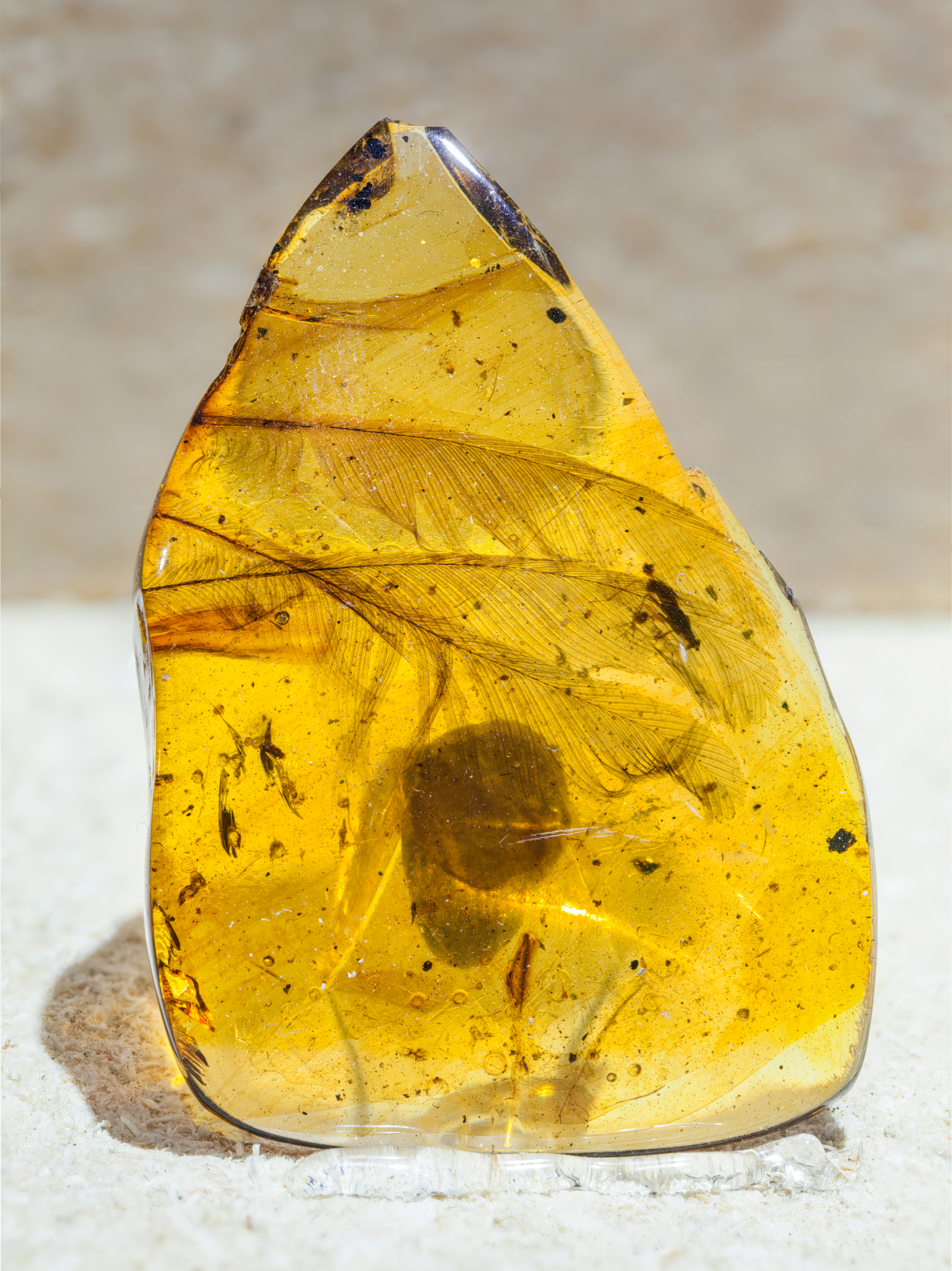
Rachis-dominated feathers inside mid-Cretaceous Burmese amber

=== Functional considerations ===
The functional view on the evolution of feathers has traditionally focused on insulation, flight and display. Discoveries of non-flying Late Cretaceous feathered dinosaurs in China, however, suggest that flight could not have been the original primary function as the feathers simply would not have been capable of providing any form of lift. There have been suggestions that feathers may have had their original function in thermoregulation, waterproofing, or even as sinks for metabolic wastes such as sulphur. Recent discoveries are argued to support a thermoregulatory function, at least in smaller dinosaurs. Some researchers even argue that thermoregulation arose from bristles on the face that were used as tactile sensors. While feathers have been suggested as having evolved from reptilian scales, there are numerous objections to that idea, and more recent explanations have arisen from the paradigm of evolutionary developmental biology. Theories of the scale-based origins of feathers suggest that the planar scale structure was modified for development into feathers by splitting to form the webbing; however, that developmental process involves a tubular structure arising from a follicle and the tube splitting longitudinally to form the webbing. The number of feathers per unit area of skin is higher in smaller birds than in larger birds, and this trend points to their important role in thermal insulation, since smaller birds lose more heat due to the relatively larger surface area in proportion to their body weight. The miniaturization of birds also played a role in the evolution of powered flight. The coloration of feathers is believed to have evolved primarily in response to sexual selection. In fossil specimens of the paravian Anchiornis huxleyi and the pterosaur Tupandactylus imperator, the features are so well preserved that the melanosome (pigment cells) structure can be observed. By comparing the shape of the fossil melanosomes to melanosomes from extant birds, the color and pattern of the feathers on Anchiornis and Tupandactylus could be determined. Anchiornis was found to have black-and-white-patterned feathers on the forelimbs and hindlimbs, with a reddish-brown crest. This pattern is similar to the coloration of many extant bird species, which use plumage coloration for display and communication, including sexual selection and camouflage. It is likely that non-avian dinosaur species utilized plumage patterns for similar functions as modern birds before the origin of flight. In many cases, the physiological condition of the birds (especially males) is indicated by the quality of their feathers, and this is used (by the females) in mate choice. Additionally, when comparing different Ornithomimus edmontonicus specimens, older individuals were found to have a pennibrachium (a wing-like structure consisting of elongate feathers), while younger ones did not. This suggests that the pennibrachium was a secondary sex characteristic and likely had a sexual function.

=== Molecular evolution ===
Several genes have been found to determine feather development. They will be key to understand the evolution of feathers. For instance, some genes convert scales into feathers or feather-like structures when expressed or induced in bird feet, such as the scale-feather converters Sox2, Zic1, Grem1, Spry2, and Sox18.

Feathers and scales are made up of two distinct forms of keratin, and it was long thought that each type of keratin was exclusive to each skin structure (feathers and scales). However, feather keratin is also present in the early stages of development of American alligator scales. This type of keratin, previously thought to be specific to feathers, is suppressed during embryological development of the alligator and so is not present in the scales of mature alligators. The presence of this homologous keratin in both birds and crocodilians indicates that it was inherited from a common ancestor.

This may suggest that crocodilian scales, bird and other dinosaur feathers, and pterosaur pycnofibres are all developmental expressions of the same primitive archosaur skin structures; suggesting that feathers and pycnofibers could be homologous. Molecular dating methods in 2011 show that the subfamily of feather β-keratins found in extant birds started to diverge 143 million years ago, suggesting the pennaceous feathers of Anchiornis were not made of the feather β-keratins present in extant birds. However, a study of fossil feathers from the dinosaur Sinosauropteryx and other fossils revealed traces of beta-sheet proteins, using infrared spectroscopy and sulfur-X-ray spectroscopy. The presence of abundant alpha-proteins in some fossil feathers was shown to be an artefact of the fossilization process, as beta-protein structures are readily altered to alpha-helices during thermal degradation. In 2019, scientists found that genes for the production of feathers evolved at the base of archosauria, supporting that feathers were present at early ornithodirans and is consistent with the fossil record.

=== Feathered dinosaurs ===
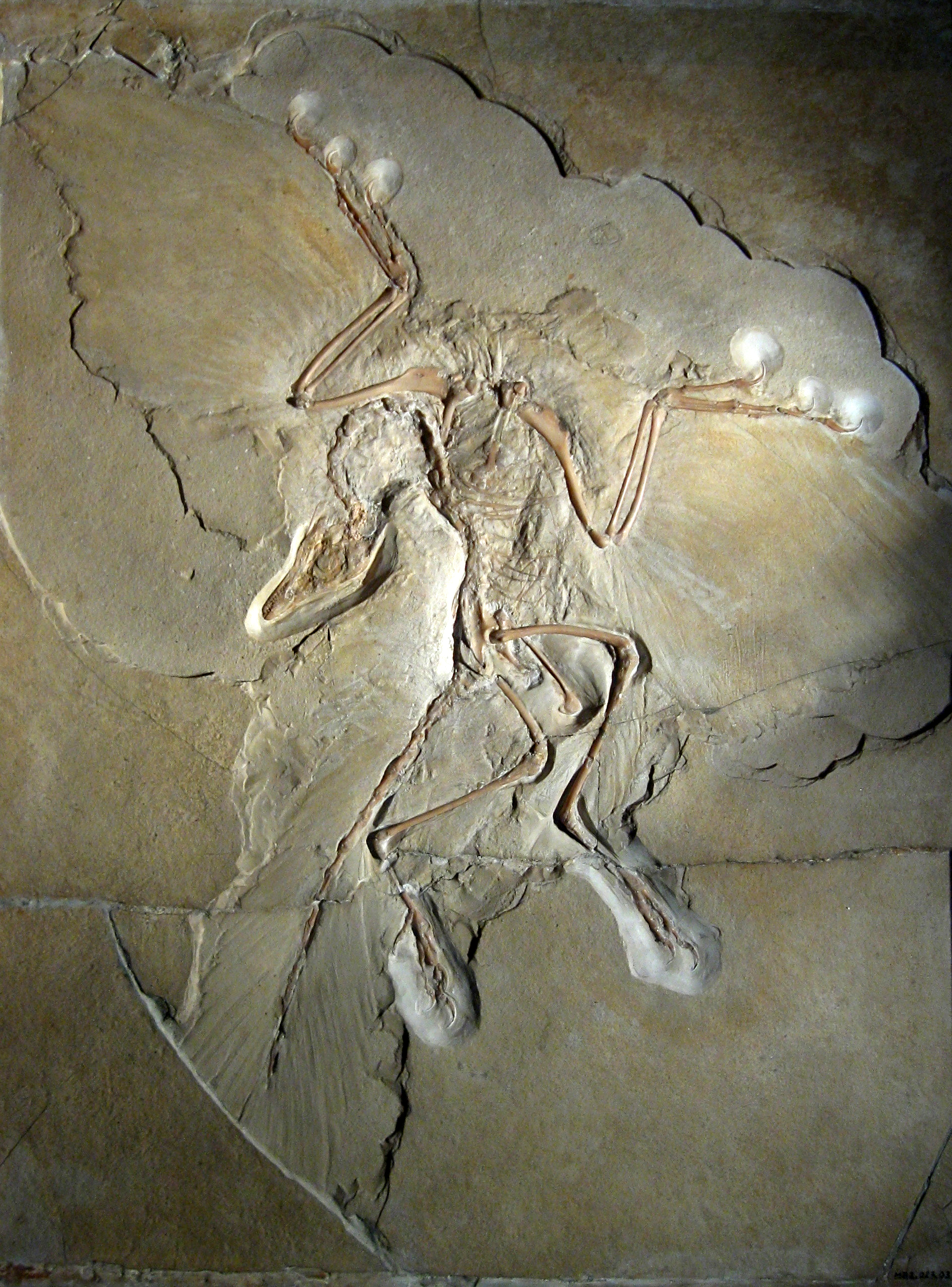
Archaeopteryx lithographica (Berlin specimen)

Several non-avian dinosaurs had feathers on their limbs that would not have functioned for flight. One theory suggests that feathers originally evolved on dinosaurs due to their insulation properties; then, small dinosaur species which grew longer feathers may have found them helpful in gliding, leading to the evolution of proto-birds like Archaeopteryx and Microraptor zhaoianus. Another theory posits that the original adaptive advantage of early feathers was their pigmentation or iridescence, contributing to sexual preference in mate selection. Dinosaurs that had feathers or protofeathers include Pedopenna daohugouensis and Dilong paradoxus, a tyrannosauroid which is 60 to 70 million years older than Tyrannosaurus rex.

The majority of dinosaurs known to have had feathers or protofeathers are theropods, however featherlike "filamentous integumentary structures" are also known from the ornithischian dinosaurs Tianyulong and Psittacosaurus. The exact nature of these structures is still under study. However, it is believed that the stage-1 feathers (see Evolutionary stages section below) such as those seen in these two ornithischians likely functioned in display. In 2014, the ornithischian Kulindadromeus was reported as having structures resembling stage-3 feathers. The likelihood of scales evolving on early dinosaur ancestors are high. However, this was by assuming that primitive pterosaurs were scaly. A 2016 study analyzes the pulp morphology of the tail bristles of Psittacosaurus and finds they are similar to feathers but notes that they are also similar to the bristles on the head of the Congo peafowl, the beard of the turkey, and the spine on the head of the horned screamer. A reestimation of maximum likelihoods by paleontologist Thomas Holtz finds that filaments were more likely to be the ancestral state of dinosaurs.

In 2010, a carcharodontosaurid named Concavenator corcovatus was found to have remiges on the ulna suggesting it might have had quill-like structures on the arms. However, Foth et al. 2014 disagrees with the publication where they point out that the bumps on the ulna of Concavenator are on the anterolateral which is unlike remiges which are in a posterolateral on the ulna of some birds, they consider it more likely that these are attachments for interosseous ligaments. This was refuted by Cuesta Fidalgo and her colleagues, they pointed out that these bumps on the ulna are posterolateral which is unlike that of interosseous ligaments.

Since the 1990s, dozens of feathered dinosaurs have been discovered in the clade Maniraptora, which includes the clade Avialae and the recent common ancestors of birds, Oviraptorosauria and Deinonychosauria. In 1998, the discovery of a feathered oviraptorosaurian, Caudipteryx zoui, challenged the notion of feathers as a structure exclusive to Avialae. Buried in the Yixian Formation in Liaoning, China, C. zoui lived during the Early Cretaceous Period. Present on the forelimbs and tails, their integumentary structure has been accepted as pennaceous vaned feathers based on the rachis and herringbone pattern of the barbs. In the clade Deinonychosauria, the continued divergence of feathers is also apparent in the families Troodontidae and Dromaeosauridae. Branched feathers with rachis, barbs, and barbules were discovered in many members including Sinornithosaurus millenii, a dromaeosaurid found in the Yixian formation (124.6 MYA).

Previously, a temporal paradox existed in the evolution of feathers—theropods with highly derived bird-like characteristics occurred at a later time than Archaeopteryx—suggesting that the descendants of birds arose before the ancestor. However, the discovery of Anchiornis huxleyi in the Late Jurassic Tiaojishan Formation (160 MYA) in western Liaoning in 2009 resolved this paradox. By predating Archaeopteryx, Anchiornis proves the existence of a modernly feathered theropod ancestor, providing insight into the dinosaur-bird transition. The specimen shows distribution of large pennaceous feathers on the forelimbs and tail, implying that pennaceous feathers spread to the rest of the body at an earlier stage in theropod evolution. The development of pennaceous feathers did not replace earlier filamentous feathers. Filamentous feathers are preserved alongside modern-looking flight feathers – including some with modifications found in the feathers of extant diving birds – in 80 million year old amber from Alberta.

Two small wings trapped in amber dating to 100 mya show plumage existed in some bird predecessors. The wings most probably belonged to enantiornithes, a diverse group of avian dinosaurs.

A large phylogenetic analysis of early dinosaurs by Matthew Baron, David B. Norman and Paul Barrett (2017) found that Theropoda is actually more closely related to Ornithischia, to which it formed the sister group within the clade Ornithoscelida. The study also suggested that if the feather-like structures of theropods and ornithischians are of common evolutionary origin then it would be possible that feathers were restricted to Ornithoscelida. If so, then the origin of feathers would have likely occurred as early as the Middle Triassic, though this has been disagreed upon. The lack of feathers present in large sauropods and ankylosaurs could be that feathers were suppressed by genomic regulators.

=== Evolutionary stages ===
Diagram illustrating stages of evolution

Several studies of feather development in the embryos of modern birds, coupled with the distribution of feather types among various prehistoric bird precursors, have allowed scientists to attempt a reconstruction of the sequence in which feathers first evolved and developed into the types found on modern birds.

Feather evolution was broken down into the following stages by Xu and Guo in 2009:

1. Single filament
2. Multiple filaments joined at their base
3. Multiple filaments joined at their base to a central filament
4. Multiple filaments along the length of a central filament
5. Multiple filaments arising from the edge of a membranous structure
6. Pennaceous feather with vane of barbs and barbules and central rachis
7. Pennaceous feather with an asymmetrical rachis
8. Undifferentiated vane with central rachis

However, Foth (2011) showed that some of these purported stages (stages 2 and 5 in particular) are likely simply artifacts of preservation caused by the way fossil feathers are crushed and the feather remains or imprints are preserved. Foth re-interpreted stage 2 feathers as crushed or misidentified feathers of at least stage 3, and stage 5 feathers as crushed stage 6 feathers.

The following simplified diagram of dinosaur relationships follows these results, and shows the likely distribution of plumaceous (downy) and pennaceous (vaned) feathers among dinosaurs and prehistoric birds. The diagram follows one presented by Xu and Guo (2009) modified with the findings of Foth (2011). The numbers accompanying each name refer to the presence of specific feather stages. Note that 's' indicates the known presence of scales on the body.

- Dinosauria
  - Ornithischia
    - Heterodontosauridae (1)
    - - Thyreophora (s)
      - - Kulindadromeus (s, 1, 3)
        - - Ornithopoda (s)
          - - Psittacosauridae (s, 1)
            - Ceratopsidae (s)
  - Saurischia
    - Sauropodomorpha (s)
    - - - Aucasaurus (s)
        - Carnotaurus (s)
        - Ceratosaurus (s)
      - Coelurosauria
        - - Dilong (3?)
          - Other tyrannosauroids (s, 1)
        - - - Juravenator (s, 3?)
            - Sinosauropteryx (3+)
          - Maniraptora
            - Therizinosauria (1, 3+)
            - - Alvarezsauridae (3?)
              - - Oviraptorosauria (4, 6)
                - Paraves
                  - - Troodontidae (3+, 6)
                    - - Other dromaeosaurids
                      - - Sinornithosaurus (3+, 6)
                        - Microraptor (3+, 6, 7)
                  - - Scansoriopterygidae (3+, 6, 8)
                    - - Archaeopterygidae (3+, 6, 7)
                      - - Jeholornis (6, 7)
                        - - Confuciusornis (4, 6, 7, 8)
                          - - Enantiornithes (4, 6, 7, 8)
                            - Neornithes (4, 6, 7, 8)

=== In pterosaurs ===
Pterosaurs were long known to have filamentous fur-like structures covering their body known as pycnofibres, which were generally considered distinct from the "true feathers" of birds and their dinosaur kin. However, a 2018 study of two small, well-preserved pterosaur fossils from the Jurassic of Inner Mongolia, China indicated that pterosaurs were covered in an array of differently-structured pycnofibres (rather than just filamentous ones), with several of these structures displaying diagnostic features of feathers, such as non-veined grouped filaments and bilaterally branched filaments, both of which were originally thought to be exclusive to birds and other maniraptoran dinosaurs. Given these findings, it is possible that feathers have deep evolutionary origins in ancestral archosaurs, though there is also a possibility that these structures independently evolved to resemble bird feathers via convergent evolution. Mike Benton, the study's senior author, lent credence to the former theory, stating "We couldn't find any anatomical evidence that the four pycnofiber types are in any way different from the feathers of birds and dinosaurs. Therefore, because they are the same, they must share an evolutionary origin, and that was about 250 million years ago, long before the origin of birds." But the integumentary structures of the anurognathid specimens is still based gross morphology as Liliana D'Alba pointed out. The pycnofibres of the two anurognathid specimens might not be homologous with the filamentous appendages on dinosaurs. Paul M. Barrett suspects that during the integumentary evolution of pterosaurs, pterosaurs primitively lost scales and pycnofibers started to appear.

Cascocauda was almost entirely covered in an extensive coat of pycnofibres, which appear to have come in two types. The first are simple, curved filaments that range in length from 3.5–12.8 mm long. These filaments cover most of the animal, including the head, neck, body, limbs and tail. The second type consists of tufts of filaments joined near the base, similar to the branching down feathers of birds and other coelurosaurian dinosaurs, around 2.5–8.0 mm long and only cover the wing membranes. Studies of sampled pycnofibres revealed the presence of microbodies within the filaments, resembling the melanosome pigments identified in other fossil integuments, specifically phaeomelanosomes. Furthermore, infrared spectral analysis of these pycnofibres show similar absorption spectra to red human hair. These pycnofibres likely provided both insulation and may have helped streamline the body and wings during flight. The identity of these branching structures as pycnofibres or feathers was challenged by Unwin & Martill (2020), who interpreted them as bunched-up and degraded aktinofibrils–stiffening fibres found in the wing membrane of pterosaurs–and attributed the melanosomes and keratin to skin rather than filaments. These claims were refuted by Yang and colleagues, who argue that Unwin and Martill's interpretations are inconsistent with the specimen's preservation. Namely, they argue that the consistent structure, regular spacing, and extension of the filaments beyond the wing membrane support their identification as pycnofibres. Further, they argue that the restriction of melanosomes and keratin to the fibres, as occurs in fossil dinosaur feathers, supports the case they are filaments and is not consistent with contamination from preserved skin. Protofeathers likely evolved in early archosaurs, not long after the P-T extinction event during the time metabolic rates of early archosaurs and synapsids were increasing, postures becoming erect, and sustained activity.

== See also ==
- Feather development
- Delayed feathering in chickens
- Hen feathering in cocks
- Imping
- List of poultry feathers
- Pinioning
- Plumage
- White feather
