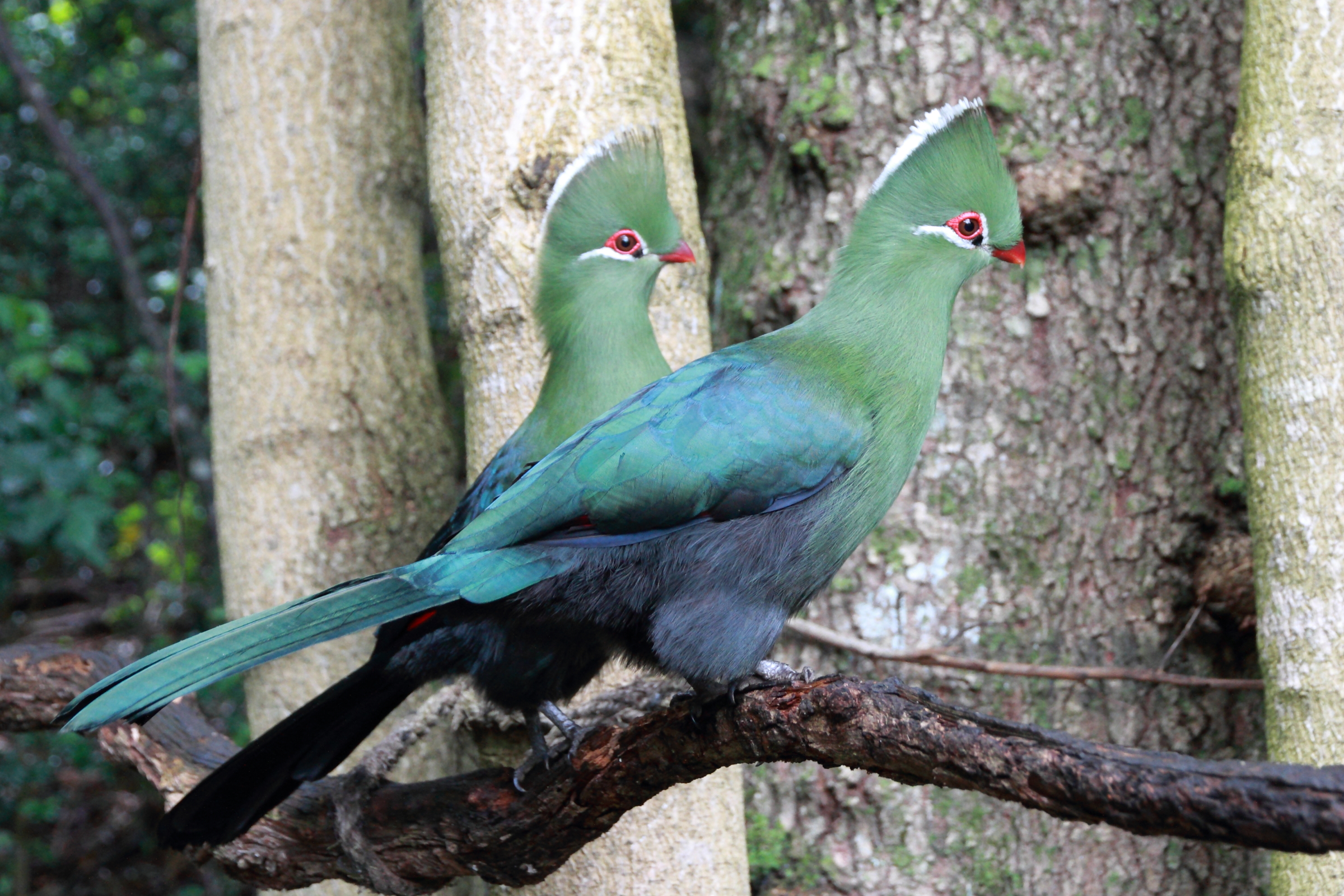
- Pair

Conservation status
- Least Concern (IUCN 3.1)

Scientific classification
- Kingdom: Animalia
- Phylum: Chordata
- Class: Aves
- Order: Musophagiformes
- Family: Musophagidae
- Genus: Tauraco
- Species: T. corythaix

Binomial name
- Tauraco corythaix (Wagler, 1827)
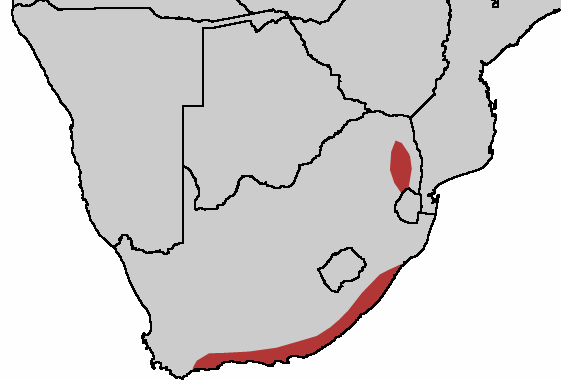
- Range of the Knysna turaco: subspp. corythaix (south) and phoebus (north)

= Knysna turaco =

Species of bird

The Knysna turaco (Tauraco corythaix), or, in South Africa, Knysna loerie, is a large turaco, one of a group of African musophagidae birds. It is a resident breeder in the mature evergreen forests of southern and eastern South Africa, and Eswatini. It was formerly sometimes considered to be a subspecies of the green turaco of West Africa. The Livingstone's and Schalow's turacos were once considered subspecies.

This species lays two eggs in a shallow platform nest made from sticks and placed in a tree or clump of creepers.

Within its range, this is an unmistakable bird, although often inconspicuous in the treetops. It is 40–42 cm long, including a long tail. The small but thick orange-red bill and a white line just under the eye contrast with the mainly green plumage. It has a tall green crest, which is tipped with white. The eye is brown and the eye-ring deep red. In flight, Knysna turaco shows conspicuous crimson primary flight feathers. Sexes are similar, but juvenile birds have a shorter crest without the white tips.

The Knysna turaco is usually seen flying between forest trees, or hopping along branches. It feeds on fruit, insects and earthworms. It has a loud kow-kow-kow-kow call.

This bird family is known as Loeries in South Africa, but the international name is Turaco. Turacos (the 10 species of the Tauraco and the 2 of the Musophaga) are the only birds to possess true red and green colour. The color human eyes see in most birds' plumage is a reflection produced by the feather structure. The turaco's red pigment (turacin) and green pigment (turacoverdin) both contain copper. In fact, a glass of water, if stirred with a red turaco feather, will turn pink. In museum species, the pigments deepen with age because the copper begins to oxidize. These birds maintain their colours throughout the year. The Knysna Loerie is thought to use its red wing feathers to escape predators. Indeed, when it flies, the predators tend to focus on the most visible colour and follow the red patch. As the Loerie lands and folds its wings, the red feathers of the wings become invisible and the Loerie has a chance of escaping unseen.

== Images ==
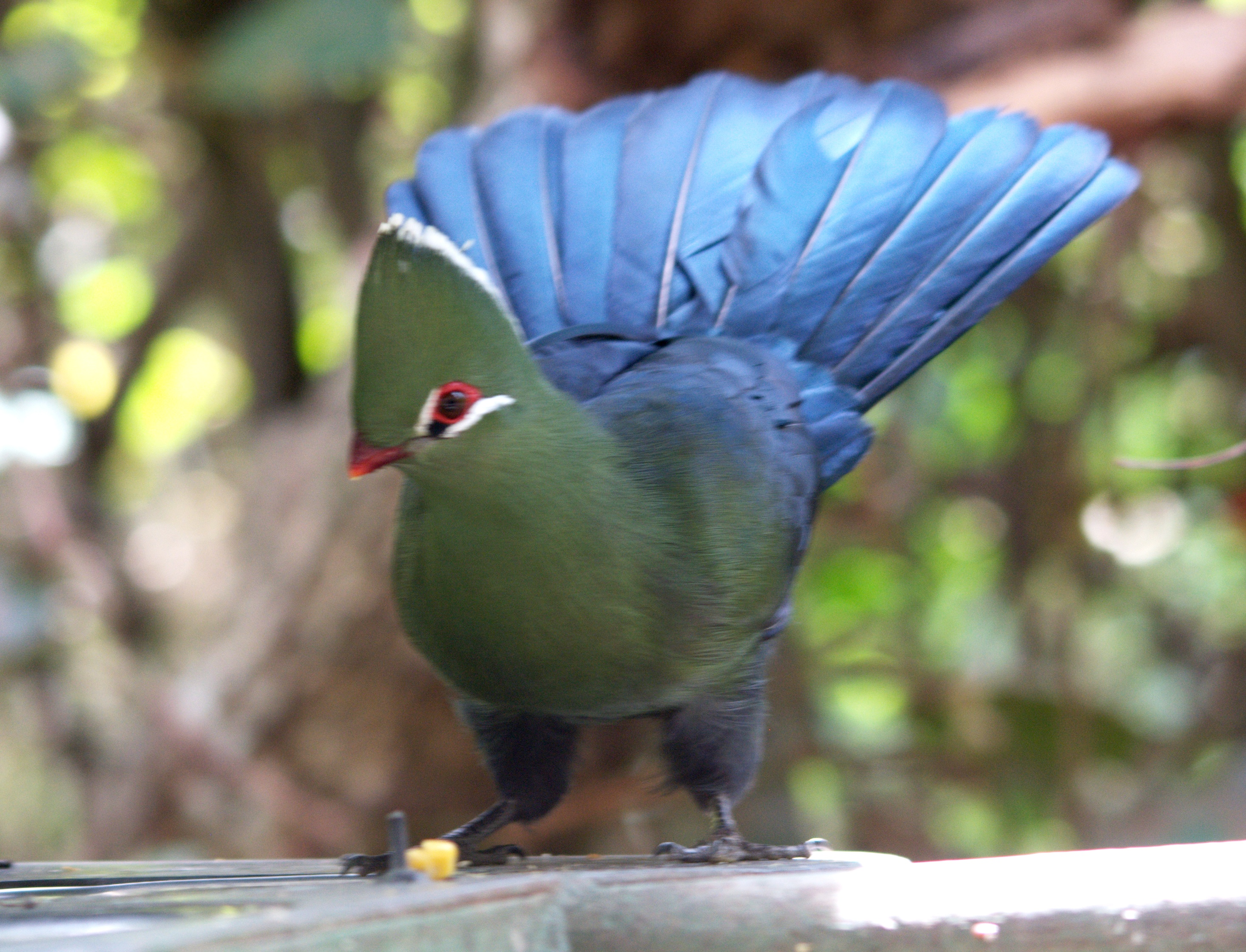
At Birds of Eden, in the Eastern Cape

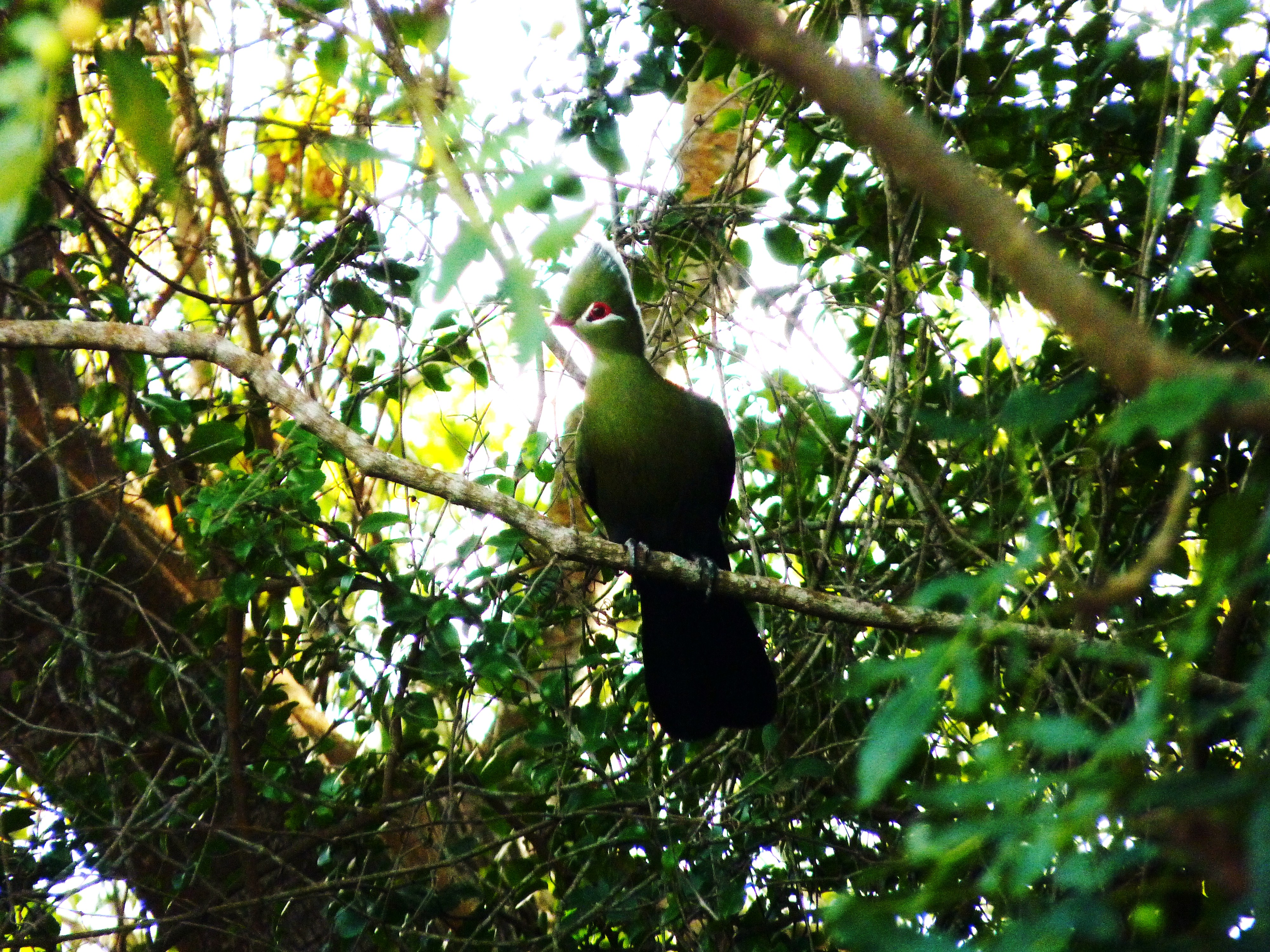
At Knysna, in the Western Cape

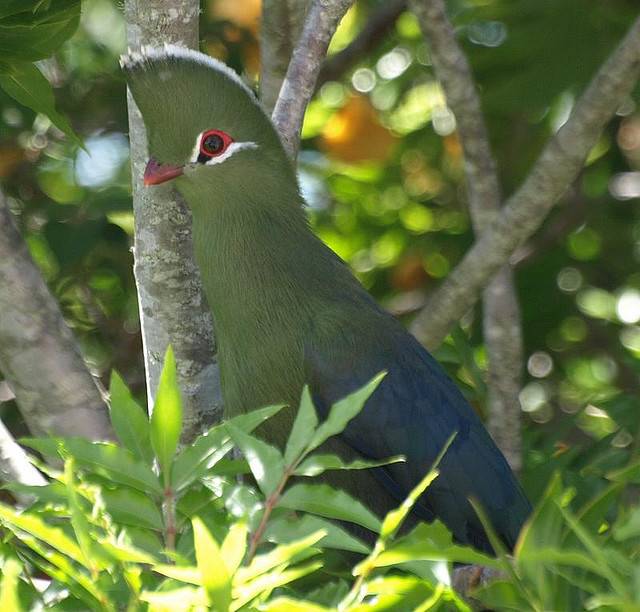
The vivid plumage is still an effective camouflage in its native habitat

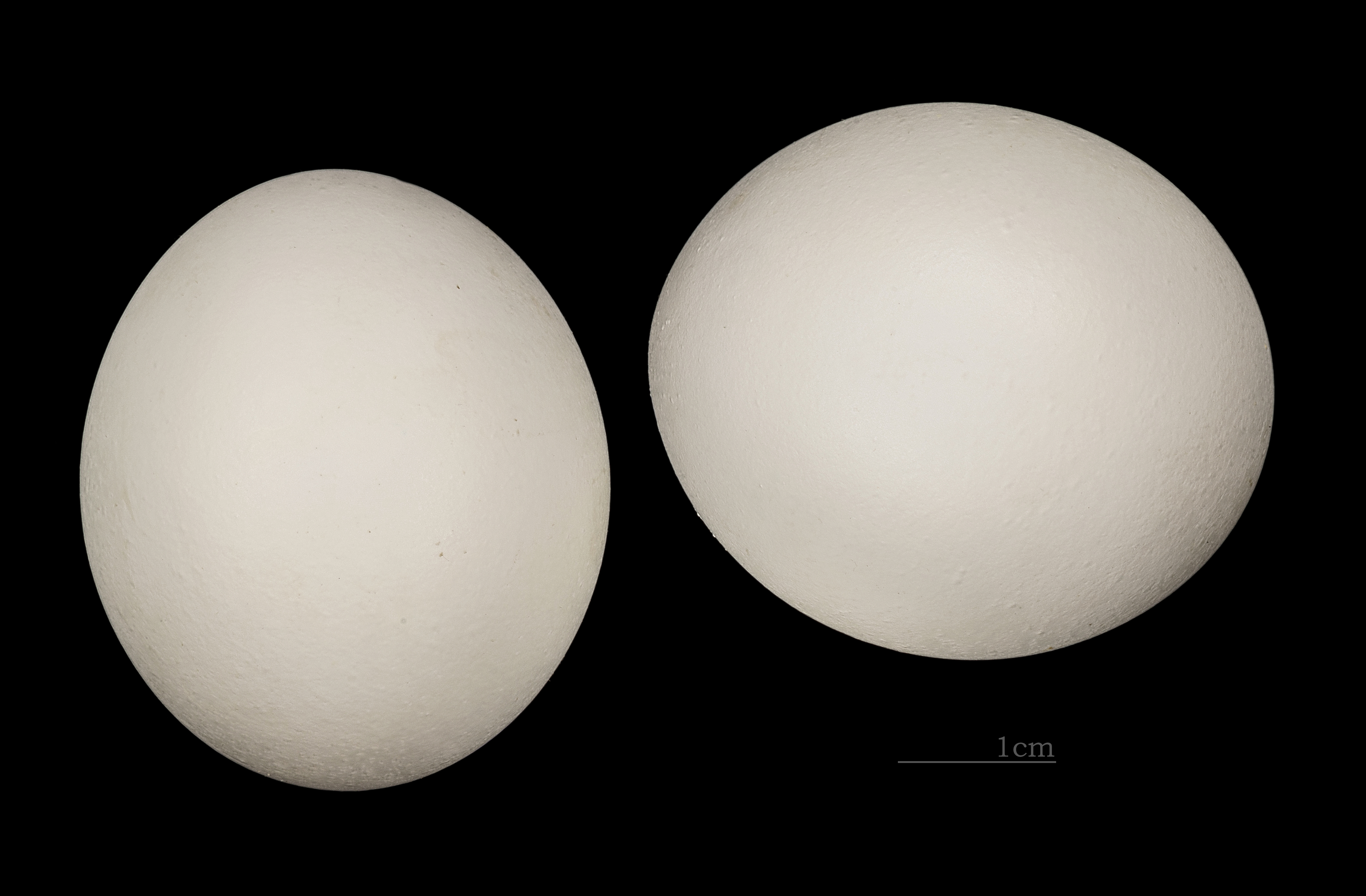
Eggs of Tauraco corythaix MHNT
