= Turacoverdin =

Bright green pigment in birds

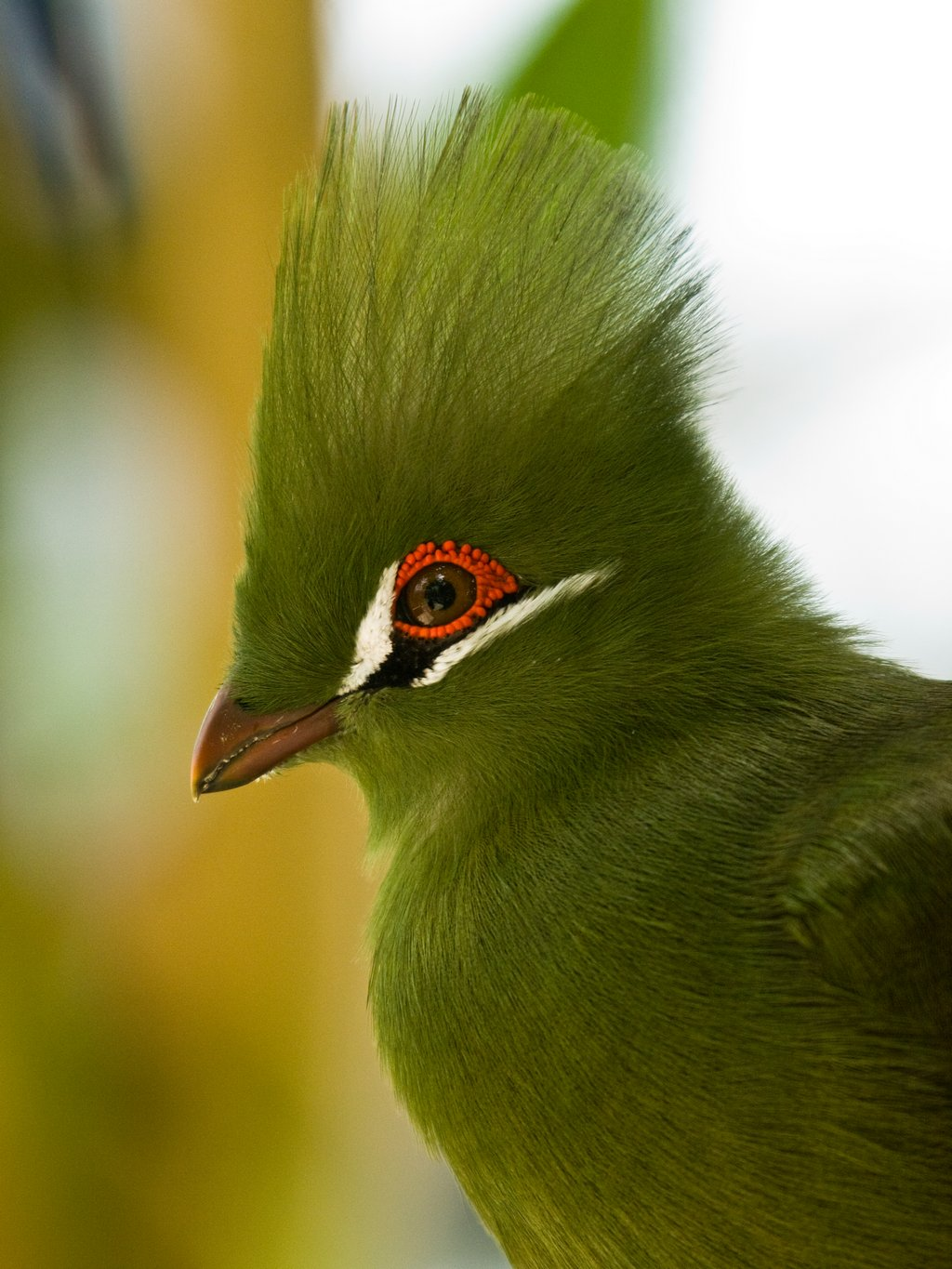
The Guinea turaco's green coloration is due to the pigment turacoverdin

Turacoverdin is a unique copper uroporphyrin pigment responsible for the bright green coloration of several birds of the family Musophagidae, most notably the turaco. It is chemically related to turacin, a red pigment also found almost exclusively in turacos. Turacoverdin is one of the only true green pigments found in birds, as the coloration that appears in most green feathers is due to the unique properties of blue structural coloration in combination with yellow carotenoids. Turacoverdin and turacin were the first ever chemically characterized feather pigments, and turacoverdin was first isolated and described in 1882 by Dr. C.F.W. Krukenberg.

== Chemical properties ==
Few studies into the chemical nature of turacoverdin have been performed to date. Research by R.E. Moreau in the 1950s showed it to be less soluble in basic solutions than its chemical cousin turacin. While originally thought to contain little copper by its discoverer, who instead believed it to be iron-based, later spectroscopic analysis demonstrated high copper (and low iron) content in pigment from the green feathers of the Knysna turaco and the Schalow's turaco. Moreau also demonstrated that the green coloration of turacos might actually be due to the combined effect of two different turacoverdin pigments that differ slightly in polarity.

When extracted and exposed to light, oxygen, or strong bases, turacin has been shown to take on a green hue. This has caused several researchers to suggest that turacoverdin may be an oxidized metabolite of turacin. This has been supported by data comparing the absorption bands of the "altered turacin" with those of turacoverdin, which are shown to be very similar to one another. Several researchers have noted the chemical similarities between turacin and turacoverdin. This relationship has been supported by spectral properties, the fact that both pigments contain copper, their similar microscopic arrangement in feather cells, and the co-occurrence of the pigments: turacin and turacoverdin are always found together in the same species, and in many cases are also found in the same plumage locations. The green appearance of turacoverdin can be derived from its absorbance curve, which peaks at blue wavelengths and in the long-wave range above yellow. Turacoverdin shows little UV reflectance.

== Phylogenetic evidence ==
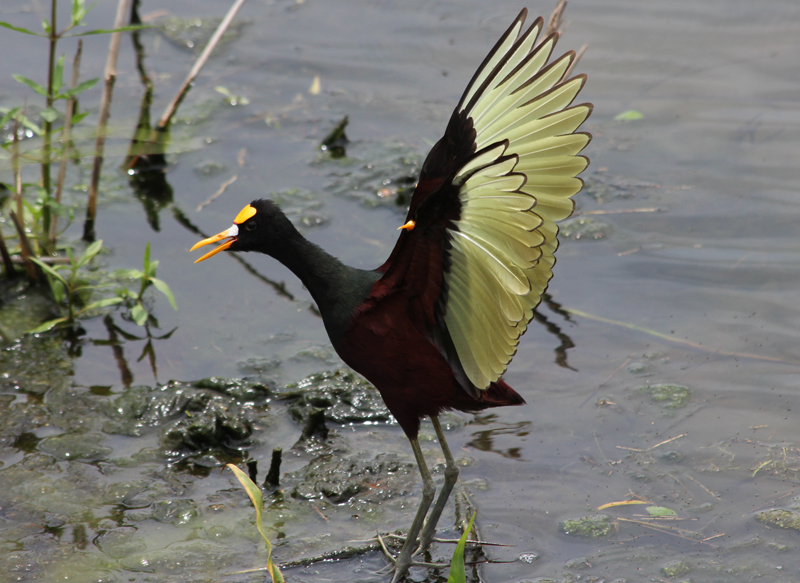
The green in the wings of the northern jacana may be due to turacoverdin

Turacin and turacoverdin are both found in four of the six genera of turacos. The subfamily Criniferinae is typically regarded as being devoid of the brighter pigments, although the genus Corythaeola does have a small stripe of turacoverdin on its breast. The remaining turaco genera are placed in the subfamily Musophaginae and are referred to as the turacin-bearing turacos. More than half of turaco species belong to the genus Tauraco, and are all notable for being mostly a vivid green.

Recent spectrophotometric evidence suggests that turacoverdin may be closely related or identical to green pigments in the feathers of the northern jacana (Jacana spinosa), the blood pheasant (Ithaginis cruentus), and the crested wood-partridge (Rollulus rouloul). As Ithaginis and Rollulus are members of the order Galliformes, this has led some researchers to assume support for a turacoverdin-bearing common ancestor of Musophagidae and Galliformes, making the presence of the pigment a symplesiomorphy for these groups. The pigment data specifically suggests that turacos evolved from a group of galliform species, which is represented by the extant genera Ithaginis and Rollolus. Based on the appearance of its green feathers, researcher Jan Dyck speculates that Rollolus is closer to a possible ancestor than Ithaginis.

The northern jacana, on the other hand, is a member of the order Charadriiformes, a group clearly not closely related to either Musophagidae or Galliformes. This makes it highly unlikely that turacoverdin in Jacana reflects common ancestry with either turacos or galliforms. If the green pigment in Jacana is truly turacoverdin, then the pigment must have evolved independently in this order. This is further supported by the fact that the pigment in Jacana is located only in the remiges, while in all musophagid and galliform species, the pigment is found mainly in body feathers.

== Biological significance ==
Turacin and turacoverdin, being copper-based pigments, require large quantities of copper in order to be manufactured. As turacos are primarily arboreal species, they are able to accumulate copper through a diet rich in fruits, flowers, buds, and other plant matter. Church and Moreau estimated that 3 months' worth of fruit intake contribute to producing the pigment present in the newly grown plumage of the turaco species T. corythaix (the Knysna turaco). It has also been observed that it takes young turacos around a year to acquire their colorful adult plumage, and some authors have speculated that they probably need that long to acquire the necessary copper. It has also been noted that turacos all live across Central Africa, which corresponds geographically with one of the world's richest copperbelts. It is unknown whether turaco diets are especially rich in copper as compared to the diets of other birds, or whether turacos are especially effective at extracting copper from their foods. It is also unknown whether turaco species lacking turacin and turacoverdin-induced pigmentation have a comparatively copper-deficient diet, absorb less copper from their diet, or lack the enzymes required to synthesize the pigments.

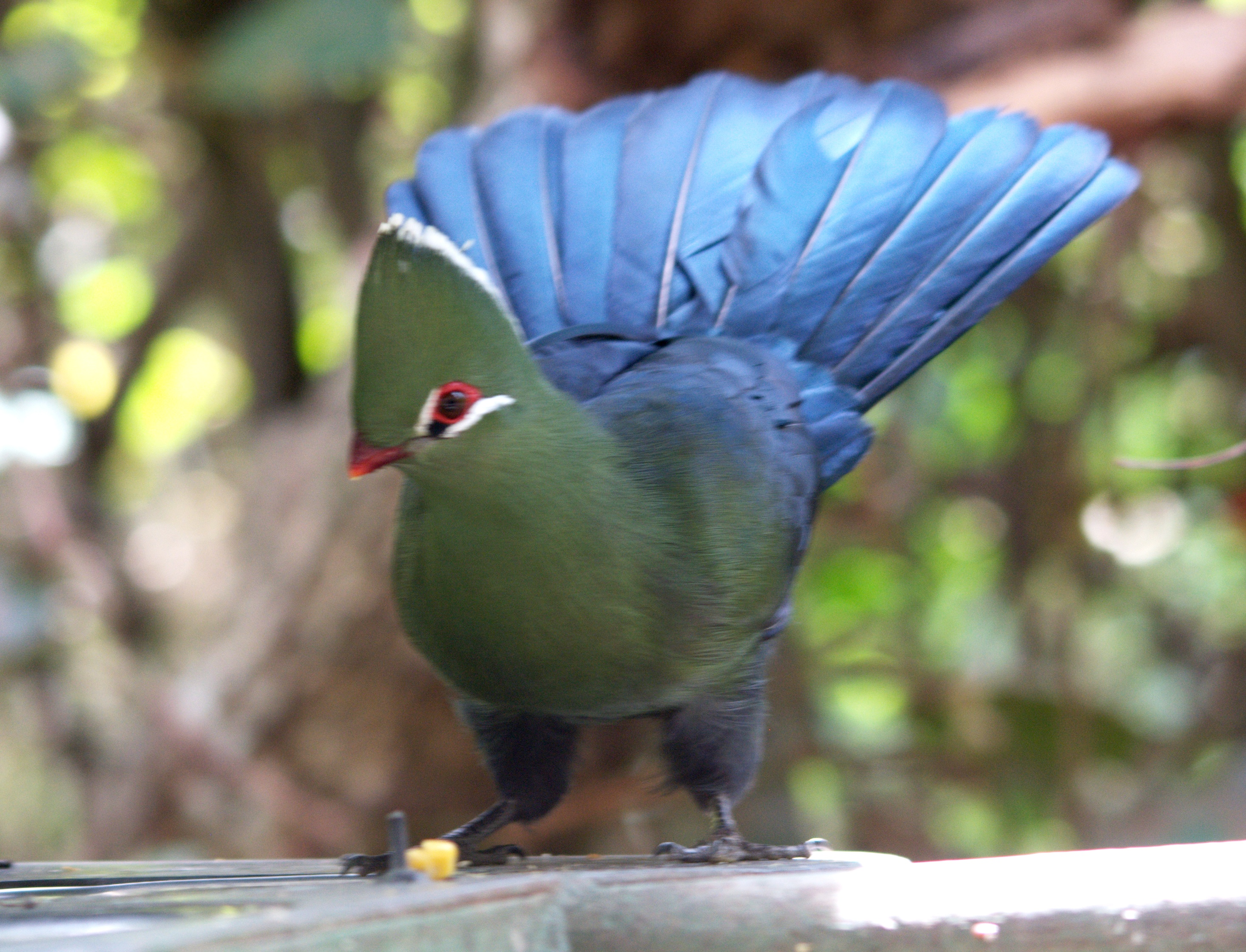
A Knysna turaco displaying its bright colors

Although no formal tests have been performed investigating the functional significance of turacoverdin coloration, speculation abounds. Moreau in 1958 observed that turaco species inhabiting forests are more likely to be green in color than species inhabiting other environments, which may offer concealment from predators. In fact, it has been observed that the greener and denser a turaco's forest habitat, the deeper green its plumage, while non-forest-dwelling turaco species tend to be devoid of the green pigment. This claim has not been studied rigorously from a biochemical or phylogenetic perspective, however, and awaits further research. Turacos may employ their unique green coloration for sexual or social advertisement, but again no spectrophotometric or biochemical studies have been conducted to test for sex differences in coloration, and to limited human perception there appears to be none.

Other authors speculate that turacos and other birds employing the use of turacoverdin may derive a physiological and biochemical benefit from synthesizing the pigment. Copper, like porphyrins, can be damaging to birds when accumulated at high concentrations. Turacos may detoxify the high levels of copper ingested in a diet rich with porphyrins, thereby advertising the protection they've granted themselves by depositing the copper-rich pigments in their feathers. It also may be of some biological significance that turacos all seem to be pigmented with turacin and turacoverdin in exactly the same regions of the wing feathers.

== See also ==
- Turacin, a red poryphrin pigment found almost exclusively in turacos
- Psittacofulvin, a brightly colored pigment unique to parrots
- Melanin, a class of pigments responsible for a large range of coloration in many animal groups, and includes:
  - Phaeomelanin, a melanin pigment responsible for many russet, brown and tan hues in feathers
  - Eumelanin, a melanin pigment responsible for the deep black common to flight feathers
- Carotenoids, a class of pigments responsible for many of the yellow, orange and red hues found in birds, and includes:
  - Astaxanthin, a red carotenoid pigment
  - Rhodoxanthin, a purple-red carotenoid pigment
  - Canthaxanthin, an orange-red carotenoid pigment
  - Lutein, a bright yellow carotenoid pigment
- Biliverdin, a blue bile pigment responsible for the bright blue eggshells of some birds
