= Arthur Herbert Church =

British chemist (1834–1915)

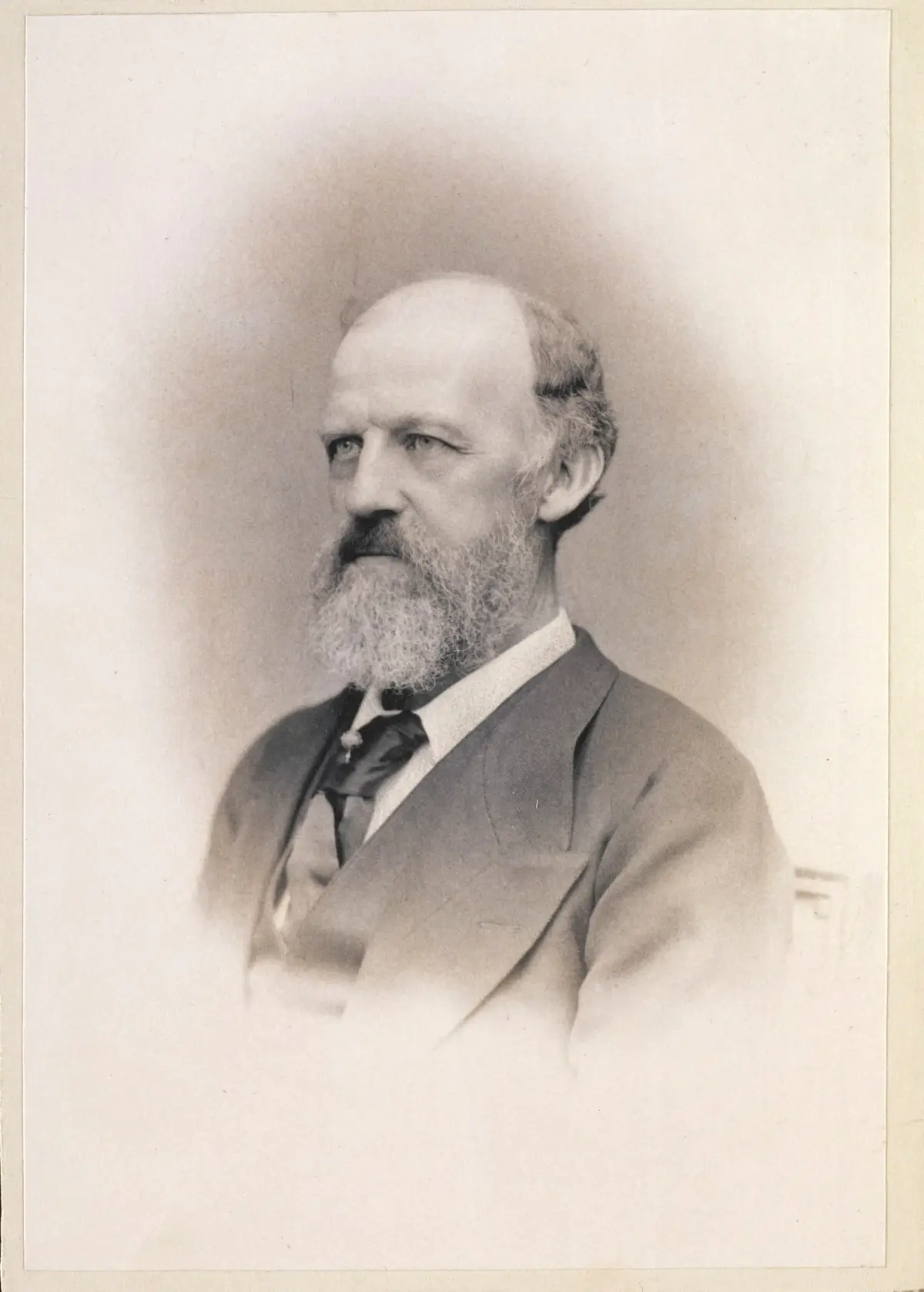
Arthur Herbert Church

Sir Arthur Herbert Church KCVO FCS (2 June 1834 – 31 May 1915) was a British chemist, expert on pottery, stones and chemistry of paintings, who discovered turacin in 1869 and several minerals, including the only British cerium mineral. He was also a talented artist and worked as a professor of chemistry at the Agricultural College in Cirencester and then at the Royal Academy of Arts. He wrote extensively on aspects of chemistry in agriculture, art, and daily life. He wrote a widely used book on paints, "The Chemistry of Paints and Painting".

== Early life ==
Church was born in London, the son of John Thomas Church, a solicitor. His studied at King's College London where he showed an interest in both science and art. He spent four years from 1851 to 1855 at the Royal College of Chemistry where he, under A. W. Hofmann, studied alongside William Henry Perkin with whom he published his first research paper. The next four years were spent at Lincoln College, Oxford, where he received a BA in 1859. He then started a private laboratory in London and beside his chemical analysis work, he started painting landscapes, which were first exhibited in The Royal Academy in May 1854.

== Royal Agricultural College ==
Church worked at the college in Cirencester from 1863 to 1879 as a professor. He also worked as an Honorary Curator at the Cirencester Museum of Roman Antiquities. These associations led to work that included analysis of plants, soil, and minerals, extending into gemstones, porcelain and pigments. He examined the red water-soluble plumage of a West African Tauraco after being introduced to it by W. B. Tegetmeier and found that the pigment had 5.8% copper. He then examined the food of the bird and found that Musa sapientum had copper. He also discovered aluminium in a range of plant ashes. Another discovery was a mineral from Cornwall that contained Cerium phosphate and called as Churchite.

== Royal Academy of Arts ==
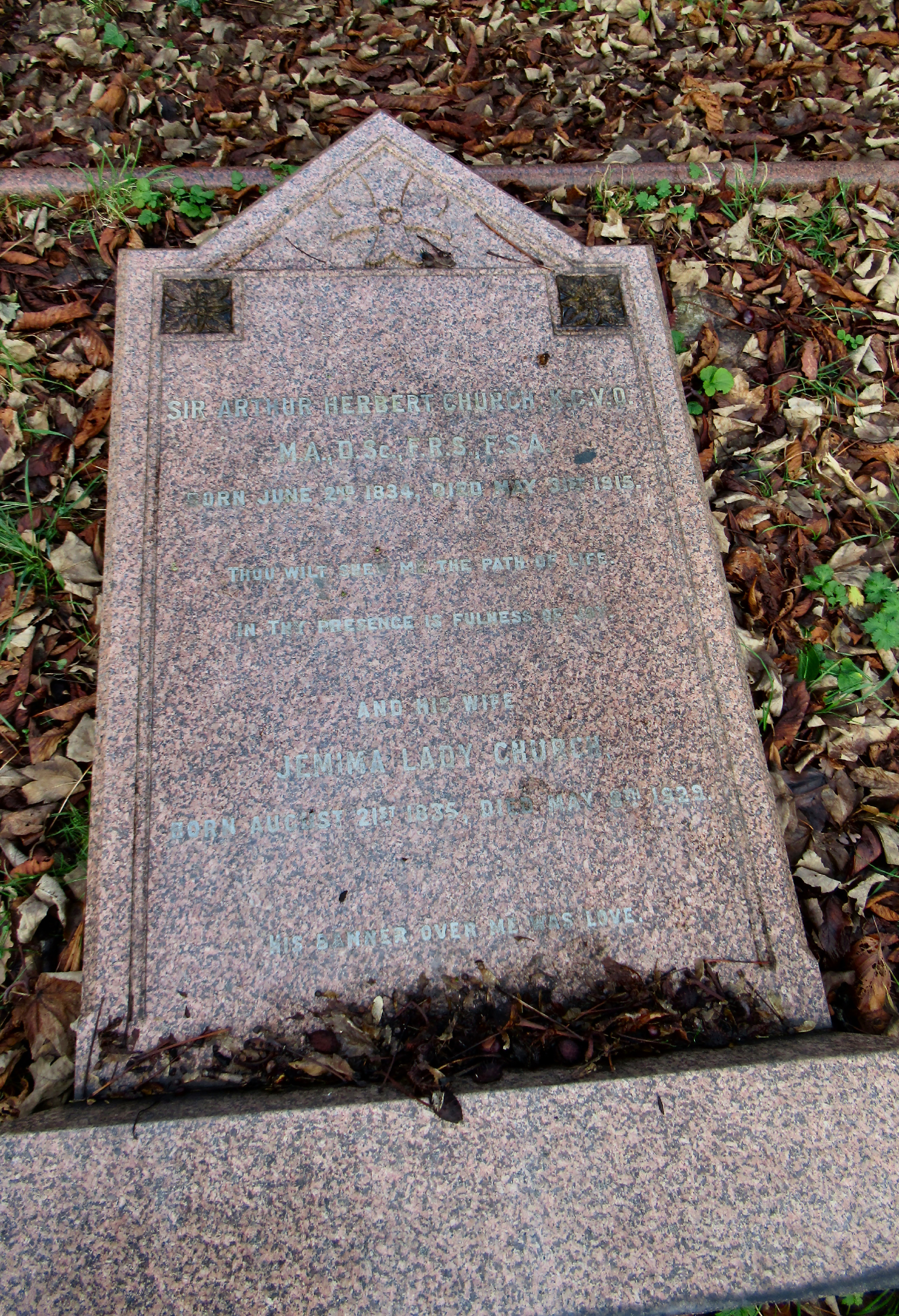
Richmond Cemetery

In 1879, Church became the first professor of chemistry at the Royal Academy of Arts where he took a special interest in pigments, glazes and other matters. He was elected fellow of the Royal Society in 1888. As a painter of repute and an expert on the chemistry of paints, he was chosen for the restoration of paintings and frescoes in the Palace of Westminster.

Church was elected a member of the American Antiquarian Society in 1901. He was invested KCVO in 1909.

== Personal life ==
He died at Shelsley, Kew Gardens in 1915, and is buried in Richmond Cemetery. He had married Jemima, the daughter of Mr. J. B. Pope; she died at Kew in 1929. Shelsley was a detached house at 21 Ennerdale Road, Kew, now demolished.

== Publications ==
Church wrote several books on organic, physiological and mineralogical chemistry.

- Food (1880)
- English porcelain; a handbook to the china made in England during the eighteenth century as illustrated by specimens chiefly in the national collections (1885) (1911 edition)
- Food-grains of India (1886)
- Laboratory Guide for Agricultural Students (1888)
- The Chemistry of Paints and Painting (1890)
- Precious stones : considered in their scientific and artistic relations (1891)
- Josiah Wedgwood, master-potter (1903)
- Colour : an elementary manual for students (1907)
