= Feather development =

Keratin growth process occurring in the epidermal layer of the birds skin

Feather development occurs in the epidermal layer of the skin in birds. It is a complicated process involving many steps. Once the feathers are fully developed, there are six different types of feathers: contour, flight, down, filoplumes, semiplumes, and bristle feathers. Feathers were not originally meant for flight. The exact reason why feathers evolved is still unknown. Birds are thought to be descendants of dinosaurs and new technology using melanosomes found in dinosaur fossils has shown that certain dinosaurs that could not fly had feathers.

== Anatomy of a feather ==
Feathers are products of the epidermis and keratinizing system. They are non-vascular and non-nervous. They have a tubular central shaft called the rachis; coming off either side of the rachis are the veins, which have a series of barbs with interlocking connections that are called barbules. The rachis and attached veins make up the spathe. The opposite of the rachis is the calamus, which anchors the feather to the body and is moved by attached dermal muscles. There are many different types of feathers that mostly follow this basic design with few variations based on evolutionary needs.

== Evolution of feathers ==
Feathers are sometimes referred to as “elaborate reptile scales” just as birds are sometimes viewed as a subset of reptiles instead of their own category. Although this is a simplification, it originates from bird's homology with reptiles. Birds evolved from fast bipedal dinosaurs, but feathers evolved before them, and not for flying as what was originally thought. The theory of feathers evolving for flight unraveled in the 1970s when theropod dinosaurs (some common theropods were Tyrannosaurus rex and Velociraptors) were discovered to have feathers. By looking at melanosomes, which are structures whose shape and arrangement determines how light reflects off of the pigment, in dinosaur fossils, scientists have found that dinosaurs did in fact have bold plumage. Specifically, Jakob Vinter and his colleagues analyzed the melanosomes in Anchiornis huxleyi, which they were able to reconstruct into what the plumage would have looked like 150 million years ago when A. huxleyi lived.

In 1861, a group of German quarry workers found the fossil of Archaeopteryx, which had feathers like modern birds, but also teeth in its mouth, a long, bony wing, and claws on its wings like a reptile. Archaeopteryx seems to be a transitional animal from reptile to bird. However, Archaeopteryx had already rather developed feathers, which didn't help to show how the feathers had evolved in the first place. In 1996, the missing fossil to help show the evolution of feathers was found. Sinosauropteryx was covered in thin, hollow filaments that covered its back and tail. Now, after finding many dinosaurs with primitive feathers, it is believed that feathers started out as these thin, hollow filaments, and eventually evolved into the fluffy coats of feathers seen on modern birds.

There are a few theories for the reasons feathers evolved in the first place, if not for flight. The first is that they served a purpose as insulation. Theropods have been found covering their nests with their forelimbs, thought to be sheltering their young. Feathers known to be found on theropods would have played an important role for insulation. Another popular theory is that quick, bipedal dinosaurs used their feathers to run faster. It's possible that the feathers assisted the dinosaurs running up inclines, and this advantage of speed eventually lead to flight. The arboreal theory suggests that animals that lived in trees found it quicker and more energy efficient to leap from tree to tree instead of running down a tree, across the ground to another tree, and back up the new tree. This leaping eventually lead to gliding, and flight.

Another newer theory is that feathers were meant to aid in sexual selection. Their plumage patterns and bold coloration were to attract the opposite sex, not unlike modern birds today. Using new technology to analyze well-preserved melanosomes, scientists can reconstruct what the feathers on fossilized dinosaurs would have looked like, revealing some to be rather flamboyant.

More recent efforts to explain the original purpose for feathers involve multiple of these theories in combination. Ken Dial, a flight researcher at the University of Montana-Missoula, shows how chicks often use their feathers by flapping their wings to aid in navigating inclined terrain. It is very possible that feathers had multiple useful functions prior to their association with flight.

== Steps of feather development ==
Feathers develop from the dermal papillae. Feathers begin to form from feather follicles, which are invaginations starting in the epidermis down to the dermis. It is in the dermis that the follicle and the pulp cavity begin to form the feather. The pulp cavity is the space that contains the feather follicle. The feather filament soon grows out of the follicle; this is due to cell proliferation, which is an increased number of cells as a result cell growth and division, at the follicle base. These new cells form two different tissues. There is the sheath, which is the main feather tissues and pulp caps. The sheath is the supportive layer that surrounds the feather, which falls off as it grows. Similarly, the pulp caps, which protect the dermal core, also fall off as the feather grows. The main feather tissues later unfurl, which causes the disposal of the sheath and the pulp caps as it assumes its functional shape. As the feather grows, its spathe, which is where the rachis and vanes attach, continues to form. When spathe is finished developing, the calamus begins to form within the base of the spathe. The calamus is the quill of the feather, which is the bottom portion that stays mainly within the pulp cavity. From there, the feather is fully developed and will remain as such until molting occurs, causing it to fall off. Feathers fall off during molting, which occurs at different times through the year depending on the type of bird. Birds can molt for seasonal, reproductive and many other reasons.

== Types of feathers ==
There are six different types of feathers, which are flight, contour, down, semiplumes, filoplumes, and bristle feathers.

=== Pennaceous feathers ===
Pennaceous feathers are relatively stiff and flat; the flight and contour feathers are of this kind. They have stiff barbs branching from the main trunk of the feather (the rachis). These barbs in turn have barbules branching off of them, the barbules have hooklets spaced evenly along their length and hook together to form a stable smooth surface.

Flight feathers can be broken down into wing and tail feathers, remiges and rectrices respectively.

The wing feathers can in turn be broken down into further types (primary, secondary and tertiary). In general, they are long and asymmetrical with a thin leading edge allowing for strong stable feathers during flight. Flight feathers are connected to the bone with ligaments allowing them to be moved with precision and ensuring they remain tightly attached to the bird. The primaries are at the far (wrist) end of the wing and provide forward thrust during takeoff and flight. The secondaries are in the middle of the wing and attach to the ulna and form an airfoil which provides lift. The tertiaries are located closest to the body.

The tail feathers are used to control flight acting as rudder and brake, only some of these feathers are as firmly attached as the bird's primaries.

Contour feathers are arranged on the body of the bird in the manner of roof tiles. The tips of these feathers are waterproof and help protect the bird from the elements, while the inner parts of the feather near the bird's body are more downy. Wing contour feathers (known as coverts) help with the aerodynamics of the wing by covering where the flight feathers attach to the bone.

=== Plumulaceous feathers ===
Plumulaceous feathers, otherwise known as downy feathers, lack barbules and hooklets. Normally, they are fluffy and used for insulation. There are special types of down feathers that, when disintegrated, can form keratin powder, which can be used to waterproof feathers. Birds can use this ability for a variety of reasons, but the main reason is for insulation against cold and/or water, especially for the birds that dive into or sit on water. There are four kinds of these feathers.

Semiplumes are usually not visible as they are hidden by the contour feathers. Their appearance is that of a loose downy, but stiff feather. They consist of a rachis, barbs and barbules, however they do not have hooklets. Their purpose is insulation and aerodynamics. Down is similar to semiplume, however they have a very short or missing rachis.

Filoplumes are thin, hair-like feathers with a long rachis and very few barbs near the tip. They are located next to other feathers and, while their function is not fully understood, they are thought to serve a sensory function allowing the bird to react to the positioning of its contour and flight feathers.

Bristle feathers have a stiff rachis with a few barbs near the base. They are located around the eyes and mouth; it is believed that they have a protective and sensory function.

Not all birds that have feathers use them for flight. Penguins use them for insulation against the cold of the air and water. Whereas, the ostrich utilizes its feathers for mating and for fluffing, which allows them to release heat and cool down.
