= Psittacofulvin =

Pigment in parrots

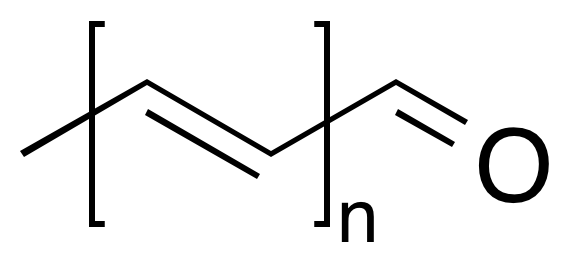
Generic structure of the psittacofulvins (n=6–9)

Psittacofulvin pigments, sometimes called psittacins, are responsible for the bright-red, orange, and yellow colors specific to parrots. In parrots, psittacofulvins are synthesized by a polyketide synthase enzyme that is expressed in growing feathers. They consist of linear polyenes terminated by an aldehyde group. There are five known psittacofulvin pigments - tetradecahexenal, hexadecaheptenal, octadecaoctenal and eicosanonenal, in addition to a fifth, currently-unidentified pigment found in the feathers of scarlet macaws. Colorful feathers with high levels of psittacofulvin resist feather-degrading Bacillus licheniformis better than white ones.

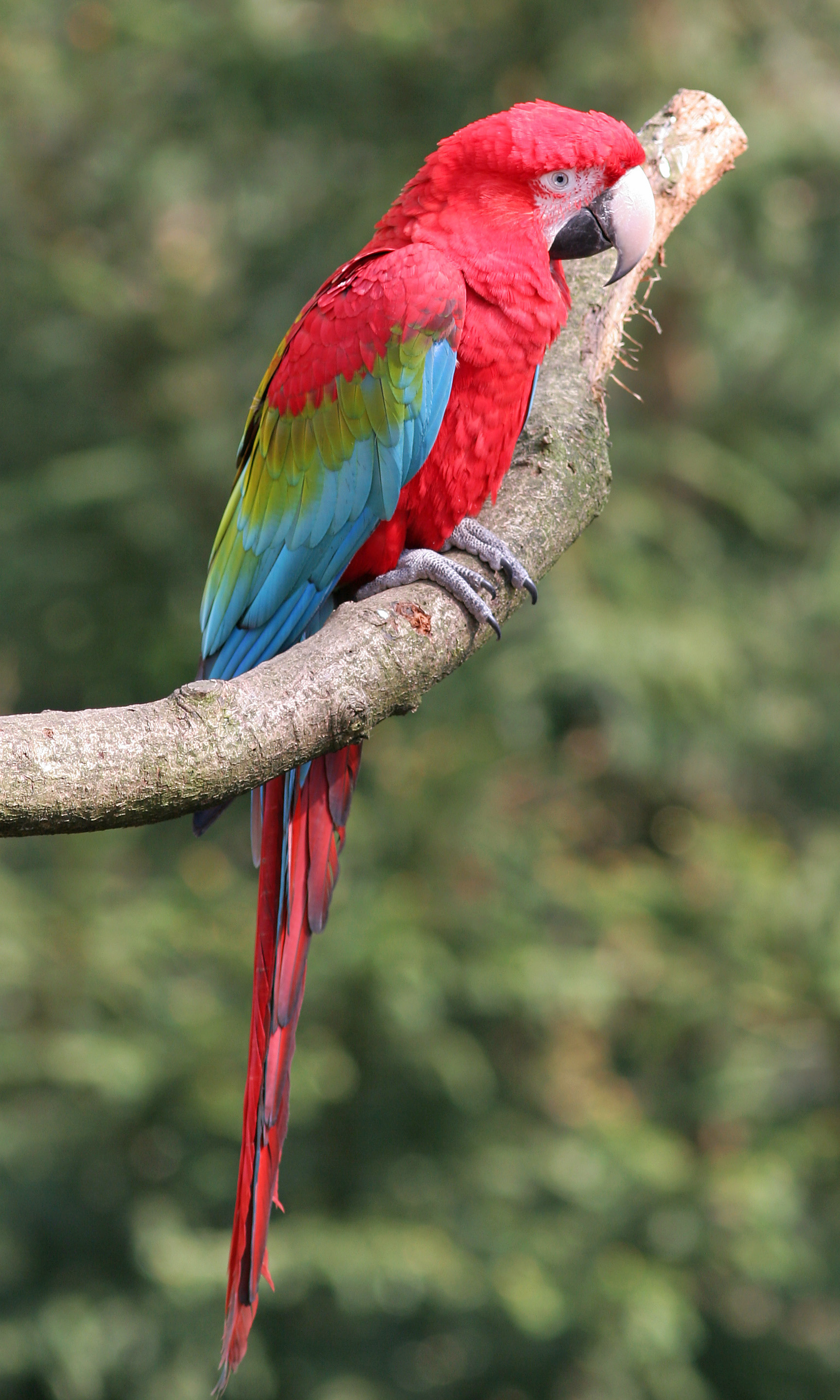
Red-and-green macaw

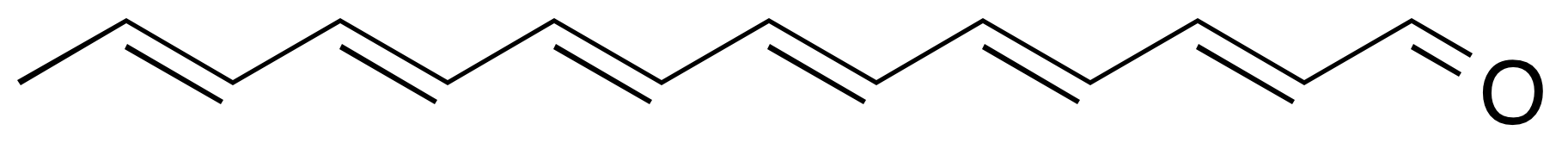
Tetradecahexaenal

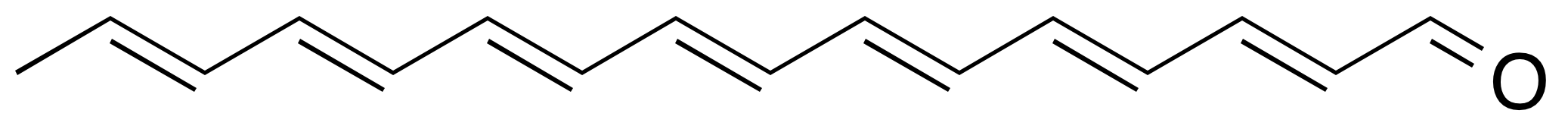
Hexadecaheptaenal

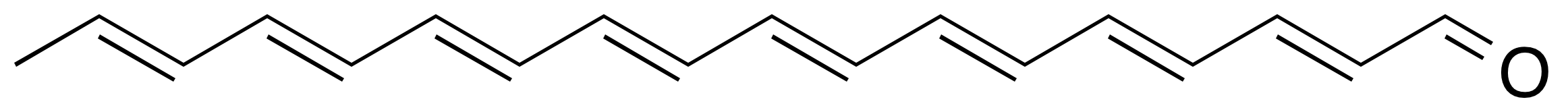
Octadecaoctaenal

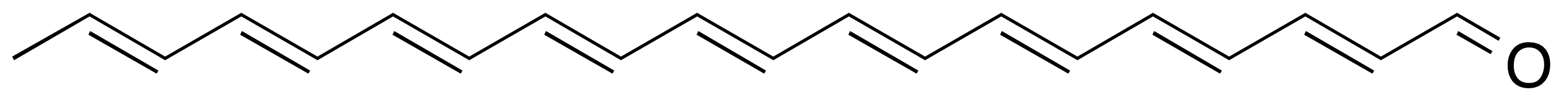
Icosanonaenal

Polyene-al molecular structures

Both carotenoids and psittacofulvins have narrow-band absorbance spectra, reflecting pale yellow or red pigmentary colors, making them difficult to distinguish between using spectral measurements. However, there are differences between them when researched spectroscopically. The carotenoid and psittacofulvin yellows are very similar, but the red parrot pigment offers an advantage: it creates a more deep-red color when compared to astaxanthin, the pigment's counterpart in most other birds.

Birds have tetrachromatic vision, which means that they have four types of cone cells with peak sensitivities to longwave (l), mediumwave (m), shortwave (s), and ultraviolet (uv) or violet (v) light as well as transparent oil droplets made of carotenoid filters (with mainly the pigments galloxanthin, zeaxanthin, and astaxanthin) that refine spectral sensitivities of the l, m, and s cone-types. These filters in front of the photoreceptors tune their spectral sensitivity to longer wavelengths. Birds have yet another spectral filter allowing them to absorb wavelengths in the far UV wavelength range.
