= Turacin =

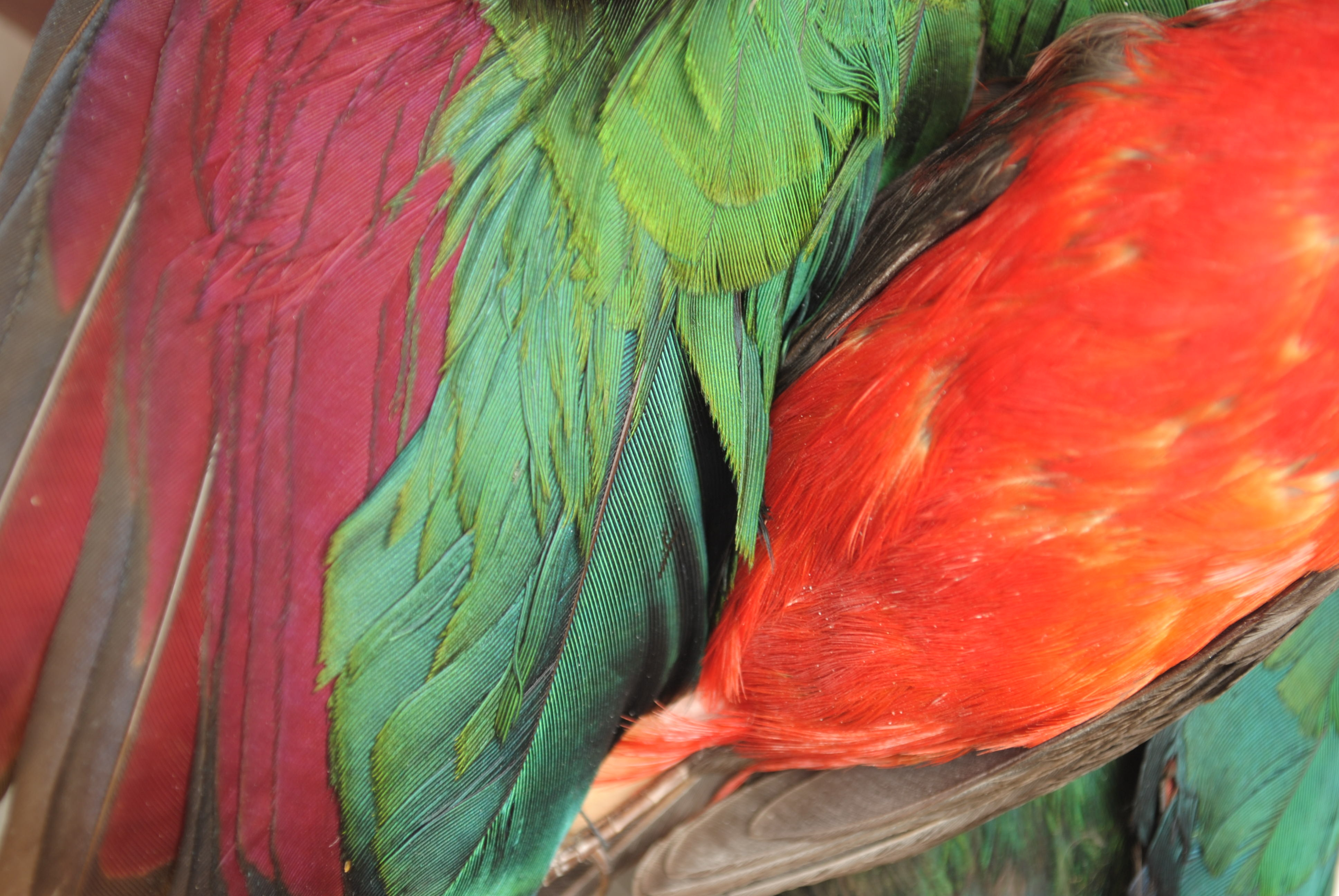
Turacin (Tauraco bannermani wing, left) compared to carotenoids (Ramphocelus bresilius belly, right). Green in center is due to turacoverdin.

Turacin is a naturally occurring red pigment that is 6% copper complexed to uroporphyrin III. Arthur Herbert Church discovered turacin in 1869. In his 1869 paper, Church detected turacin in twelve species of turaco and isolated it from four of them by dissolving it out of defatted feathers with dilute alkali. In a second paper published in 1892, he increased the number of turacin-bearing species to eighteen.

It is found only in the bird family Musophagidae, the turacos. Other birds derive their red coloration from carotenoids (bright and orange-reds) or phaeomelanins (rusty and brownish-reds).

It is often assumed that this coloration will wash out when the birds are bathing or after heavy rains, but this is true only if the water used for bathing happens to be very alkaline.

The copper(II) uroporphyrin III pigment in turaco feathers was studied using electron spin resonance by Jack Peisach first with Blumberg and later with Mims.

== See also ==
- Psittacofulvin, a brightly colored red and yellow pigment unique to parrots
- Turacoverdin, green pigment unique to turacos
