= TMEM156 =

Protein-coding gene in humans

Identifiers
- Aliases: TMEM156, transmembrane protein 156
- External IDs: MGI: 2685292; GeneCards: TMEM156

Gene location (Human)
Chr.	Chromosome 4 (human)
Band	4p14	Start	38,966,744 bp
Band	4p14	End	39,032,922 bp

Gene location (Mouse)
Chr.	Chromosome 5 (mouse)
Band	5|5 C3.1	Start	65,211,689 bp
Band	5|5 C3.1	End	65,249,475 bp
RNA expression pattern
Bgee	Human / Mouse (ortholog); Top expressed in: buccal mucosa cell; granulocyte; lymph node; spleen; bone marrow cell; appendix; epithelium of colon; testicle; blood; superficial temporal artery / Top expressed in: granulocyte; spermatid; blood; spleen; lymph node; mesenteric lymph nodes; thymus; embryo; bone marrow; Paneth cell; More reference expression data
BioGPS	n/a
Orthologs
Databases	NCBI: entry; OMA: entry
Species	Human	Mouse
Entrez	80008	243025
Ensembl	ENSG00000121895	ENSMUSG00000037913
UniProt	Q8N614	n/a
RefSeq (mRNA)	NM_001303228; NM_024943	NM_001370814
RefSeq (protein)	NP_001290157; NP_079219	n/a
Location (UCSC)	Chr 4: 38.97 – 39.03 Mb	Chr 5: 65.21 – 65.25 Mb
PubMed search
- Wikidata
View/Edit Human	View/Edit Mouse

TMEM156 is a gene that encodes the transmembrane protein 156 (TMEM156) in Homo sapiens. It has the clone name of FLJ23235.

== Gene ==
=== Locus ===
TMEM156 is located on the short arm of chromosome 4. It is found at position 4p14. It has four known transcripts, only two of which have proteins.

=== Size ===
TMEM156 is 66,499 bases and 296 amino acids in length. TMEM156 spans from 38,966,744 to 39,032,922 bp.

== mRNA ==
=== Splice variants ===
TMEM156 has one known splice variant, TMEM156-003. It has one transmembrane region and is 179 amino acids in length resulting in a lower molecular mass of 20.9 kDa. In addition the isoelectric point is 7.0633 and the gene has four transcripts.

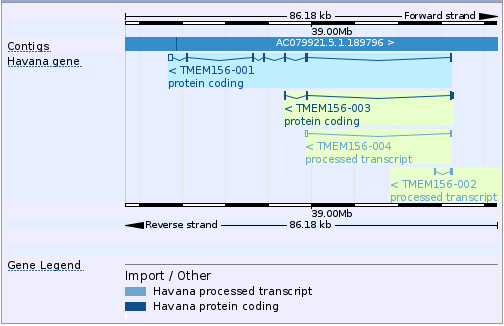
This image depicts the various transcript variants of TMEM156. It can be observed here that there are two variants that have protein coding function and two that are just processed transcripts.

Exons: TMEM156 consists of nine exons, their length and gene coordinates are listed accordingly.
Type	Length	Gene Coordinates
Alternative exon 1	64 bp	1 to 64
Alternative exon 2	912 bp	4 to 915
Exon 3	270 bp	11439 to 11708
Exon 4	261 bp	15807 to 16067
Exon 5	120 bp	17760 to 17879
Exon 6	84 bp	19305 to 19388
Exon 7	80 bp	33260 to 33339
Exon 8	95 bp	33907 to 34001
Exon 9	37 bp	37247 to 37283

=== Isoforms ===
There is one known isoform of TMEM156. This particular isoform uses an alternate in-frame splice site in the 3' coding region. The resulting isoform is shorter than the original.

== Protein ==
=== Structure ===
==== Primary structure ====
The TMEM156 protein is 296 amino acids in length. It has a molecular weight of 34.323 kDa and an isoelectric point of 7.98. The protein interacts with the membrane three times as seen in the figure below.

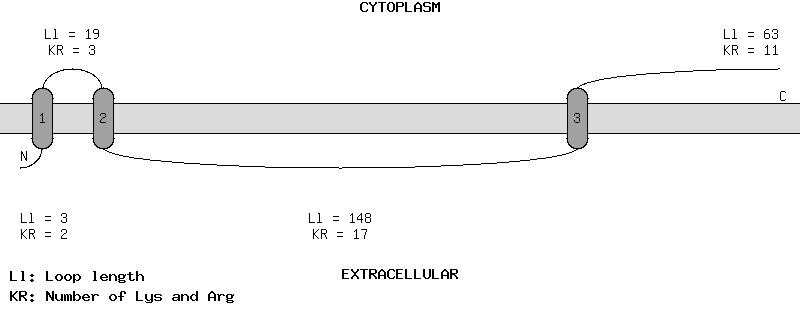
This image depicts the interaction of the protein with the membrane of the endoplasmic reticulum. It can be seen here that the protein crosses the membrane three times.

==== Secondary structure ====
TMEM156 has a secondary structure composed of primarily α-helices. Phyre was used to create this structure that can be viewed on the right hand side of this article. It is evident that the predicted protein structure is vastly composed of α-helices. The N terminus is located at the top of the image and the C terminus is at the bottom.

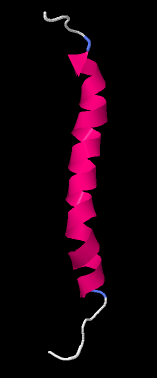
Phyre software was used to create a predicted 3-D structure of TMEM156. It can be seen that this protein is composed vastly of alpha helices. The N terminus is on the top of the image and the C terminus is located on the bottom.

==== Tertiary structure ====
This structure was predicted by analyzing the amino acid sequence using I-TASSER. The final result can be seen below.

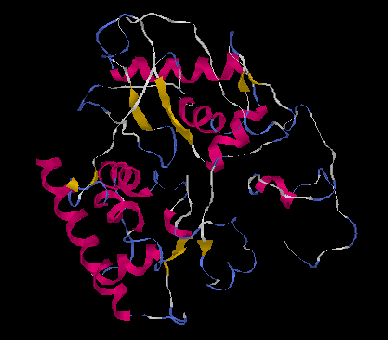
I-TASSER software was used to predict the tertiary structure of TMEM156. It is evident that the protein is composed primarily of alpha helices as seen by the magenta coils.

=== Post-translational modifications ===
Glycosylation at Asn 45 and Asn 156 along with N-glycosylation seen in the portion of the protein that is found in the cytoplasm.

=== Subcellular location ===
The k-NN tool suggests the location of TMEM156 in the endoplasmic reticulum of the cell with 44.4% certainty. The following locations were all predicted with 11.1% certainty: vacuolar, vesicles of secretory system, extracellular, plasma membrane, and mitochondrial.

== Expression ==
TMEM156 is expressed in several tissues including ascites, bone marrow, salivary glands, and vascular to name a few. This gene is not ubiquitously expressed, but is still evident in many tissues. This gene is predominately expressed in adults but there is a bit of expression in fetuses.

== Interacting proteins ==
- C12orf55-chromosome 12 open reading frame 55
- FAM92B-family with sequence similarity 92, member B
- NUGGC-nuclear GTPase, germinal center associated
  - plays a role as replication-related GTPase
- CEACAM21-carcinoembryonic antigen-related cell adhesion molecule 21
- CPNES-copine V
  - may function in membrane trafficking
  - exhibits calcium-dependent phospholipid binding properties
- FCRL1-Fc receptor-like 1
  - may function as an activating coreceptor in B-cells
  - may function in B-cell activation and differentiation
- MEI1-meiosis inhibitor 1
  - required for normal meiotic chromosome synapsis
  - may be involved in meiotic double strand breaks
- MZB1-marginal zone B and B1 cell-specific protein
  - associates with immunoglobulin M (IgM) both heavy and light chains
    - promotoes IgM assembly and secretion
- SPAG4-sperm associated antigen 4
  - may assist the organization and assembly of outer dense fibers (specific fibers to the sperm tail)
- SLC17A9-solute carrier family 17, member 9
  - involved in vesicular storage and exocytosis of ATP

== Homology ==
Transmembrane protein 156 has one known paralog. It also has various orthologs within eukaryotes. The table below compares an overarching sample of the known orthologs and one paralog. The specific lineage of TMEM156 is: Eukaryota; Metazoa; Chordata; Craniata; Vertebrata; Euteleostomi; Mammalia; Eutheria; Euarchontoglires; Primates; Haplorrhini; Catarrhini; Homindae; Homo.

Organism	Common name	Accession number	Sequence identity	Sequence similarity	Notes
Homo sapiens	human	XP_011512056	100%	100%	Mammal
Phycicoccus sp. Root101		WP_056919608	36%	56%	Archaea
Medicago truncatula	barrel medic	XP_003600988	52%	73%	Plantae
Acanthisitta chloris	rifleman	KFP78611	28%	49%	Aves
Struthio camelus australis		KFV80462	30%	48%	Aves
Chaetura pelagica	chimney swift	KFU95974	31%	50%	Aves
Tauraco erythrolophus	red-crested turaco	XP_009989935	32%	48%	Aves
Chlamydotis macqueenii	MacQueen's bustard	XP_010113687	33%	50%	Aves
Chelonia mydas	green sea turtle	XP_007059764	35%	54%	Reptile
Alligator mississippiensis	American alligator	XP_006273714	36%	56%	Reptile
Dasypus novemcinctus	nine-banded armadillo	XP_004459440	73%	81%	Mammal
Felis catus	domestic cat	XP_006931228	68%	77%	Mammal
Panthera tigris altaica	Amur tiger	XP_007098927	69%	78%	Mammal
Bubalus bubalis	water buffalo	XP_006066188	72%	83%	Mammal
Capra hircus	goat	XP_005681569	72%	83%	Mammal
Leptonychotes weddellii	Weddell seal	XP_006732368	72%	82%	Mammal
Ovis aries	sheep	XP_012035193	73%	84%	Mammal
Bison bison bison	bison	XP_010831883.1	74%	84%	Mammal
Camelus bactrianus	Bactrian camel	XP_010960972	74%	85%	Mammal
Vicugna pacos	alpaca	XP_015099523	75%	86%	Mammal
Pteropus vampyrus	large flying fox	XP_011364299	79%	89%	Mammal
Homo sapiens	humans	NP_061028.3	47%	58%	Mammal
