= West African dwarf =

West African dwarf may refer to

- A little person from West Africa
- West African Dwarf goat, a breed or landrace of domestic goat
- West African dwarf pig, a landrace of domestic pig
- West African Dwarf sheep, a breed or landrace of domestic sheep
