= Futuro Forestal S.A. =

German-Panamanian reforestation company

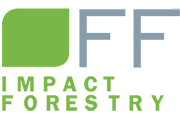
- Company type: Public
- Industry: Forest Investment Manager
- Founded: Panama City, Panama (1994)
- Founder: Andreas Eke, Iliana Armién
- Headquarters: Panama City, Republic of Panama
- Area served: Worldwide
- Key people: Andreas Eke (Director); Iliana Armién (Head Forester); Danilo Cedeno (General Manager, Nicaragua); Ricaute Carrera (Nursery Manager)
- Services: Forest investments; Eco-System Restoration; Corporate Social Responsibility project execution; Education
- Subsidiaries: Community & Forest Foundation
- Website: www.futuroforestal.com

Futuro Forestal S.A. is a German-Panamanian reforestation company that operates in Latin America. Established in 1994 in Panama, it is headquartered in Panama City. Futuro Forestal focuses on impact investment management in the tropical forestry industry. To date, the company has planted over 8,000 hectares of teak and mixed hardwood plantations on deforested pastureland, often under the Forest Stewardship Council (FSC) standard.

== History ==
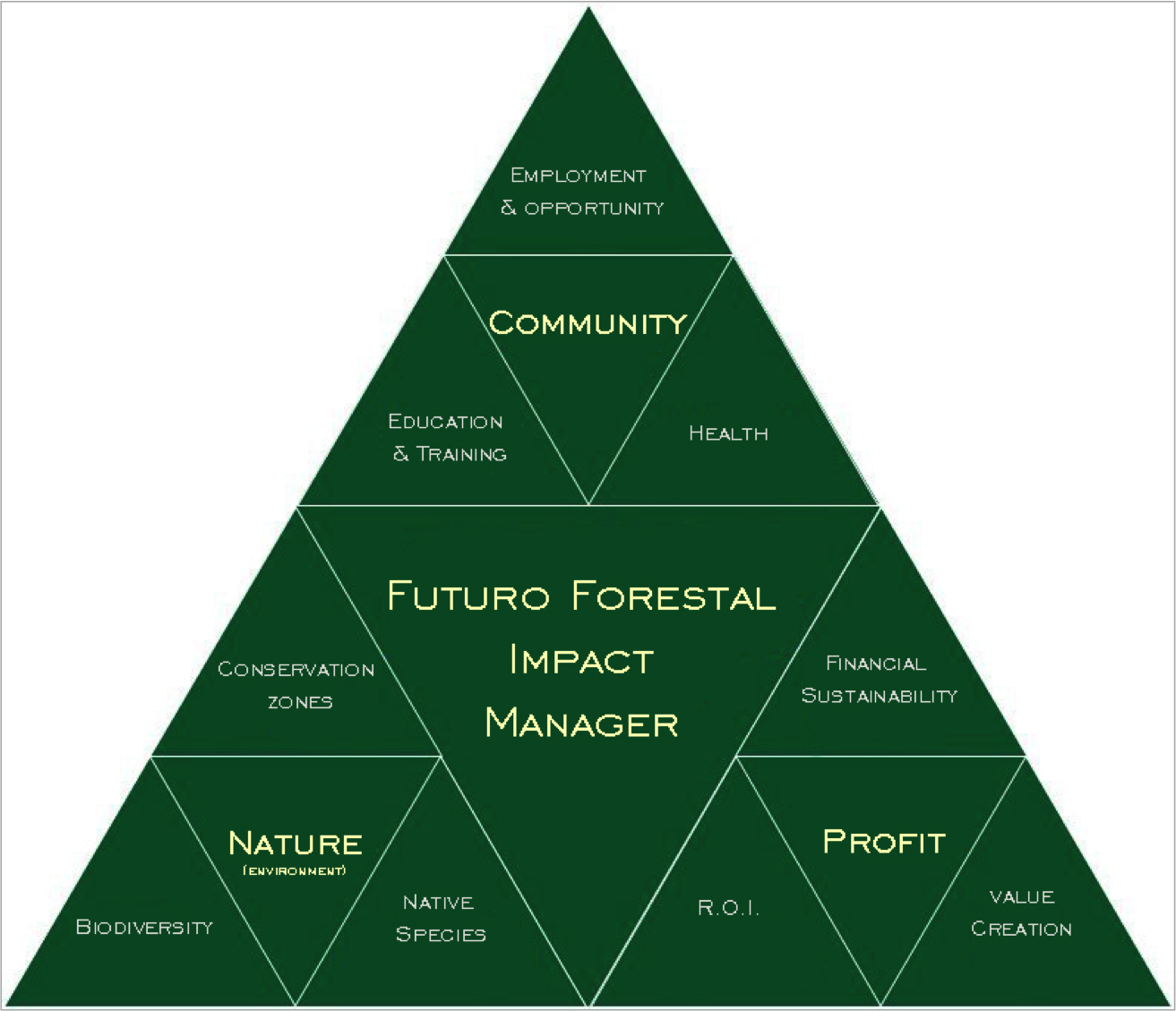
Possible Impact of Investments: From Triple bottom line to Impact Investment

Futuro Forestal was founded in 1994 by Andreas Eke and Iliana Armién. Since that time, the company developed from a small retail investment to a timber investment management organization to an impact forestry company with up to 2,500 employees.

- 1994: Futuro Forestal started its first reforestation, called "Proyecto Madera Fina" (Engl.: fine timber project), with 9 hectares in Panama.
- 1998: As first company in Panama, Futuro Forestal applies to FSC-standard.
- 1998: Futuro Forestal transferred as first company worldwide a Business-to-business-transaction from reforestation to carbon credit market.
- 2001: Opening of new offices and a nursery in Las Lajas, Chiriquí, Panama.
- 2003 & 2004: The reforestations of Futuro Forestal were rated as Latin America's best forest investment by rating agency SICIREC (abbr., span.: Sistemas de Circulación Ecológica, engl.: systems of ecological cycles).
- 2005: Futuro Forestal brings its first shipment of FSC-certified timber to the market. Referring to Jagwood+, the sale of timber from teak and yellow cedar brought a significantly higher price (US $120/m^{3}) than "[...] uncertified thinning wood (normally around 50-70 US$)" .
- 2006: Metafore Innovation Award for Futuro Forestal's "[...] WoodStockInvest program, which offers worldwide investors the opportunity to own a forest, invest in a high yield product and contribute to social and ecological development in Central America".
- 2006/2007: Futuro Forestal expanded its operations to Nicaragua and started a reforestation program in cooperation with the United Nations Framework Convention on Climate Change (UNFCCC).
- 2008: Futuro Forestal sold its retail-investment reforestations to its long-term sub-contractor Forest Finance. According to Forest Finance the reforestation-areas of Futuro Forestal brought significantly higher payoff than expected in revenue forecasts.
- 2009: German Investment Corporation (German: Deutsche Investitions- und Entwicklungsgesellschaft, abbr.: DEG) and Futuro Forestal started an environmental education initiative for primary schools in Nicaragua.
- 2011: The Company decided to refocus its efforts as an impact investment management company. To make it transparent to its stakeholders, Futuro Forestal reaffirmed its support of the Ten Principles of the United Nations Global Compact.
- 2012: The Global Exchange for Social Investment (GEXSI) and Futuro Forestal established a strategic partnership. Through it, Futuro Forestal's experience and methodology will be adopted for an upcoming timber-project in Madagascar.

== Services ==
Futuro Forestal provides sustainable reforestation services including timber investment management, ecosystem restoration, Corporate Social Responsibility (CSR) project execution, and social services like education for rural communities.

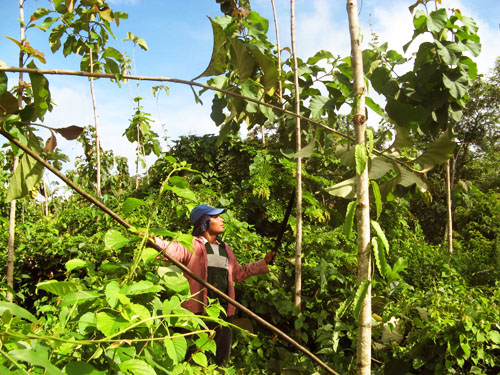
2 year old reforestation of Futuro Forestal with teak.

=== Timber investment ===
Futuro Forestal develops plantations that incorporate native hardwood species suited to specific soil conditions to foster diverse habitats for wildlife while allocating significatnt land areas to environmental protection. Furthermore, the company has been the first to sell carbon credits from reforestation as a business in Panamá" (Montagnini 2005, p. 181).

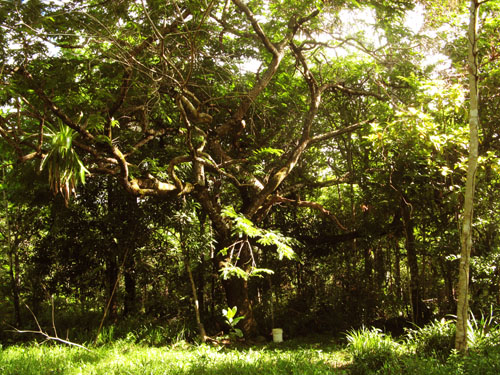
14-year-old reforestation of Futuro Forestal with native species.

=== Ecosystem restoration ===
Ecosystem restoration is the return of a damaged ecological system to a stable, healthy, and sustainable state. Futuro Forestal was awarded an important mitigation project for Minera Panama. The 7,000+ hectare project aims to:

- Restore degraded land using angiosperms and pioneer species,
- Establish species natural to the area,
- Optimize ratio and distribution of species used,
- Promote wildlife function through the establishment of trees with food functions, and
- Provide significant biodiversity with the support of experimental nurseries with native species.

=== CSR project execution ===
In view of CSR projects is solely the sustainability of reforestation's social and environmental impact.

=== Education ===
Together with Nicaraguan Federal Ministry for Economic Cooperation and Development, Futuro Forestal started environmental education in forest-dependent communities. Children are educated in primary schools and adults get theoretical knowledge about agroforestry, like sheep-farming with Pelibüeys and beekeeping. Practical development is generated through microcredits for sheep and beehives.

=== Scientific cooperation ===
In 2001 Futuro Forestal, the Native Species Reforestation Project of the Yale University's School of Forestry and Environmental Studies & the Smithsonian Tropical Research Institute conducted a native species project in Panama. Through this, the partners researched native species silvicultural and practical application of forest management techniques.

== Subsidiary ==
Forest & Community Foundation (nonprofit)
