= Cameroon sheep =

Cameroonian breed of sheep

Cameroon Dwarf
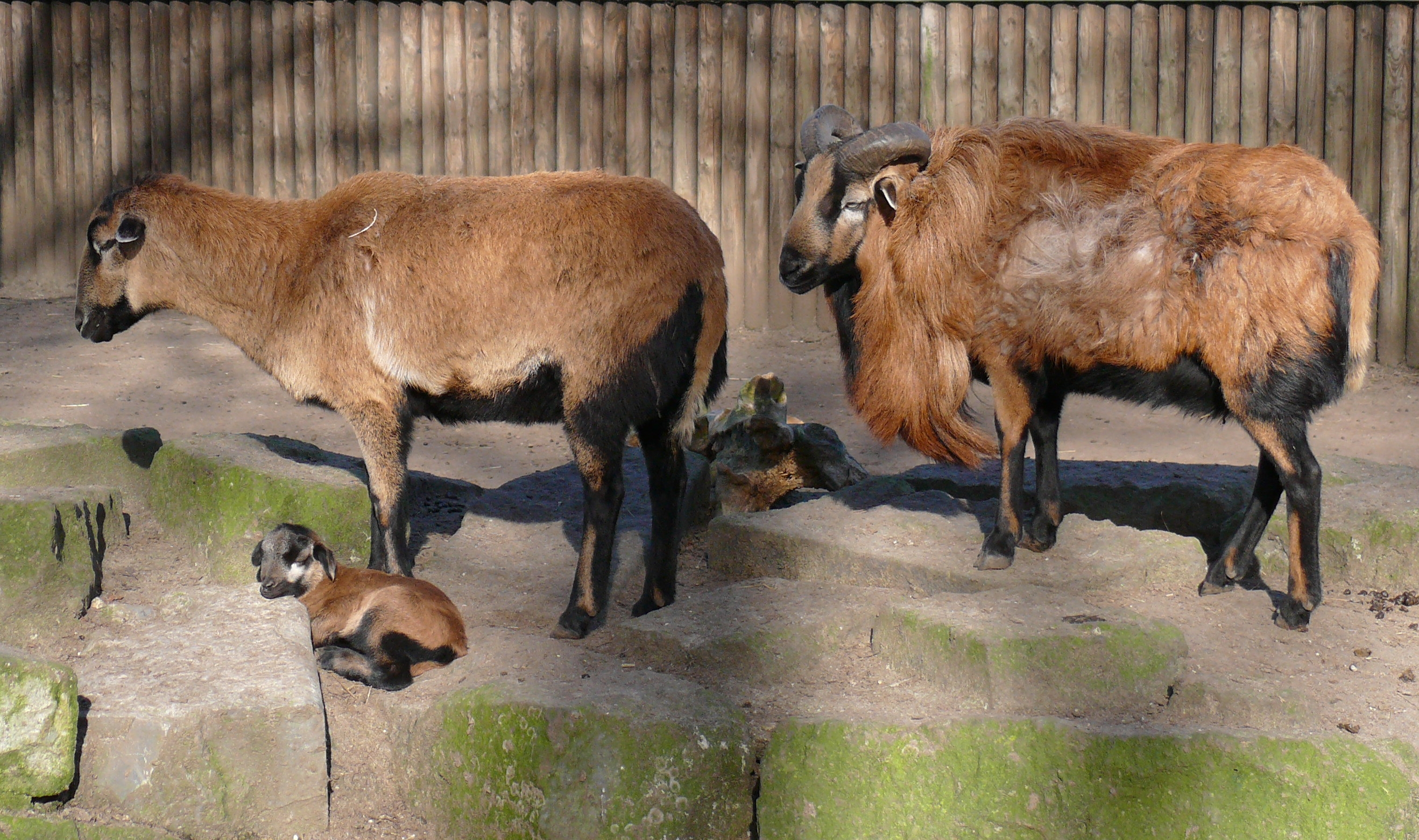
- Conservation status: DAD-IS (2021): unknown
- Other names: Cameroon; Djallonké; Fouta Djallon
- Country of origin: Cameroon
- Distribution: Cameroon

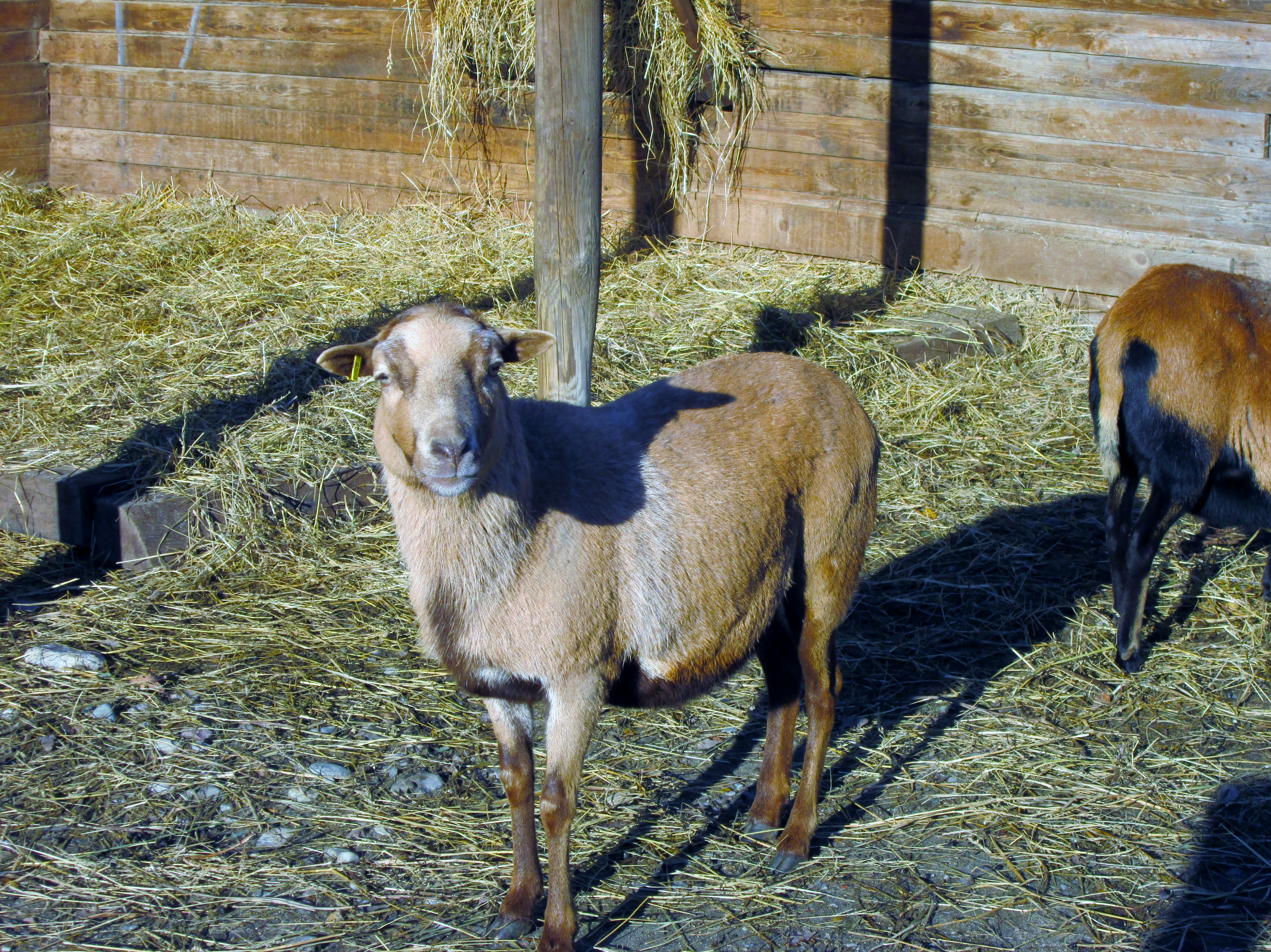
Cameroon sheep at Pombia Safari Park, Italy

The Cameroon or Cameroon Dwarf is a Cameroonian breed of domestic sheep. It belongs to the West African Dwarf group of breeds. Some have been exported to Europe.

== Characteristics ==
The Cameroon Dwarf is a hardy sheep. It is normally brown with a black belly and black markings to the head and legs. Has a hair coat, and in winter grows a fine under-coat; it sheds this in springtime. Ewes have high prolificacy and mature early; they are capable of producing three crops of lambs every two years. Ewes typically weigh between 35 and 50 kilograms (80 and 110 lb), and rams between 45 and 60 kilograms (100 and 130 lb). The life expectancy is 10 to 12 years, though some Cameroon sheep may live as long as 20 years.
