= Pombia =

- Comune
- Comune di Pombia
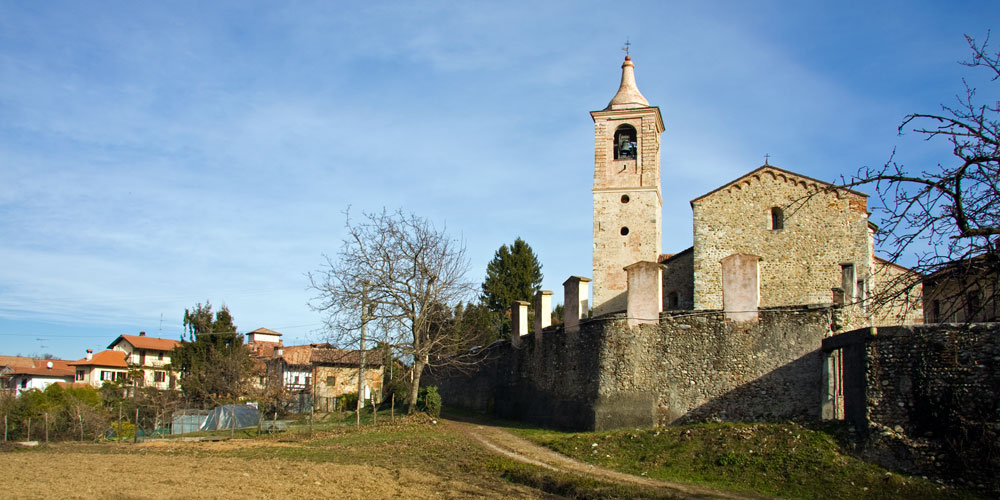
- View of the Comune

- Coat of arms

- Location within Italy Location within Piedmont
- Coordinates: 45°39′N 8°38′E
- Country: Italy
- Region: Piedmont
- Province: Novara (NO)

Government
  - Mayor: Nicola Arlunno

Area
  - Total: 12.0 km^{2} (4.6 sq mi)

Population (Dec. 2004)
  - Total: 1,834
  - Density: 153/km^{2} (396/sq mi)
- Time zone: UTC+1 (CET)
  - Summer (DST): UTC+2 (CEST)
- Postal code: 28050
- Dialing code: 0321

Pombia is a comune (municipality) in the Province of Novara in the Italian region Piedmont, located about 100 kilometres (62 mi) northeast of Turin and about 20 kilometres (12 mi) north of Novara. The commune is known for its Safari Park, established in 1976.

== History ==
It has Roman origins when it was called Flavia Plumbia. After the fall of the Western Roman Empire and the Lombardic conquest of northern Italy, it was the seat of a county, later, after Charlemagne's conquest, ruled by Frank feudataries.
