= Pombia Safari Park =

Attraction in Northern Italy

Coordinates: 45.6500°N 8.6333°E

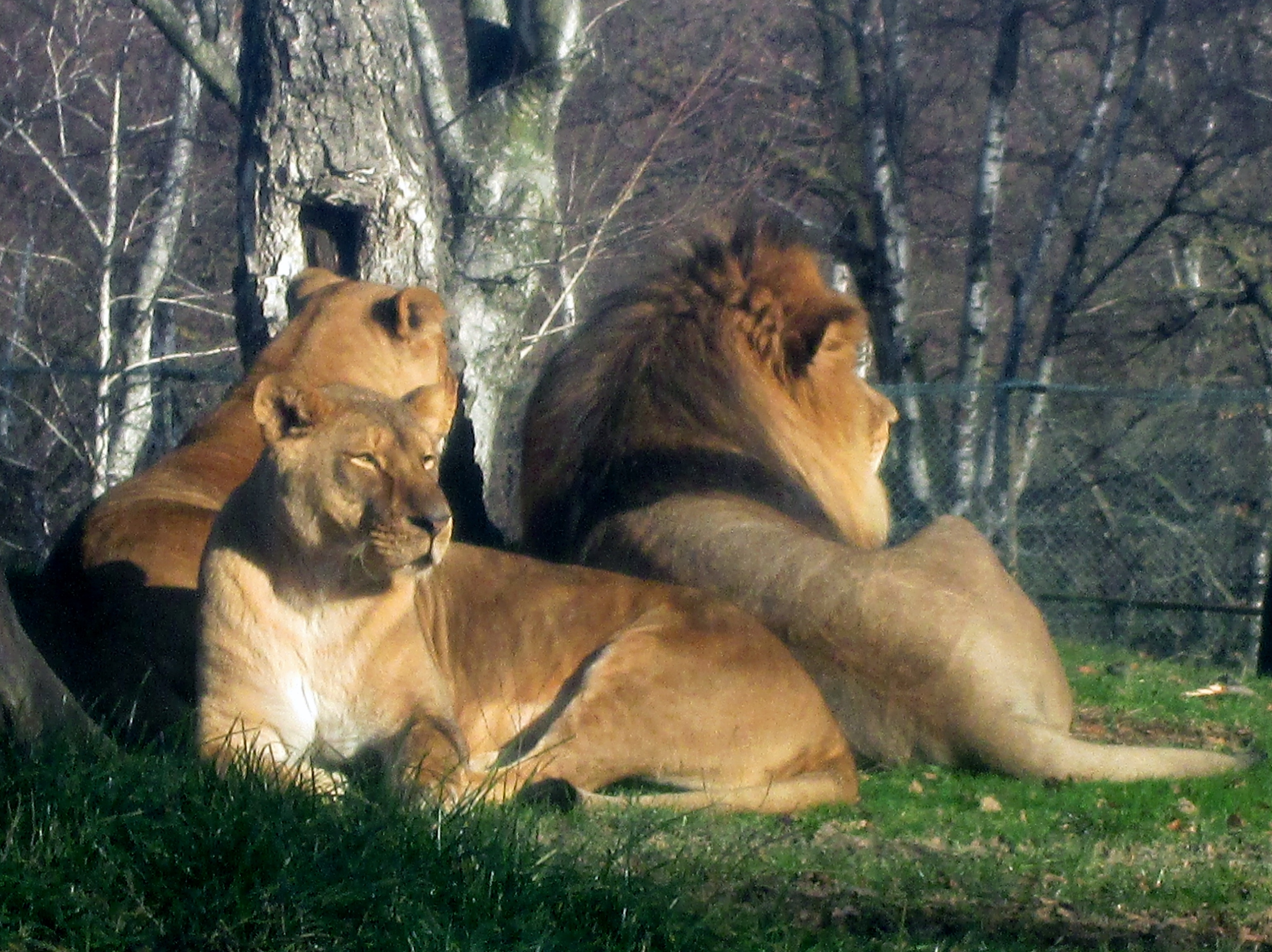
- Lions
- Interactive map of Pombia Safari Park
- Type: Safari Park, Zoo, Amusement park
- Location: Pombia, Italy
- Area: 400.000 m2
- Created: 1976
- Status: Open all year

Pombia Safari Park is a safari park, zoo and amusement park in Pombia, Piedmont, northern Italy, created by Angelo Lombardi in 1976; extending over an area of 400,000 square metres. After the gradual decline of the old structure, acquired by Orfeo Triberti, owner since 1999, the park has undergone a remarkable recovery and expansion in the years ahead. It consists of two distinct areas – the Safari Park and an entertainment area.

The Safari Park has also signed a collaboration in agreement with the Faculty of Veterinary Medicine of the University of Turin on research projects that relate to the pathology and the welfare of farm animals and the conservation of species at risk of extinction.

== Birth of the white lion ==
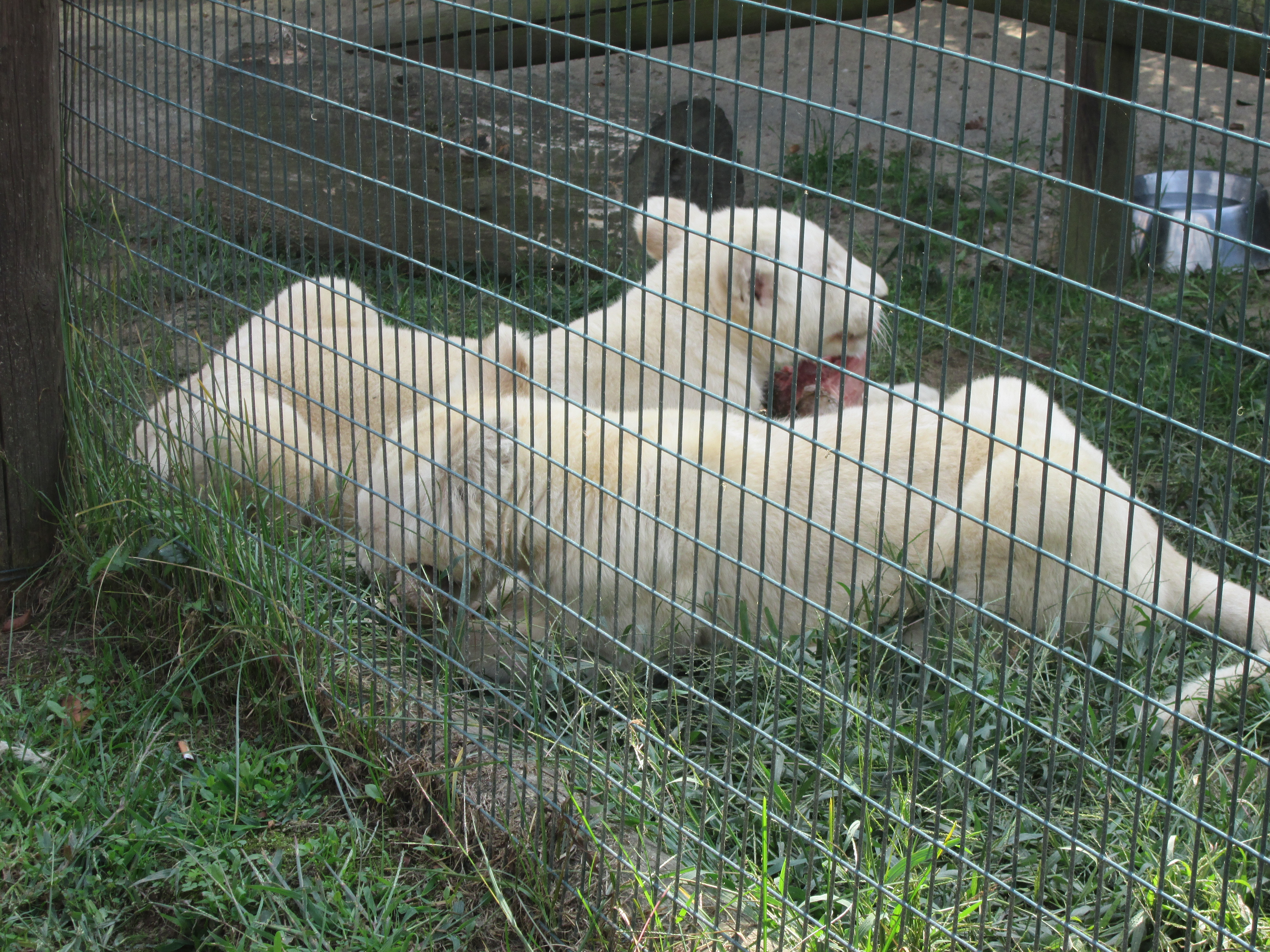
White lion cubs in 2014

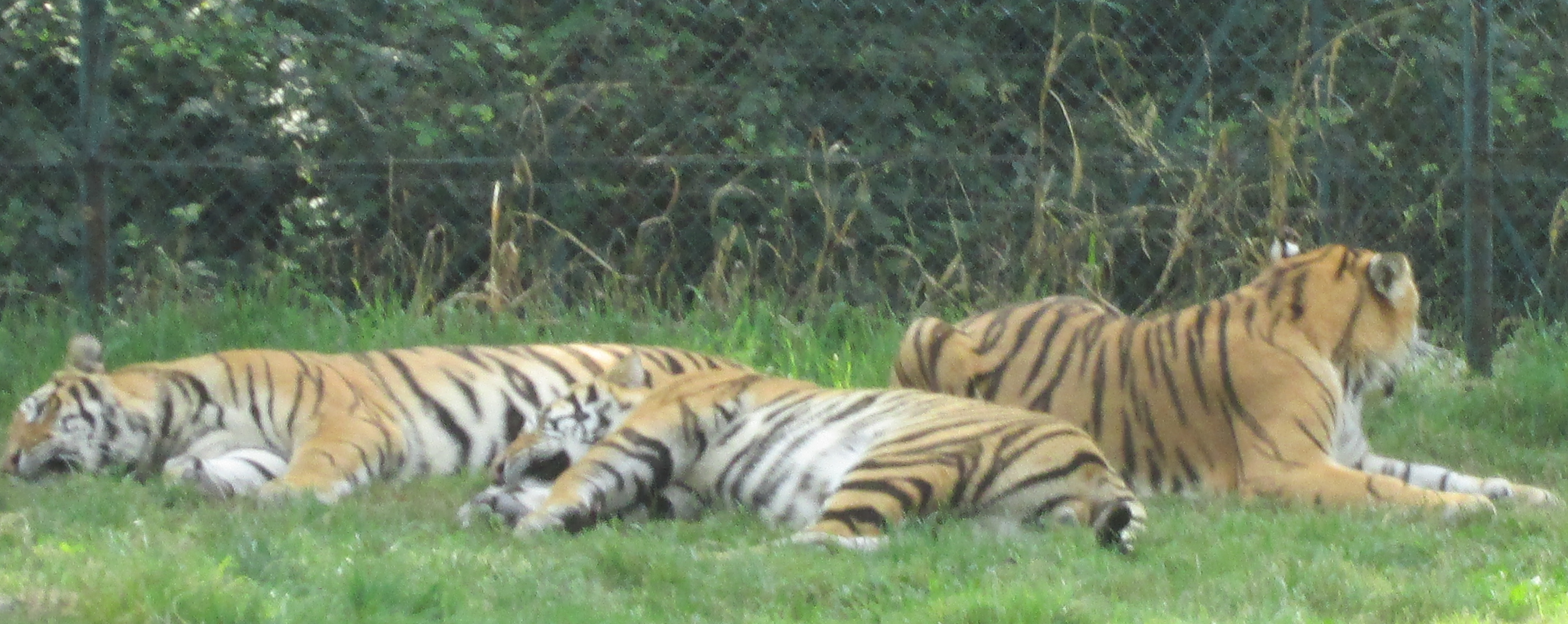
Siberian tigers in their habitat

In September 2004, after three months of gestation, a pair of white lions, called Flash and Moon, imported to the Safari Park by a German park, gave birth to their first litter. During the birth process, however, there were some complications that required pharmacological intervention, and starting from the second day, the cubs were subtracted from the mother due to a shortage of milk, and despite the use of incubators and bottle feeding, the cubs contracted a virus that took their lives in less than a month.

Two years later in 2006, by the same couple, a white lioness called Ashanti was born and survived to adulthood for the first time in Italy. According to a biologist of the park, Cathrin Schröder, the cub was immediately removed from parental care as the mother did not care about her, so the animal was bottle fed with a milk powder with high protein content.

== SOS Elephants ==
SOS Elephants is a non-profit foundation established in July 2011 by Pombia Safari Park to promote the conservation of Borneo elephants. Its mission is to ensure the long-term survival of the pygmy elephants of the State of Sabah, Borneo (Malaysia). In 2014, the park promoted the initiative to give more support to the foundation in support of the species. Due to the success of SOS Elephants, which is devoted a share of each ticket, the holder Orfeo Triberti would indeed create in Borneo, an area similar to a reserve, in which they can live and increase by number, because pygmy elephants are present exclusively on the island. The missions of SOS Elephants are to provide technical support, financial and administrative management programs, and the protection of species of elephant present in their respective protected areas, assisting in the management of protected areas or strongholds for elephants in their natural habitats, support the initiatives captive breeding and research programs conducted in the countries of origin of this species of elephant, as well as help to participate in the formulation of a comprehensive plan for captive breeding of the species of elephant.

== Animals ==
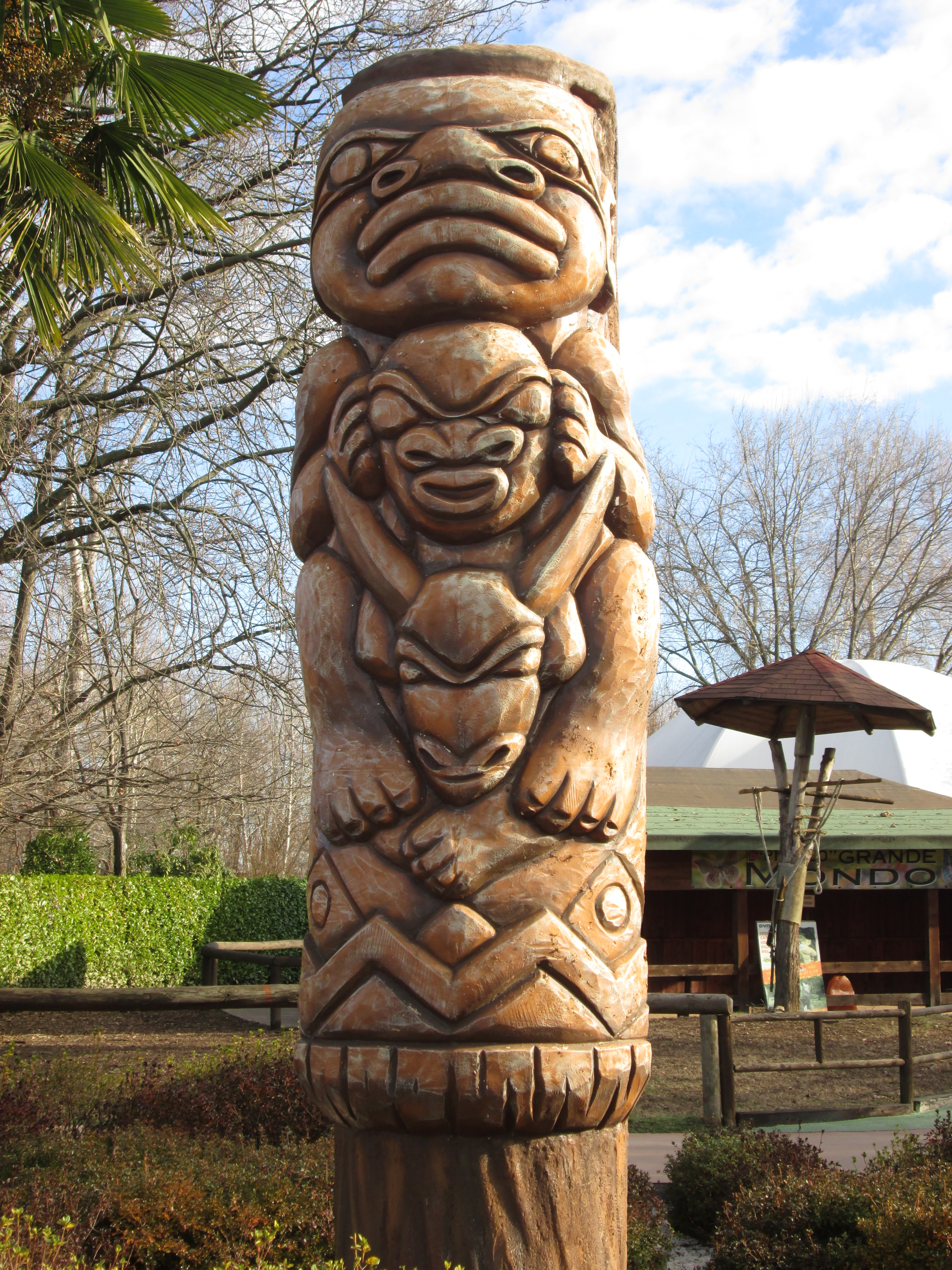
African totem along the park

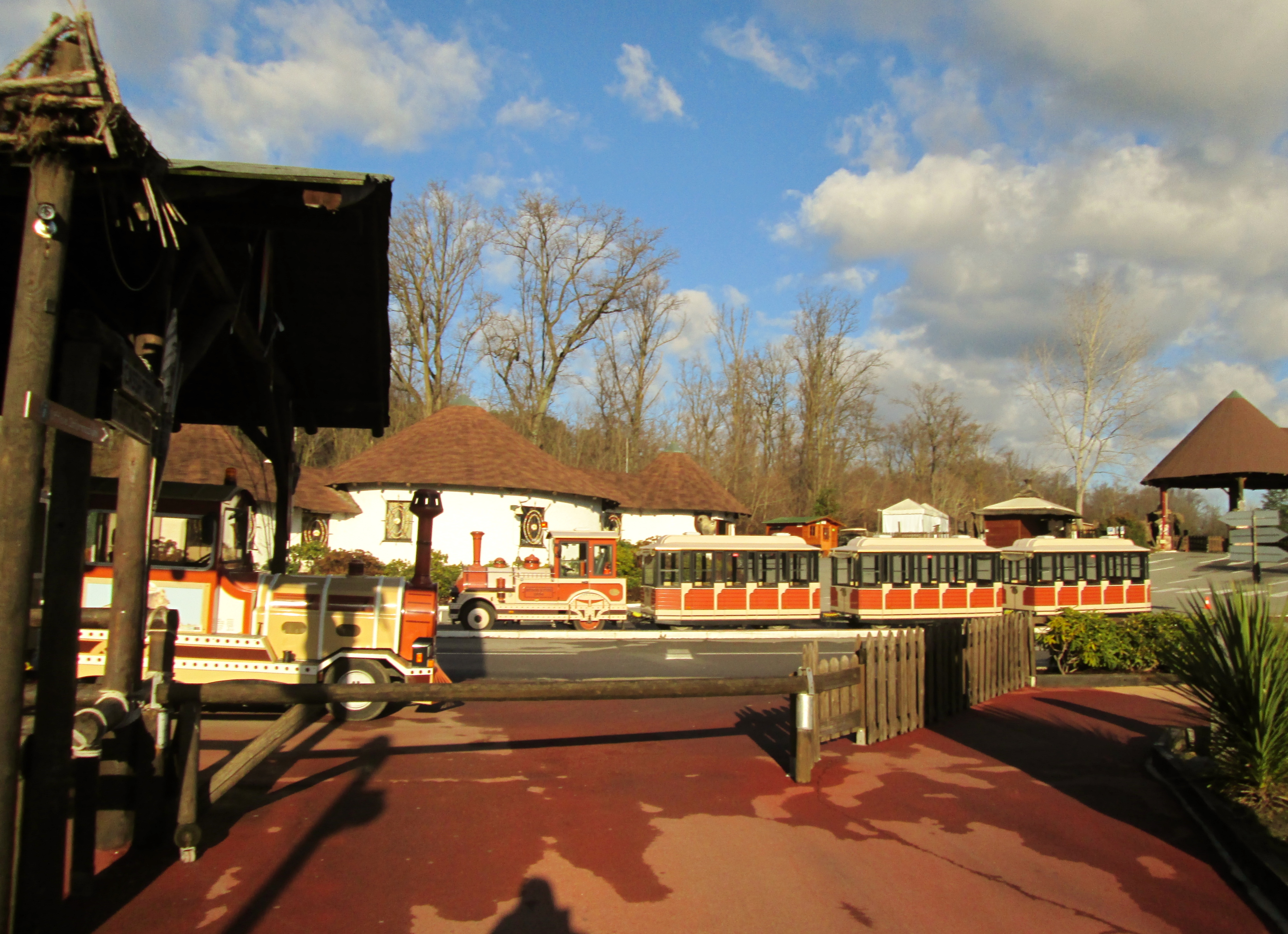
Electric trains used for the safari

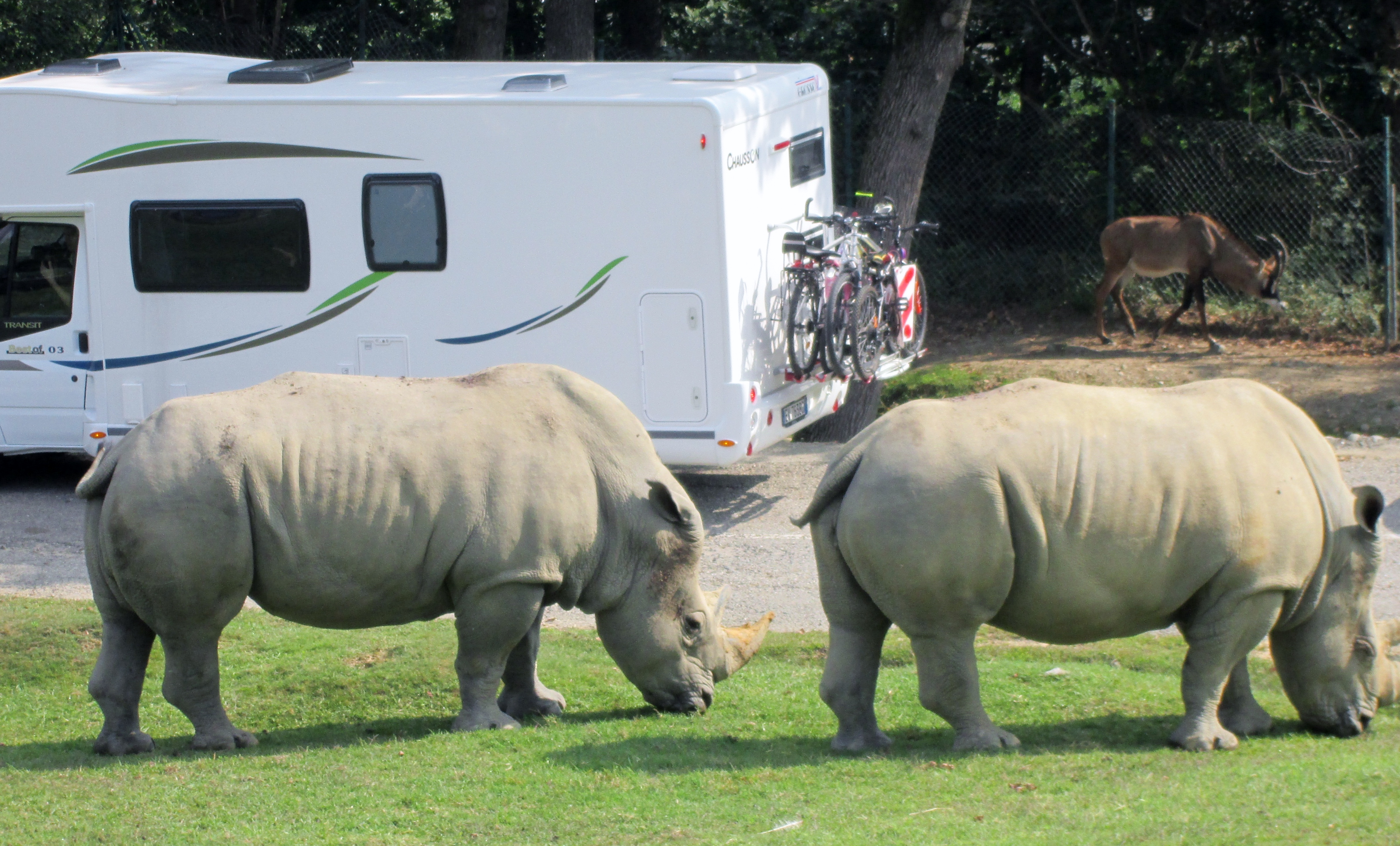
Southern white rhinos along the park

- Cheetah
- Tiger
- African lion
- Hyena
- Ring-tailed lemur
- Southern white rhinoceros
- Pony
- Grant's zebra
- Hippopotamus
- Llama
- Dromedary camel
- Rothschild's giraffe
- Watusi cattle
- Cameroon sheep
- Goat
- Common eland
- Scimitar oryx
- Crested porcupine
- Chapman's zebra
- Nyala
- Guanaco
- Waterbuck
- Gemsbok
- Horse
- Cow
- European mouflon
- Barbary sheep
- Great white pelican
- Roan antelope
- Hamadryas baboon
- Addax
- American bison
- Wild yak
- Donkey
- Pig
- White donkey
- Striped skunk

== Gallery ==
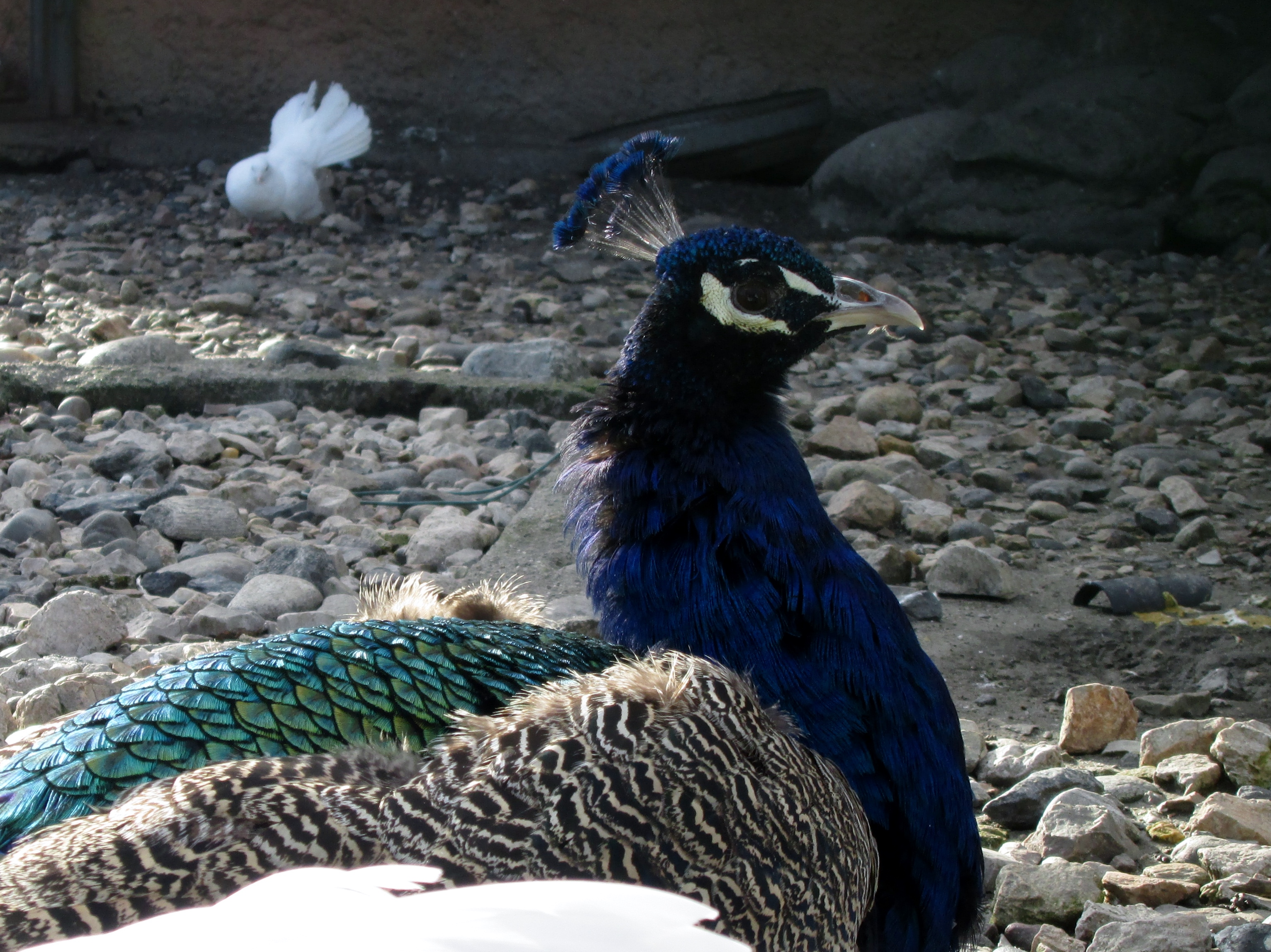
Peacock

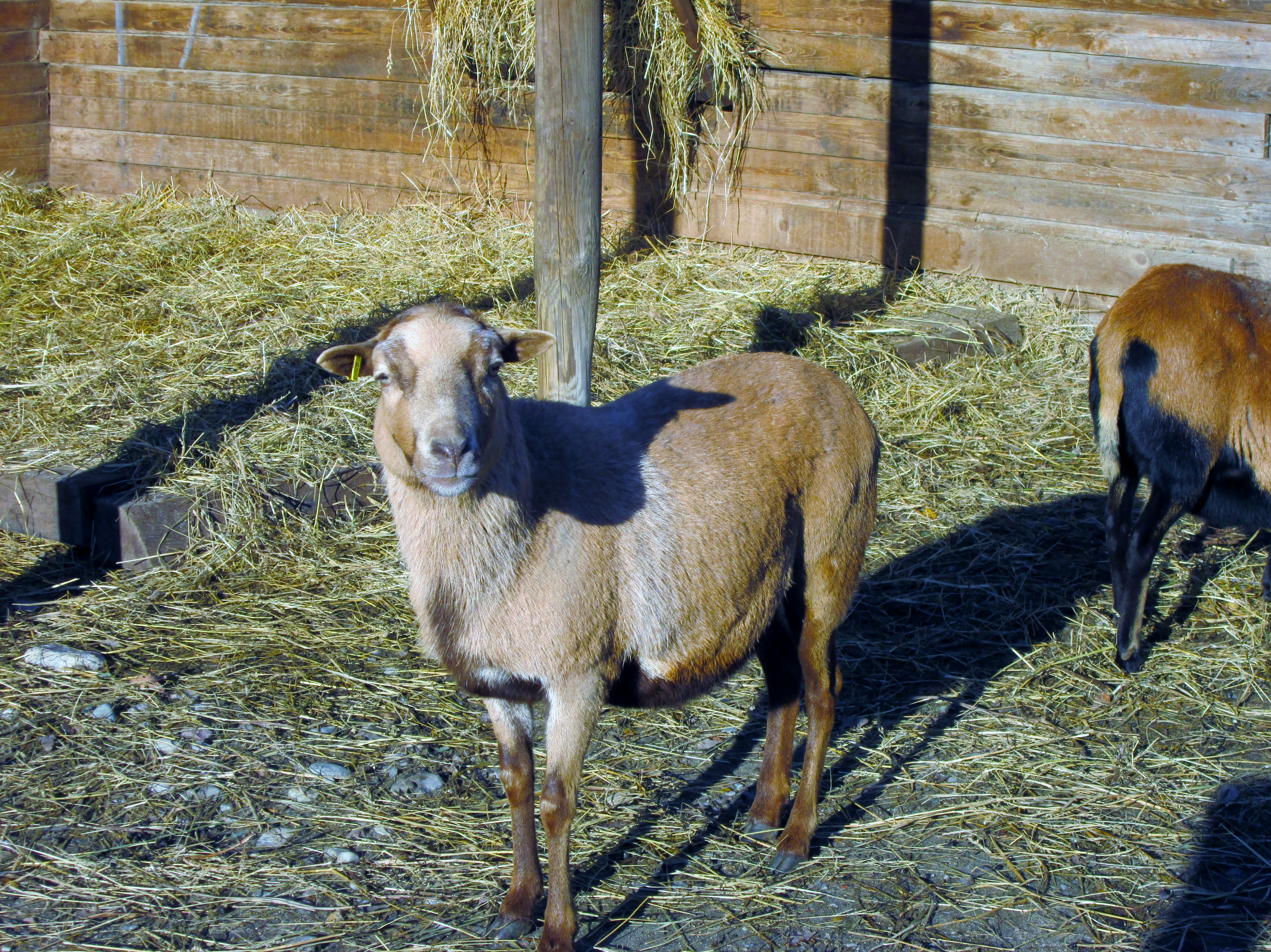
Cameroon sheep

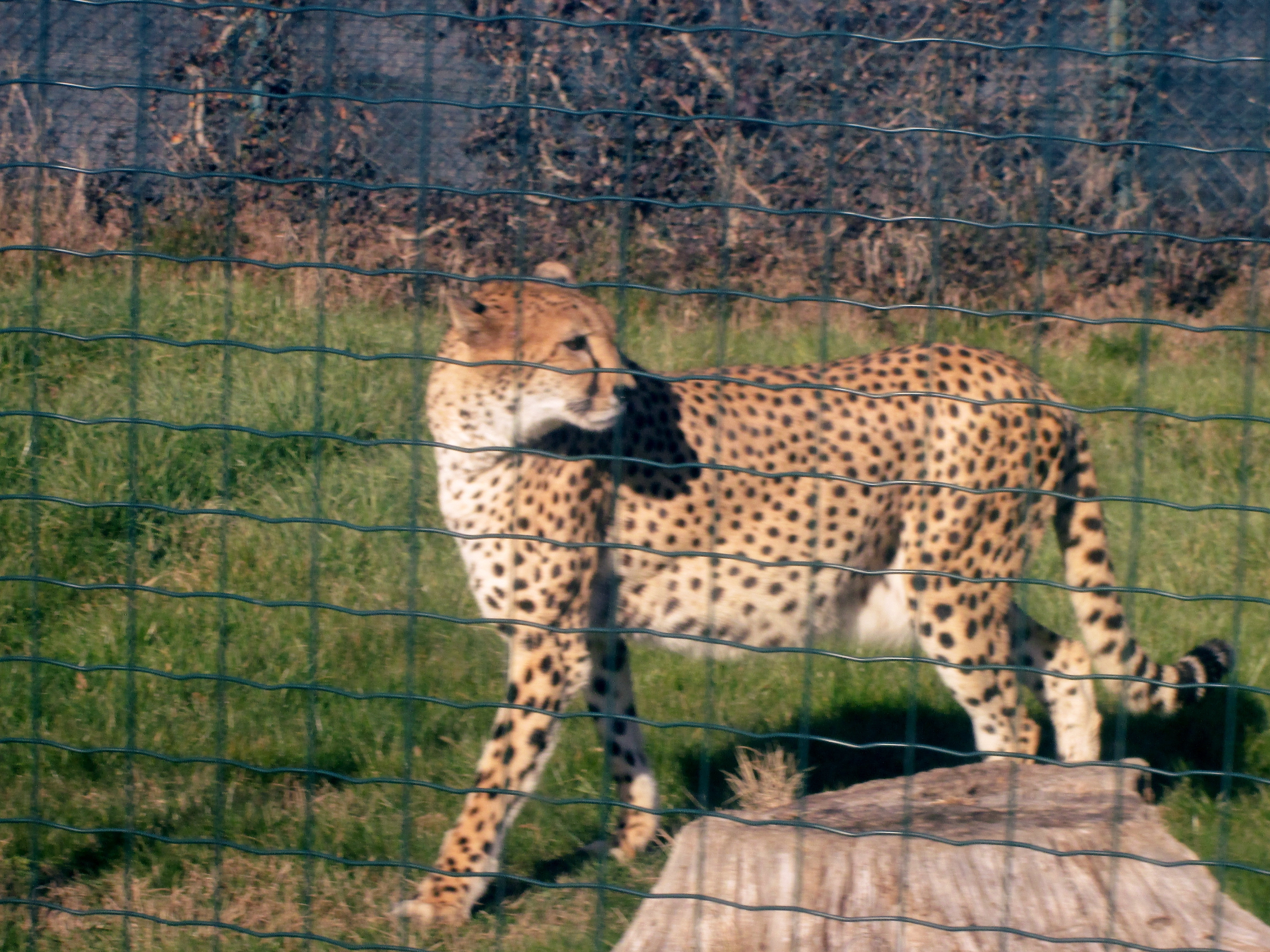
South African cheetah

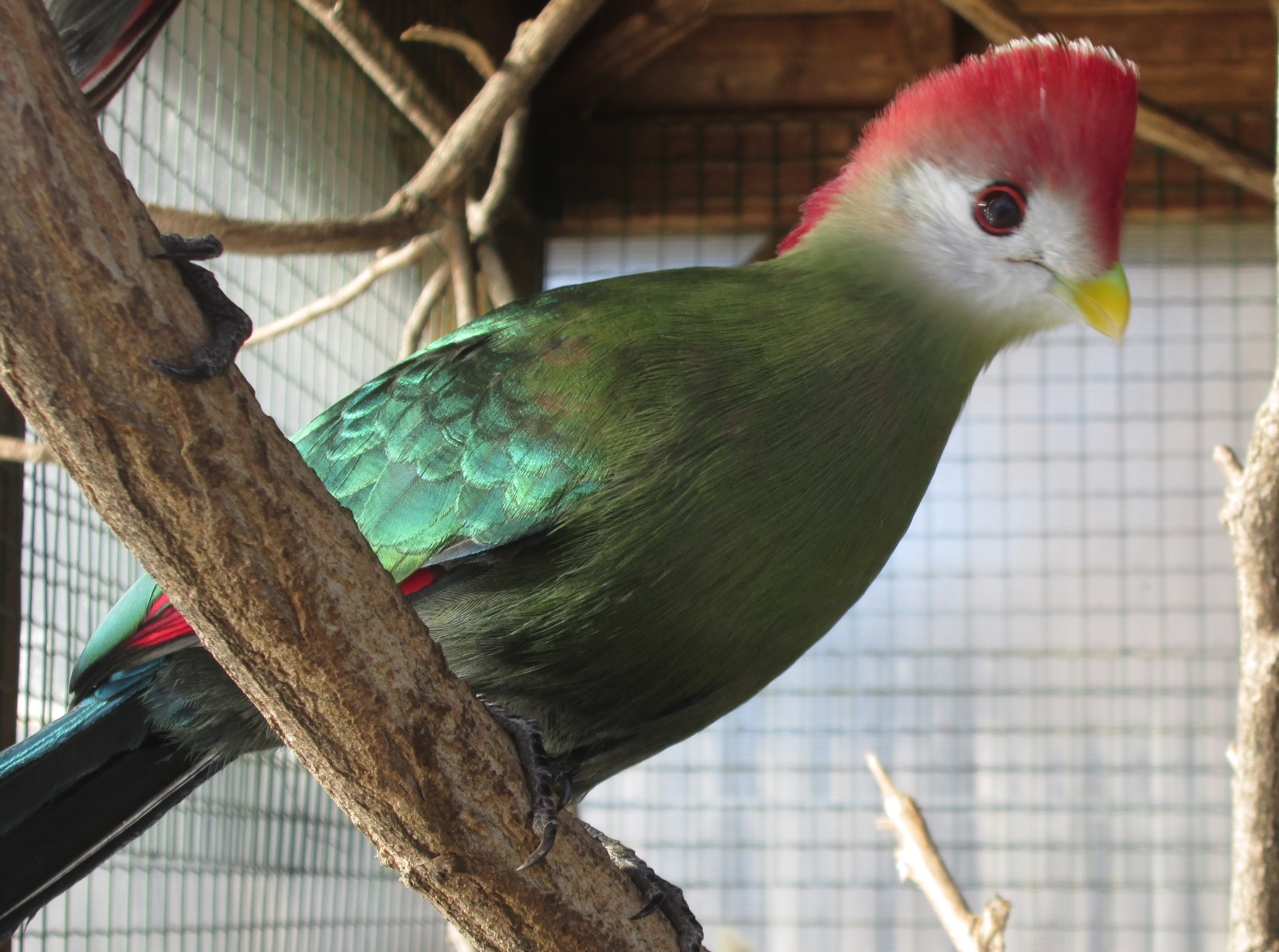
Red-crested turaco

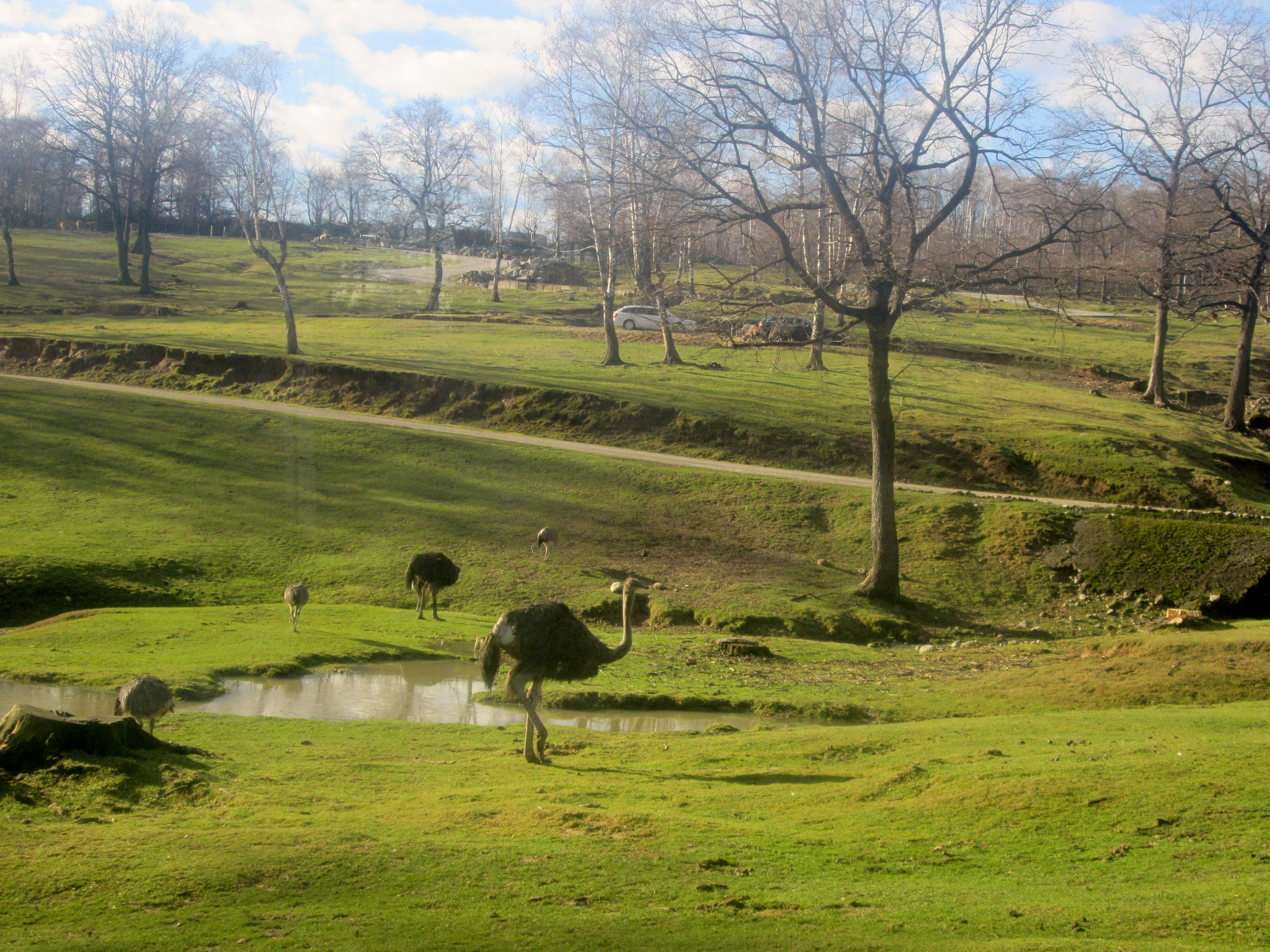
Rheas and ostriches

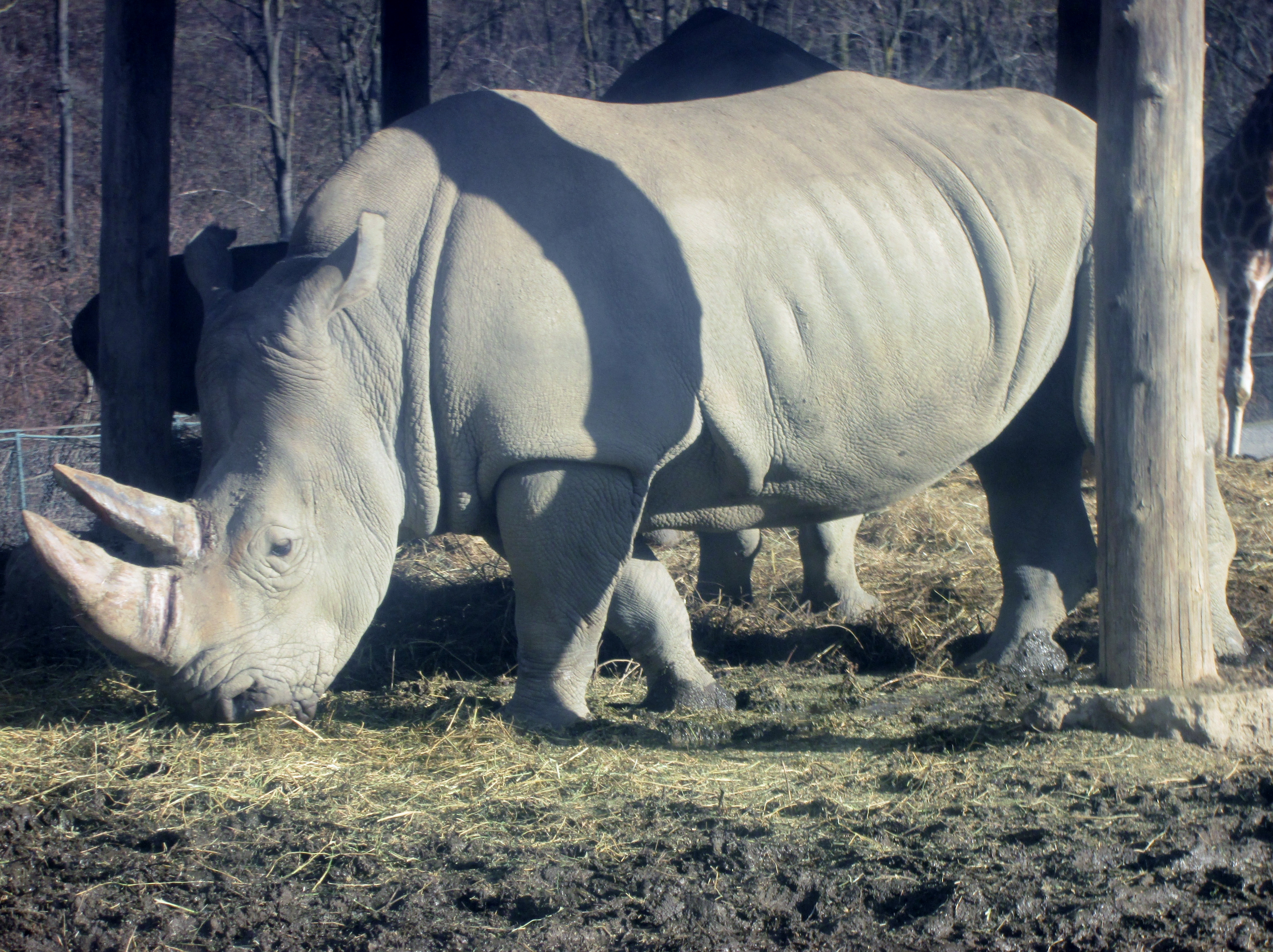
Southern white rhinoceros

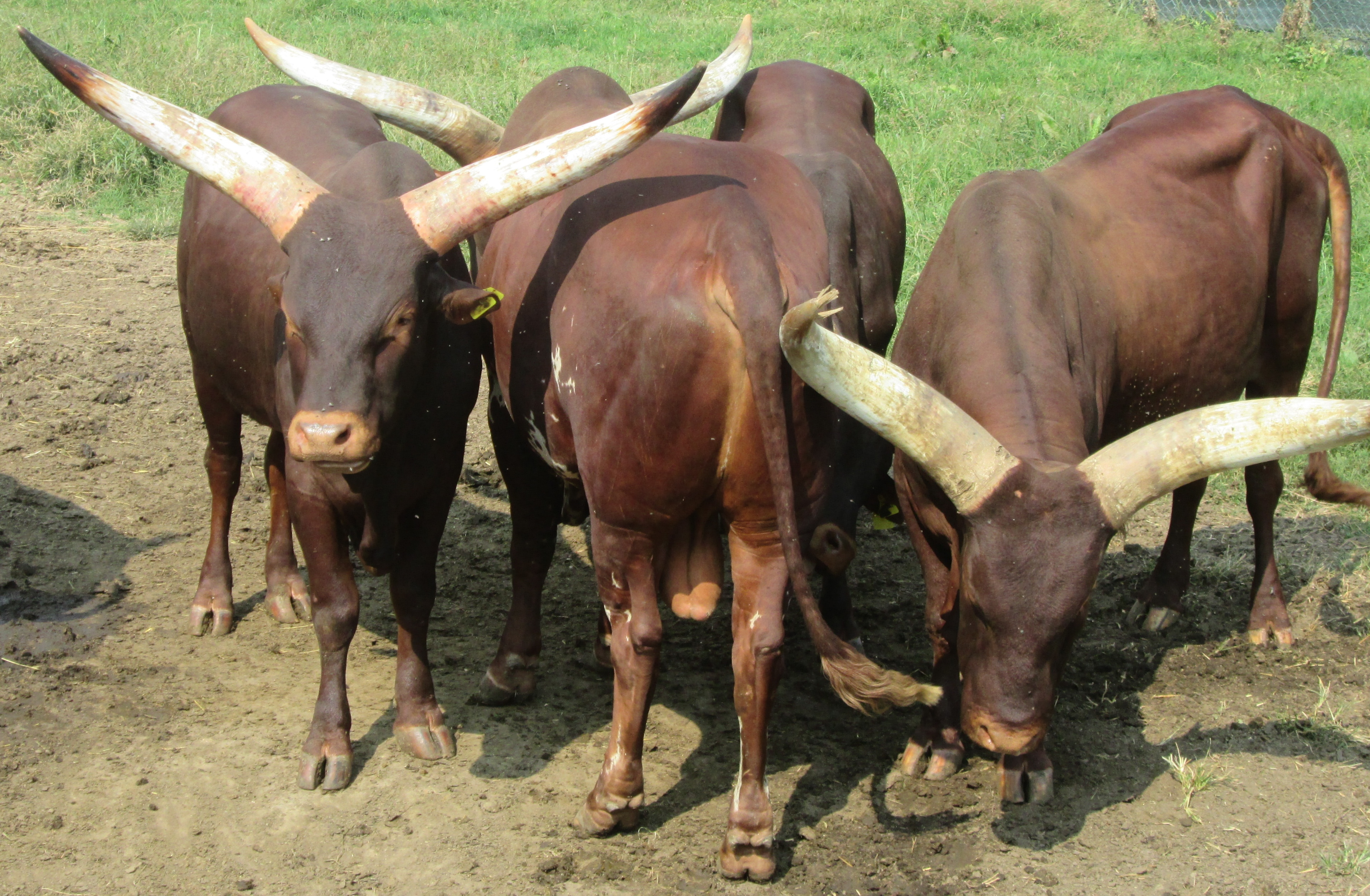
Watusi cattle

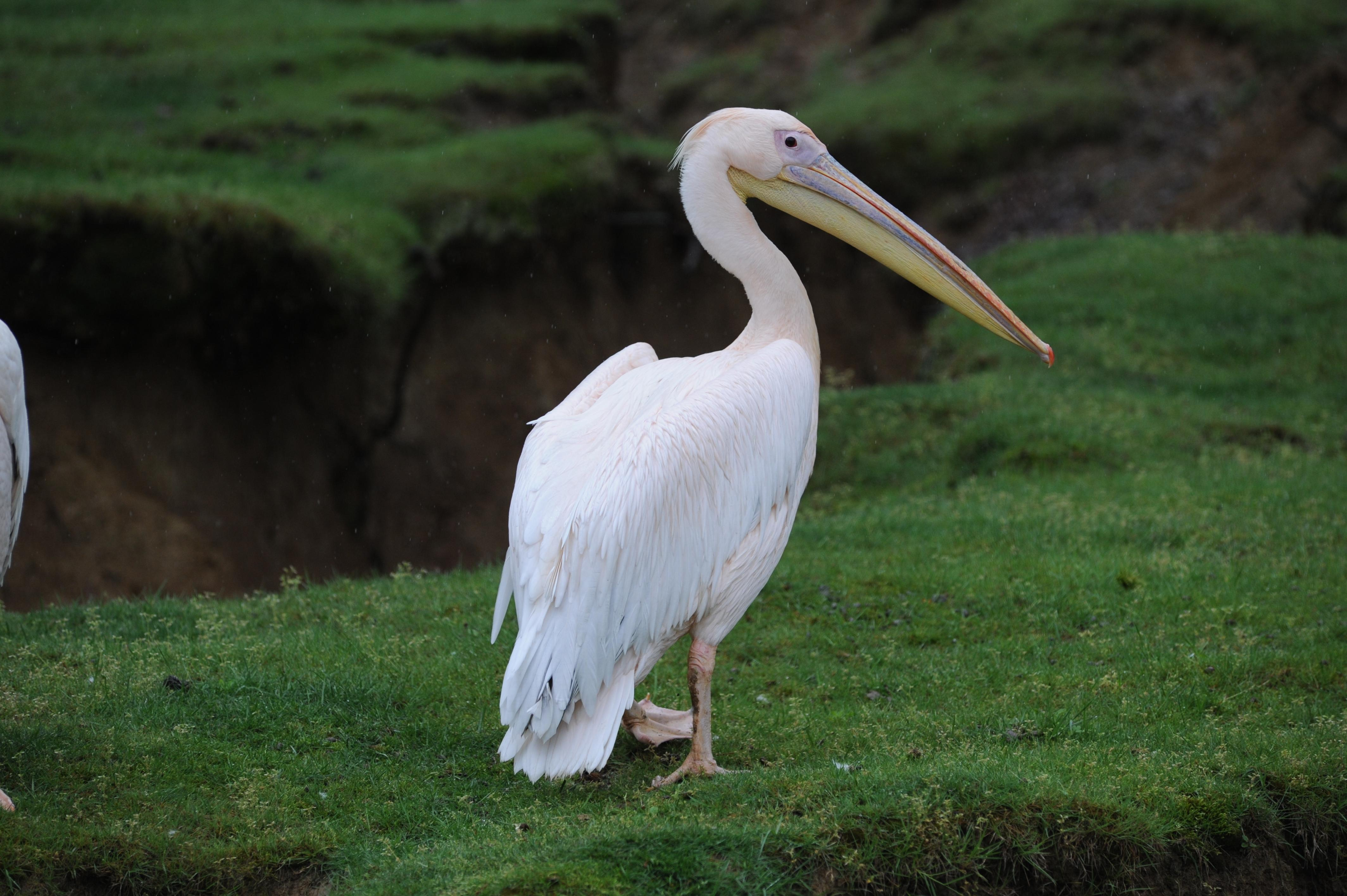
Great white pelican

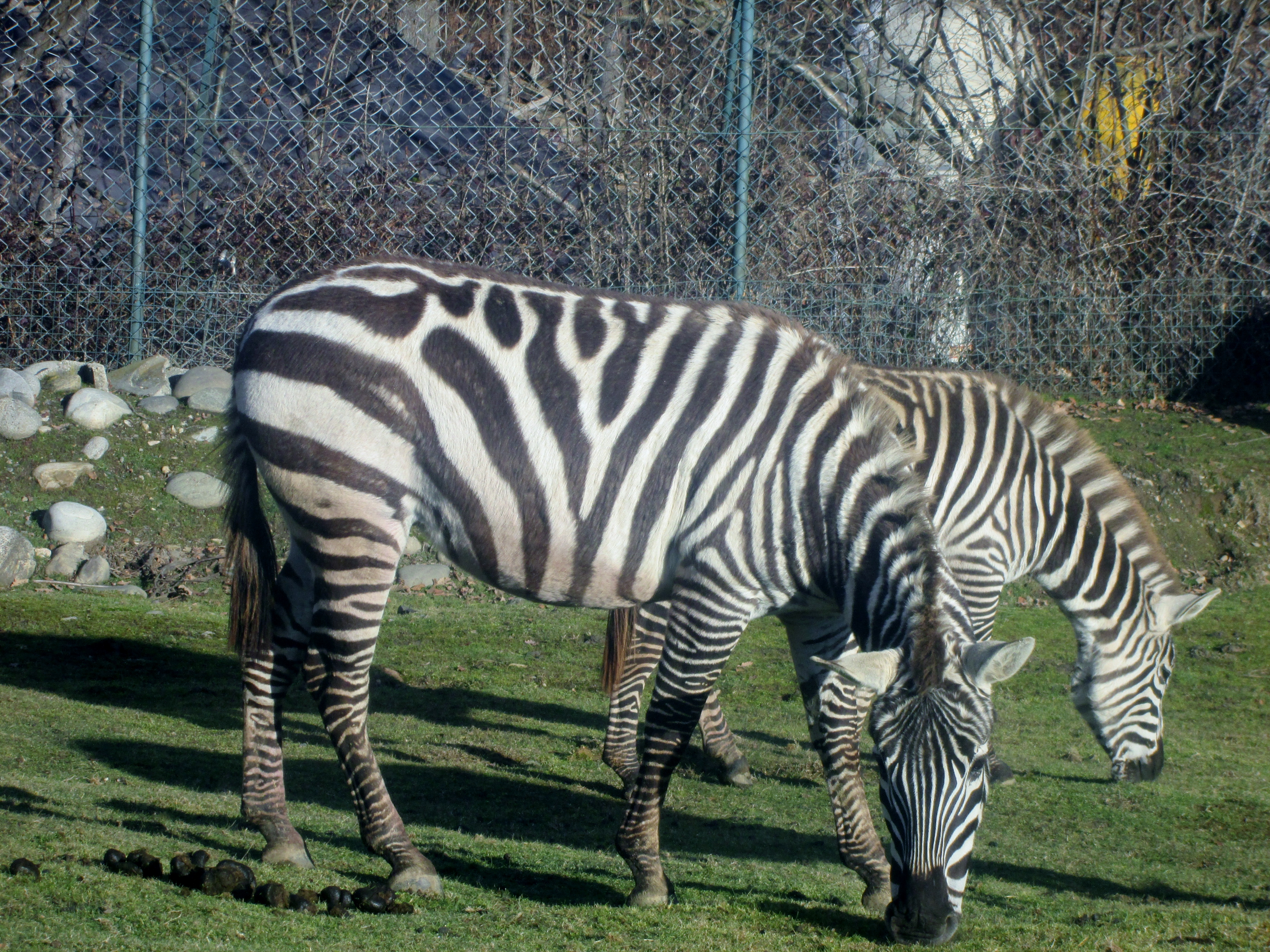
Zebras

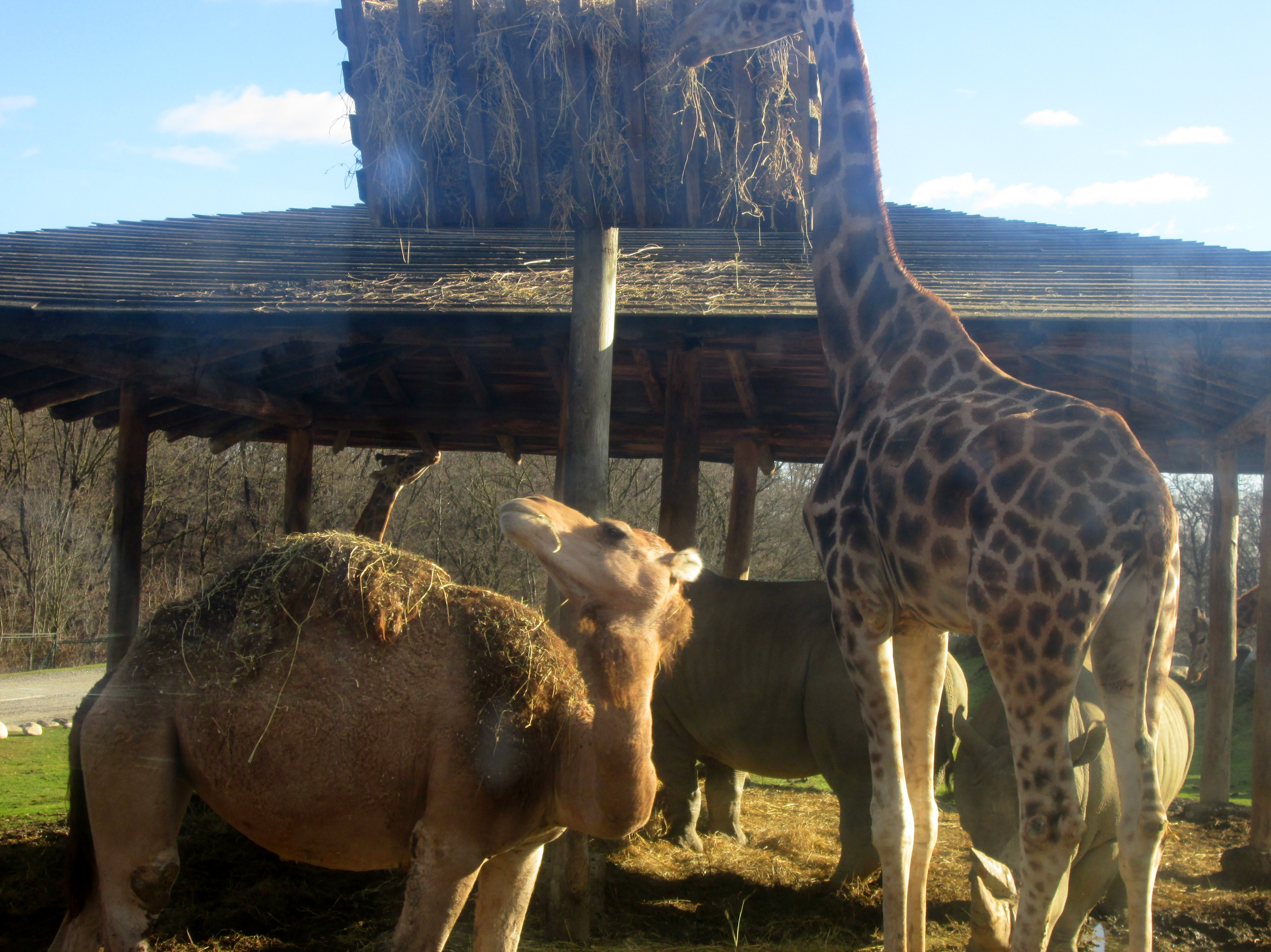
Dromedary camel, giraffe and white rhinoceroses

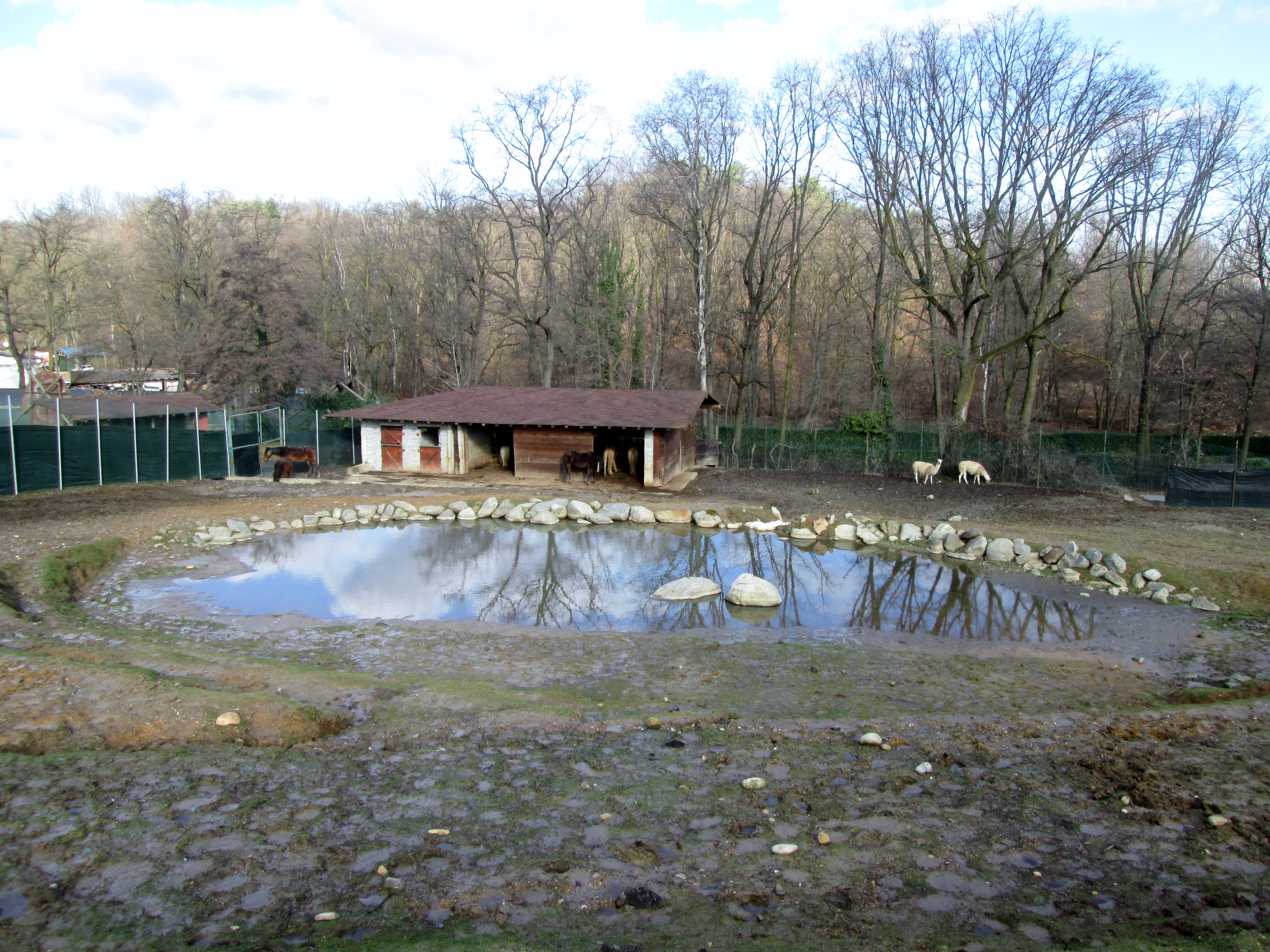
Horses and Llamas in their habitat

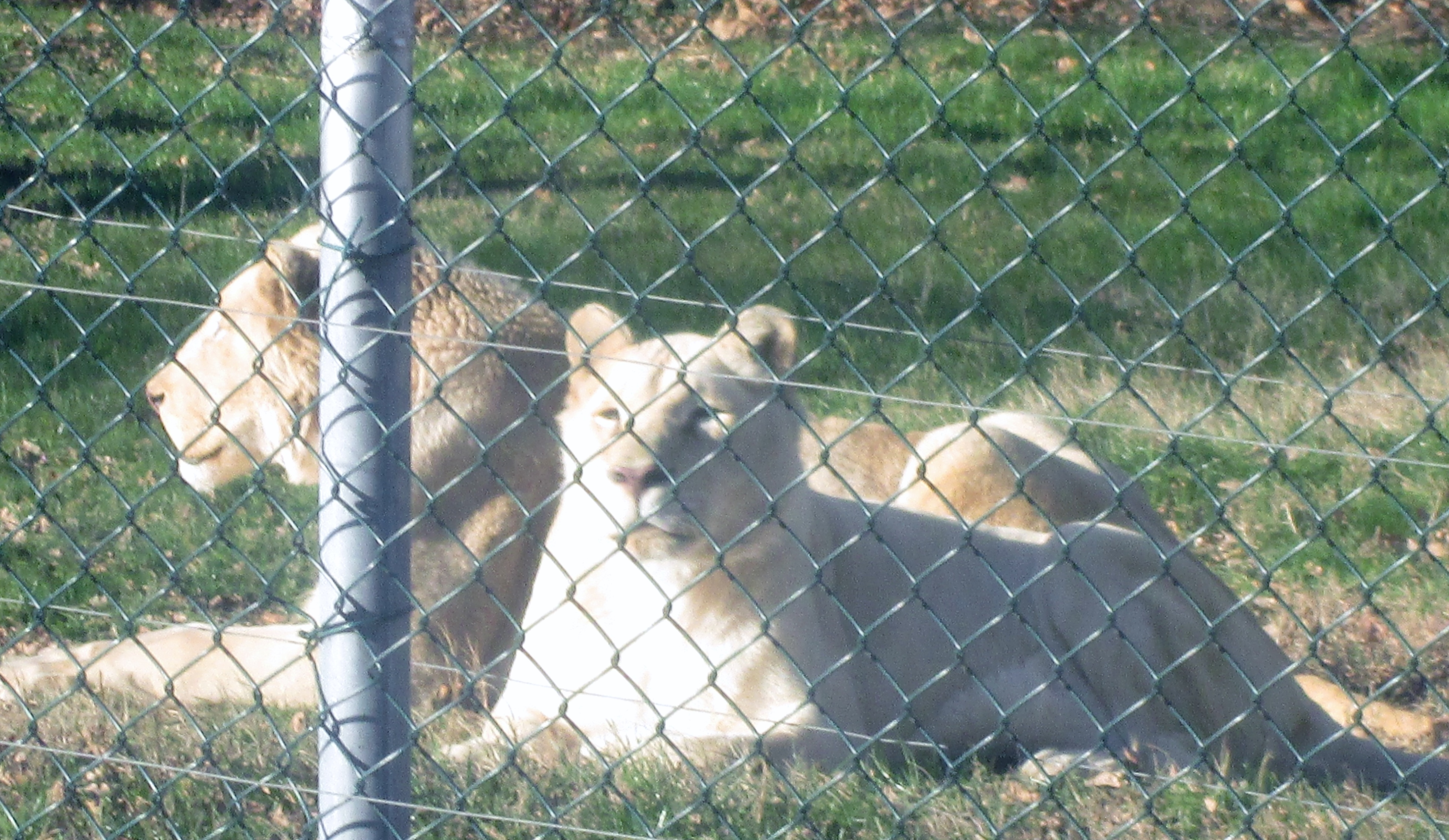
White lions

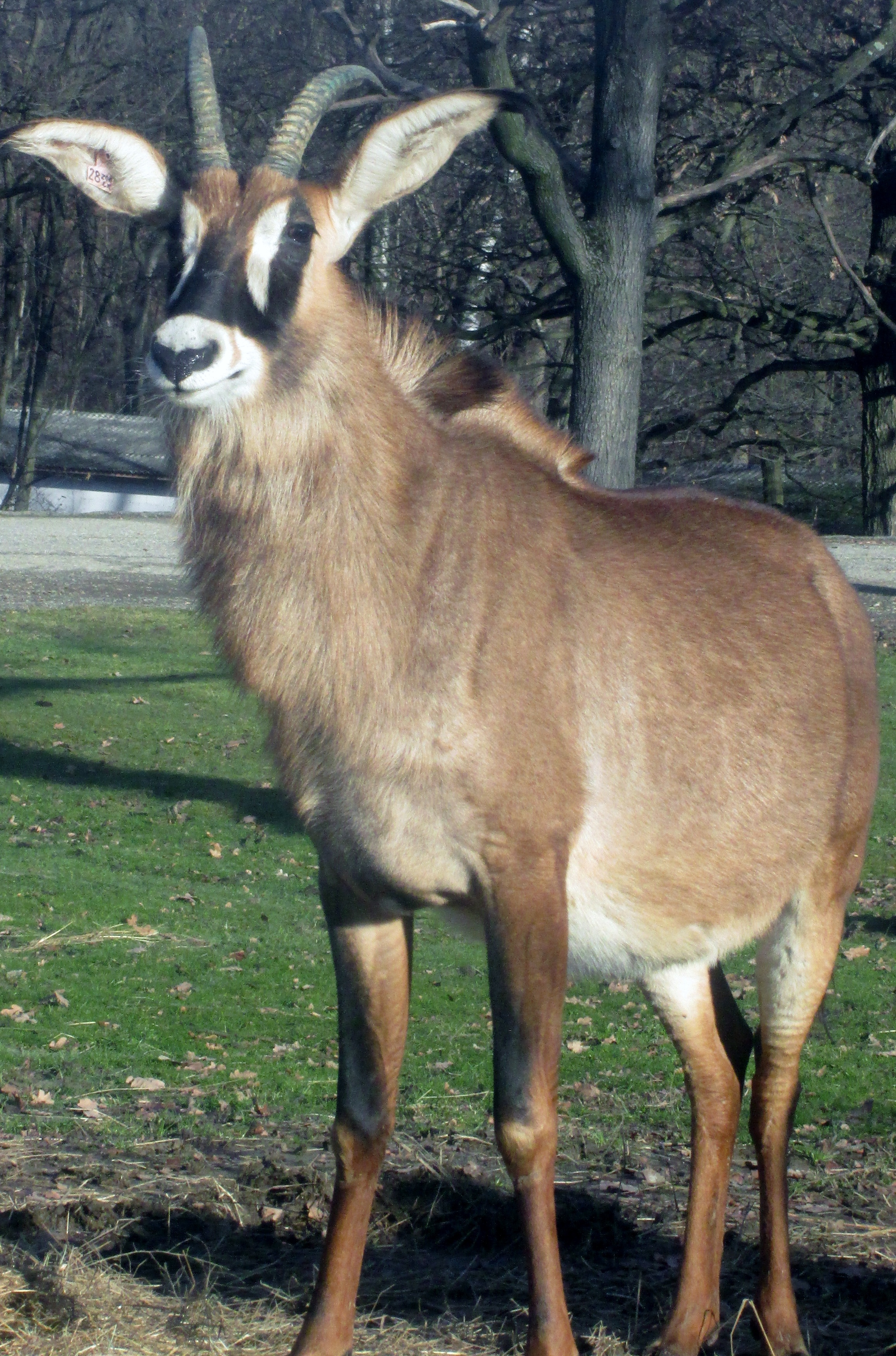
Roan antelope

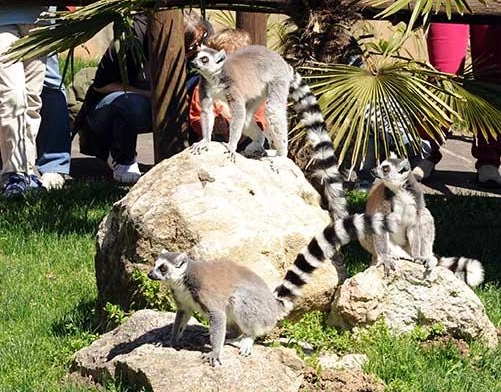
Ring-tailed lemurs

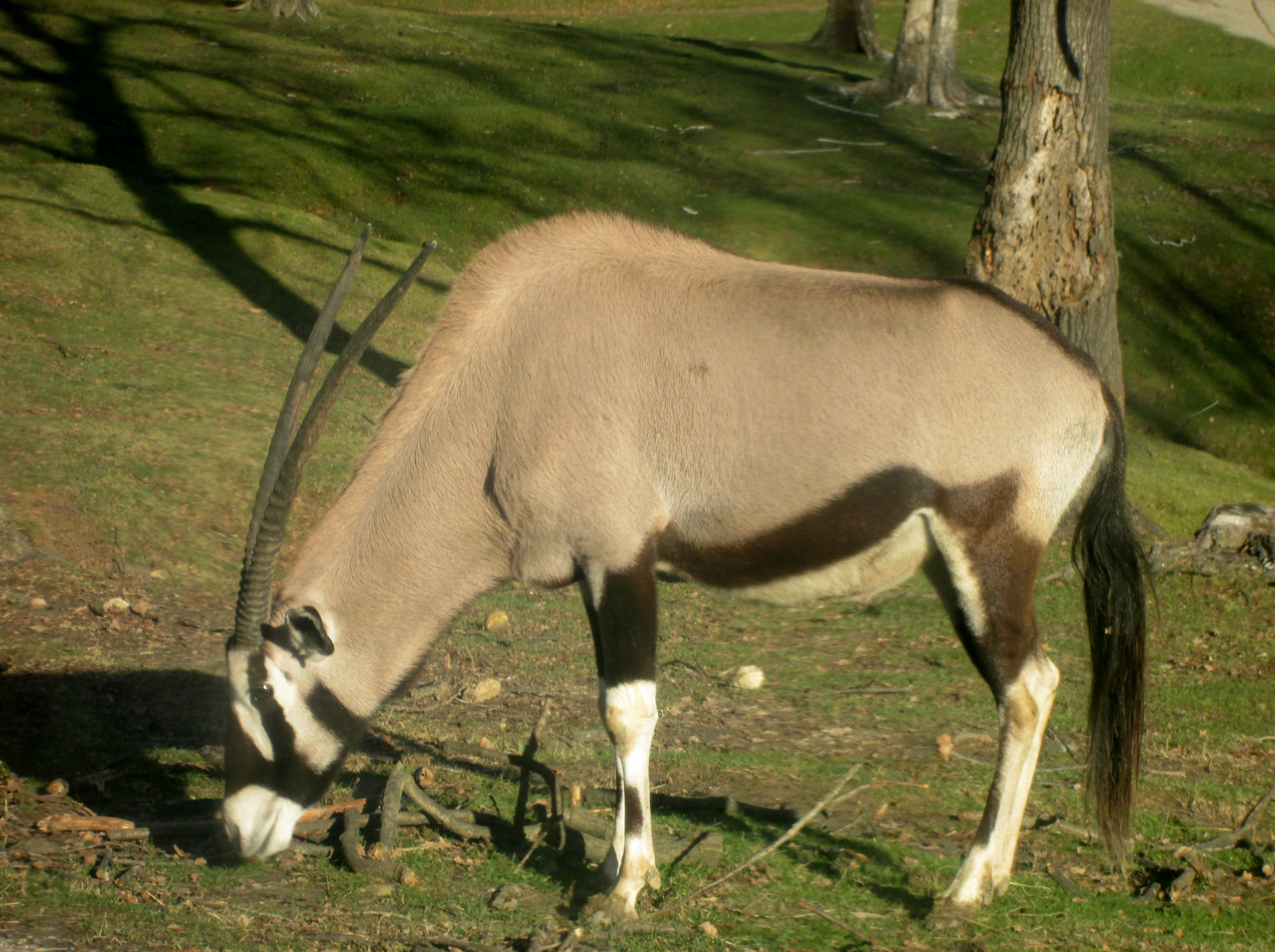
Gemsbok

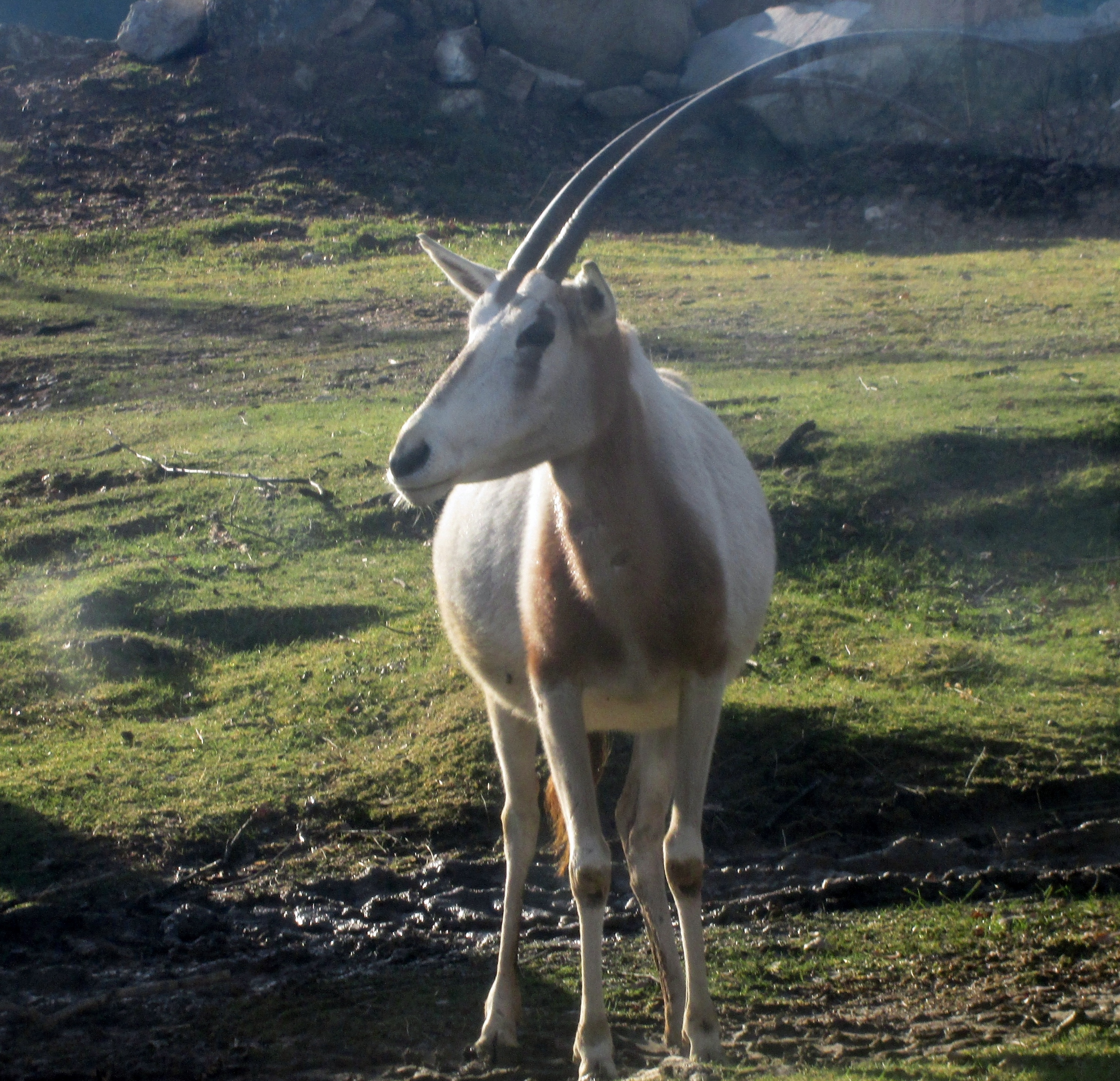
Scimitar oryx

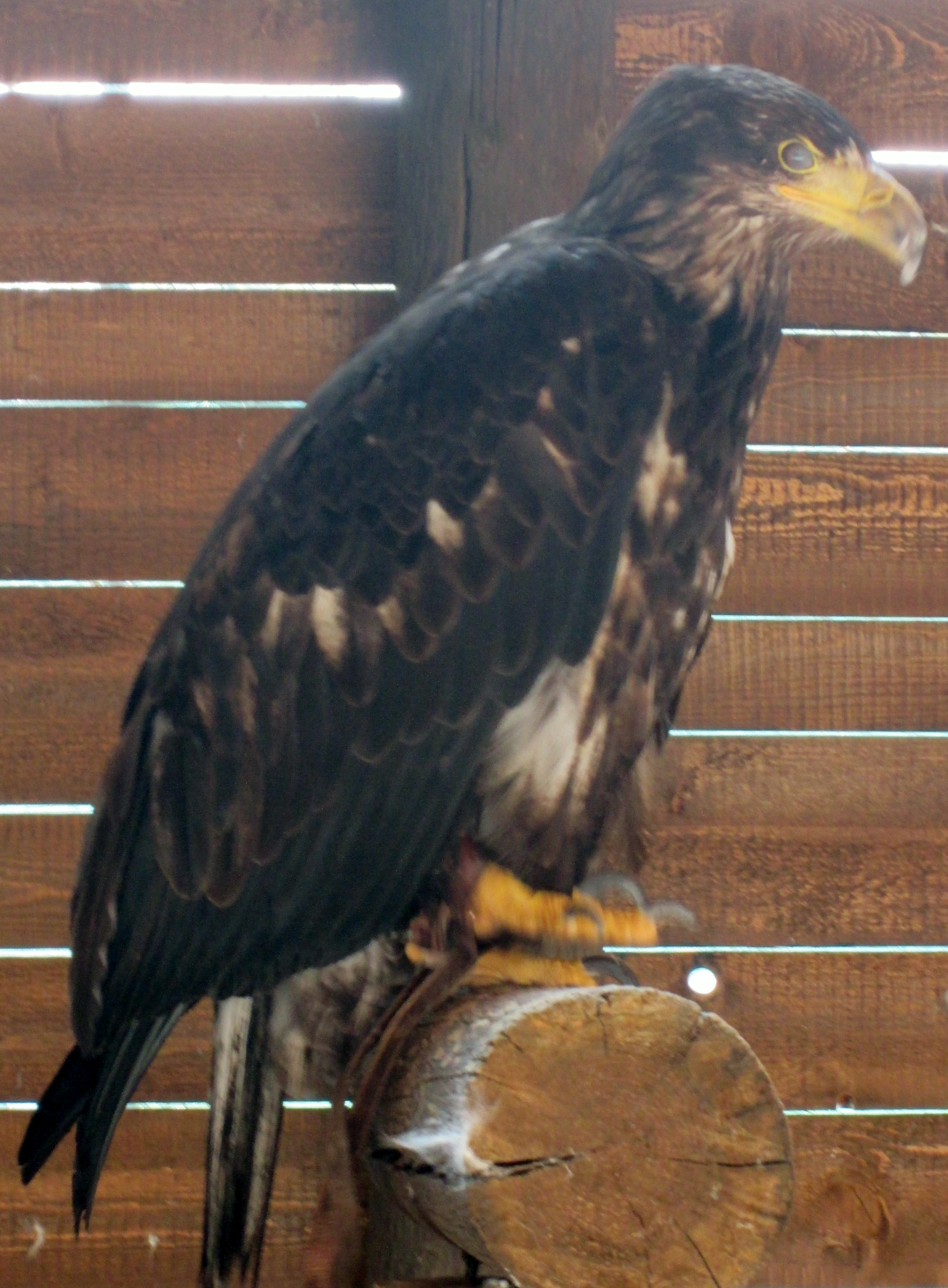
White-tailed eagle
