= Pelibüey =

Cuban breed of sheep

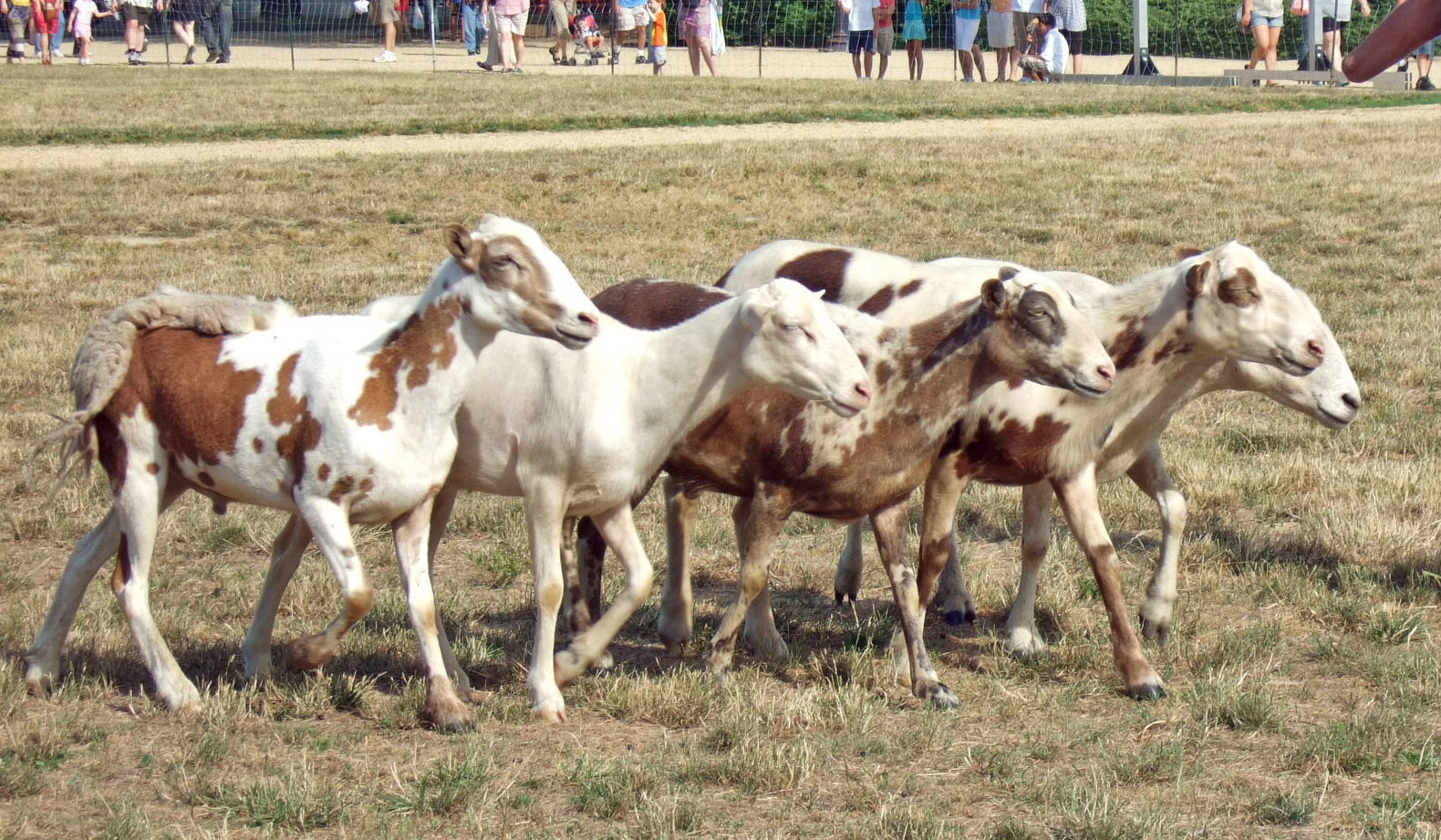
- at a sheepdog trial
- Conservation status: FAO (2007): not at risk; DAD-IS (2020): not at risk
- Other names: Pelibuey; Peliguey; Cubano Rojo; Carnero de Pelo de Buey; Cuban Hairy; Tabasco (in Mexico)
- Country of origin: Cuba
- Distribution: Cuba; Mexico; Caribbean area
- Type: American hair sheep
- Use: meat

Traits
- Weight: Male: average 47 kg; Female: average 37.5 kg
- Height: Male: average 65 cm; Female: average 62 cm
- Hair colour: variable, including red, tan, white, tan-and-white, black belly and black
- Horn status: hornless in both sexes

The Pelibüey or Spanish: Cubano Rojo is a Cuban breed of domestic sheep. It is found principally in Cuba, where it is the most numerous breed of sheep, but is also reared elsewhere in the Caribbean and in some coastal parts of Mexico. It is a hair sheep – its coat is of hair, not wool; this is a common adaptation to tropical environments. This likely derives at least in part from African breeds of sheep such as the West African Dwarf, and probable is related to other American breeds of African origin such as the Barbados Black Belly, the Roja Africana of Venezuela, and the Oveja Africana of Colombia.

It is raised primarily for meat.
