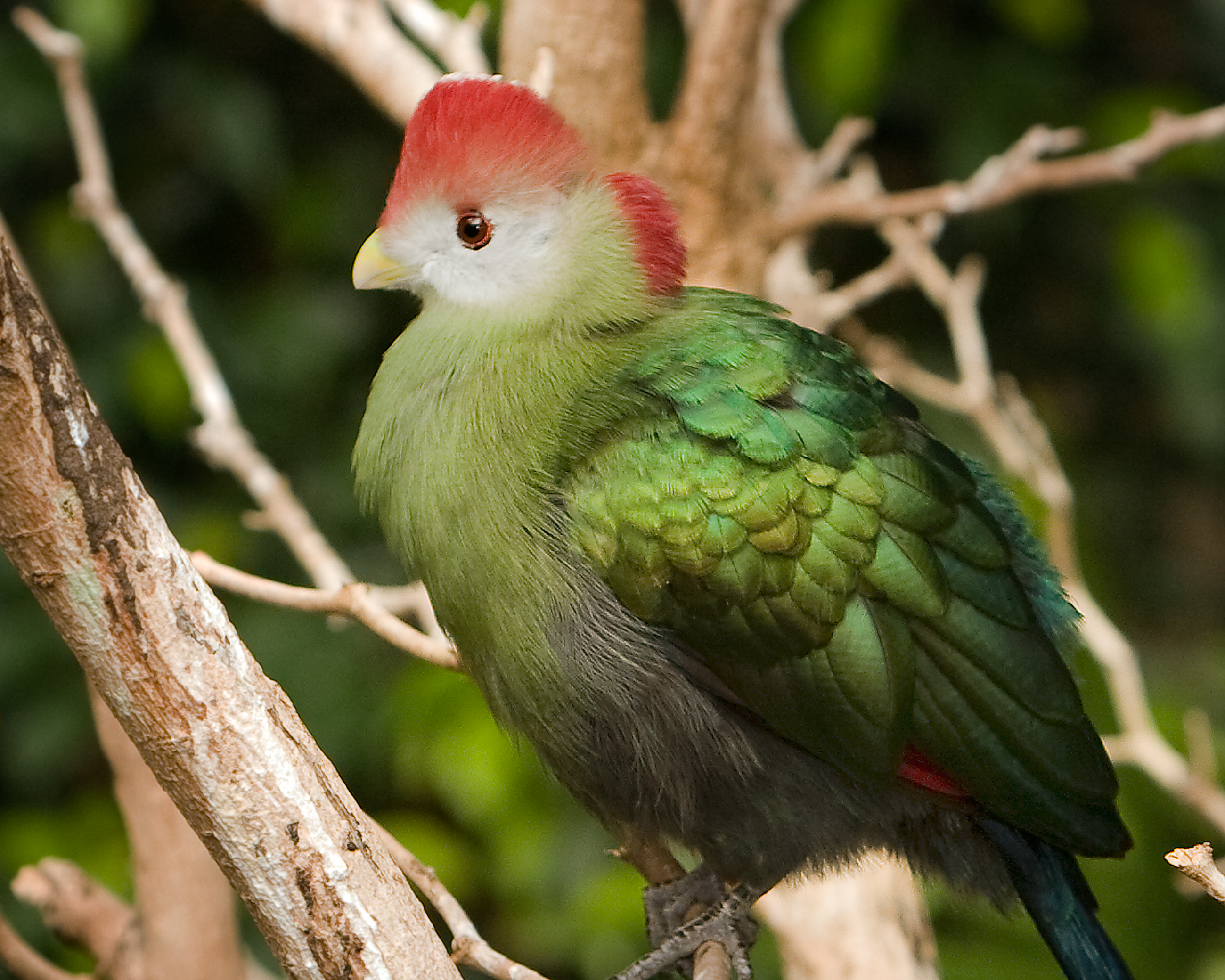
- Red-crested turaco, Niagara Falls Aviary, Canada

Conservation status
- Least Concern (IUCN 3.1)

Scientific classification
- Kingdom: Animalia
- Phylum: Chordata
- Class: Aves
- Order: Musophagiformes
- Family: Musophagidae
- Genus: Tauraco
- Species: T. erythrolophus

Binomial name
- Tauraco erythrolophus (Vieillot, 1819)
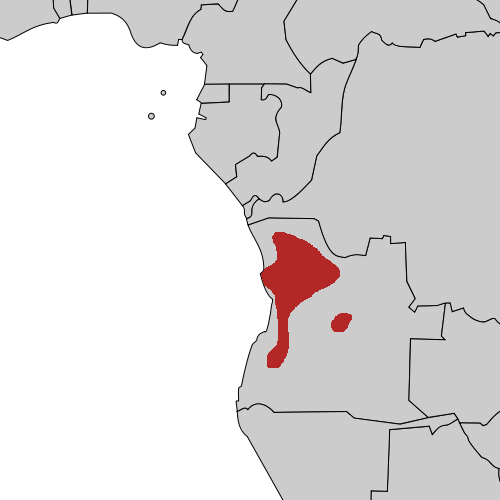
- Red-crested turaco Native Range

= Red-crested turaco =

Species of bird

The red-crested turaco (Tauraco erythrolophus) is a turaco, a group of African otidimorph birds. It is a frugivorous bird endemic to western Angola. Its call sounds somewhat like a jungle monkey.

== Description ==
The red-crested turaco weighs 210–325 g (7.4–11.5 oz) and is 45–50 cm (18–20 in) long. It looks similar to the Bannerman's turaco, but differs in crest and face colors. Both sexes are similar.

== Behaviour ==
They are seen in flocks of up to 30 birds, or in pairs. They usually remain in trees, only coming down to eat or drink. Their diet consists of insects, fruits, nuts, leaves, flowers, seeds, acacia, and figs. They are able to eat berries that are poisonous to humans.

== Voice ==
The red-crested turaco voice sounds like a deep barking call. The female's call is slightly higher-pitched than the male's. They are highly vocal, particularly at dawn.

== Reproduction ==
Red-crested turacos are monogamous. Both mates build a flimsy nest 5–20 m (16–66 ft) above the ground in dense foliage. After laying eggs, both birds incubate the eggs. The young leave the nest at 4–5 weeks old.

== As a national bird ==
The red-crested turaco is the national bird of Angola. It occurs quite commonly along the length of the Angolan escarpment and adjacent forested habitats.

== In media ==
A red-crested turaco was featured in 1998's The Parent Trap, as the bird pecking Meredith's chest shortly before she wakes up to discover Annie and Hallie have floated her camping mattress onto a lake. This scene of the film is set in Northern California, so the choice of this bird species is distinctly out of place.

== Gallery ==
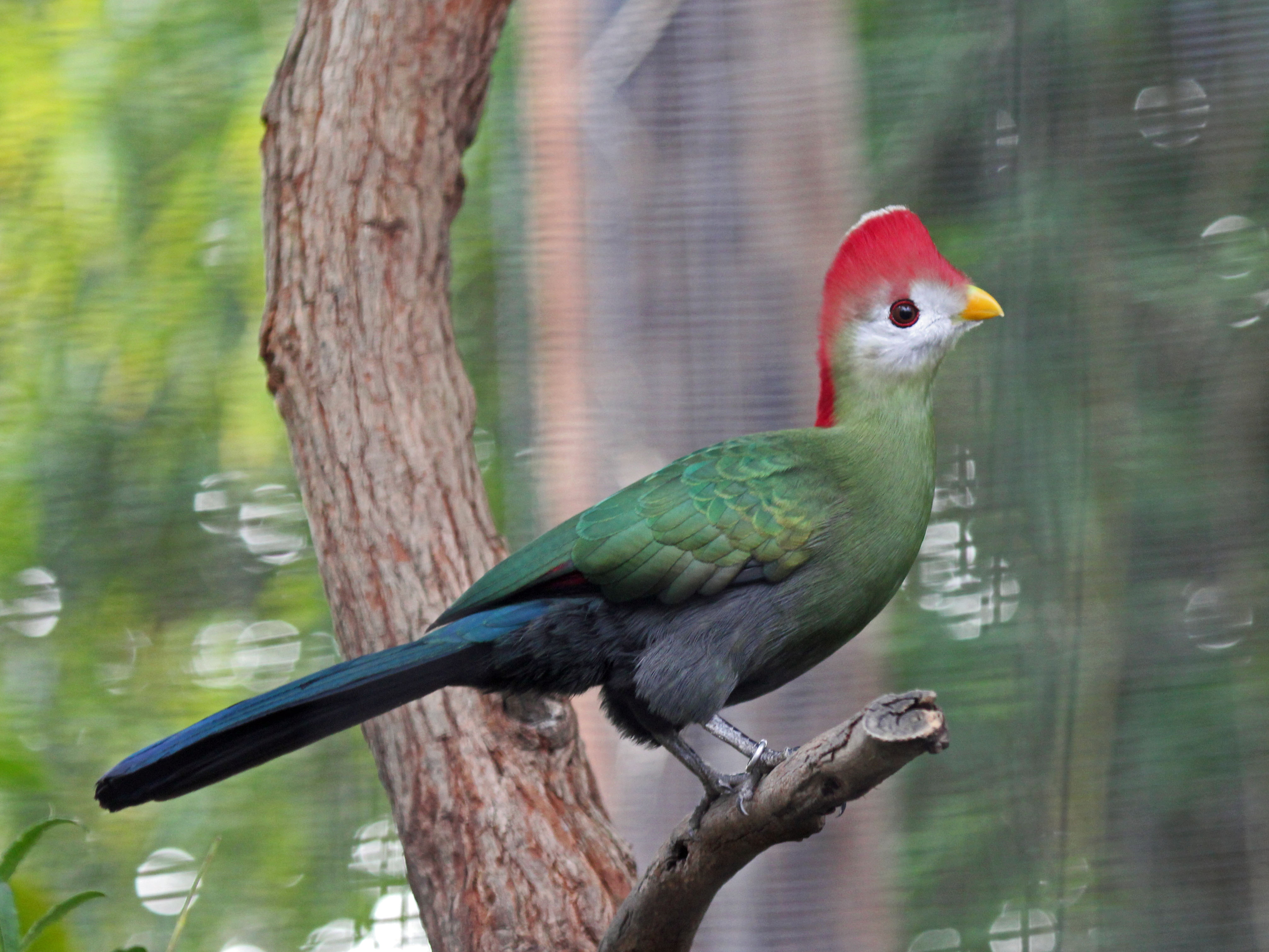
At San Diego Zoo, U.S.

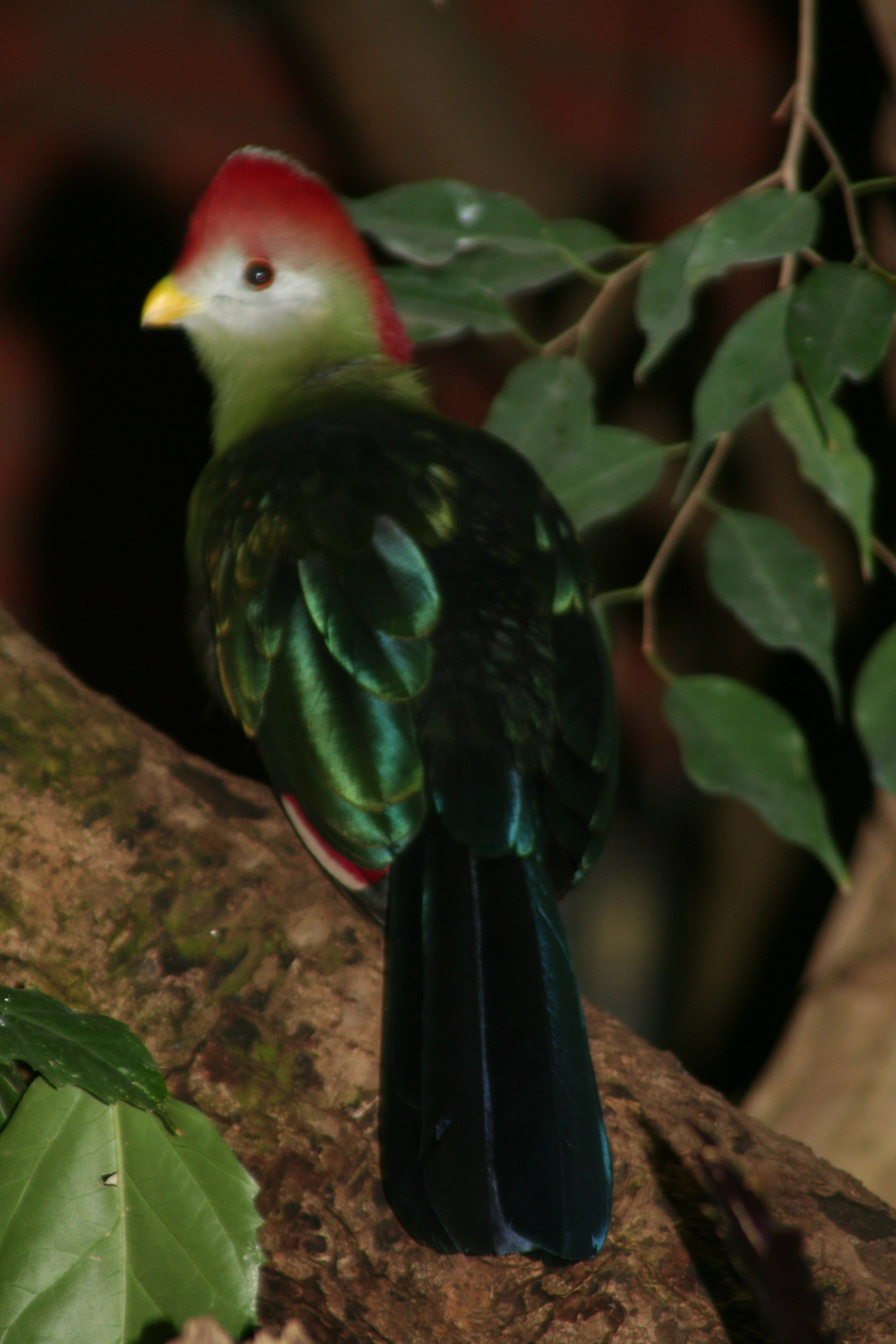
At Weltvogelpark Walsrode, Germany

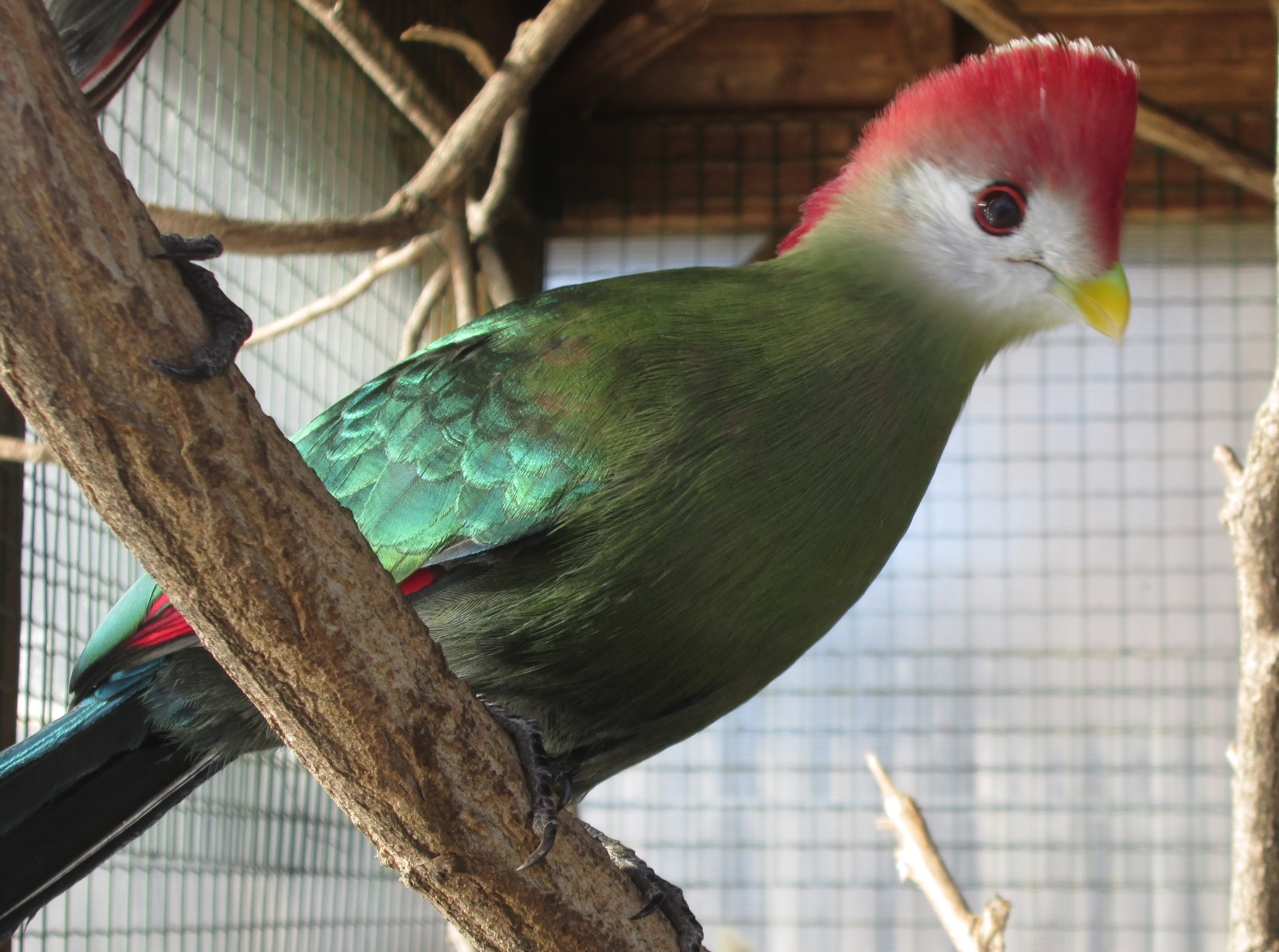
At Pombia Safari Park, Italy

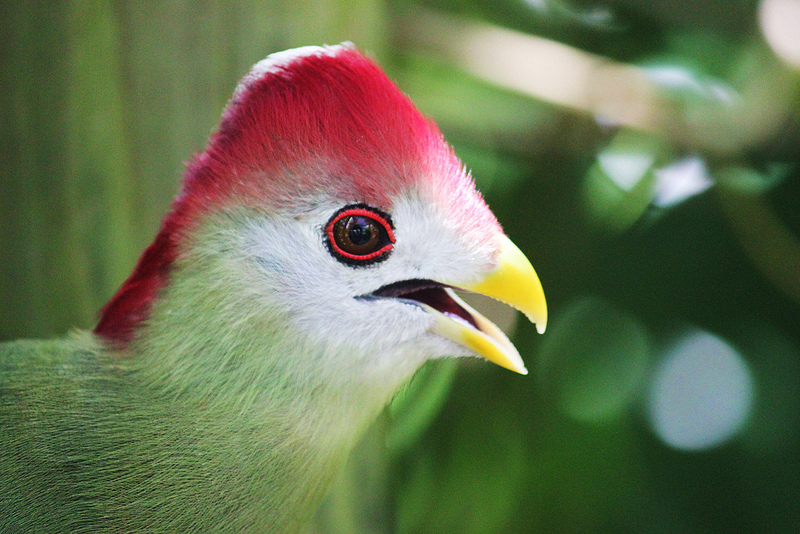
At Brevard Zoo, Florida

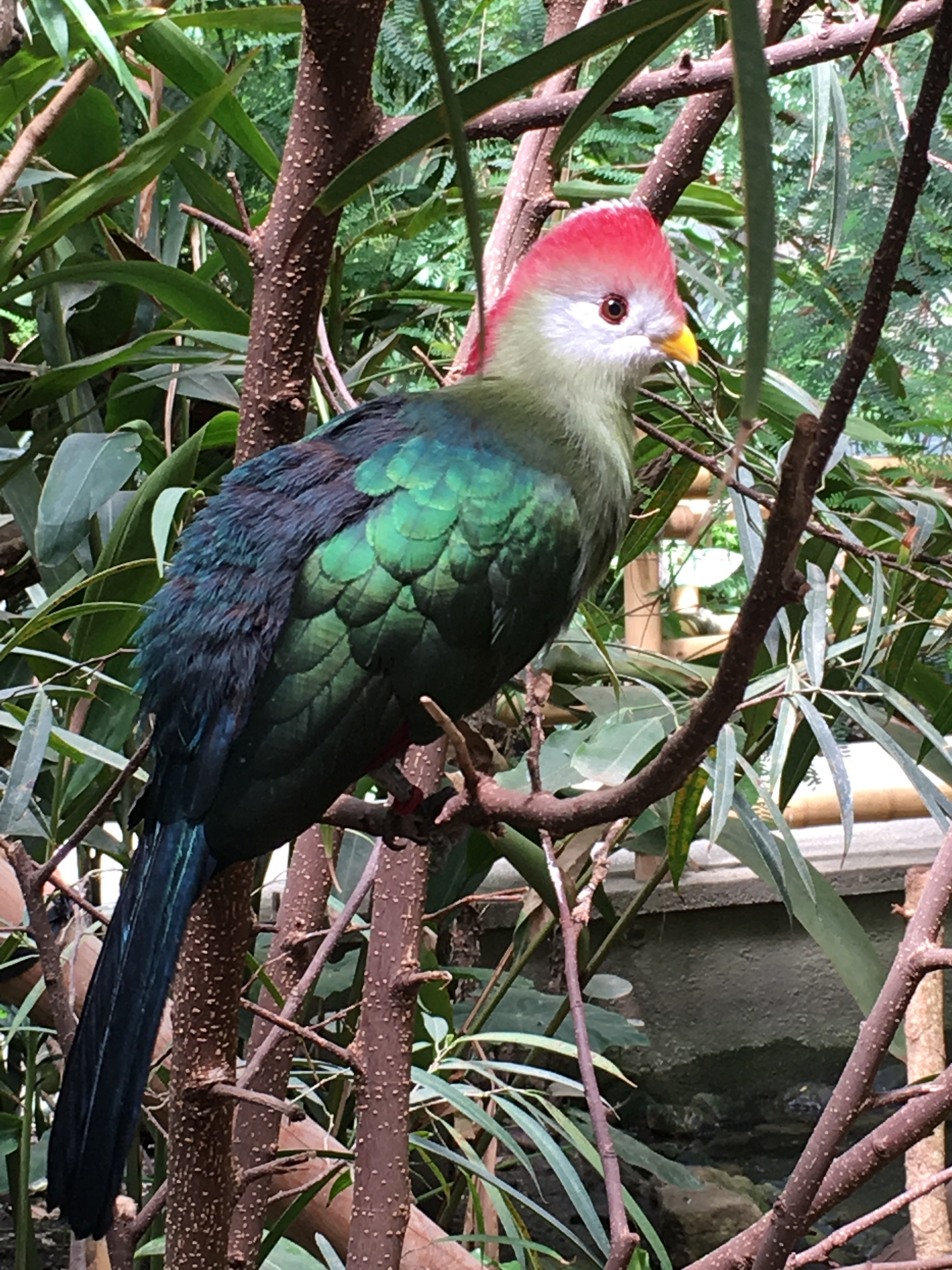
At Zoo Leipzig, Germany.
