= West African Dwarf sheep =

West, Central African breed of meat sheep

- Use: Meat

The West African Dwarf or Djallonké is an African breed or group of breeds of domestic sheep. It is the dominant breed of West and Central Africa. This breed is primarily raised for meat. The Cameroon or Cameroon Dwarf is a breed within this group.

== Characteristics ==
The West African Dwarf is generally white or piebald, the front half being black and the back half white. However, skewbald (tan on white) and the black belly pattern are found, and the Kirdi type are specially selected to be entirely black. Rams weigh approximately 37 kg (82 lb), have a well-developed throat ruff and are usually horned. The horns are wide at the base, curve backwards, outwards and then forwards again, with a maximum of one and a half coils. Ewes weigh about 25 kg (55 lb) and are usually polled (hornless), but may have slender short horns. The ears are short and pendulous, the neck is long and slender, the chest is deep, the legs are short, the back is long and dished, higher at the withers than at the tail-head, and the tail reaches the hocks.

On average, ewes produce 1.15 to 1.50 lambs per lambing. This breed grows slowly as evaluated in Nigeria in the last 1970s. The overall growth rates from 0–90, 91–150 and 151–350 days old were 74, 49 and 34 g/day, respectively. This breed is also highly tolerant of trypanosome. This breed is thought to go into oestrus throughout the year.

=== Cameroon sheep ===
The Cameroon is a hair sheep which it sheds yearly in the spring. Ewes can raise two lamb crops per year. Their most common color is brown with a black belly, head, and legs. Cameroon sheep are more likely to accept their newborn lamb than other sheep breeds do which makes them great mothers.

== Distribution ==
The West African Dwarf sheep is found in West Africa, its range extending from Senegal to Chad, Gabon, Cameroon, and the Republic of Congo. It is adapted for life in humid forested areas, subhumid areas, and savannahs. The Kirdi or Poulfouli is a wholly black variant found in northern Cameroon and southwestern Chad.

== See also ==
- Pelibuey (sheep)
- West African Dwarf goat
