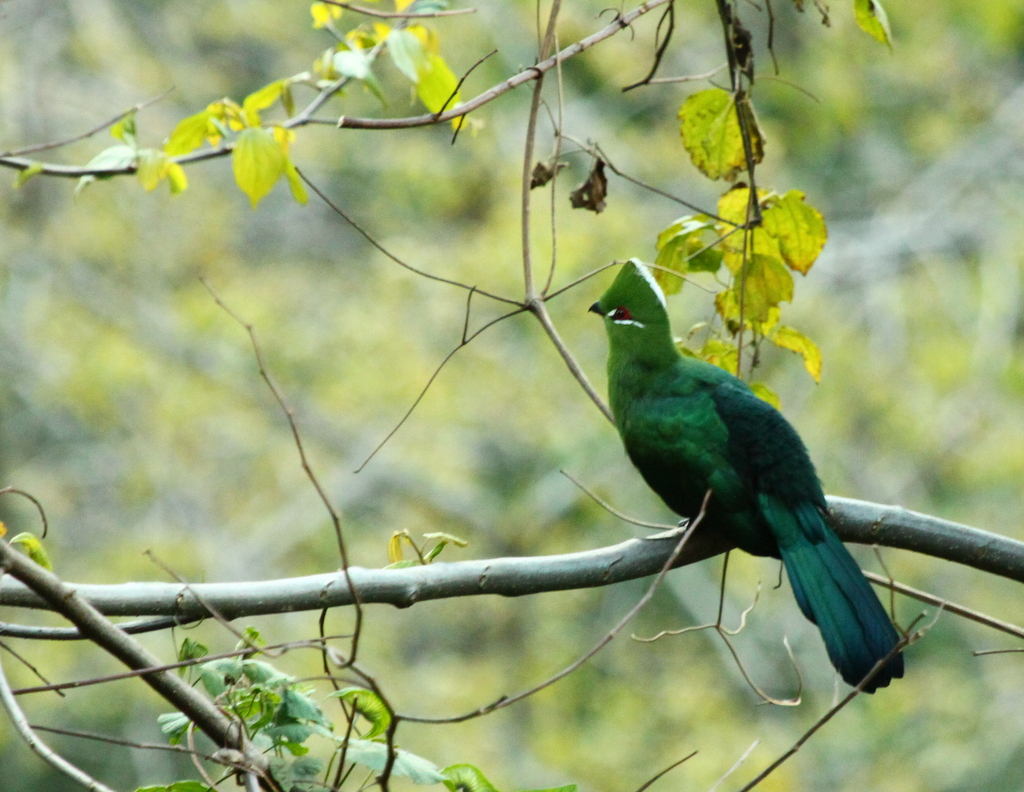

Conservation status
- Least Concern (IUCN 3.1)

Scientific classification
- Kingdom: Animalia
- Phylum: Chordata
- Class: Aves
- Order: Musophagiformes
- Family: Musophagidae
- Genus: Tauraco
- Species: T. schuettii

Binomial name
- Tauraco schuettii (Cabanis, 1879)
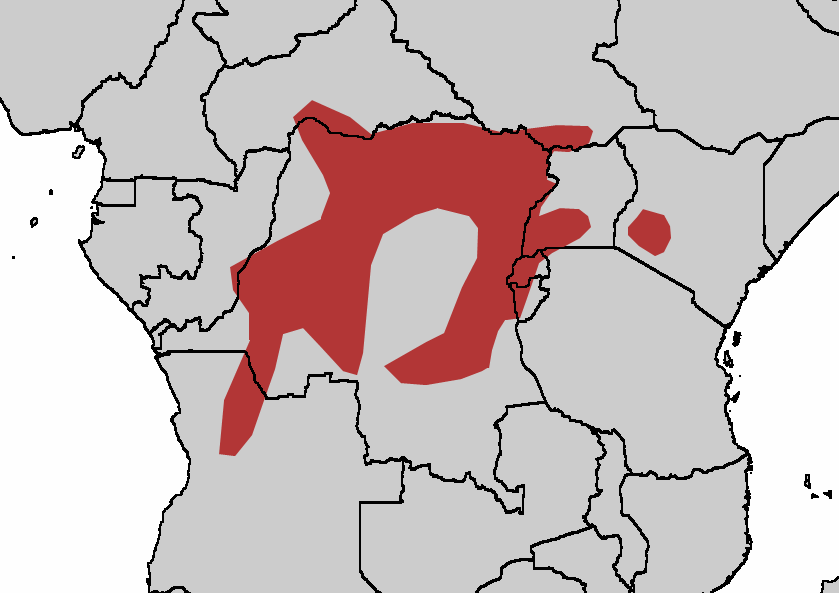
- Distribution of the black-billed turaco

Synonyms
- Tauraco schuetti

= Black-billed turaco =

Species of bird

The black-billed turaco (Tauraco schuettii) is a medium-sized turaco, an endemic family to sub-Saharan Africa. It is a resident breeder in the forests of central Africa, found in the Democratic Republic of Congo, Uganda, West Kenya, Burundi, Rwanda and South Sudan.

== Description ==
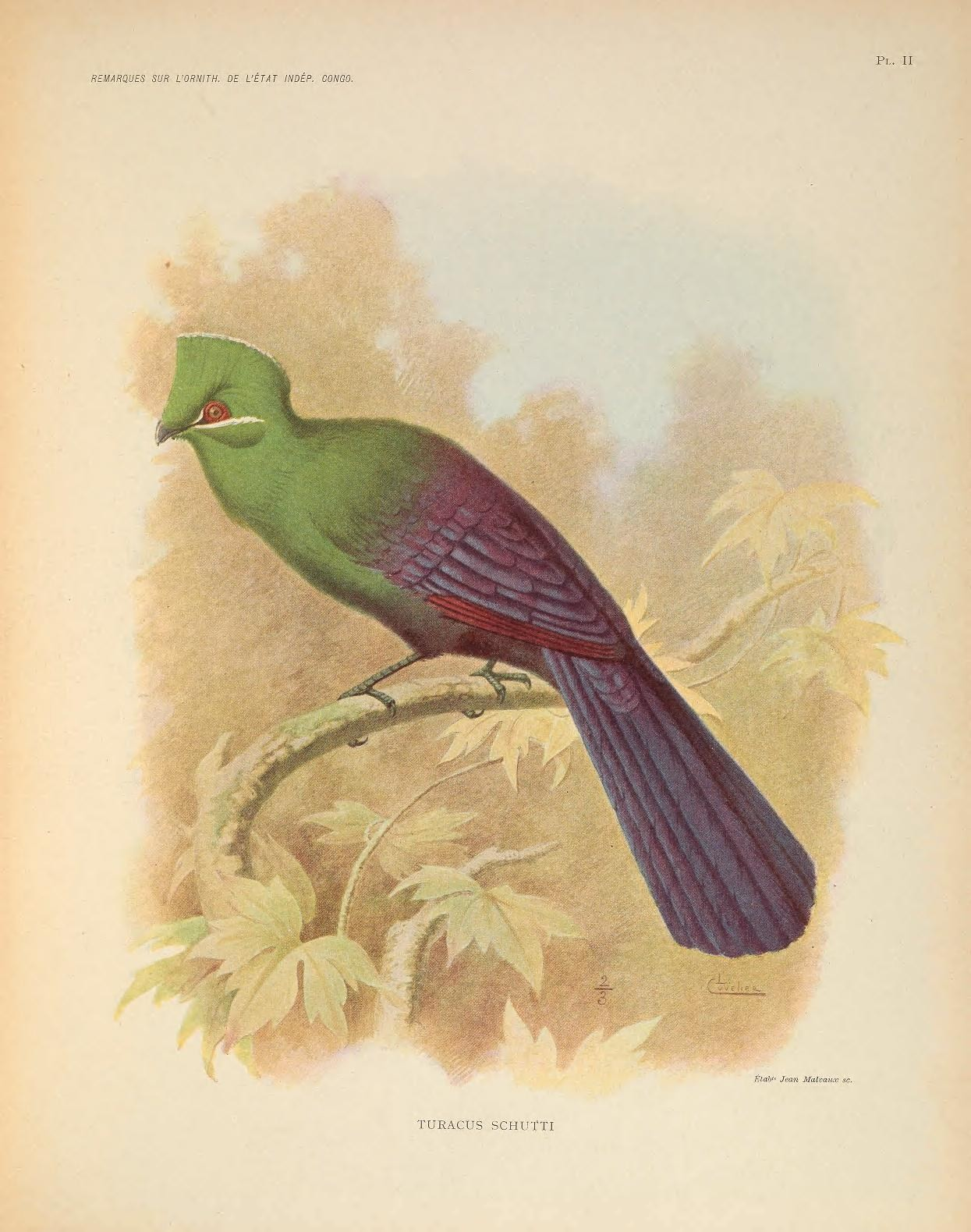
Pl. II Remarques sur l'ornithologie de l'État indépendant du Congo.

The bird is 40 cm (16 in) long; ranging in weight from 199–272 g (7.0–9.6 oz). Adult similar to green turaco, distinguished by small all-black bill and rounded whitish crest. It lays two eggs in a platform of twigs around 3 to 5 m (9.8 to 16.4 ft) above the ground. Both the male and female defend a territory and share incubation duties.

Its call is a distinctive feature of the forests of the Congo, a resonant kwah khaw kwah. In areas where its range overlaps with the Rwenzori turaco it will aggressively respond to the calls of that species.

It is a widespread species and is not threatened globally (CITES II).
