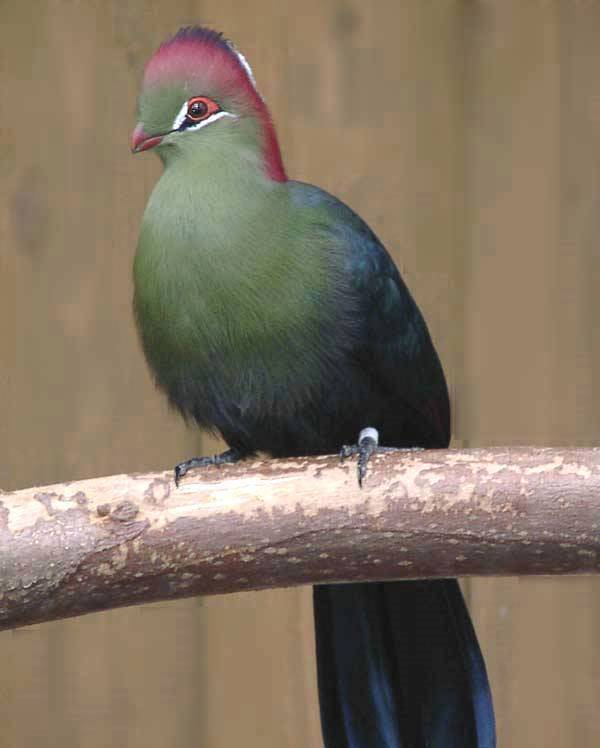
- Fischer's turaco (Tauraco fischeri)

Conservation status
- CITES Appendix II (CITES)

Scientific classification
- Domain: Eukaryota
- Kingdom: Animalia
- Phylum: Chordata
- Class: Aves
- Order: Musophagiformes
- Family: Musophagidae
- Subfamily: Musophaginae
- Genus: Tauraco; Kluk, 1779

Type species
- Cuculus persa (Guinea turaco) Linnaeus, 1758

Species
- See text

= Tauraco =

Genus of birds

Tauraco is a genus of turacos. It contains the "typical" or green turacos; though their plumage is not always green all over, the presence of significant amounts of turacoverdin-colored plumage generally sets Tauraco species apart from other Musophagidae. Indeed, as opposed to any other known birds, Tauraco turacos are the only living bird taxa that have any significant green pigment whatsoever, as the greens of many parrots etc. are due to structural color, not pigment. Their genus name was derived from a native West African name.

== Taxonomy ==
The genus Tauraco was introduced in 1779 by the Polish naturalist Jan Krzysztof Kluk. The type species was later designated as the Guinea turaco.

=== Species ===
The genus contains 13 species.

Genus Tauraco – Kluk, 1779 – thirteen species
Common name	Scientific name and subspecies	Range	Size and ecology	IUCN status and estimated population
Guinea turaco (also called green turaco)	Tauraco persa (Linnaeus, 1758) Three subspecies: T. p. buffoni (Vieillot, 1819); T. p. persa (Linnaeus, 1758); T. p. zenkeri Reichenow, 1896	West and Central Africa, ranging from Senegal east to DR Congo and south to northern Angola	Size: Habitat: Diet:	LC
Livingstone's turaco	Tauraco livingstonii (Reichenow, 1891)	Burundi, and is besides found from southern Tanzania to eastern and southern Malawi, eastern Zimbabwe, widely in Mozambique and along the subtropical coast of South Africa.	Size: Habitat: Diet:	LC
Schalow's turaco	Tauraco schalowi (Reichenow, 1891)	Zambia, central Angola, the southern DRC, and the uplands of southern Kenya, northern and western Tanzania and western Malawi	Size: Habitat: Diet:	LC
Knysna turaco	Tauraco corythaix (Wagler, 1827)	South Africa	Size: Habitat: Diet:	LC
Black-billed turaco	Tauraco schuettii (Cabanis, 1879)	Democratic Republic of Congo, Uganda, West Kenya, Burundi, Rwanda and South Sudan.	Size: Habitat: Diet:	LC
Ross's turaco	Tauraco rossae (Gould, 1852)	Cameroon to South Sudan and western Kenya south to Angola and Botswana	Size: Habitat: Diet:	LC
Fischer's turaco	Tauraco fischeri (Reichenow, 1878)	Kenya, Somalia, and Tanzania	Size: Habitat: Diet:	NT
Yellow-billed turaco	Tauraco macrorhynchus (Fraser, 1839)	Angola, Cameroon, Republic of the Congo, Democratic Republic of the Congo, Ivory Coast, Equatorial Guinea, Gabon, Ghana, Guinea, Liberia, Nigeria, and Sierra Leone	Size: Habitat: Diet:	LC
Hartlaub's turaco	Tauraco hartlaubi (Fischer & Reichenow, 1884)	Kenya, Tanzania, and Uganda	Size: Habitat: Diet:	LC
Violet turaco	Tauraco violaceus (Isert, 1788)	Senegal and Gambia to Chad and Central African Republic	Size: Habitat: Diet:	LC
White-crested turaco	Tauraco leucolophus (Heuglin, 1855)	eastern Nigeria and western Kenya	Size: Habitat: Diet:	LC
Red-crested turaco	Tauraco erythrolophus (Vieillot, 1819)	Angola	Size: Habitat: Diet:	LC
Bannerman's turaco	Tauraco bannermani (Bates, GL, 1923)	Cameroon	Size: Habitat: Diet:	EN
