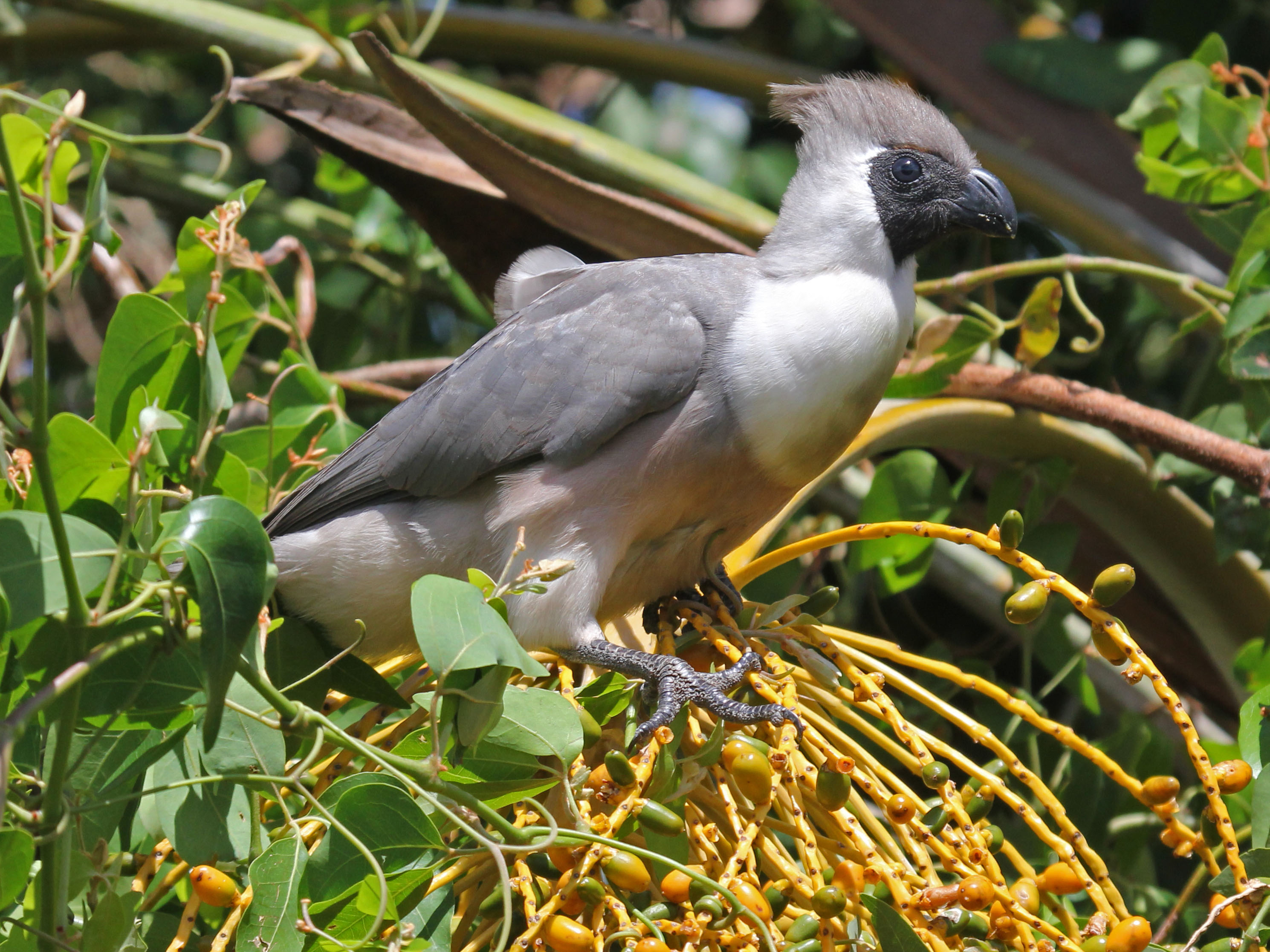
- Bare-faced go-away-bird in Kenya Call recorded in the Masai Mara Game Reserve, Kenya

Conservation status
- Least Concern (IUCN 3.1)

Scientific classification
- Kingdom: Animalia
- Phylum: Chordata
- Class: Aves
- Order: Musophagiformes
- Family: Musophagidae
- Genus: Crinifer
- Species: C. personatus

Binomial name
- Crinifer personatus (Rüppell, 1842)

Synonyms
- Corythaixoides personatus (Rüppell,1842)

= Bare-faced go-away-bird =

Species of bird

The bare-faced go-away-bird (Crinifer personatus) is a species of bird in the family Musophagidae which is native to the eastern Afrotropics. It is named for its distinctive and uniquely bare, black face.

== Taxonomy ==
The bare-faced go-away-bird was described in 1842 by the German naturalist Eduard Rüppell based on a specimen collected in Abyssinia (Ethiopia). He coined the binomial name Chizærhis personata. The specific epithet is from Latin personatus meaning "masked" (from persona meaning "mask"). The bare-faced go-away-bird was formerly placed in the genus Corythaixoides but based on a molecular phylogenetic study published in 2020, it was moved to the genus Crinifer.

Two geographically isolated races are recognised:

- C. p. personatus (Rüppell, 1842) – Ethiopian Rift Valley

Description: More extensive green breast plumage, underside of wings and tail greenish, face with minute brown plumes

- C. p. leopoldi (Shelley, 1881) – south Uganda, southwest Kenya and Tanzania to Malawi and Zambia

Description: Face bare and black, less extensive green breast plumage

== Description ==
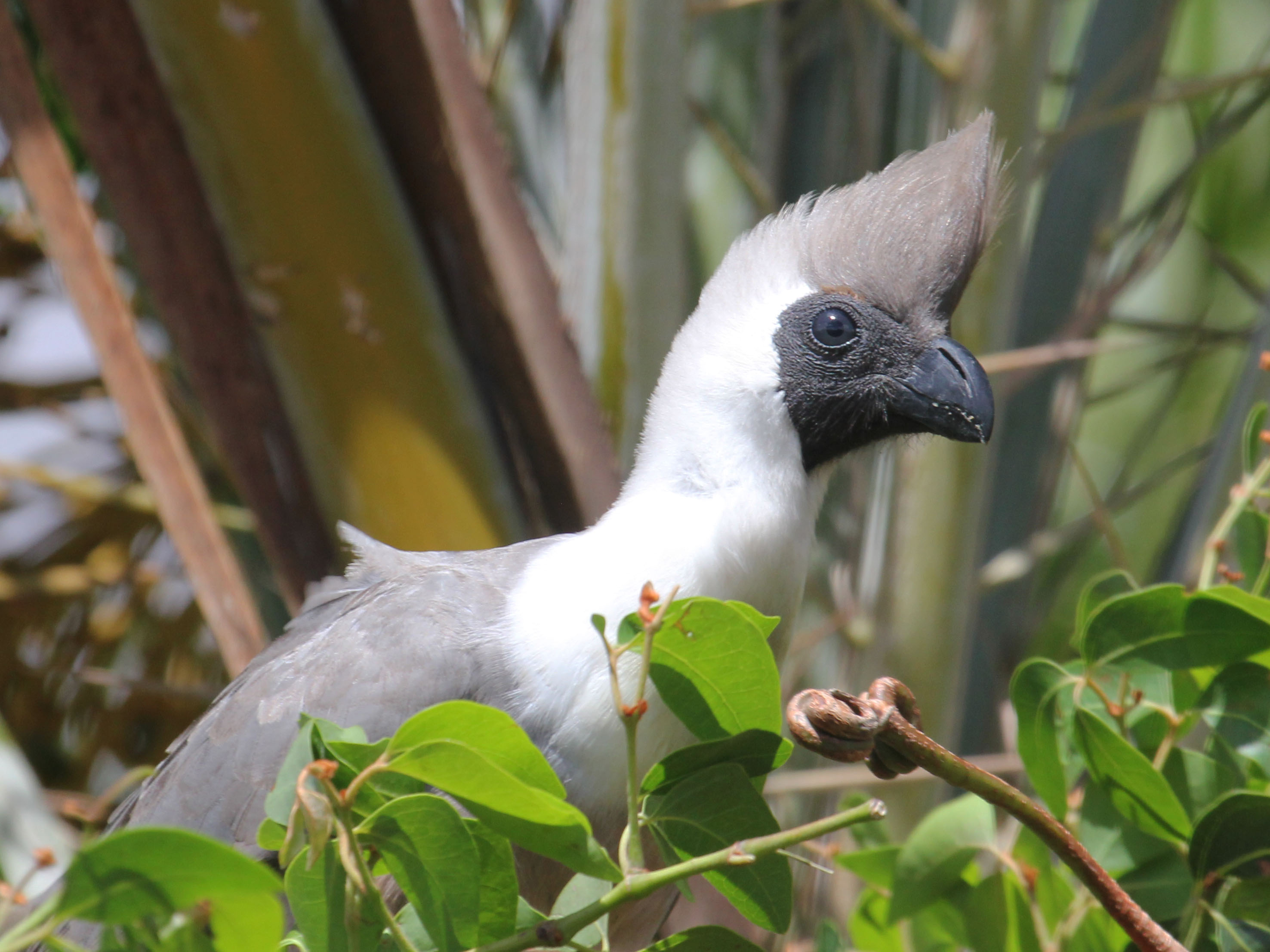
C. p. leopoldi in Kenya

The sexes are similar, other than the female's green beak. It is 48 cm (19 in) long beak to tail, and weighs approximately 210 to 300 grams. Its call is a double or repetitive kow-kow.

== Distribution and habitat ==
The bare-faced go-away-bird is found in two disjunct areas in Africa: one in Ethiopia, and the other in Burundi, DRC, Kenya, Malawi, Rwanda, Tanzania, Uganda and Zambia. It occurs in open woodland, thickets and in cultivation with scattered trees. It may be found at altitudes of up to 1,400 metres, but at Loita up to 2,200 metres in scattered cedar, acacia and evergreen scrub.

== Behaviour and ecology ==
The bare-faced go-away-bird is a noisy and restless species, that moves about singly or in groups.

=== Food and feeding ===
These birds primarily eat fruits, leaf buds, and seeds.

=== Breeding ===
Like other Turacos, the bare-faced go-away-bird lays two to three greenish-white eggs each mating season. Nests are often built in tall acacia trees.
