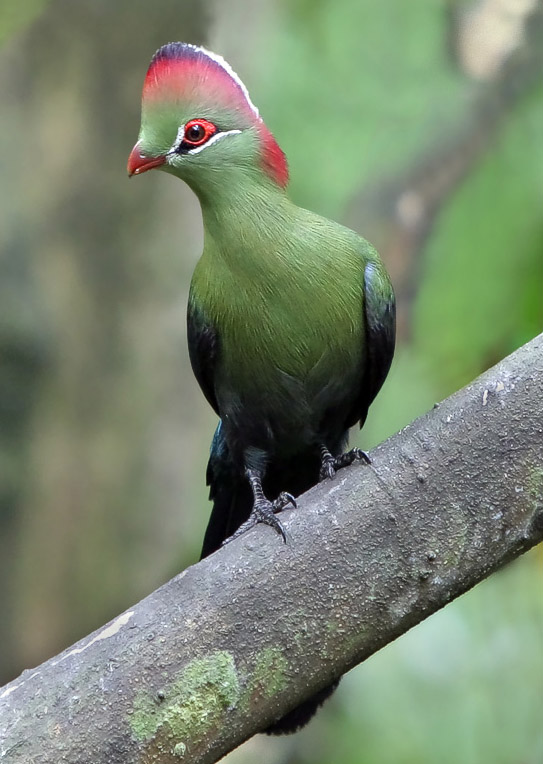
- At London Zoo, England

Conservation status
- Near Threatened (IUCN 3.1)

Scientific classification
- Kingdom: Animalia
- Phylum: Chordata
- Class: Aves
- Order: Musophagiformes
- Family: Musophagidae
- Genus: Tauraco
- Species: T. fischeri

Binomial name
- Tauraco fischeri (Reichenow, 1878)
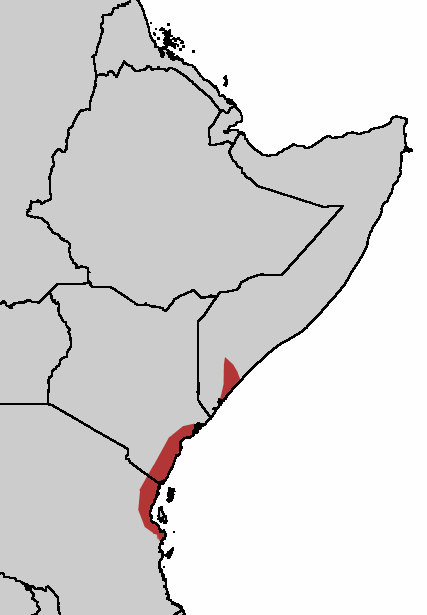
- native range

= Fischer's turaco =

Species of bird

Fischer's turaco (Tauraco fischeri) is a species of bird in the family Musophagidae. It is found in Coastal East Africa, including Kenya, Somalia, and Tanzania. Its natural habitats are subtropical or tropical moist lowland forest, subtropical or tropical moist montane forest, and arable land. It is threatened by habitat loss and trapping for the wildlife trade.

== Name ==
The common name and scientific name of this bird commemorate the 19th century German explorer of East Africa Gustav Fischer. This bird is also known as East African red-crested lourie.

== Description ==
Measurements:

- Length: 16 in (40 cm)
- Weight: males 8.11-9.49 oz (230-269 g); females 8.01-9.98 oz (227-283 g)

These green-bodied turacos have a white-tipped reddish crest, a black belly, and red primaries. They also feature green-blue wings and a dark blue-green tail.

The red skin around their eyes is margined in front by a white line that extends to its bright red bill, and below by a small black patch also bordered by a white line that extends to below its ear-coverts. Their white eye stripes and red orbital skin help to distinguish them from the more common red-crested turaco.

== Call ==
The song of the Fischer's turaco is described as a series of loud growls where the rising notes commence slowly and progress as a series of up to 12 identical notes.

== Distribution and habitat ==
The Fischer's turaco inhabits coastal and riverine forest and woodland in Coastal East Africa, specifically in Kenya, north-eastern Tanzania, and southern Somalia. This species lives in forest thickets, but does favor the canopy and sub-canopy of mature fruiting trees. They are common in their limited range, but are more often heard than seen because they travel alone or in pairs, which makes them hard to spot.

== Diet ==
This bird eats mainly fruits (especially figs and berries), but also eats flower buds, young leaf shoots, and insects.

== Conservation ==
The population of Fischer's turacos is decreasing, with the current number of mature individuals estimated to be 1,500 - 7,000. This species is currently protected by the United Nations' Convention on International Trade in Endangered Species of Wild Fauna and Flora (CITIES) Appendix II. In Somalia, Notification to the Parties No. 2004/055 was enacted in 2019, which suspended all commercial trade of the species. In 2025 a consignment of 38 trafficked birds was intercepted in Zambia.

== Breeding ==
Once bonded, the Fischer's turaco makes a loose, platform stick nest in the tree canopy. Both males and females help build the nest and incubate the eggs. A typical clutch consists of 2 white eggs that feature an incubation period of 22–23 days. Chicks fledge from the nest between 4–5 weeks, but are not able to fly until about 6 weeks of age.
