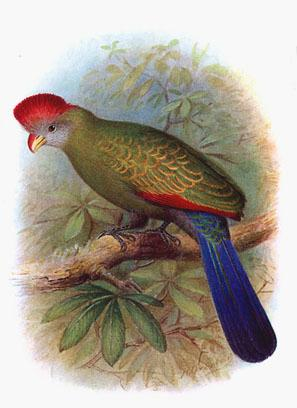

Conservation status
- Near Threatened (IUCN 3.1)

Scientific classification
- Kingdom: Animalia
- Phylum: Chordata
- Class: Aves
- Order: Musophagiformes
- Family: Musophagidae
- Genus: Tauraco
- Species: T. bannermani

Binomial name
- Tauraco bannermani (Bates, 1923)
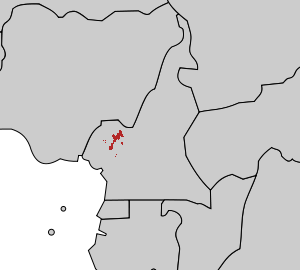
- resident range

= Bannerman's turaco =

Species of bird

Bannerman's turaco (Tauraco bannermani) is a species of bird in the family Musophagidae. It is endemic to Cameroon. In French it is known as touraco de Bannerman or touraco doré. Its scientific and common names honour the ornithologist David Armitage Bannerman. Its natural habitat is subtropical or tropical moist montane forests. It is threatened by habitat destruction and the International Union for Conservation of Nature has listed it as a Near Threatened species.

== Taxonomy ==
The Bannerman's turaco was first described in 1923 by the American naturalist George Latimer Bates. Genetic studies show that this species is closely related to the red-crested turaco (Tauraco erthrolophus) and white-crested turaco (Tauraco leucolophus), having diverged from them in the late Pliocene. At that time, climatic changes occurred which subsequently led to increasingly arid conditions, a decrease in forest cover and an increase in wooded savannah. The white-crested turaco maintained a widespread distribution, perhaps by adapting to new habitats, while Bannerman's turaco became restricted to montane habitats where the forest cover remained.

== Description ==
Bannerman's turaco grows to a length of 43 cm (17 in). It has a grey head, orange-red crown, crest and nape, dark green upper parts, paler green underparts and a blue tail. Red under-wing patches are visible in flight, but it is a shy bird and seldom seen. Its voice is distinctive however, being a raucous series of "kow-kow-kow" notes that can be heard a kilometre away.

== Distribution ==
Bannerman's turaco is endemic to forested mountains in Cameroon. Its main population is in the Bamenda Highlands in western Cameroon, with some birds being present in the Massif du Mbam. It has also been recorded from forested remnants in the Bamenda Highlands in the Western High Plateau. It inhabits montane forest, either primary forests or secondary forests where plenty of tall trees are allowed to remain, supplying the fruits it needs. Its altitudinal range is between 2,200 and 2,600 m (7,200 and 8,500 ft).

== Status ==
The International Union for Conservation of Nature estimates that there are between 4,800 and 14,000 mature individuals scattered among fragmented populations and that the number of birds is decreasing. The chief cause of the declining population is habitat loss, mostly from wildfires, but also from land clearance for agriculture and grazing, and from timber extraction and the collection of firewood. It tends not to survive in forest fragments, being reluctant to cross cleared areas. The birds are also hunted for their feathers which are used in ceremonies by the local villagers. However, new studies have suggested that the population is larger than previously believed, leading the IUCN to downlist the species from Endangered to Near Threatened in 2025.
