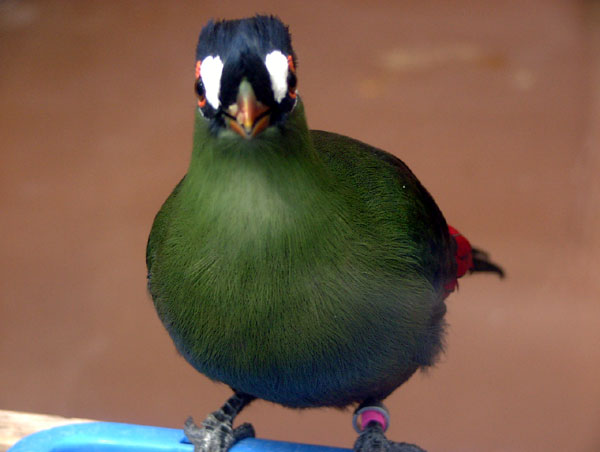

Conservation status
- Least Concern (IUCN 3.1)

Scientific classification
- Kingdom: Animalia
- Phylum: Chordata
- Class: Aves
- Order: Musophagiformes
- Family: Musophagidae
- Genus: Tauraco
- Species: T. hartlaubi

Binomial name
- Tauraco hartlaubi (Fischer & Reichenow, 1884)
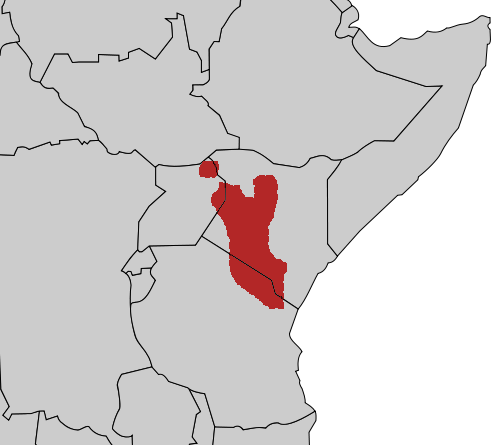

= Hartlaub's turaco =

Species of bird

Hartlaub's turaco (Tauraco hartlaubi) is a species of bird in the family Musophagidae. It is found in Kenya, Tanzania, and Uganda.

The common name and Latin binomial commemorate the German physician and ornithologist Gustav Hartlaub.

== Breeding ==
Heartlaub's turacos are monogamous, territorial and solitary nesters. Their courtship time varies from region to region. Male birds try to impress females with their dancing and their bright colors. Female birds usually lay two eggs, which are dull white and oval-shaped.

== Gallery ==
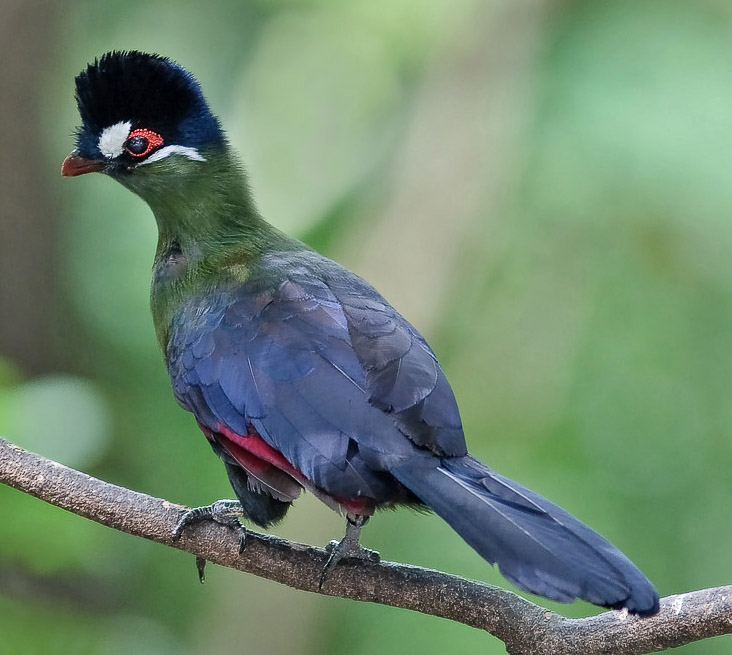

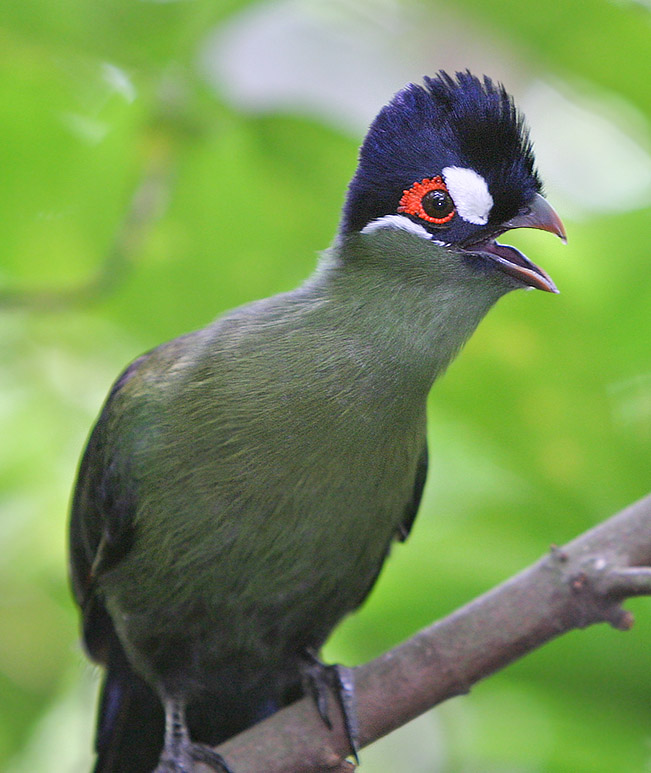
