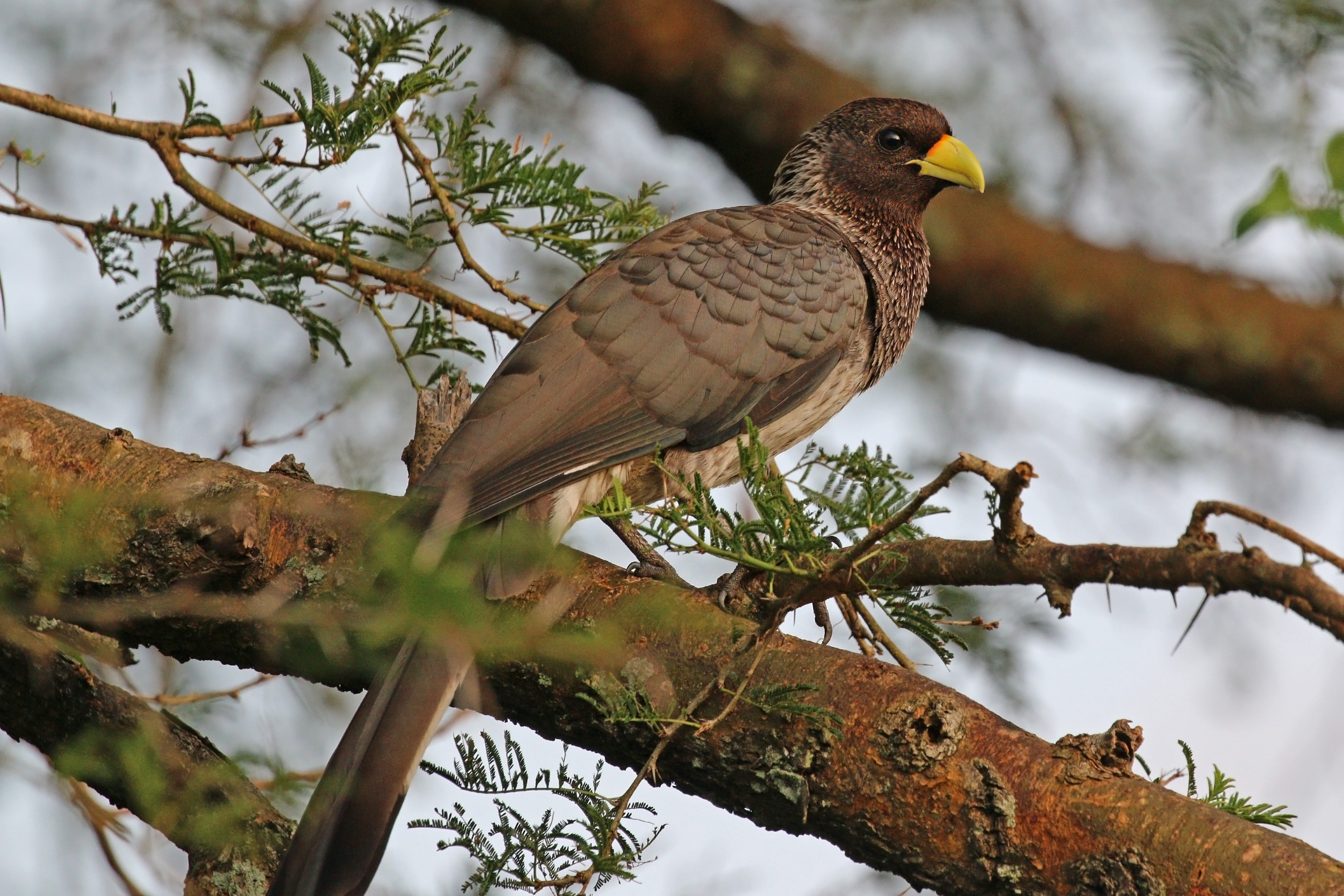
- female, Semliki Wildlife Reserve, Uganda

Conservation status
- Least Concern (IUCN 3.1)

Scientific classification
- Kingdom: Animalia
- Phylum: Chordata
- Class: Aves
- Order: Musophagiformes
- Family: Musophagidae
- Genus: Crinifer
- Species: C. zonurus

Binomial name
- Crinifer zonurus (Rüppell, 1835)

= Eastern plantain-eater =

Species of bird

The eastern plantain-eater (Crinifer zonurus) also known as the eastern grey plantain-eater, is a large member of the turaco family, a group of large arboreal birds restricted to Africa.

This species is a resident breeder in open woodland habitats in tropical east Africa. It lays two or three eggs in a tree platform nest.

These are common, noisy and conspicuous birds, despite lacking the brilliant colours of relatives such as the violet turaco. They are 50 cm (20 in) long, including a long tail, and weigh 392–737 g (13.8–26.0 oz). Their plumage is mainly grey above spotted with brown. The head, erectile crest, neck and breast are brown streaked with silver. The underparts are whitish, heavily streaked with brown.

The eastern plantain-eater has a thick bright yellow bill, and shows a white wing bar in flight. The sexes are identical, but immature individuals have a black woolly head without silver streaking.

This bird is similar to the closely related western plantain-eater. However, eastern plantain-eater has white tail bars, and lacks the chest bars and dark wing feather shafts of its western relative.

This species feeds on fruit, especially figs, and other vegetable matter.

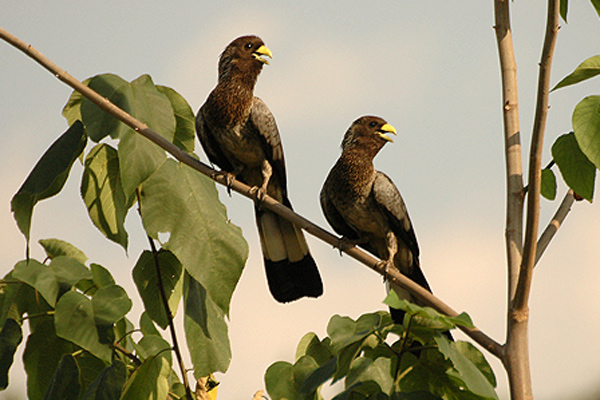
Photographed at Nyabyeya College, Uganda
