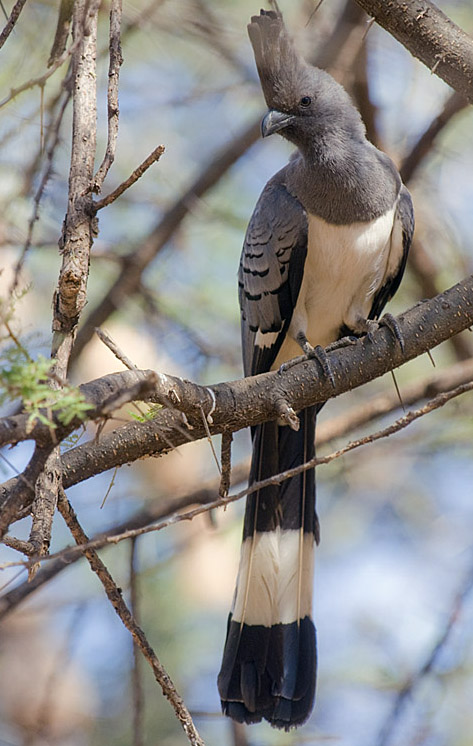
- In Tarangire National Park
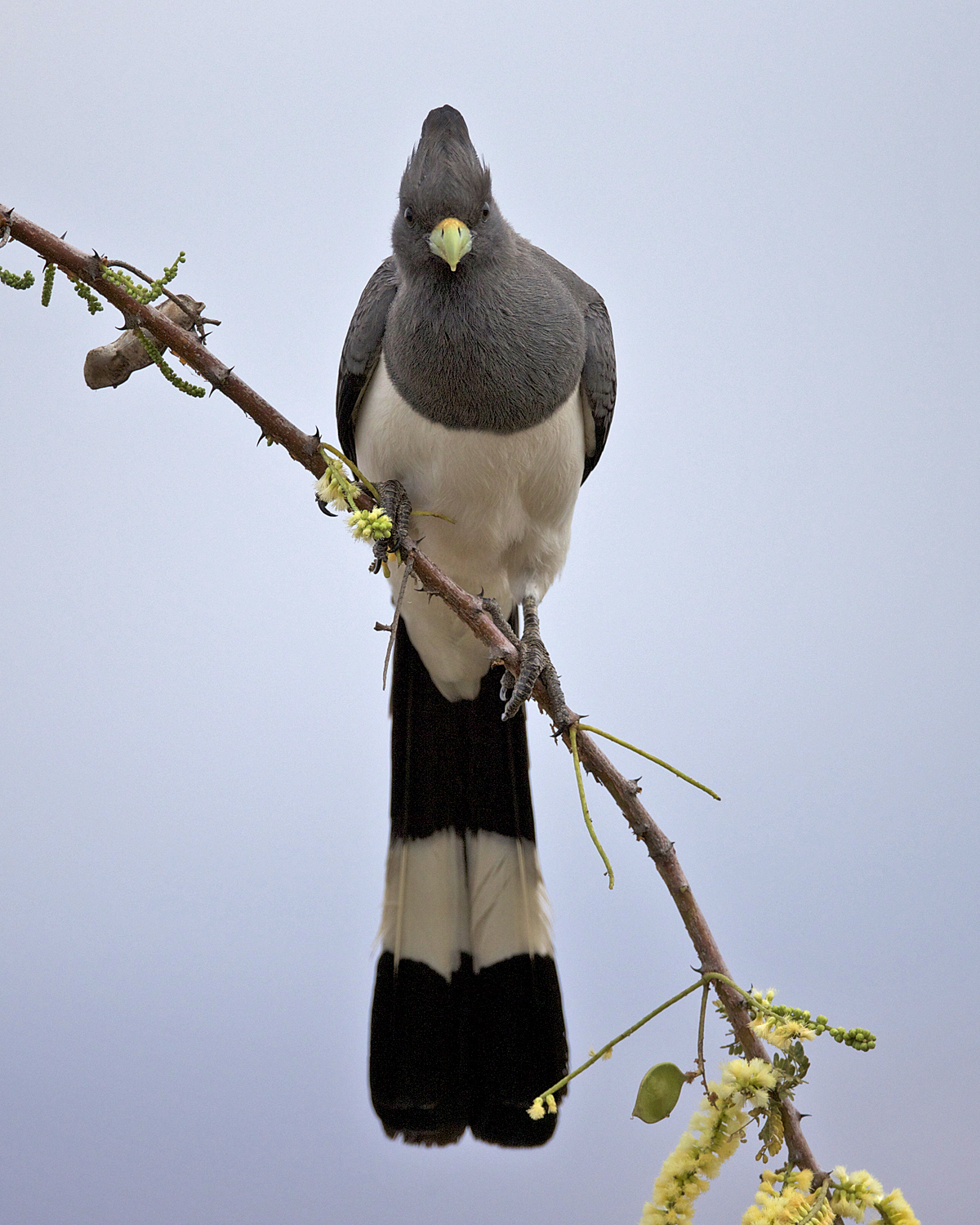
- In Tanzania

Conservation status
- Least Concern (IUCN 3.1)

Scientific classification
- Kingdom: Animalia
- Phylum: Chordata
- Class: Aves
- Order: Musophagiformes
- Family: Musophagidae
- Genus: Crinifer
- Species: C. leucogaster

Binomial name
- Crinifer leucogaster (Rüppell, 1842)
- Approximate distribution Year-round

= White-bellied go-away-bird =

Species of bird

The white-bellied go-away-bird (Crinifer leucogaster) is a bird of eastern Africa in the family Musophagidae, commonly known as turacos.

== Taxonomy ==
German naturalist Eduard Rüppell described this species in 1842.

The white-bellied go-away-bird is placed in the bird family Musophagidae ("banana-eaters"), which includes plantain-eaters and other go-away-birds. Although traditionally, this group was placed within cuckoos in the order Cuculiformes, recent genetic analysis have strongly supported separate placement in the full order of Musophagiformes.

They are semi-zygodactylous meaning the fourth (outer) toe can be switched back and forth. Musophagidae often have prominent crests and long tails. Some species are renowned for their bright pigments.

There is an ongoing discussion over generic-level classification: C. leucogaster is often referred to as being in the genus Corythaixoides or Criniferoides. Most earlier taxonomic treatments place it within Corythaixoide, however many concluded that it required the genus, Crinifer.

== Description ==
This species averages 51 cm (20") in length. Its long, pointed grey and black tail with a white median band is characteristic of the species. It has a white under-wing patch, visible in flight. The adult has a grey head and leading to a dark grey to blackish pointed crest with an approximate length of 6 cm. The belly and under-tail coverts are white, giving the bird the first part of its name "white-bellied".

The bill is black in male, pea-green in the female (becoming yellowish during the breeding season). Females also tend to be larger, weighing 225g - 250g, where as males only weighed 170g - 225g. The juvenile is similar to adults, with the plumage being more brown, especially on wing-coverts.

Typical calls are a nasal haa-haa-haa, like bleating of a sheep, and a single or repeated gwa (or g'away), this distinctive call is where the bird gets the latter part of its name "go-away". It flies from tree to tree in loose straggling groups, calling loudly.

== Distribution and habitat ==
Their habitat consists of hot acacia-steppe, savanna, and woodland areas. It avoids deep forest, but the species has been seen at a range of elevations, from sea level up to 2000m.

Go-away birds are limited to their local ranges due to water availability, but the species occurs across a vast area in and around the Horn of Africa. It is found in Burundi, Djibouti, Eritrea, Ethiopia, northern and eastern Kenya, Rwanda, Somalia, South Sudan, northeastern Uganda, and southwards into the eastern plateau of Tanzania.

== Behavior ==
The white-bellied go-away-bird is sedentary in its range, wandering locally when searching for water and food sources. They are gregarious birds that do not migrate but move in family groups of up to 10. They are territorial and a breeding pair likely maintains its territory year round.

Feeding

The white-bellied go-away-birds feed primarily on plant matter such as fruits, flowers, nectar, seeds and buds of acacias. The species is also known to eat some invertebrates, such as winged termites found when foraging. The species are very agile climbers, allowing for easy foraging in the tree tops. As a result of these feeding habits the White-bellied Go-away-bird is considered a pest in some regions, raiding orchards and plantations of fruiting trees and vegetable crops.

Breeding

During the breeding season (which usually starts with the rainy season), white-bellied go-away-birds become much more vocal. This varies according to range. The birds exhibit courtship behaviour, including chases from tree to tree and displays, where the birds bow and flick the long tail whilst raising and lowering the crest. The black and white pattern is enhanced by these postures and this is believed to be the purpose of the patterning. The white-bellied go-away-bird is monogamous and mutual feeding has been recorded between partners.

The nest is placed in acacia-type tree, 3-12m above the ground. The female lays 2–3 pale bluish eggs. Both sexes incubate for approximately 4 weeks. The first flight of chicks occurs approximately 4–5 weeks after hatching. However, they still depend on parents for food for several weeks after fledging.

== Conservation status ==
The population of white-bellied go-away-birds has not been quantified. Its conservation status is stated to be "of least concern". This is because the population is not believed to be below 10,000 mature individuals and the bird has a wide distribution of over 3 million km^{2}, meaning it does not meet vulnerability criteria. Furthermore, the population appears stable and not to be in decline.

== Gallery ==
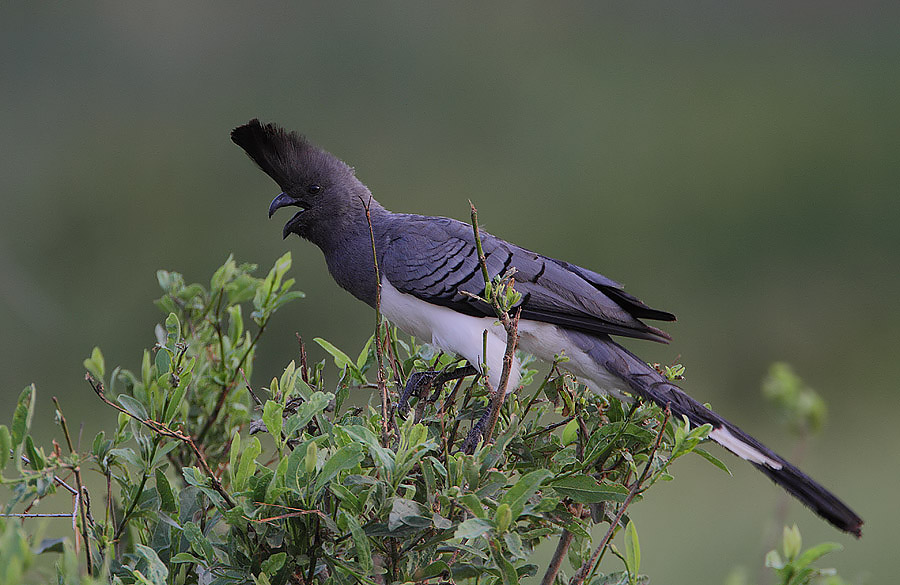
Male in Kenya

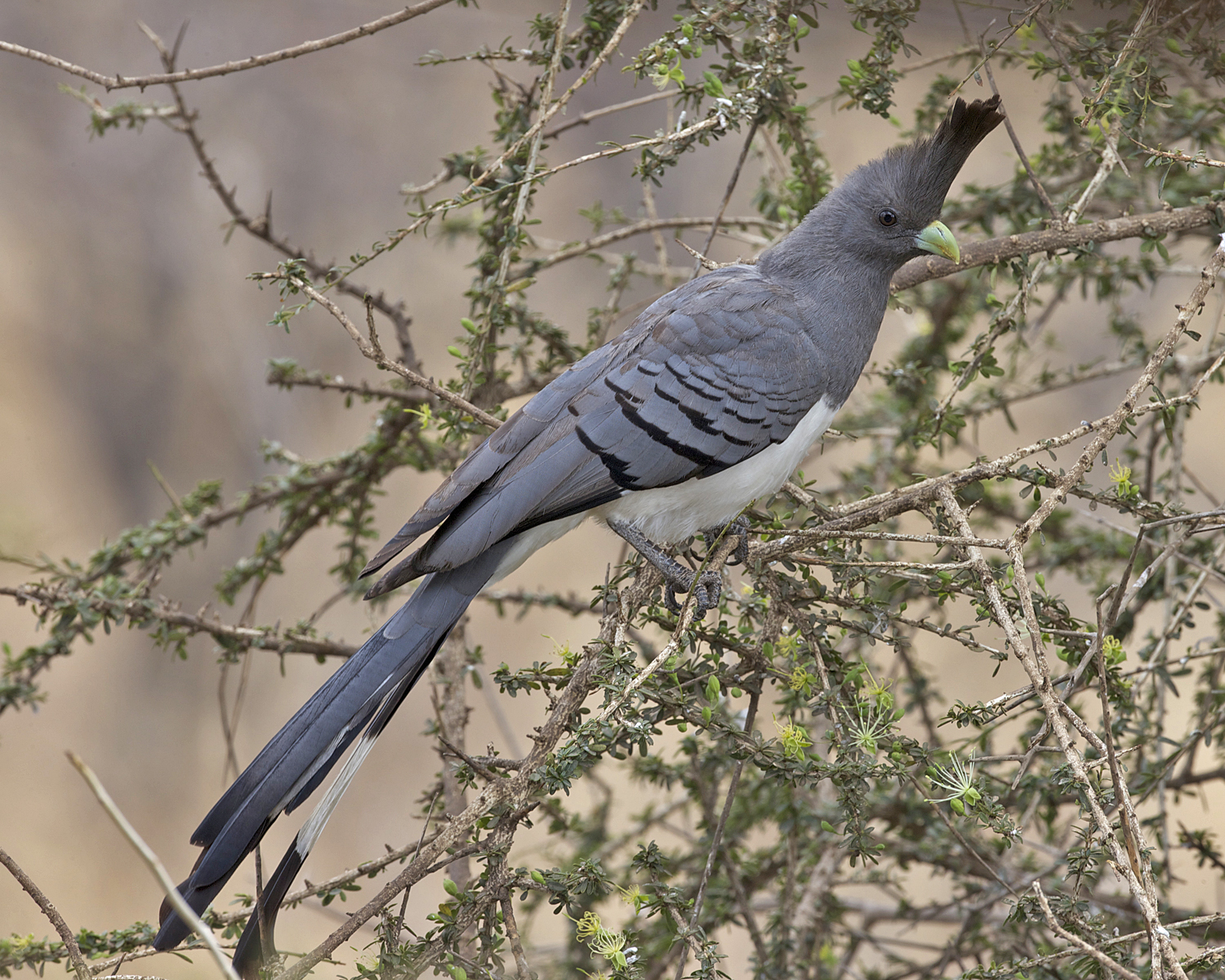
Female

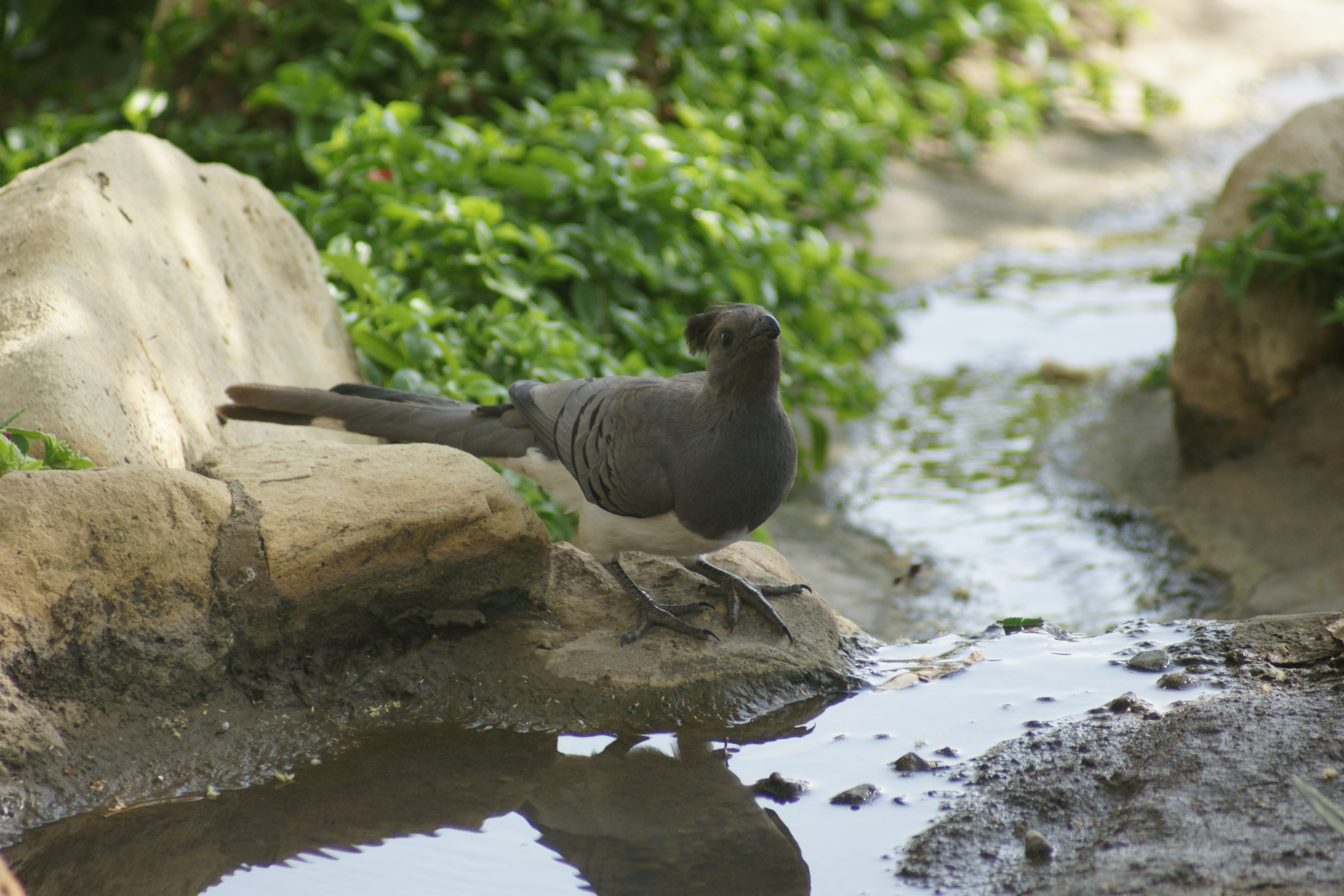
Male

(video) In captivity
