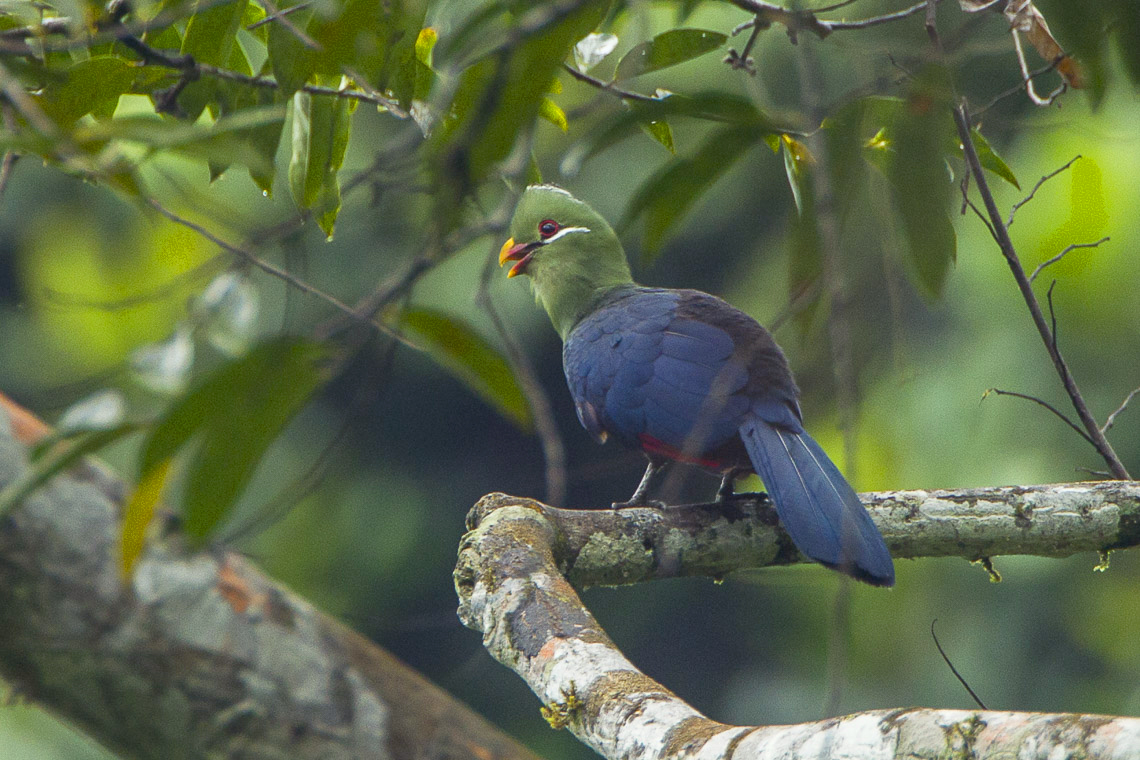

Conservation status
- Least Concern (IUCN 3.1)

Scientific classification
- Kingdom: Animalia
- Phylum: Chordata
- Class: Aves
- Order: Musophagiformes
- Family: Musophagidae
- Genus: Tauraco
- Species: T. macrorhynchus

Binomial name
- Tauraco macrorhynchus (Fraser, 1839)
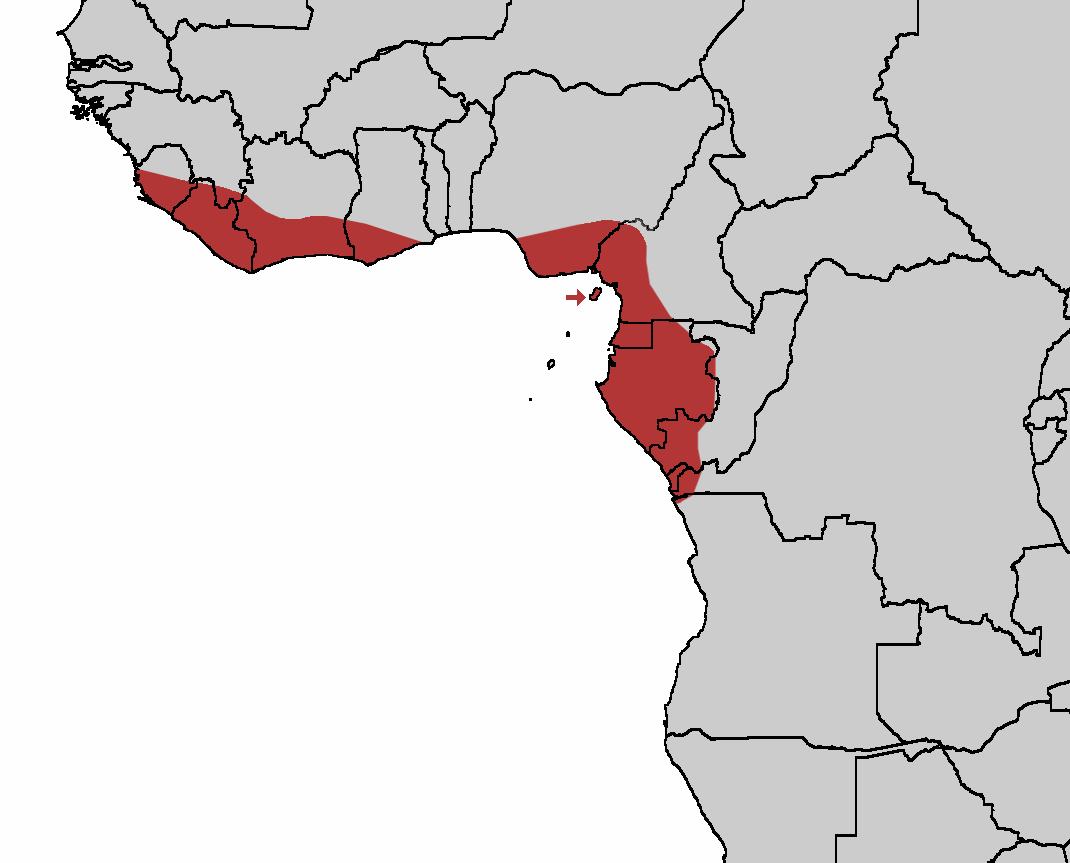
- Distribution of the yellow-billed turaco

= Yellow-billed turaco =

Species of bird

The yellow-billed turaco (Tauraco macrorhynchus) is a species of bird in the family Musophagidae. It is found in Angola, Cameroon, Republic of the Congo, Democratic Republic of the Congo, Ivory Coast, Equatorial Guinea, Gabon, Ghana, Guinea, Liberia, Nigeria, and Sierra Leone.

The range of the yellow-billed turaco has a discontinuity, due to the dryer climate in the Dahomey Gap, separating two morphologically distinct subspecies, T. m. macrorhynchus from Sierra Leone to Ghana and T. m. verreauxii from Nigeria, through DR Congo to Angola. It has been proposed that they be recognised as two phylogenetic species, based on the biogeography, morphology and molecular phylogeny, and that the species be transferred to genus Musophaga, because they are not recovered with other Tauraco species.
