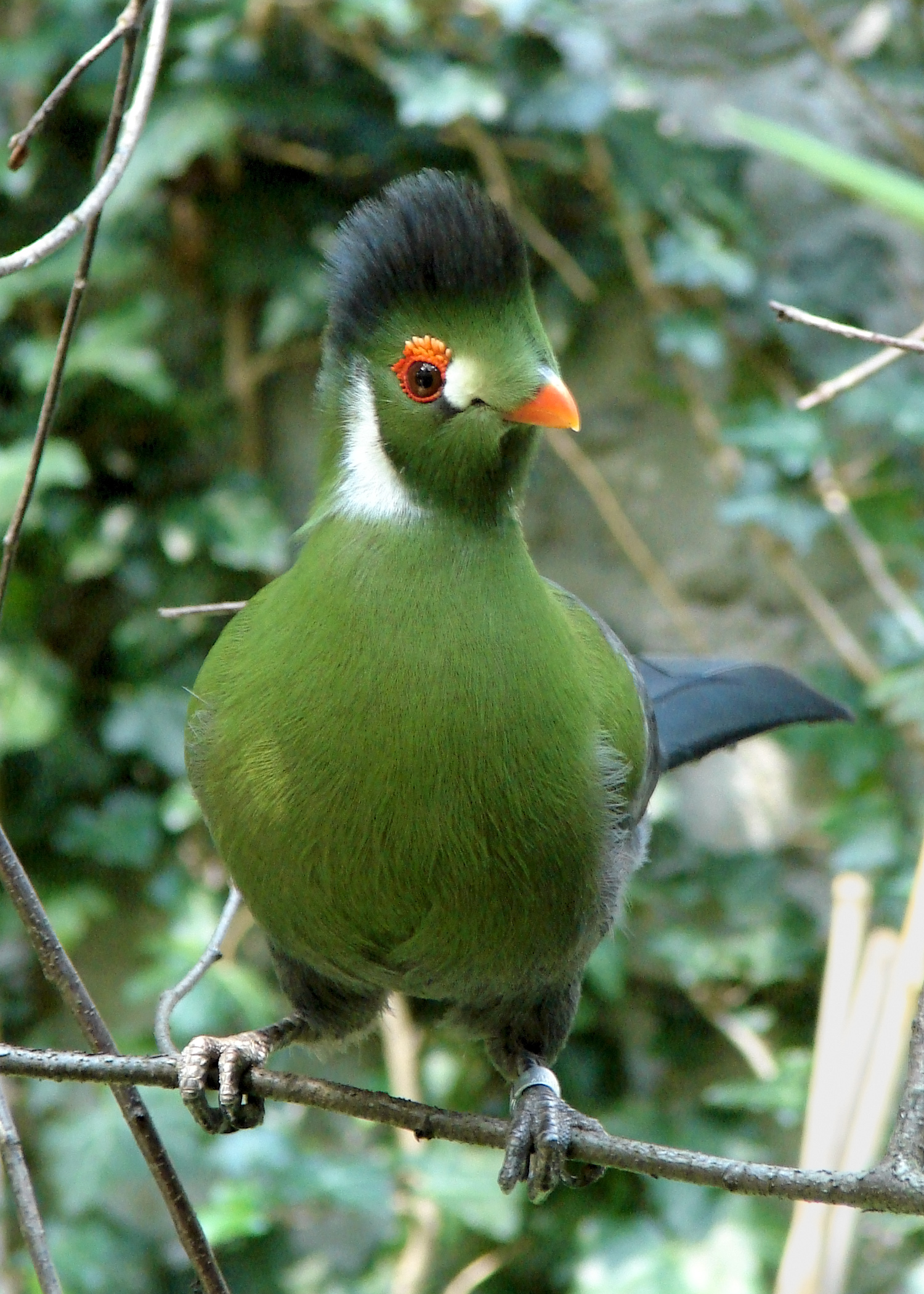
- White-cheeked turaco (Menelikornis leucotis)

Scientific classification
- Domain: Eukaryota
- Kingdom: Animalia
- Phylum: Chordata
- Class: Aves
- Order: Musophagiformes
- Family: Musophagidae
- Genus: Menelikornis; Boetticher, 1947

= Menelikornis =

Genus of birds

Menelikornis is a genus of African birds in the family Musophagidae.

== Species ==
It contains the following species:

Genus Menelikornis – Boetticher, 1947 – two species
Common name	Scientific name and subspecies	Range	Size and ecology	IUCN status and estimated population
White-cheeked turaco	Menelikornis leucotis (Rüppell, 1835)	Sudan, Eritrea, Ethiopia	Size: Habitat: Diet:	LC
Ruspoli's turaco	Menelikornis ruspolii Salvadori, 1896	Ethiopia	Size: Habitat: Diet:	NT
