= Green turaco =

The green turaco is a group of four taxa of turacos, which once were considered conspecific under the scientific name Tauraco persa, but now are treated as four separate species:

- Guinea (or green) turaco, Tauraco persa
- Schalow's turaco, Tauraco schalowi
- Livingstone's turaco, Tauraco livingstonii
- Knysna turaco, Tauraco corythaix
