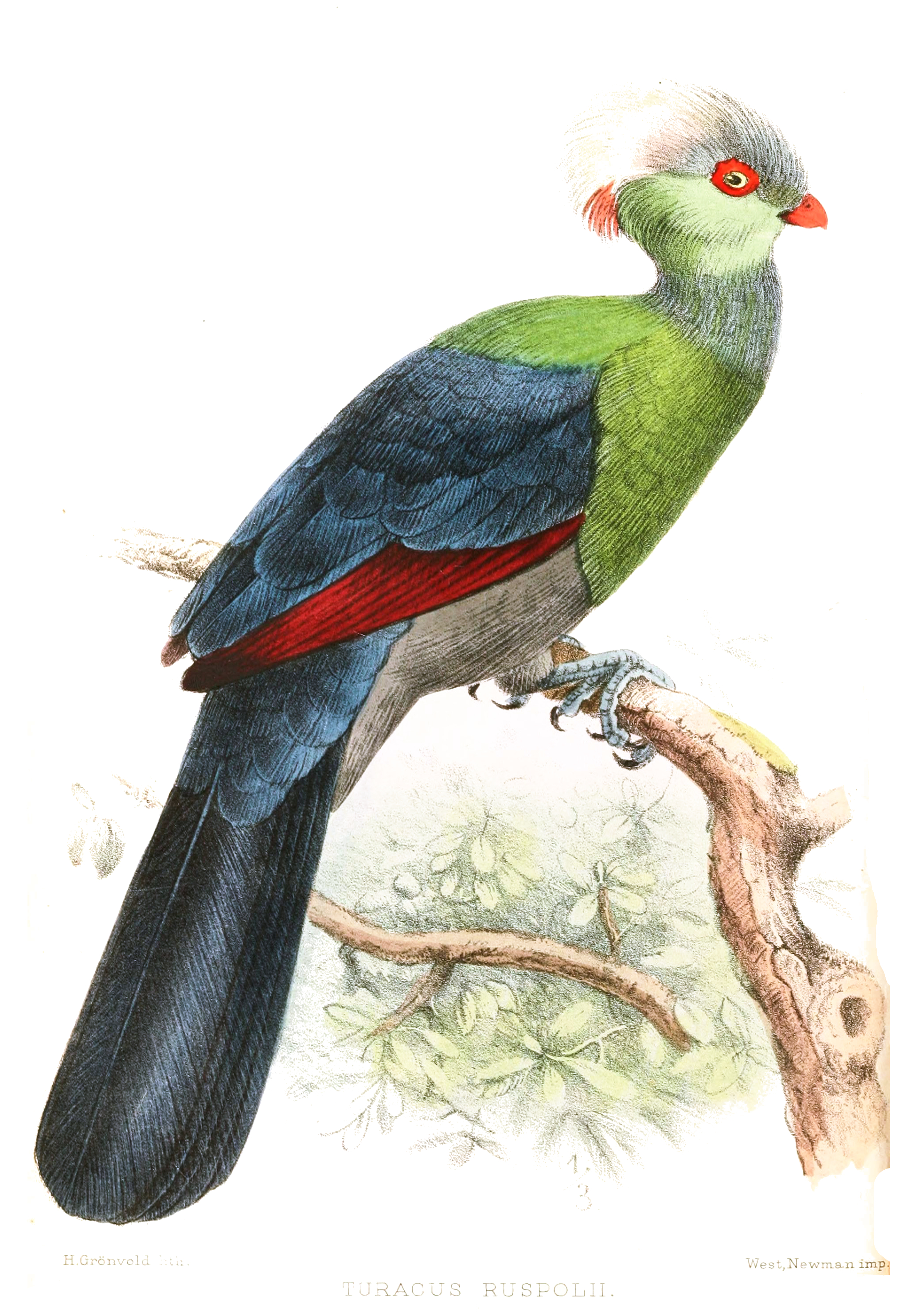

Conservation status
- Near Threatened (IUCN 3.1)

Scientific classification
- Kingdom: Animalia
- Phylum: Chordata
- Class: Aves
- Order: Musophagiformes
- Family: Musophagidae
- Genus: Menelikornis
- Species: M. ruspolii

Binomial name
- Menelikornis ruspolii (Salvadori, 1896)
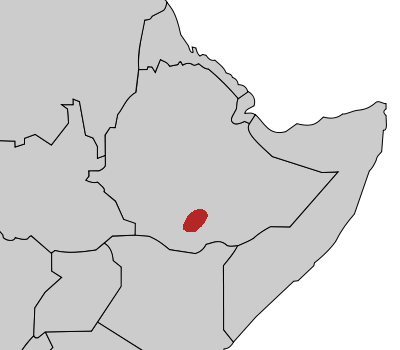

Synonyms
- Tauraco ruspolii

= Ruspoli's turaco =

Species of bird

Ruspoli's turaco (Menelikornis ruspolii), also known as Prince Ruspoli's turaco, is a species of bird in the family Musophagidae. It is endemic to southern Ethiopia where its natural habitat is subtropical or tropical dry forests. It is threatened by habitat loss.

== Taxonomy ==
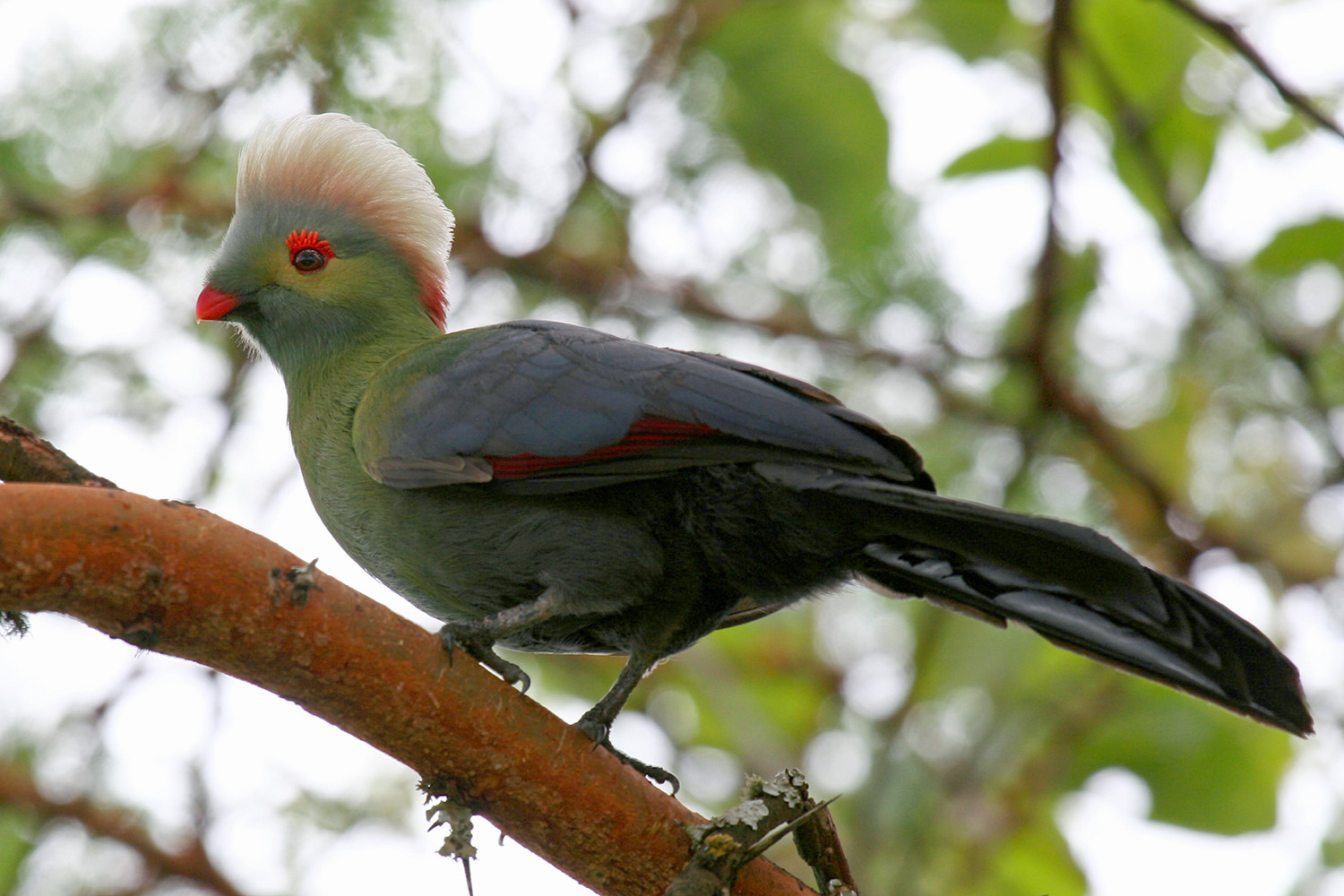
Ruspoli's turaco photographed in the Negele Borena region in Ethiopia

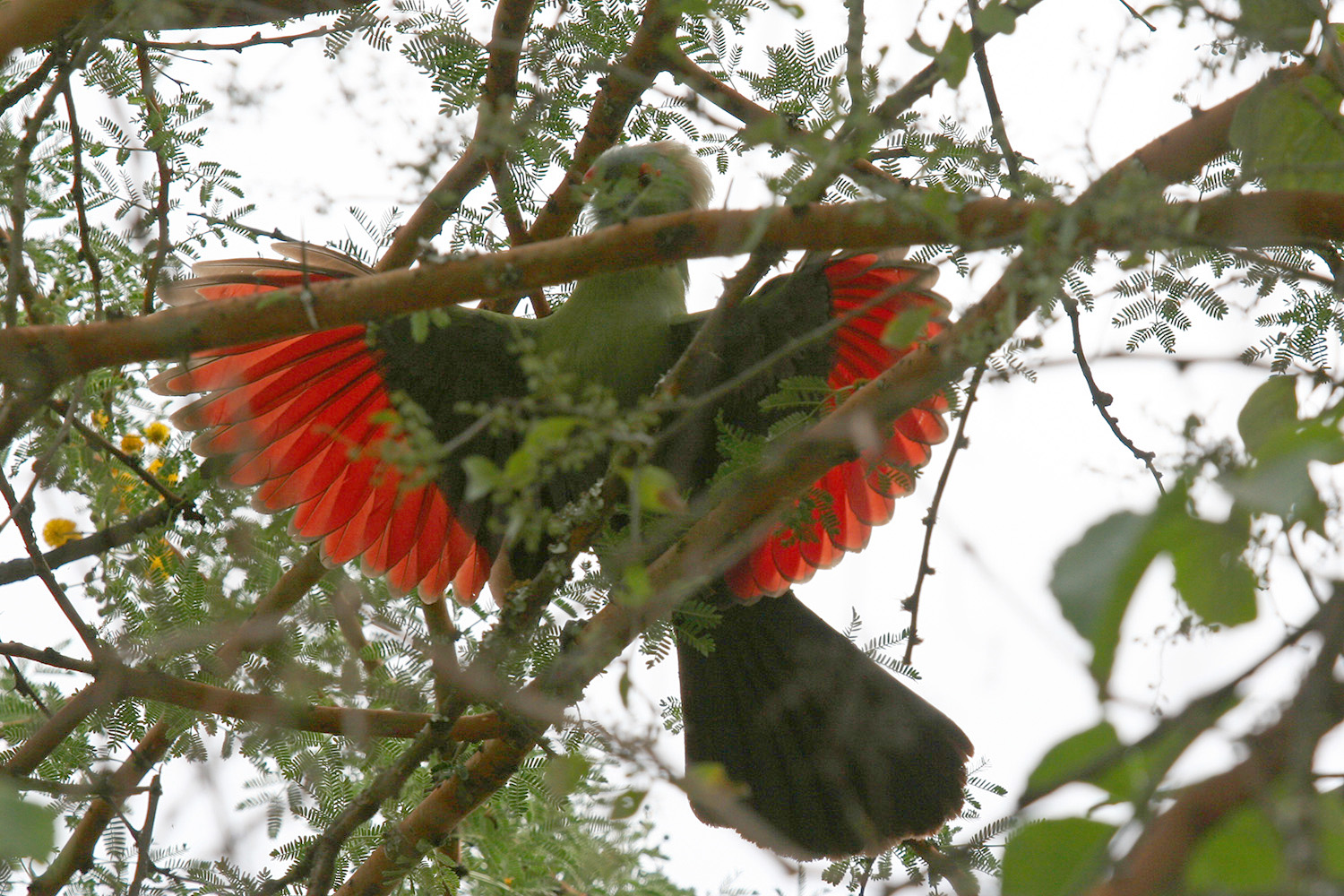
Ruspoli's turaco photographed in the Negele Borena region in Ethiopia

The species was first collected by Eugenio Ruspoli in either 1892 or 1893, but due to his subsequent death, the location and date of this find remain unknown. However, his collection was examined by T. Salvadori, who named the bird in his honor.

== Habitat ==
Prince Ruspoli's Turaco, also known as Tauraco ruspolii, is primarily found in juniper (Juniperus) woodland accompanied by dense evergreen undergrowth near Arero and Wadera. However, it is believed that this elusive bird species has a preference for drier forest edges, acacia-conifer woodland, and mixed broadleaf scrub. It typically inhabits elevations ranging from 1250 to 1860 meters above sea level.
