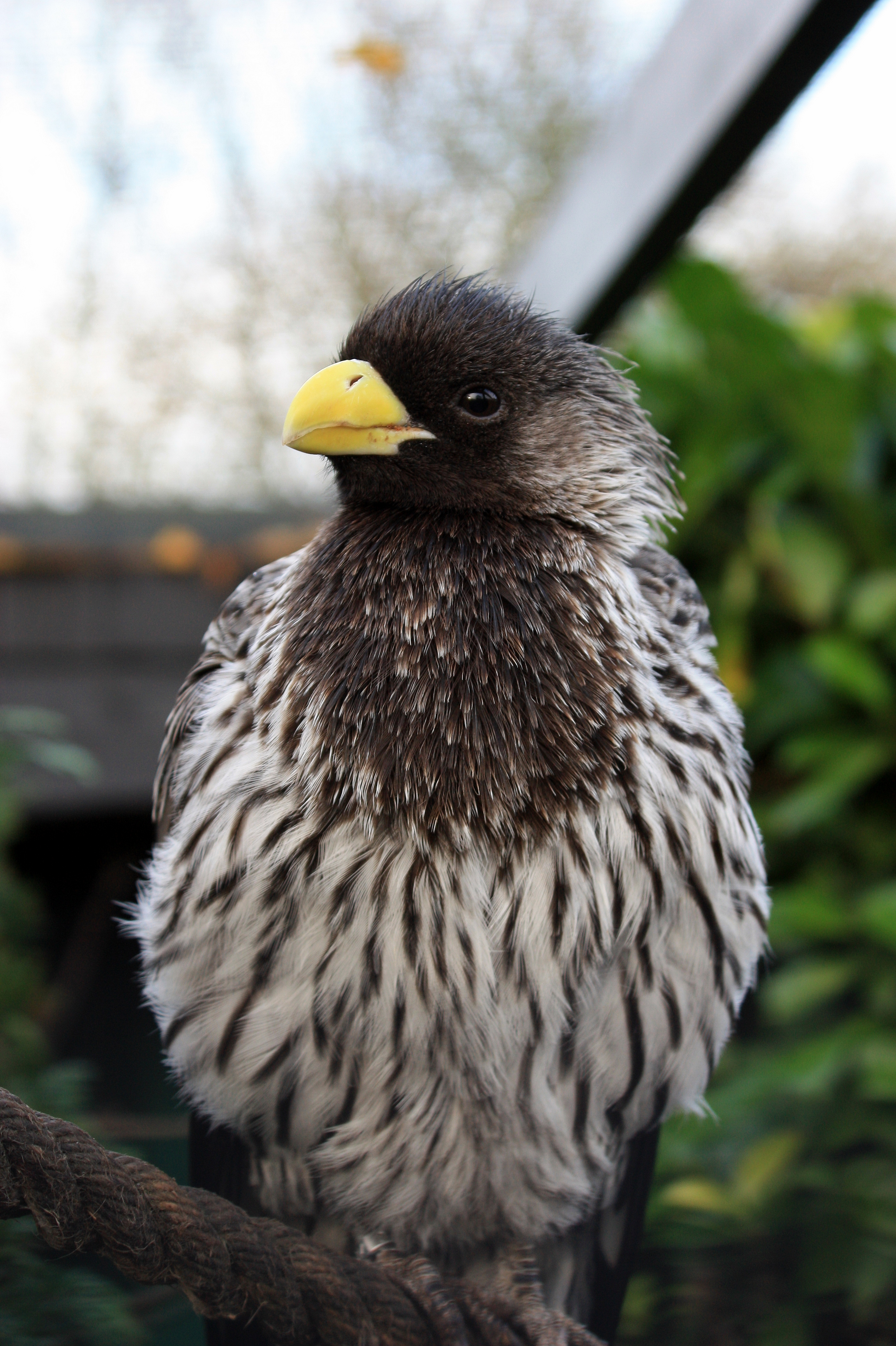
- Western plantain-eater (Crinifer piscator) at Lotherton Hall, England

Scientific classification
- Kingdom: Animalia
- Phylum: Chordata
- Class: Aves
- Order: Musophagiformes
- Family: Musophagidae
- Genus: Crinifer; Jarocki, 1821

Type species
- Phasianus africanus Latham, 1790

Species
- C. piscator C. zonurus C. personatus C. concolor C. leucogaster

= Crinifer =

Genus of birds

Crinifer is a genus of birds in the turaco family. They are restricted to Africa. Formerly, the genus only contained the plantain-eaters, but in 2021, go-away-birds were merged into the genus.

They are large, noisy, and conspicuous birds, but lack the brilliant colours of their relatives. They are mainly grey, with a long tail and an erectile head crest. They feed on fruit, especially figs, seeds, and other vegetable matter.

Unlike many of the brighter forest dwelling turacos these are birds of African open country and have drab grey and white plumage. In Southern Africa, these birds are known as kwêvoëls, though they are also called loeries along with the other turacos.

The go-away-birds are named for their raucous "go away" call.

The genus was erected by the Polish zoologist Feliks Paweł Jarocki in 1821 with the western plantain-eater (Crinifer piscator) as the type species. The name combines the Latin crinis meaning "hair" and -fer meaning "bearing".

== Extant species ==
The genus contains five species:

Genus Crinifer – Jarocki,, 1821 – five species
Common name	Scientific name and subspecies	Range	Size and ecology	IUCN status and estimated population
Eastern plantain-eater	Crinifer zonurus (Rüppell, 1835)	east Africa.	Size: Habitat: Diet:	LC
Western plantain-eater	Crinifer piscator (Boddaert, 1783)	west Africa	Size: Habitat: Diet:	LC
Bare-faced go-away-bird	Crinifer personatus (Rüppell, 1842) Two subspecies: C. p. personatus (Rüppell, 1842); C. p. leopoldi (Shelley, 1881)	Ethiopia, and Burundi, DRC, Kenya, Malawi, Rwanda, Tanzania, Uganda and Zambia.	Size: Habitat: Diet:	LC
Grey go-away-bird	Crinifer concolor (Smith, 1833) Four subspecies: C. c. molybdophanes (Clancey, 1964); C. c. pallidiceps (Neumann, 1899); C. c. bechuanae (Roberts, 1932); C. c. concolor (Smith, A, 1833)	southern Angola, southern DRC, Zambia, southern Tanzania, Malawi, Mozambique, Namibia, Botswana, Zimbabwe, South Africa and Swaziland	Size: Habitat: Diet:	LC
White-bellied go-away-bird	Crinifer leucogaster (Rüppell, 1842)	eastern Africa	Size: Habitat: Diet:	LC
