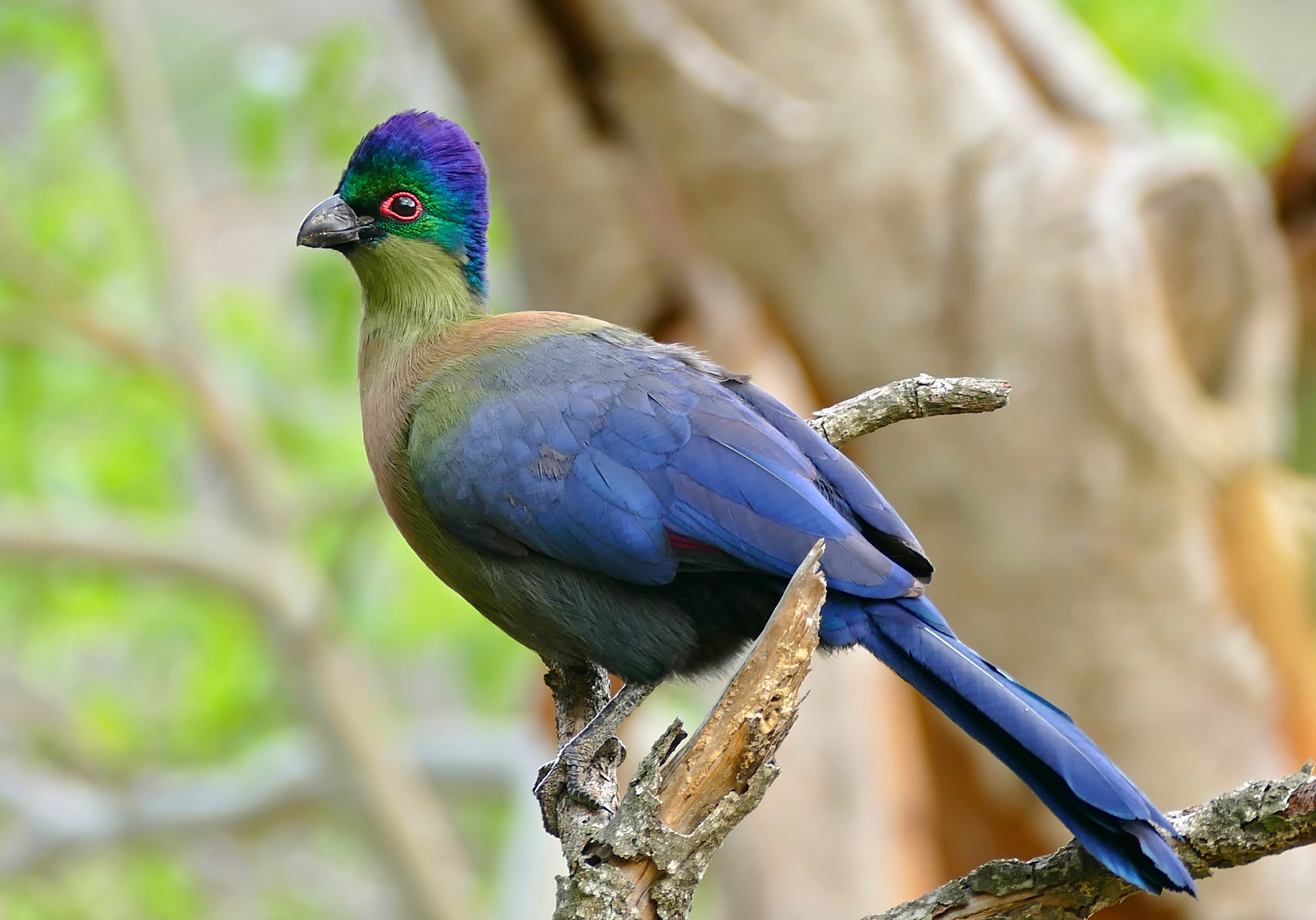
- Purple-crested turaco (Gallirex porphyreolophus)

Scientific classification
- Kingdom: Animalia
- Phylum: Chordata
- Class: Aves
- Order: Musophagiformes
- Family: Musophagidae
- Genus: Gallirex; Lesson, 1844

Type species
- Corythaix porphyreolopha Vigors, 1813

= Gallirex =

Genus of birds

Gallirex is a genus of African birds in the family Musophagidae.

== Species ==
It contains the following two species:

Genus Gallirex – Lesson, 1844 – two species
Common name	Scientific name and subspecies	Range	Size and ecology	IUCN status and estimated population
Purple-crested turaco	Gallirex porphyreolophus (Vigors, 1831)	Burundi, Kenya, Malawi, Mozambique, Rwanda, South Africa, Swaziland, Tanzania, Uganda, Zambia, and Zimbabwe.	Size: Habitat: Diet:	LC
Rwenzori turaco	Gallirex johnstoni Sharpe, 1901	Albertine Rift montane forests	Size: Habitat: Diet:	LC
