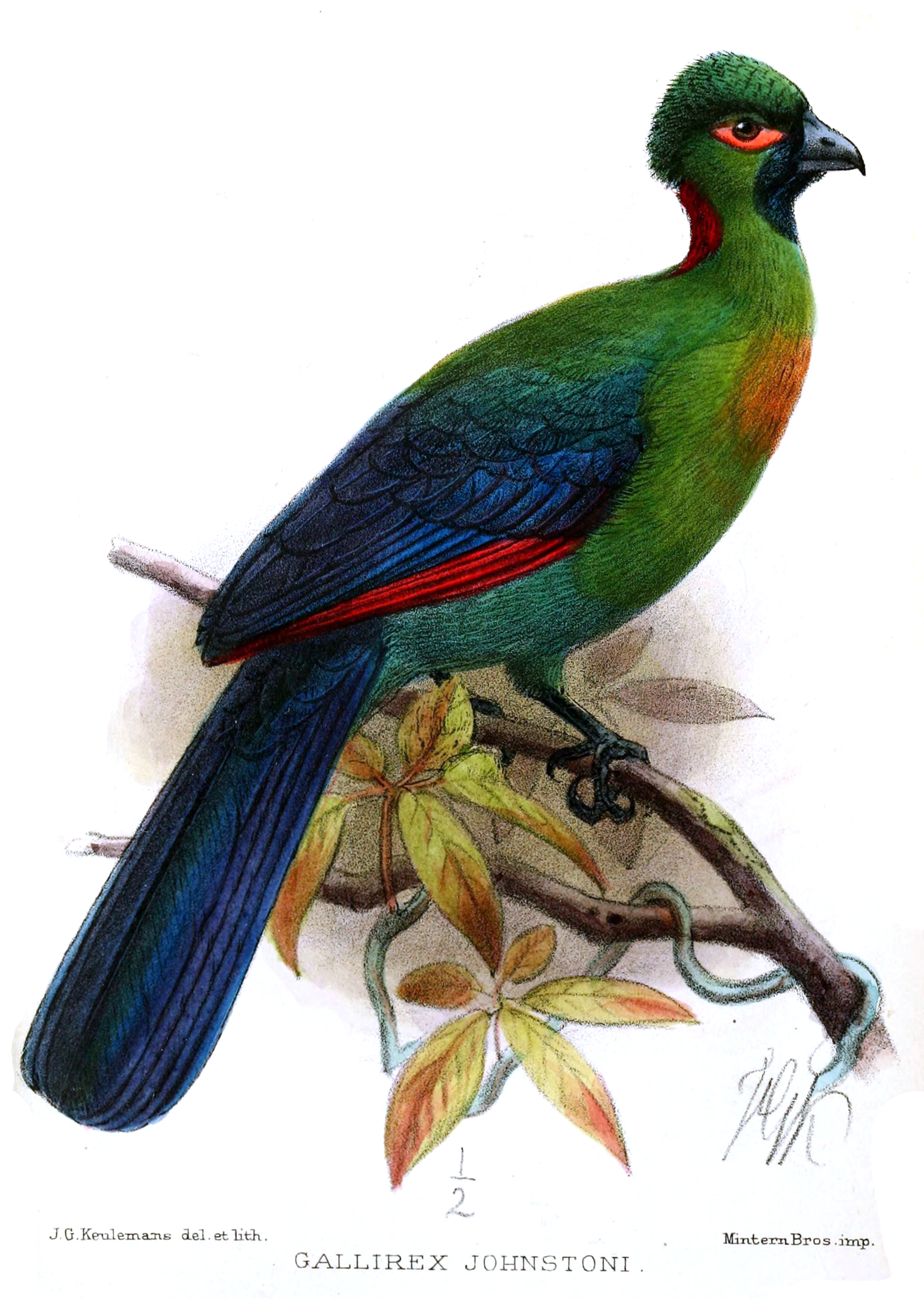

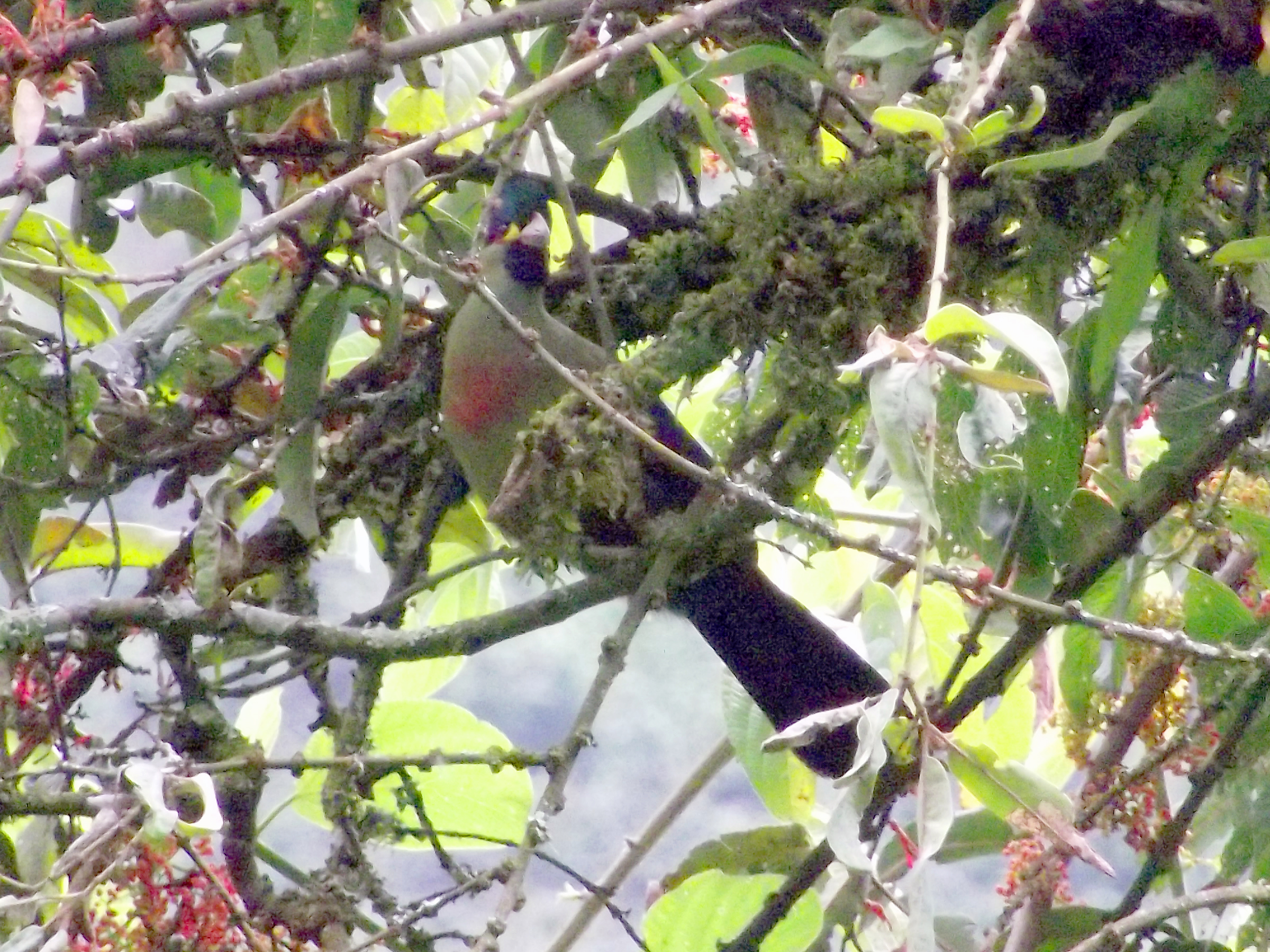

Conservation status
- Least Concern (IUCN 3.1)

Scientific classification
- Kingdom: Animalia
- Phylum: Chordata
- Class: Aves
- Order: Musophagiformes
- Family: Musophagidae
- Genus: Gallirex
- Species: G. johnstoni

Binomial name
- Gallirex johnstoni Sharpe, 1901

Synonyms
- Musophaga johnstoni Ruwenzorornis johnstoni

= Rwenzori turaco =

Species of bird

The Rwenzori turaco (Gallirex johnstoni) is a bird in the family Musophagidae. It is native to the Albertine Rift montane forests.

The Rwenzori turaco is a herbivorous bird: about 92% of its diet consists of fruit and 6.3% of leaves.
