= Loita Forest =

Forest in Kenya

Coordinates: 01°30′S 35°40′E

The Loita Forest, also known as the Loita Naimina Enkiyio Forest or the Forest of the Lost Child, is an upland community forest in Narok County, directly adjacent to the plains of the Masai Mara and the Great Rift Valley, Kenya.

It is one of the few forests in Kenya not yet subject to surveying, but is estimated to cover an area of about 330 km^{2} (82,000 acres). The forest contains a wide array of flora and fauna and has been noted as providing "great cultural and spiritual value to the local communities living adjacent, especially the Loita Maasai".

== Geography and ecosystem ==
Loita Forest is located about 50 kilometers east of the Maasai Mara National Park. It is about 2,300 m (7,500 ft) above sea level. It is part of a larger forest system in Narok County known as the Mau Forest Complex, the largest closed-canopy forest system in Kenya. The area completely lacks roads, making it some of the most remote areas for Maasai clans.

The forest has been described as a "dry upland forest" and an "old-growth cloud forest", with prevalent tree species including cedar and podocarpus trees, (Note: This includes Juniperus procera, Nuxia congesta, Podocarpus falcatus, Olea europaea, Apodytes dimidiata, Cassipourea malosana, Acokanthera schimperi, Ekebergia capensis, Olinia rochetiana, Pistacia aethiopica, Schrebera alata, Vepris nobilis, Vepris simplicifolia, Croton megalocarpus, and Calodendrum capense.) growing as high as 40 m (130 ft).

As many as 50 species of mammals can be found in the forest, including elephants, buffaloes, hippos, antelopes, lions, leopards, and primates. The most recorded mammal species in one study was the bushbuck, a medium-sized African antelope.

== Name and history ==
The name "Forest of the Lost Child" is based on a Maasai legend about a young girl. According to the legend, the girl was taking care of some animal calves when some of them got loose and wandered into the forest. The girl went into the forest to find them. The calves eventually returned home without her. Family members and Maasai warriors marched through the forest to find her, but the girl was never found.

The Loita Maasai have been using the Loita Forest for significant periods of time for grazing, firewood, building poles, water, medicinal plants and ceremonial sites.

== In popular culture ==
The forest was featured on an episode of The Wild Thornberrys which was called "Naimina Enkiyio." In the episode, three Maasai children tell Eliza Thornberry about the legend with further details, such as the existence of a monster who supposedly grabbed the young girl, dragged her to its hiding place and never let her go. They also spoke of the existence of a muddy pool that pulls the victim in and drowns them, and of the existence of giant warriors in the forest who pounce on their victims, kill them and then cannibalize them. However, the episode lists the location as Tanzania, not Kenya, though the Loita Forest itself is in Kenya. However, Maasai Land is divided between the two countries, and the story of the Lost Girl ("Entito Naimina") or Lost Child ("Enkiyio Naimina") is well known throughout all sections of Maasai Land.

Loita High School, the only secondary school in Entasekera Area and the entire Loita Division is also found in the big southern part of the Loita Forest.
