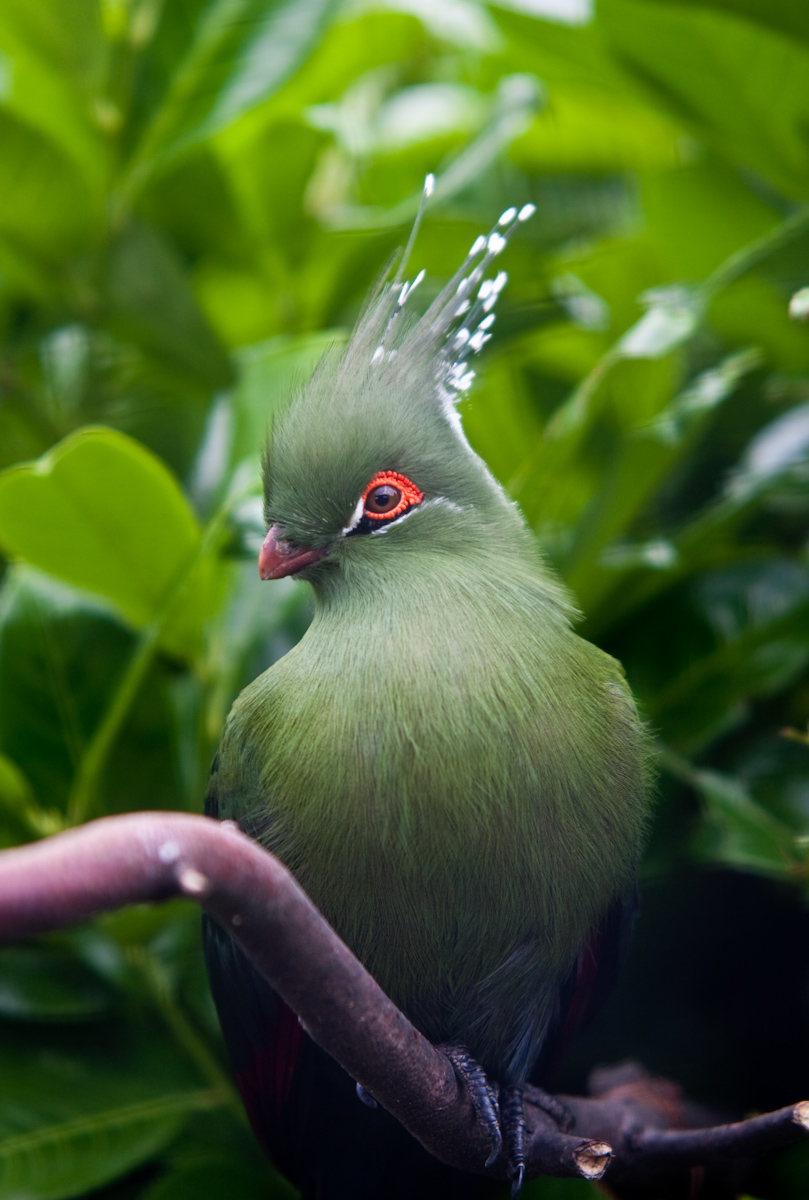
- At Lotherton Bird Gardens, Leeds

Conservation status
- Least Concern (IUCN 3.1)

Scientific classification
- Kingdom: Animalia
- Phylum: Chordata
- Class: Aves
- Order: Musophagiformes
- Family: Musophagidae
- Genus: Tauraco
- Species: T. schalowi

Binomial name
- Tauraco schalowi (Reichenow, 1891)
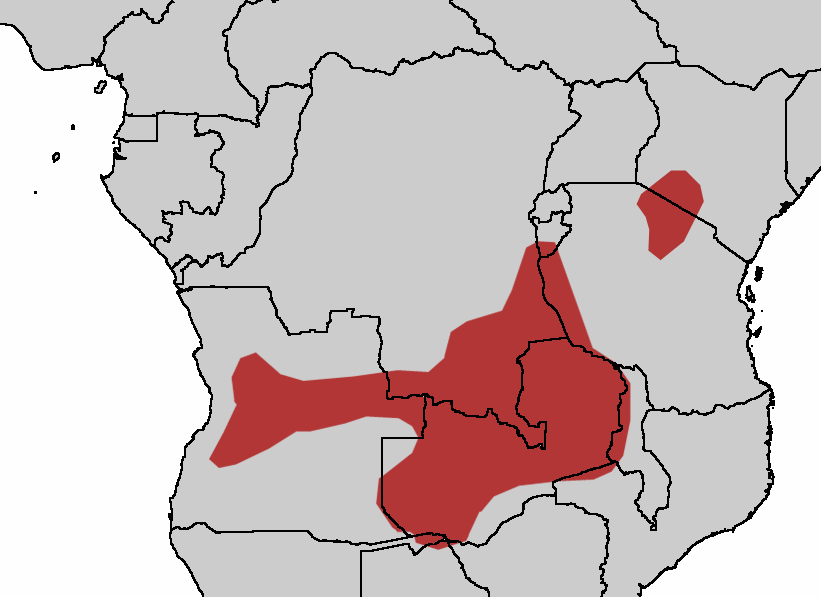
- Distribution of the Schalow's turaco

= Schalow's turaco =

Species of bird

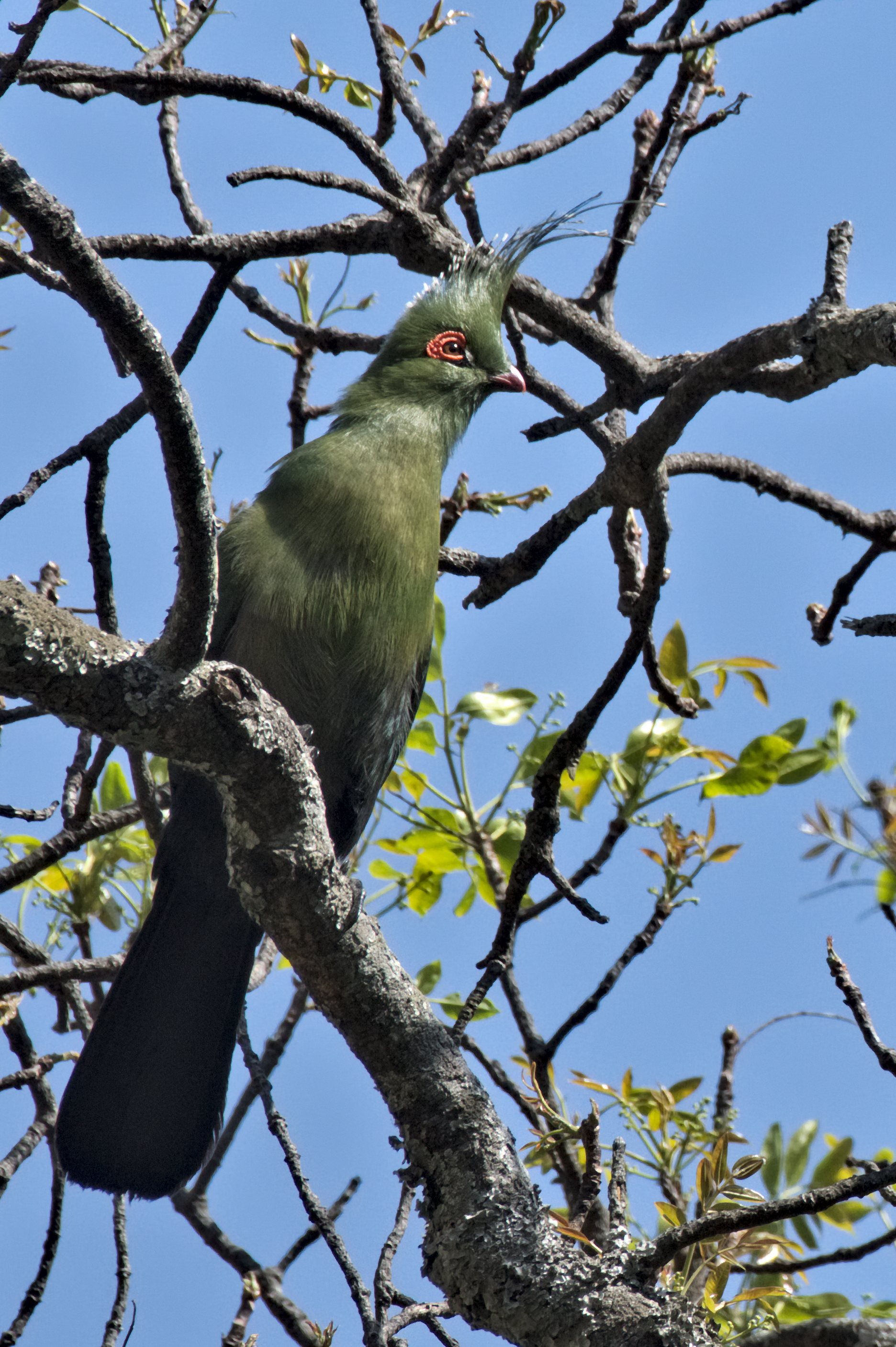
Schalow's Turaco

Schalow's turaco (Tauraco schalowi) is a frugivorous bird in the family Musophagidae. This bird's common name and Latin binomial commemorate the German banker and amateur ornithologist Herman Schalow.

== Characteristics ==
Schalow's turaco showing wing feathers during short flights

These birds are light for a turaco species; weighing just over half a pound (270g), with a length of 15 to 17 inches. Their colour is a coppery-jade green that fades to a dark iridescent blue the closer you get towards the tail. They have long white tripped crests with small red beaks and red skin around their dark eyes lined with white feathers. Mature birds have, on average, the longest crests of any turaco species. Their wings are short and round with red flight feathers meant for short flights.

== Habitat ==
It is distributed mainly in Zambia, central Angola, the southern DRC, and the uplands of southern Kenya, northern and western Tanzania and western Malawi. It occurs very locally in Botswana, Namibia and Zimbabwe, where it frequents riparian habitats of the Zambezi and Cuando Rivers. It occurs in the forested uplands and wooded inland plateaus of south central Africa. It is replaced in the eastern lowlands by Livingstone's turaco, which is comparable in appearance and behavior.

== Diet ==
Schalows consume mainly fruit and other plant matter, while eating a more insect-based diet as chicks. They will generally feed in large flocks and are social outside of nesting.

== Reproduction ==
These birds are territorial of their nesting site. Solitary monogamous pairs will nest and care for their offspring; sharing incubation duties that last for 20 to 22 days. Their clutch generally only consists of two eggs, laid in a platform nest built high in the forest canopy. Within 2 to 3 weeks, the chicks are strong enough to climb outside of the nest, and will start flying after another 1 to 2 weeks.
