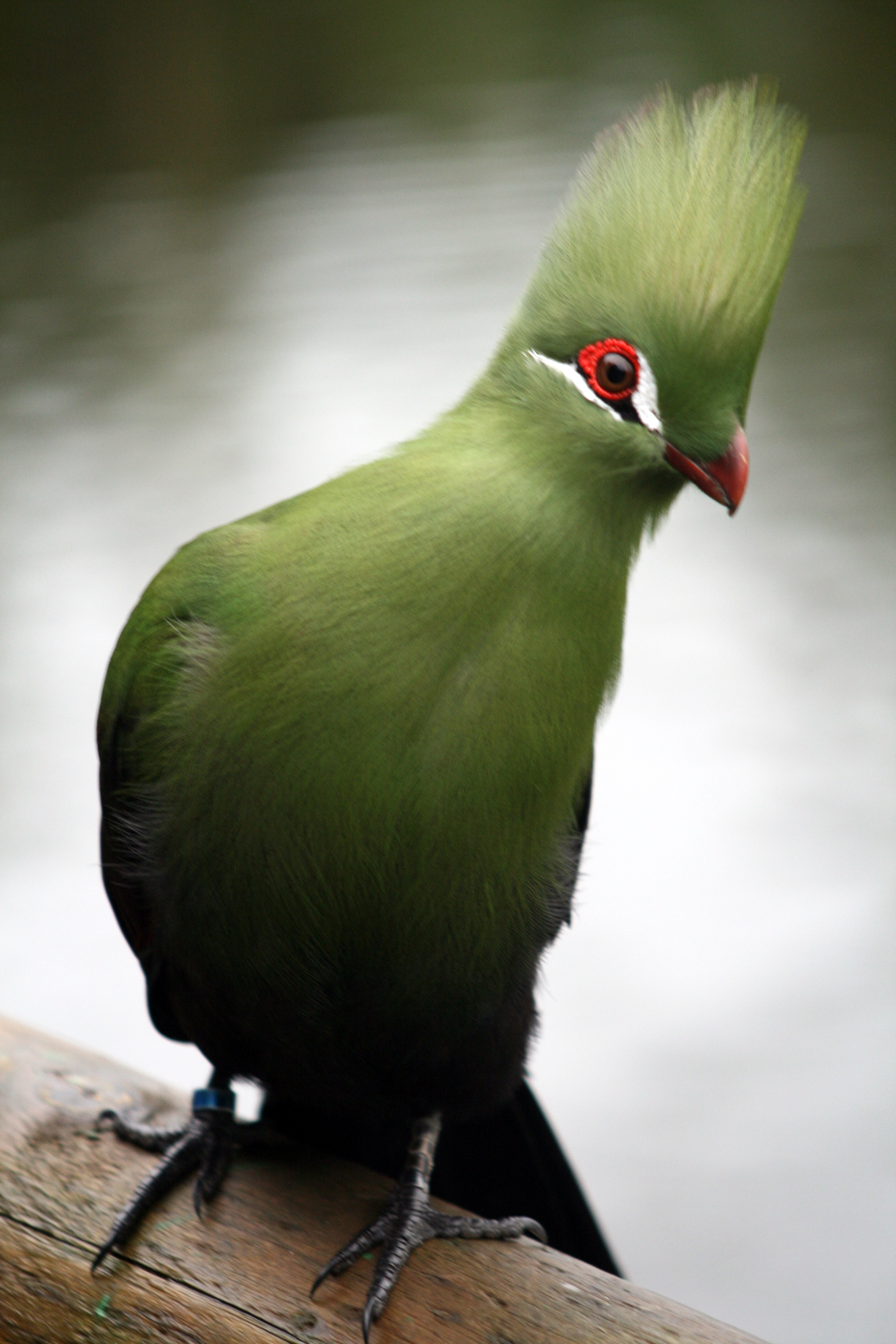
- Guinea turaco (Tauraco persa) at Birds of Eden aviary, South Africa

Scientific classification
- Kingdom: Animalia
- Phylum: Chordata
- Class: Aves
- Clade: Otidimorphae
- Order: Musophagiformes; Seebohm, 1890
- Family: Musophagidae; Lesson, 1828

Genera
- Corythaeola; Crinifer; Gallirex; Menelikornis; Tauraco

Synonyms
- Apopempsidae Brodkorb, 1971b; Veflintornithidae Kašin, 1976; Turaconidae

= Turaco =

Turacos and relatives Temporal range: Oligocene–Holocene, 24–0 Ma Possible Early Eocene record

Family of birds

The turacos make up the bird family Musophagidae (/ˌmjuːzoʊˈfædʒɪdiː/ "banana-eaters"), which includes plantain-eaters and go-away-birds. In southern Africa both turacos and go-away-birds are commonly known as loeries. They are semi-zygodactylous: the fourth (outer) toe can be switched back and forth. The second and third toes, which always point forward, are conjoined in some species. Musophagids often have prominent crests and long tails; the turacos are noted for peculiar and unique pigments giving them their bright green and red feathers.

Traditionally, this group has been allied with the cuckoos in the order Cuculiformes, but the Sibley-Ahlquist taxonomy raises this group to a full order Musophagiformes. They have been proposed to link the hoatzin to the other living birds, but this was later disputed. Recent genetic analyses have strongly supported the order ranking of Musophagiformes.

Musophagidae is one of very few bird families endemic to Africa, one other being the mousebirds, Colliidae. All species are frugivorous, but they also eat leaves, buds, and flowers. Figs are an important part of their diet. They have rounded wings and long tails and strong legs, making them poor fliers, but good runners.

Turacos are medium-sized arboreal birds endemic to sub-Saharan Africa, where they live in forests, woodland and savanna. Turacos can occasionally be found outside of their native range as escapes from captivity.

They are gregarious, non-migratory birds which move in family groups of up to 10. Many species are noisy, with the go-away-birds being especially noted for their piercing alarm calls, which alert other fauna to the presence of predators; their common name is onomatopoeia of this. Musophagids build large stick nests in trees, and lay 2 or 3 eggs. The young are born with thick down and open, or nearly-open, eyes.

== Morphology ==
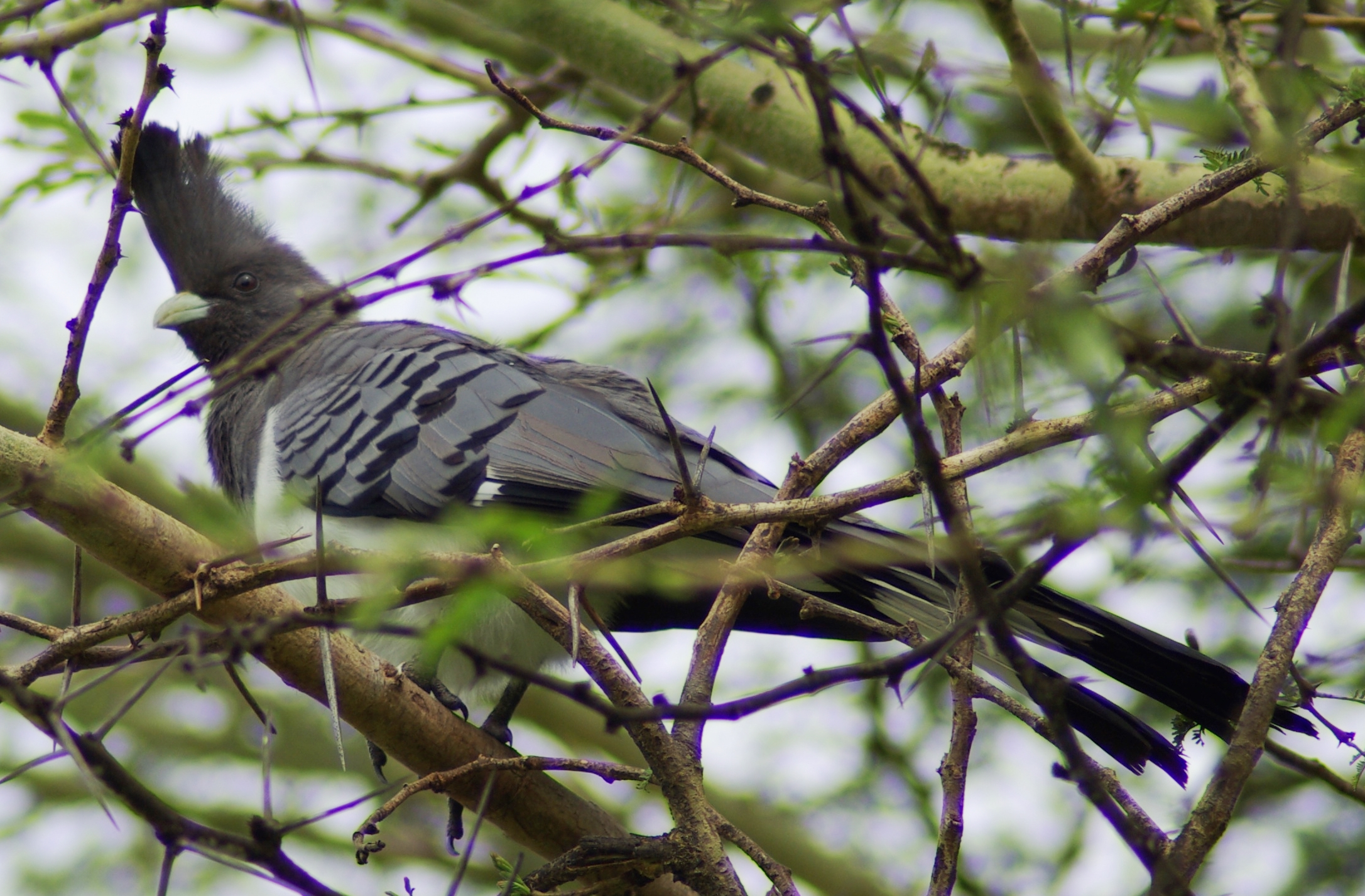
Female white-bellied go-away-bird, Crinifer leucogaster

Most turacos are medium-sized birds – an exception being the large great blue turaco – with long tails and short, rounded wings. They range in length from 40 to 75 cm (16–30 in). Their flight is weak, but they are strong climbers and are able to move nimbly on branches and through vegetation. Juveniles have claws on the wings that help them climb. They have a unique foot arrangement, where the fourth toe can be brought around to the back of the foot where it almost touches the first toe, or brought around so that it is near the second and third. In spite of this flexibility the toe is actually usually held at right angles to the axis of the foot.

The plumage of go-away-birds and plantain-eaters is mainly grey and white. The turacos on the other hand are brightly coloured birds, usually blue, green or purple. The green colour in turacos comes from turacoverdin, the only true green pigment in birds known to date. Other "greens" in bird colors result from a yellow pigment such as some carotenoid, combined with the prismatic physical structure of the feather itself which scatters the light in a particular way and giving a blue colour.

Turaco wings contain the red pigment turacin, unlike in other birds where red colour is due to carotenoids. Both pigments are derived from porphyrins and only known from the Musophagidae into the 21st century, but especially the little-researched turacoverdin might have relatives in other birds. The incidence of turacoverdin in relation to habitat is of interest to scientists, being present in forest species but absent in savanna- and acacia-living species.

Little is known about the longevity of wild turacos, but in captivity they are proving to be exceptionally long-lived, easily living to 30 years in captivity. A bird in the Cotswold Wildlife Park collection in England approached its 37th year.

== Evolution and systematics ==
The fossil genus Veflintornis is known from the Middle Miocene of Grive-Saint-Alban (France). It was established as Apopempsis by Pierce Brodkorb in 1971, but this is pre-empted by Schenkling's 1903 use of the name for some beetles. "Apopempsis" africanus (Early Miocene of Kenya) might also belong there.

Further fossil material of putative musophagids was found in Egypt as well as in Late Oligocene deposits at Gaimersheim in Germany and Middle Miocene deposits at Grive-Saint-Alban and Vieux-Collonges (each in France). While it is not entirely certain that these fossils are indeed of turacos, it nonetheless appears as if the family evolved in the Oligocene of central Europe or perhaps northern Africa, and later on shifted its distribution southwards. The climate of those European regions during the late Paleogene was not too dissimilar to that of (sub)tropical Africa today; the Saharan desert was not yet present and the distance across the Mediterranean was not much more than what it is today. Thus such a move south may well have been a very slow and gradual shifting of a large and continuous range.

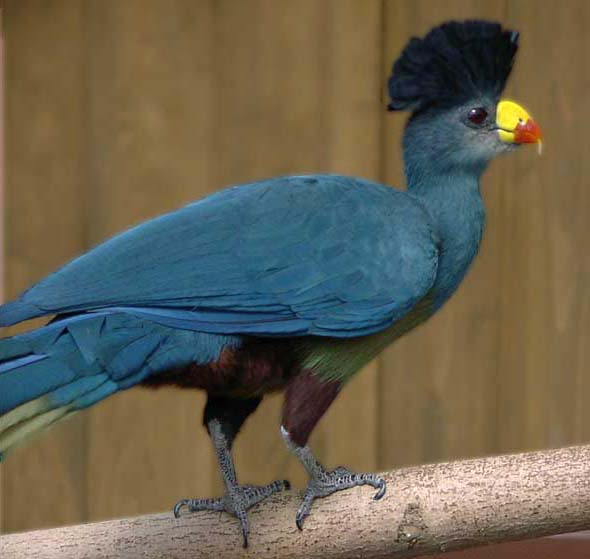
Great blue turaco Corythaeola cristata

The Early Eocene Promusophaga was initially believed to be the oldest record of the turacos; it was eventually reconsidered a distant relative of the ostrich and is now in the ratite family Lithornithidae. Filholornis from the Late Eocene or Early Oligocene of France is occasionally considered a musophagid, but its relationships have always been disputed. It is not often considered a turaco in more recent times and has been synonymised with the presumed gruiform Talantatos, though it is not certain whether this will become widely accepted.

The phylogenetic analysis conducted by Field & Hsiang (2018) indicated that Eocene (Wasatchian) species Foro panarium known from the Fossil Butte Member of the Green River Formation (Wyoming, United States) was a stem-turaco.

=== Phylogeny ===
The IOC World Bird List (version 10.1) recognises 23 species of turaco in six genera. However, a phylogenetic analysis by Perktaş et al (2020) found genus Tauraco polyphyletic and a revised classification has been proposed based on molecular, morphological and biogeographic analysis. This study recognised 33 species-level taxa in seven genera corresponding to the major clades. The following phylogenetic tree is based on this proposal and uses their proposed genus and species names; and has been largely accepted by more recent versions of the IOC World Bird List, except that Proturacus is retained within Tauraco.

- - - Corythaeolinae
      - Corythaeola cristata (great blue turaco)
    - Criniferinae (Crinifer sensu lato) (Note: Broader definition of Crinifer proposed, because Corythaixoides leucogaster is recovered with the Crinifer species rather than the other Corythaixoides species)
      - - Crinifer leucogaster (white-bellied go-away-bird)
        - Crinifer sensu stricto
          - Crinifer piscator (western plantain-eater)
          - Crinifer zonurus (eastern plantain-eater)
      - - Crinifer personatus (bare-faced go-away-bird)
        - Crinifer concolor (grey go-away-bird)
  - Musophaginae
    - Gallirex (Note: Proposed genus for clade of former Taurico and Ruwenzorornis species)
      - - Gallirex porphyreolophus (southern purple-crested turaco)
        - Gallirex chlorochlamys (northern purple-crested turaco) (Note: Proposed species split based on phylogenetic species principle.)
      - - Gallirex kivuensis (Kivu turaco)
        - Gallirex johnstoni (Rwenzori turaco)
    - - Menelikornis (Note: Proposed genus for clade of former Taurico species)
        - Menelikornis ruspolii (Prince Ruspoli's turaco)
        - - Menelikornis leucotis (white-cheeked turaco)
          - Menelikornis donaldsoni (Donaldson's turaco)
      - - Musophaga
          - - Musophaga macrorhynchus (western yellow-billed turaco)
            - Musophaga verreauxii (eastern yellow-billed turaco)
          - - Musophaga violacea (violet turaco)
            - Musophaga rossae (Ross's turaco)
        - Tauraco sensu lato
          - Proturacus (Note: Proposed recognition of genus Proturacus for a clade of Tauraco bannermani, Tauraco erythrolophus and Tauraco leucolophus.)
            - Proturacus bannermani (Bannerman's turaco)
            - - Proturacus erythrolophus (red-crested turaco)
              - Proturacus leucolophus (white-crested turaco)
          - Tauraco sensu stricto
            - - Tauraco emini (eastern black-billed turaco) (Note: Elevation of former subspecies to new species proposed because Tauraco schuettii was found to be polyphyletic.)
              - Tauraco hartlaubi (Hartlaub's turaco)
              - - Tauraco persa (Guinea turaco or eastern green turaco)
                - Tauraco buffoni (western green turaco)
              - - - Tauraco fischeri (Fischer's turaco)
                  - Tauraco reichenowi (Reichenow's turaco) (Note: Elevation of former subspecies to new species proposed because Tauraco livingstonii was found to be polyphyletic.)
                - - Tauraco corythaix (Knysna turaco)
                  - Tauraco livingstonii (Livingstone's turaco)
            - - Tauraco schuettii (black-billed turaco)
              - - Tauraco chalcolophus (Ngorongoro turaco) (Note: Proposed species split of Tauraco schalowi complex into four species based on phylogenetic species principle.)
                - - Tauraco schalowi (Schalow's turaco)
                  - - Tauraco marungensis (Zambia turaco)
                    - Tauraco loitanus (Loita turaco)

=== Species ===
The species of Musophagidae, arranged in taxonomic sequence and Paleofile.com websites are:

Order Musophagiformes Seebohm 1890

- Genus †Foro Olson, 1992?
  - †F. panarium Olson, 1992
- Family Musophagidae Lesson 1828 [Apopempsidae Brodkorb, 1971b; Veflintornithidae Kašin, 1976]
  - Genus †Veflintornis Kašin 1976 [Apopempsis Brodkorb 1971 non Schenkling 1903]
    - †V. meini (Ballmann 1969) Kašin 1976 [Musophaga meini Ballmann 1969; Apopempsis meini (Ballmann 1969) Brodkorb 1971]
    - †V. africanus (Harrison 1980) [Musophaga africanus Harrison 1980; Apopempsis africanus (Harrison 1980)]
  - Subfamily Corythaeolinae
    - Genus Corythaeola Heine 1860
      - Great blue turaco, Corythaeola cristata (Vieillot 1816) Heine 1860
  - Subfamily Criniferinae
    - Genus Crinifer
      - Western plantain-eater, Crinifer piscator (Boddaert 1783)
      - Eastern plantain-eater, Crinifer zonurus (Rüppell 1835)
      - White-bellied go-away-bird, Crinifer leucogaster (Rüppell 1842) Roberts 1926
      - Grey go-away-bird, Crinifer concolor
      - Bare-faced go-away-bird, Crinifer personatus
  - Subfamily Musophaginae
    - Genus Gallirex
      - Purple-crested turaco, Gallirex porphyreolophus
      - Rwenzori turaco, Gallirex johnstoni
    - Genus Menelikornis
      - White-cheeked turaco, Menelikornis leucotis (Rüppell 1835)
      - Ruspoli's turaco, Menelikornis ruspolii Salvadori 1896
    - Genus Tauraco
      - Bannerman's turaco, Tauraco bannermani (Bates 1923)
      - White-crested turaco, Tauraco leucolophus (Heuglin 1855)
      - Red-crested turaco, Tauraco erythrolophus (Vieillot 1819)
      - Guinea turaco, Tauraco persa (Linnaeus 1758)
      - Knysna turaco, Tauraco corythaix (Wagler 1827)
      - Livingstone's turaco, Tauraco livingstonii Gray 1864
      - Fischer's turaco, Tauraco fischeri (Reichenow 1878)
      - Black-billed turaco, Tauraco schuettii (Cabanis 1879)
      - Schalow's turaco, Tauraco schalowi (Reichenow 1891)
      - Hartlaub's turaco, Tauraco hartlaubi (Fischer & Reichenow 1884)
      - Yellow-billed turaco, Tauraco macrorhynchus (Fraser 1839)
      - Violet turaco, Tauraco violaceus Isert 1788
      - Ross's turaco, Tauraco rossae Gould 1852

== Interaction with humans ==
The crimson flight feathers of turacos have been treasured as status symbols to royalty and paramount chiefs all over Africa. They are recorded as being valued by the Swazi and Zulu royal families. British ornithologist Constantine Walter Benson, who collected heavily in Africa, is alleged to have tasted every species he collected; he claimed that turacos tasted the best.

== General and cited references ==
- Ballmann, Peter (1969). "Les Oiseaux miocènes de la Grive-Saint-Alban (Isère) [The Miocene birds of Grive-Saint-Alban, Isère]". Geobios. 2: 157–204. doi:10.1016/S0016-6995(69)80005-7. (French with English abstract)
- Hughes, Janice M.; Baker, Allan J. (1999). "Phylogenetic relationships of the enigmatic hoatzin (Opisthocomus hoazin) resolved using mitochondrial and nuclear gene sequences" (PDF). Molecular Biology and Evolution. 16 (9): 1300–1307. doi:10.1093/oxfordjournals.molbev.a026220. PMID 10486983.
- International Turaco Society (Magazines 1993–2012), also website 2001, turacos.org
- Mlíkovský, Jirí (2002): Cenozoic Birds of the World, Part 1: Europe. Ninox Press, Prague. ISBN 80-901105-3-8 PDF fulltext
- Newton, Alfred (1911). "Touracou" . In Chisholm, Hugh (ed.). Encyclopædia Britannica. Vol. 27 (11th ed.). Cambridge University Press. p. 102. This is based on a now outdated classification, but does provide a detailed description of the morphology of some species.
- Sorenson, Michael D.; Oneal, Elen; García-Moreno, Jaime; Mindell, David P. (2003). "More Taxa, More Characters: The Hoatzin Problem Is Still Unresolved". Molecular Biology and Evolution. 20 (9): 1484–1499. doi:10.1093/molbev/msg157. PMID 12777516. S2CID 24173060. Supplementary Material.
