= Chirinda Forest Botanical Reserve =

Botanical Reserve in Manicaland, Zimbabwe

- Chirinda State Forest
- IUCN category Ib (wilderness area)
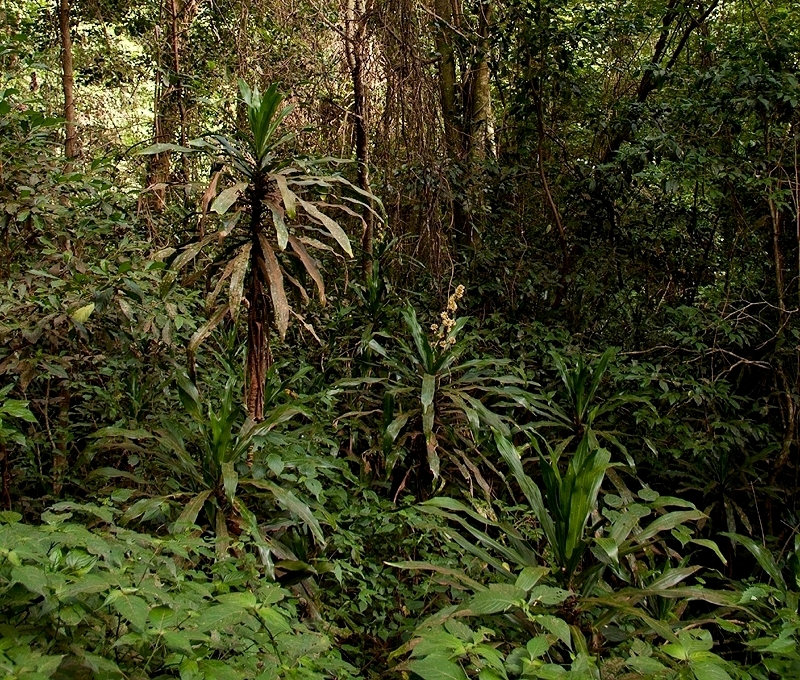
- Forest dracaena (Dracaena fragrans) in the understorey of the forest

- Location within Zimbabwe
- Location: Chipinge District, Manicaland, Zimbabwe
- Nearest city: Chipinge
- Coordinates: 20°25′27″S 32°41′40″E
- Area: 9.5 km^{2} (3.7 sq mi)
- Designated: 1951

The 950 hectares (2,300 acres) Chirinda Forest Botanical Reserve is situated on the slopes of Mount Selinda, 30 km (19 miles) south of Chipinge, in the Chipinge Highlands of Manicaland, Zimbabwe, and is administered by the Forestry Commission. The reserve is situated at between 900 and 1,200 m (3,000 and 3,900 ft) in elevation, and receives some 1,370 mm (54 in) to 1,466 mm (57.7 in) of annual rainfall. 606 hectares (1,500 acres) of its higher levels, above 1,076 m (3,530 ft), is covered by moist evergreen forest, specifically Zanzibar-Inhambane transitional rain forest, of which it represents the southernmost occurrence. The headwaters of three streams, namely the Zona, Chinyika and Musangazi, drain the two broad highlands which it encloses. The boundaries of the reserve are not strictly enforced, so that cattle grazing and plant harvesting are ongoing. The reserve is surrounded by communal settlements, commercial timber plantations (eucalypts and pines) and small-scale commercial farming units. The naturalist Charles Swynnerton was appointed manager of the nearby Gungunyana farm in 1900, and a number of plant, bird and insect names commemorate his collecting activities of the next two decades. Chirinda means "lookout" or "vantage point" in the chiNdau language, or perhaps "place of refuge".

== Ecology ==
The medium elevation forest is likely the southernmost patch of subtropical rainforest in Africa. Phytogeographically it is classed as Afromontane forest, but with lowland and Guineo-Congolian elements. It is situated on two hill tops on dolerite-derived soils, and Müller (1991) proposed that these soil types determine its extent. Goldsmith (1876) however suggested that it is only a relic of a once much larger forest which has been reduced by gradual climatic changes in a few hundred years.

Year-round moisture, in the form of rain, mist or dew, provides for a substantial and intact moist leaf litter layer, on which its ecological processes depend. Decomposition is fungal, and not by termites or similar insects as would be the case in drier woodlands of the region. Several tree species bear fleshy fruit, resulting in a good representation of mammal and bird frugivores, which impact both negatively and positively on seed dispersal. Much of the fauna shows affinities to forests elsewhere, particularly those at lower elevations along the East Africa coastal plains.

== Protection ==
Protection from fires is expected to facilitate the regeneration and expansion of the forest. During his time of residence, Swynnerton noted that recurring fires had been gradually reducing outlying forest patches. Destruction of portions of the Chipete and Chipungambira satellite forest patches occurred during the 1860s. It may have been aided by elephants which opened up forest, but more likely resulted from indigenous people who regularly cleared land by fire in spring time. Fire-resistant mobola plum and mahobohobo trees are pioneer species in such areas.

Maupare (1993) however noted that the forest boundary was stable and that former logging operations in the northern section had no lasting effect on the plant diversity. This extraction of red mahogany, peawood and tannodia during the 1940s also had little effect on its extent.

== Flora and fauna ==
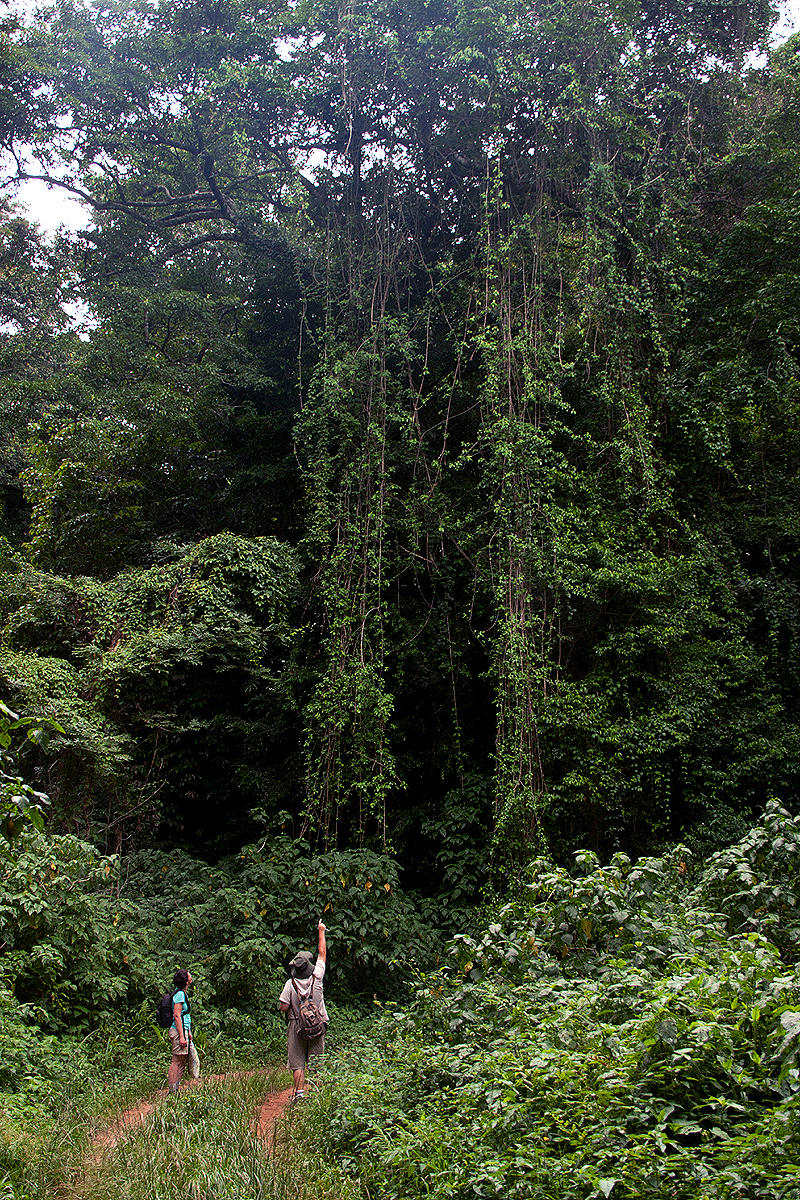
A forest tree draped in climbing nettle (Urera trinervis) in Chirinda Forest

The area is home to a high diversity of plants, fungi, birds, butterflies, insects and reptiles.

=== Flora ===
Rare tree species which seldom occur elsewhere in Zimbabwe include the fluted milkwood (dominant canopy species), Chirinda fig, undershrub big-leaf, Chirinda stinkwood, yellow bitterberry and forest strychnos. The type of the latter species was obtained in the forest by Swynnerton.

The dominant canopy species, besides fluted milkwood, are forest mahogany and peawood. The sub-canopy is occupied by tannodia, forest strychnos and forest ironplum. The Big Tree grows in the southern part of the reserve in the "Valley of the Giants". It is the largest red mahogany tree in southern Africa and the tallest native tree in Zimbabwe. The 600- to 1,000-year-old (some estimate 2,000-year-old) leviathan has a trunk diameter of about 6 metres. Other forest tree species include colossal specimens of strangling figs, brown mahogany, white stinkwood, forest climbing acacia, ironwood, giant diospyros, apricot vine, forest peach, forest rothmannia, strombosia and forest toad-tree. The forest edge is characterized by smooth-barked flat-crown, forest num-num, forest sword-leaf, horsewood, forest croton, climbing turkey-berry, Manica bride's bush, green flower tree, small-fruited teclea, elbow-leaf, mitzeerie, eastern blue-bush, magic guarri, orange-milk tree, lavender tree, mobola plum, wild currant and climbing orange are common species of the surrounding savannah.

Thousands of specimens of the yucca-like Dracaena fragrans populate the forest floor, and numerous ferns, creepers, vines, epiphytes and orchids (including Calanthe sylvatica) are to be found. Montbretia and flame lilies are also present, while guava, lantana and ginger are exotic invasive species.

=== Fauna ===
==== Mammals ====
Samango monkeys are regularly seen, and leopard on the odd occasion. The local races of the mutable sun squirrel (H. m. chirindensis) and red-bellied coast squirrel (i.e. Selinda mountain squirrel, P. p. swynnertoni) are mountain isolates. The Selinda veld rat occurs in tangled vegetation on rocky areas, and is only known from two other sites in Zimbabwe.

==== Birds ====
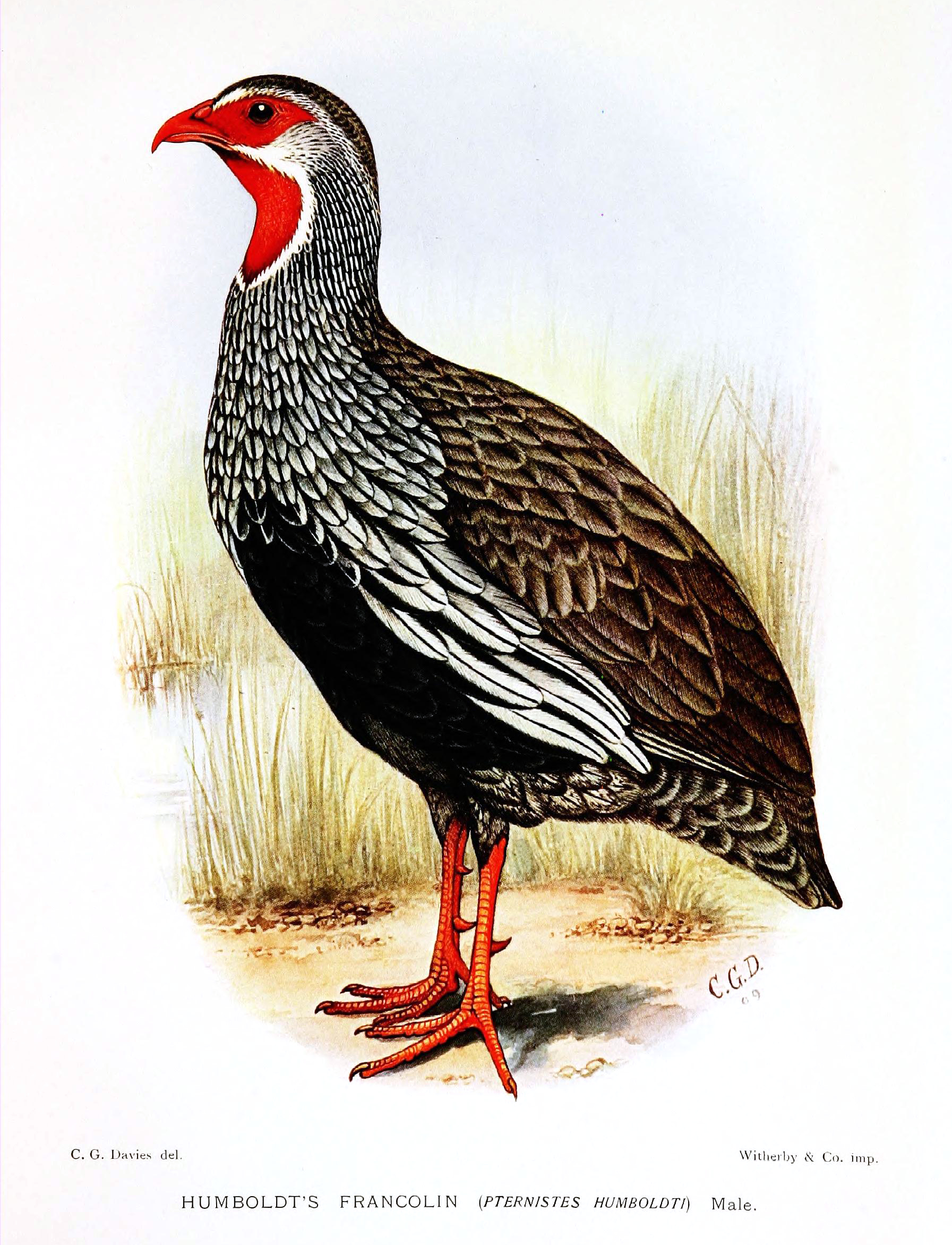
P. a. swynnertoni Sclater, 1921

A few highland bird species reach their southernmost occurrence here, namely the Chirinda apalis (type locality), Swynnerton's robin, a globally threatened monotypic genus, stripe-cheeked greenbul (A. m. disjunctus), moustached warbler (M. m. orientalis), white-tailed flycatcher and yellow-bellied waxbill. Wide-ranging African species include crowned eagle, trumpeter and silvery-cheeked hornbills, both breeders, Livingstone's turaco, lemon dove, green pigeon, owls, nightjars, bee-eaters, pygmy kingfisher, yellow-streaked (P. f. dendrophilus) and sombre greenbuls, yellow-throated (S. r. alacris), Barratt's (B. b. priesti) and broad-tailed warblers, olive and black-fronted bushshrikes, Cape batis, sunbirds and firefinches. Various bird races were first described from this location: a strikingly coloured race of red-necked spurfowl (P. a. swynnertoni), a fulvous-coloured race of wailing cisticola (C. l. mashona), a race of bar-throated apalis (A. t. arnoldi), the smallish, dusky and streaky-throated Swynnerton's thrush (T. o. swynnertoni) which is endemic to the Eastern Highlands, and a race of olive sunbird (C. o. sclateri). The forest is situated too low for orange thrush, Roberts's warbler, malachite or bronze sunbirds, and too high for yellow-spotted nicator, white-eared barbet or grey waxbill. Crested guineafowl however inhabits its lower elevations and green malkoha recently populated the forest from lower elevations. Blue-mantled flycatchers occupy the lower elevations or fringing thickets, but remain segregated from white-tailed flycatchers which occupy the forest proper or higher canopy.

==== Reptiles ====
The reptile fauna includes pythons, cobras, vipers, mambas, adders, chameleons, geckos, skinks and lizards. Marshall's leaf chameleon, an endemic of the Eastern Highlands, is found within the forest and along its margins. The type species C. swynnertoni of the worm lizard genus Chirindia was described from this locality, while another worm lizard, Zygaspis ferox, is endemic to the forest and its vicinity.

==== Amphibians ====
The types of Broadley's forest treefrog, Hewitt's long-nosed frog and the Chirinda toad were obtained in the forest. The Chirinda toad is known from Chirinda and the forest north of Dombé in adjacent Mozambique. It is a terrestrial species that lives on leaf-litter, and takes refuge under rotten logs.

==== Insects ====
The Mount Selinda acraea mimic butterfly (Mimacraea neokoton) is found nowhere else. The type of the ebony bush brown was obtained from Chirinda forest, and it is also known from the Vumba. It flies all year and has distinct seasonal forms. The Chirinda bush brown is named for the forest, but it is in fact a widespread species. Its type was obtained at an unknown location in the Eastern Highlands, and it is distinguished from the previous species by its lighter upperside ground colour, and the contrasting hair-pencils of the male.

== Facilities ==
The well-marked route to the campsite leaves the main road just east of the mission hospital in Mount Selinda. It is located 4 km into the forest, and also has chalets with clean facilities and braai stands.

== Site locations ==
- Big Tree, Valley of the Giants 20°26′29″S 32°42′15″E
- Chipete forest 20°24′40″S 32°42′46″E
- Chirinda forest campsite 20°24′37″S 32°41′57″E
- Gungunyana farm 20°24′29″S 32°43′09″E
- Swynnerton memorial 20°25′18″S 32°41′56″E

== See also ==
- Allophylus chirindensis
- Anthene chirinda
- Chirinda wild medlar
- Neoceratitis chirinda
- Plectranthus swynnertonii, type locality
- Rhus chirindensis
- Reptiles and frogs of the Eastern Highlands
