= Mount Selinda =

Village in Zimbabwe

Mount Selinda, at an altitude of 1,100 metres, is a village and mission station in the province of Manicaland in the eastern mountains of Zimbabwe. Located close to the Mozambique border, it lies in an area of outstanding natural beauty. Mount Selinda sits on an east-facing slope, on the very edge of the Chirinda Forest Botanical Reserve – the southernmost tropical rainforest in Africa.

The dominant people of the area are the Ndau tribe, who claim close links with the Zulu tribe of South Africa. Their language is chiNdau. Most of them live by subsistence farming.

== Bhodho Nathan ==
For centuries, the local Ndau people have called the Mount Selinda area "Chirinda", meaning "lookout" or "vantage point", and certainly the etymology of this name becomes abundantly clear when standing on the western slopes of Mount Selinda, with sweeping views for miles around. The Shangani people to the south pronounced Chirinda as "Silinda" and the name "Selinda" is clearly an English corruption of the Shangani word. The first mention of the name "Mount Selinda" appears to have been in the late nineteenth century when the land in the area was claimed by European settlers. The American Board of Commissioners for Foreign Missions approached Cecil John Rhodes of the British South Africa Company, seeking land on which to establish their mission. Rhodes himself granted them land in the Chirinda area, much of the land situated on an already-existing farm called Mount Selinda. Although there are no documents in the Deeds Office reflecting it, it would appear that a Mr. Steyn occupied the farm at the time and sold it to the mission for a sum of £300 (three hundred pounds). In 1892 a Mr Wilder, Mr Bunker and Mr Thompson commenced the establishment of the Mount Silinda Mission (historically the name Silinda was adopted by the mission and the name Selinda was the name of the farm). But it was not until 1901 that the American Board Mission finally obtained legal possession of the farm Mount Selinda under Pioneer Title.

== Geography ==
Mount Selinda lies at the southern end of a mountain range which separates Zimbabwe from neighbouring Mozambique. This range, hundreds of kilometres long, runs in a north–south direction, with the Nyanga mountains lying at the northern extremity. Mount Selinda itself consists of two large, densely forested hills which rise up from the mountain plateau, with the two hills possessing a gentle but distinct saddle between them. No other high ground stands between Mount Selinda and the Indian Ocean some 400 kilometres away – a major factor influencing Mount Selinda's wet climate. To the north east of Chirinda Forest lies the Ngungunyana Forest and eucalyptus plantation C. To the east of Mount Selinda the land descends gradually into Mozambique, while to the west of Mount Selinda the geography changes suddenly and dramatically. After some 30 km the mountain range plunges down to the flat, arid lowlands of the Sabi River Valley where, in searing summer temperatures of 40 °C and higher, heat-tolerant baobab, acacia and mopane trees abound.

Only one tarred road, single track, potholed, and in a poor state of repair, penetrates the area, the other tarred roads having long since crumbled away. Numerous earth roads provide access from all directions.

== Climate ==
The climate of Mount Selinda is humid subtropical, being greatly influenced by warm, moist air originating from the Indian Ocean, moving west across Mozambique and condensing as it rises up into the Eastern Highlands of Zimbabwe. As a result of this year-round moisture, Mount Selinda is evergreen and does not experience the arid winters found in the rest of southern Africa. Mount Selinda's weather is also influenced by its proximity to Chirinda Forest – the forest acting as a sponge and holding vast quantities of moisture. Summers are warm and humid and winters are cool and humid. Temperatures rarely rise beyond 30 degrees Celsius in summer and light frost can occur in the surrounding low-lying areas in winter. Whilst the climate of Mount Selinda can be precisely and accurately described, actual available weather records for Mount Selinda are not comprehensive. From available information however, the following data may be gleaned.

=== Rainfall ===
Historical records beginning in 1911 (with a break during the 1970s) reveal an average yearly rainfall of almost 1,500 millimetres. The highest annual rainfall recorded during this period was 3,699 millimetres in a twelve-month period from 1917 to 1918, and the lowest rainfall recorded was 757 millimetres during a twelve-month period from 1940 to 1941. It must be emphasised that these are only rainfall figures and as such they do not include the vast quantities of precipitation which routinely descend upon Mount Selinda in the form of mist, fog, low cloud and heavy night-time dew.

Whilst a rain gauge (unfortunately sited in the lee of forest trees) is in use in the Chirinda Forest Campsite, and whilst there is a basic meteorological unit at the Mount Selinda High School, it is not clear whether any accurate weather data has been documented or made available to the public in Mount Selinda in more recent years.

A serious drought that affected the whole of Zimbabwe, including Mount Selinda, from 2013 finally ended with the onset of the rainy season at the end of 2016.

== Geology ==
Phyllitic mudstones (phyllite being a fine-grained metamorphic rock) and fine-grained to medium-grained feldspathic sandstones lie atop an igneous base of dolerites, and it is from these dolerites that much of the soils in the area are formed. These soils are a rich red-brown, fine-grained, sandy clay which, in turn, are under-laid by ferralithic clay. The soils of the Mount Selinda area are typically deep and fertile.

== Flora and fauna ==
The Mount Selinda area is home to a staggering array of indigenous African flora, fungi, birds, butterflies, insects and reptiles. This is mainly due to its position adjoining the Chirinda Forest Botanical Reserve which is protected by law. Among the hundreds of indigenous trees found in Mount Selinda are Red mahogany, Brown mahogany, Natal mahogany, Albizia, Forest Newtonia (Newtonia buchananii), Big Leaf, White stinkwood, Chirinda stinkwood, Ironwood and colossal specimens of strangling figs. The largest Red Mahogany tree in southern Africa, a 1,000- to 2,000-year-old leviathan with a trunk diameter of some 6 metres stands at Mount Selinda. Other smaller flora include thousands of specimens of the yucca-like Dracaena fragrans, numerous ferns, creepers, vines, epiphytes, montbretia, orchids and flame lilies. Due to its proximity to the botanical reserve, Mount Selinda boasts a dazzling array of bird life, with Trumpeter hornbills, Livingstone's turaco, African pygmy kingfishers, Firefinches, Sunbirds, African green pigeons, Owls, Nightjars, Narina Trogon, Eagles and Bee-eaters. The sheer variety and brilliant colours of butterflies in the area is also noteworthy. Samango monkeys are often seen in the area. The reptile population consists of, amongst others, pythons, cobras, vipers, mambas, adders, chameleons, geckos, skinks and lizards. The endemic chameleon Marshall's leaf chameleon, Rhampholeon marshalli, is found within the forest and at the forest margin and it is scattered sparsely in suitable forest habitat throughout the mountains of the Eastern Highlands.

== Agriculture ==
Avocadoes, tea, bananas, sweet potatoes, taro, citrus, pineapples, sugar cane, coffee, macadamia nuts and commercial timbers (eucalyptus, wattle and pine) are grown in the area. Dairy farming has declined in recent years.

== Facilities ==
Formal education facilities are provided by the Mount Selinda Primary School, Mount Selinda Secondary School and the School of Nursing at the Mount Selinda Hospital. Two kilometres to the west of Mount Selinda lies the small township of Chako, which is the nearest commercial centre comprising a post office, basic grocery shops, general dealers, a small market, butcher shops, carpenters and liquor outlets. In the Chirinda Forest Nature Reserve there is tourist accommodation in the form of three thatched, serviced chalets and a camping site. The single-track, tar road from the town of Chipinge to the north ends at Mount Selinda, with an earth road continuing eight kilometres to the Mount Selinda border post, which has immigration and customs facilities for those wishing to enter and exit Mozambique.

== Mission history ==
In 1919 Emory Alvord, arrived at the Mount Selinda Mission and taught western farming methods to the local population. He also established the Nyanyadzi irrigation scheme in Zimbabwe's hot, lowland area. The United Church of Christ in Zimbabwe (UCCZ) also facilitated the establishment of the Nyanyadzi irrigation scheme.

The mission church was established and staffed by the American Board Mission and it had satellite churches at Beacon Hill, Emerald Hill and Muzite. The Mount Selinda Institute is a sister institution to the Chikore Mission ( 20°26′13″S 32°29′52″E, approximately 30 km north west of Mount Selinda)

The institute has historical monuments like the 'catapilla' earth mover known by the locals as 'Gandapasi', the brick moulding machine and the first building constructed from bricks and tiles in the Melsetter district of Manicaland.

Today the Mission Station comprises a church, a primary school, a secondary school with boarding facilities, a farm, a grinding mill and the Willis F. Pierce Memorial Hospital which is also known as Mount Selinda Hospital. The boarding school accommodates both boys and girls. The Mission Hospital trains midwives and primary care nurses. In its grounds is situated the Daisy Dube Orphanage.
