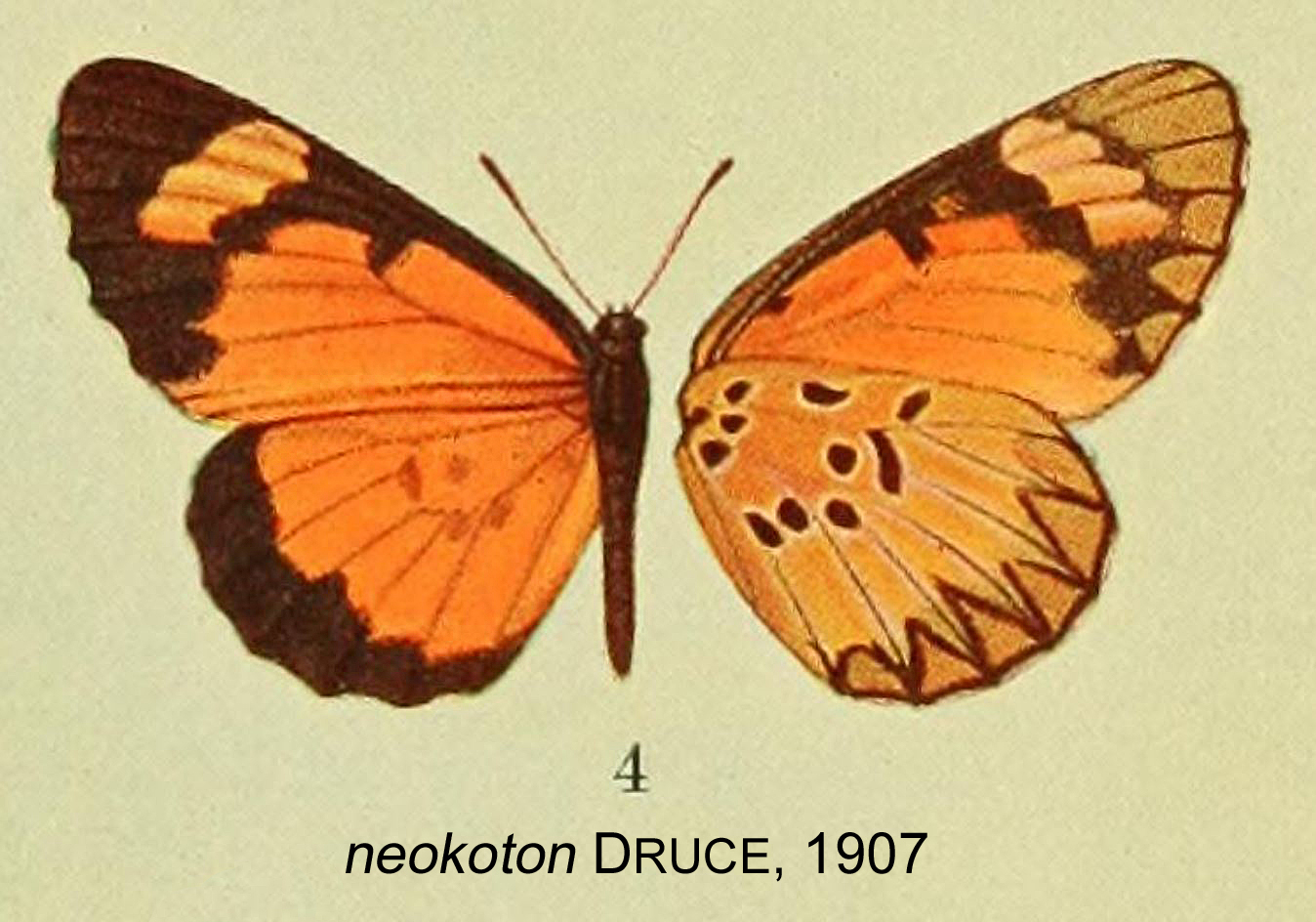

Scientific classification
- Domain: Eukaryota
- Kingdom: Animalia
- Phylum: Arthropoda
- Class: Insecta
- Order: Lepidoptera
- Family: Lycaenidae
- Genus: Mimacraea
- Species: M. neokoton

Binomial name
- Mimacraea neokoton Druce, 1907

= Mimacraea neokoton =

Species of butterfly

Mimacraea neokoton, the Mount Selinda acraea mimic, is a butterfly in the family Lycaenidae. It is found at Chirinda Forest near Mount Selinda in eastern Zimbabwe. The habitat consists of forests.

Adults are on wing from late February to early March.

The larvae feed on very dark, blue-green (black) algae (Cyanophyta).
