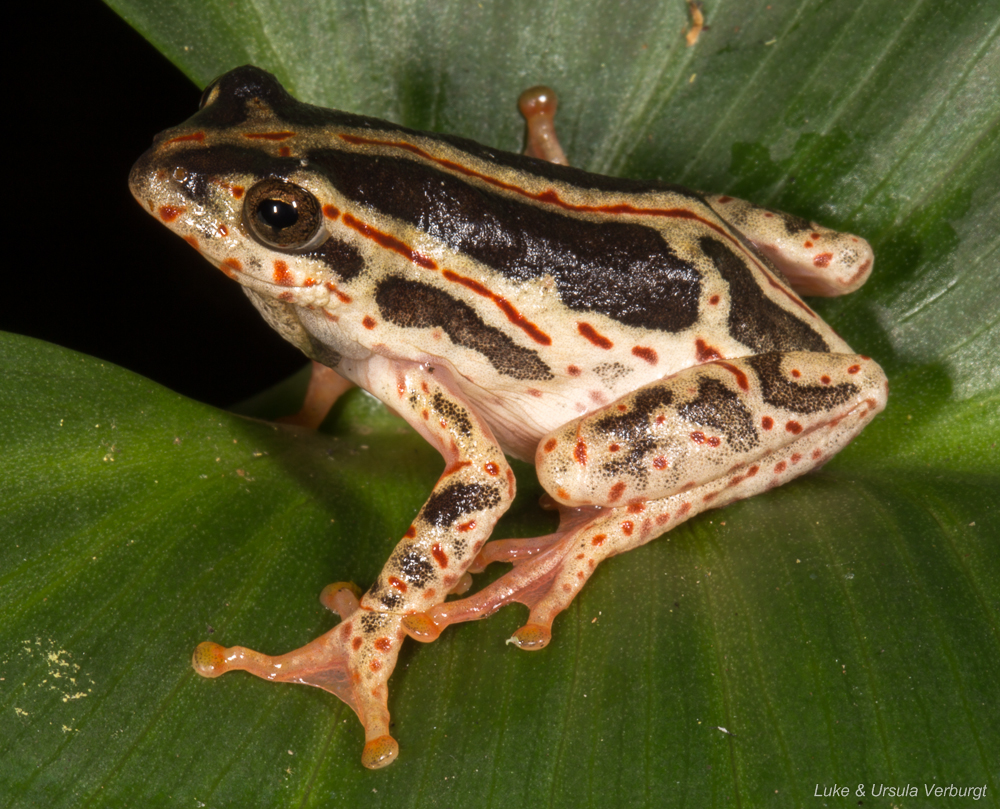

Conservation status
- Least Concern (IUCN 3.1)

Scientific classification
- Kingdom: Animalia
- Phylum: Chordata
- Class: Amphibia
- Order: Anura
- Family: Hyperoliidae
- Genus: Hyperolius
- Species: H. swynnertoni

Binomial name
- Hyperolius swynnertoni FitzSimons, 1941

Synonyms
- Hyperolius marmoratus swynnertoni — Laurent, 1952 "1951"; Hyperolius marmoratus broadleyi Poynton, 1963; Hyperolius marginatus broadleyi — Laurent, 1976<

= Hyperolius swynnertoni =

Species of frog

Hyperolius swynnertoni is a species of frog in the family Hyperoliidae. It is found in the southern portion of the eastern Zimbabwe uplands and adjacent Mozambique. It is also known as the Swynnerton's reed frog, with the subspecies "broadleyi" (if recognized) as the Broadley's tree frog or Broadley's forest treefrog.

== Taxonomy and systematics ==
Hyperolius swynnertoni was described by Vivian Frederick Maynard FitzSimons in 1941, based on material collected from Chirinda Forest near Mount Selinda, Zimbabwe. The forest was largely on farm of Mr C. M. F. Swynnerton, after which the species is named. Hyperolius swynnertoni is part of the Hyperolius viridiflavus superspecies, and it might better be treated as a subspecies rather than a full species.

== Description ==
Adult males reach 32 mm (1.3 in) and adult females 35 mm (1.4 in) in snout–vent length; it is among the larger Hyperolius species. The dorsal colour pattern in the type series consists of dark vermiculations on a pale background, or sometimes pale stippling on a dark background. Hyperolius marmoratus broadleyi, which may or may not be synonymous with this species, has a light mid-dorsal band running the whole length of the animal, and a pair of dorso-lateral light bands running from edge of upper eyelid and upper half of eye to base of leg. The latter are laterally bordered by a dark band. The light bands have usually a red line in the centre and are separated by a broad dark band running from canthus rostralis over upper eyelid almost to vent. These patterns are variable even within populations, including the bands curving or breaking into discontinuous lines or spots.

== Habitat and conservation ==
Hyperolius swynnertoni is associated with emergent vegetation at the margins of swamps, rivers and lakes in savannas, grasslands and forest edges, as well as many human-modified habitats such as cultivated land and gardens. Breeding takes in a variety of aquatic habitats, both temporary and permanent, ranging from very small to very large ponds. The eggs are laid directly into the water.

Hyperolius swynnertoni is an extremely abundant and adaptable species that spreads rapidly into recently created waterbodies; there are no significant threats. It presumably occurs in the Gungunyana Forest Reserve.
