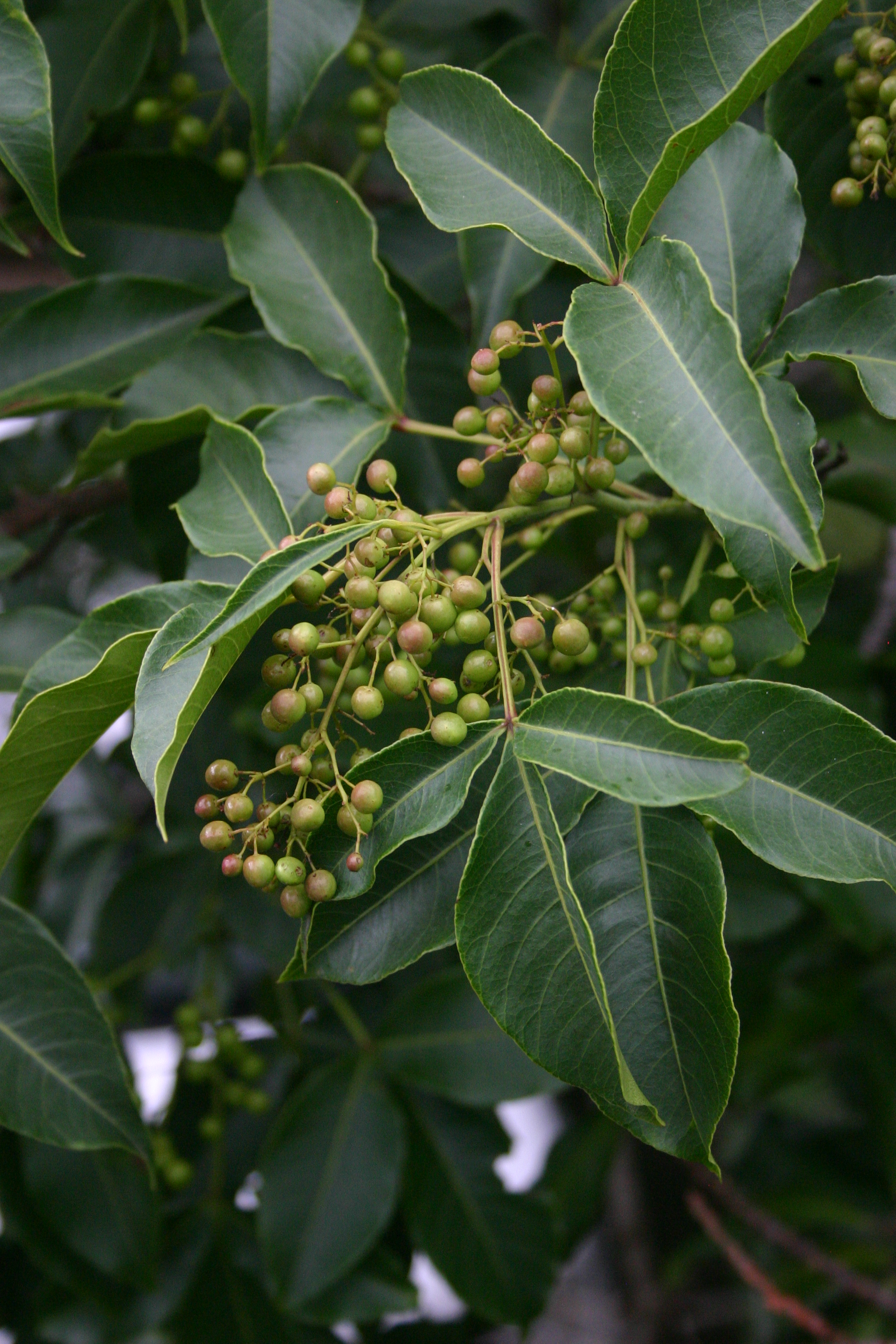
- Foliage and fruit

Scientific classification
- Kingdom: Plantae
- Clade: Tracheophytes
- Clade: Angiosperms
- Clade: Eudicots
- Clade: Rosids
- Order: Sapindales
- Family: Anacardiaceae
- Genus: Searsia
- Species: S. chirindensis

Binomial name
- Searsia chirindensis (Baker f.) Moffett

Synonyms
- Rhus chirindensis Baker f.; Rhus legatii Schonl.

= Searsia chirindensis =

African tree species

Searsia chirindensis is a medium-sized, semi-deciduous, trifoliate Southern African dioecious tree of up to 10 m tall, rarely 20 m, often multi-stemmed, occurring along the coastal belt from the Cape, through KwaZulu/Natal, Eswatini, Zimbabwe and Mozambique as far north as Tanzania, and growing in a wide variety of habitats such as open woodlands, in forests, along forest margins, in the open, among rocks and on mountain slopes. It was named by Swynnerton from a specimen collected by him near the Chirinda Forest in the Chipinge District of Southern Rhodesia. This is one of more than a hundred southern African species in the genus. It is commonly known as red currant because of a fancied resemblance of the fruit to that of the European redcurrant.

Branches dull brown or blackish (when dried), cylindric, pubescent or glabrous. Petiole 1·5–6·5 cm. long, almost cylindric, narrowly canaliculate and marginate above, pubescent or glabrous. Leaflets ± dull red-brown, ovate or ovate-lanceolate, acuminate (acumen flat or sometimes falcate, very acute, apiculate), entire and ± undulate at the margin, membranous to ± rigid or subcoriaceous, glabrous or ± pubescent on the margin, midrib and nerves; median leaflet (3)6–13(16) × (1·2)2·5–4(7) cm., cuneate and frequently petiolulate at the base, the lateral ones (2)2·5–7(12) × (0·8)1·3–3·5(5·5) cm., asymmetric and slightly cuneate or somewhat rounded at the base, very shortly petiolulate to sessile; midrib slightly raised in the upper surface, very prominent below; lateral nerves arcuate, slender, raised on both sides, reticulation lax, almost invisible or sometimes conspicuous. Panicles terminal and axillary, ample, pyramidal, much branched, multiflorous, the terminal ones longer than the leaves, the axillary ones as long as the latter or somewhat longer; pedicels 1–2·5 mm. long. Male flowers: calyx-segments 0·5 mm. long, ovate, obtuse, glabrous; petals c. 1·5 mm. long, elliptic, obtuse; filaments c. 1 mm. long. Female flowers: ovary ovoid; styles reflexed; disk cupuliform, 5-lobulate; staminodes present. Drupe pinkish-yellow to reddish-brown, shining, (4)5(6) mm. in diam., globose, glabrous.

— Rosette Fernandes, Abílio Fernandes in Flora Zambesiaca

== Traditional medicinal uses ==
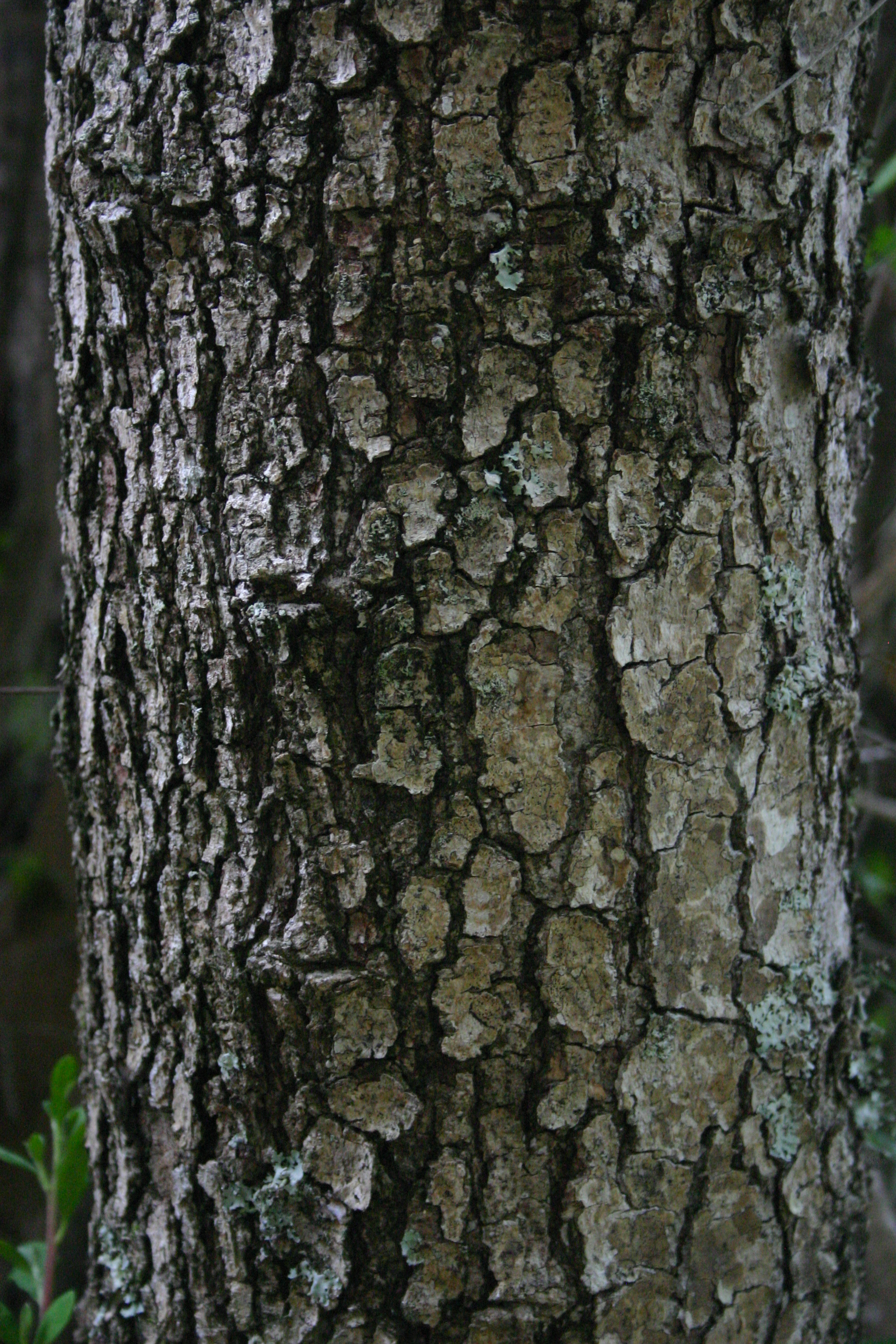

Laboratory studies of bark extracts from this species show properties that may be useful in the treatment of convulsions and epilepsy, supporting its traditional use in ethnic medicine in some rural communities of South Africa.
