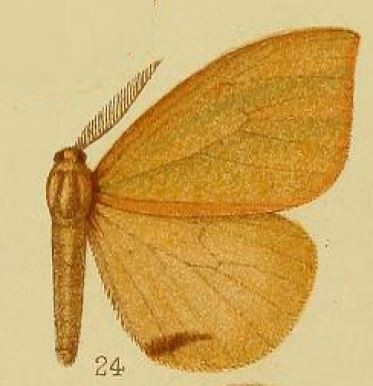
- Heteronygmia strigitorna

Scientific classification
- Kingdom: Animalia
- Phylum: Arthropoda
- Class: Insecta
- Order: Lepidoptera
- Superfamily: Noctuoidea
- Family: Erebidae
- Tribe: Lymantriini
- Genus: Heteronygmia; Holland, 1893

= Heteronygmia =

Genus of moths

Heteronygmia is a genus of moths in the subfamily Lymantriinae. The genus was erected by William Jacob Holland in 1893.

== Species ==
The following species are recognised:

- Heteronygmia chismona
- Heteronygmia dissimilis
- Heteronygmia flavescens
- Heteronygmia leucogyna
- Heteronygmia manicata
- Heteronygmia opalescens
- Heteronygmia rhodapicata
- Heteronygmia rufescens
- Heteronygmia strigitorna
