= Heteronygmia dissimilis =

Scientific classification
- Kingdom: Animalia
- Phylum: Arthropoda
- Class: Insecta
- Order: Lepidoptera
- Superfamily: Noctuoidea
- Family: Erebidae
- Genus: Heteronygmia
- Species: H. dissimilis

Binomial name
- Heteronygmia dissimilis (Aurivillius, 1910)

Synonyms
- Lymantria dissimilis Aurivillius, 1910

Species of moth

Heteronygmia dissimilis is a species of moth in the subfamily Lymantriinae first described by Per Olof Christopher Aurivillius in 1910. It is native to Africa. The adult moth is on wing from February to November, but is most common between June and September. The larvae feed on the foliage of the East African mahogany and when they are plentiful, they can defoliate the tree.

== Description ==
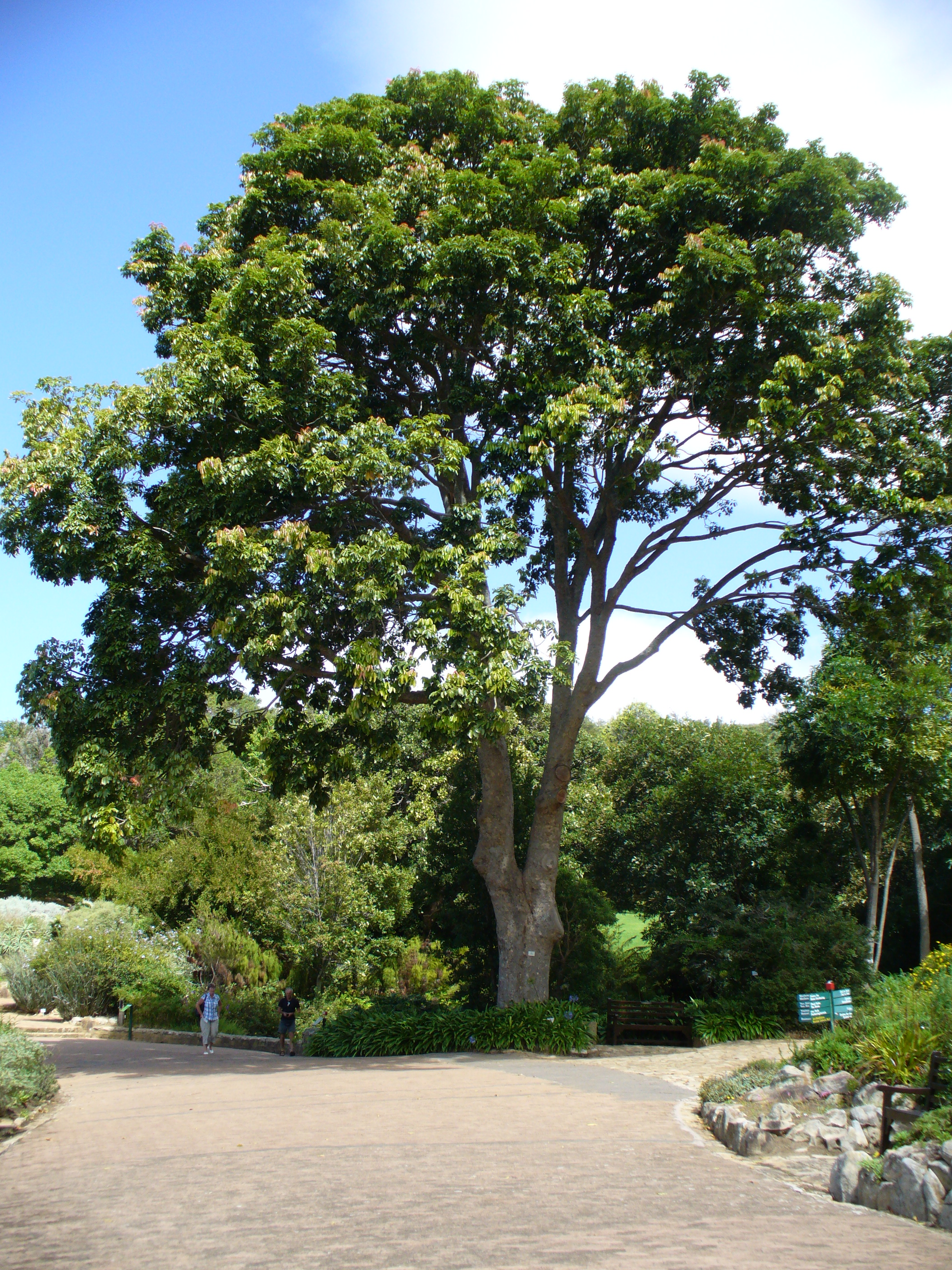
East African mahogany, the food plant of the caterpillar

The male has a wingspan of about 40 mm (1.6 in) and is a strong flier. It has large feathery antennae and a slender abdomen, and is some shade of brown or reddish brown. The female is larger and stouter with a wingspan of about 50 mm (2.0 in). It is whitish or cream and is a poor flier. Both sexes have faint greyish lines on the wings, and a black spot on the forewing. The caterpillars are hairy and the last instar has two colour morphs; the less common form being pale green while the other form is camouflaged in brown, grey and white to resemble bark, and has up to three dark-coloured bars.

== Ecology ==
The eggs are laid in clusters of up to 130 on the bark of mahogany trees in the genus Khaya such as the East African mahogany (Khaya anthotheca). The eggs are glossy and globular, about 1 mm (0.04 in) in diameter, and hatch in about six days. The larvae are solitary and move up the tree to feed on the foliage. The early instars feed on mature leaves by night, skeletonising them, and hide on the underside of the leaves by day. Later instars spend the night feeding on leaves and hide in the day on the lower part of the tree trunk. The larvae do not consume freshly unfurled growth. Males have five instar stages while females have six, each lasting five or six days. The pupae may be concealed behind flakes of bark or be loosely tied with silk and hidden among the foliage. The adults of this species are nocturnal.

== Subspecies ==
- Heteronygmia dissimilis dissimilis
- Heteronygmia dissimilis rufescens Hering, 1926
