= Craibia atlantica =

Conservation status
- Vulnerable (IUCN 2.3)

Scientific classification
- Kingdom: Plantae
- Clade: Tracheophytes
- Clade: Angiosperms
- Clade: Eudicots
- Clade: Rosids
- Order: Fabales
- Family: Fabaceae
- Subfamily: Faboideae
- Genus: Craibia
- Species: C. atlantica

Binomial name
- Craibia atlantica Dunn

Species of legume

Craibia atlantica is a small tree of the family Fabaceae. It is endemic to coastal areas of tropical West Africa, also growing inland along riverbanks, and is found in Cameroon, Côte d'Ivoire, Nigeria, and Ghana. It is threatened by habitat loss.
