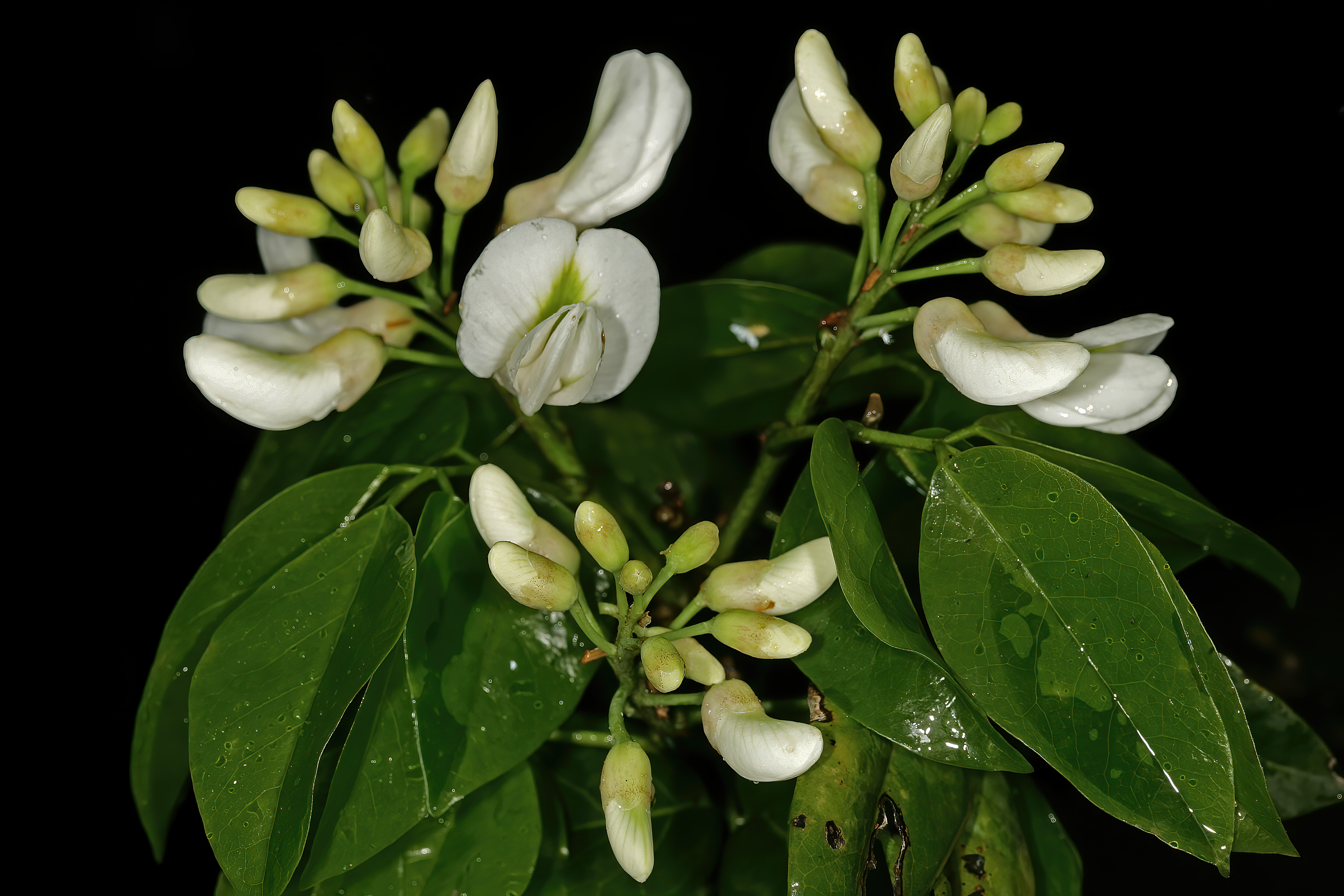
- Craibia zimmermannii

Scientific classification
- Kingdom: Plantae
- Clade: Tracheophytes
- Clade: Angiosperms
- Clade: Eudicots
- Clade: Rosids
- Order: Fabales
- Family: Fabaceae
- Subfamily: Faboideae
- Clade: Millettioids
- Tribe: Millettieae
- Genus: Craibia; Harms & Dunn (1911)

Species
- 9; see text

= Craibia =

Genus of legumes

Craibia is a genus of flowering plants in the family Fabaceae. It contains nine species native to sub-Saharan Africa, ranging from Liberia east to the Horn of Africa and south to the Cape Provinces of South Africa.

Craibia was named for William Grant Craib (1882–1933), a British botanist who was an Assistant for India at Kew and a professor at Aberdeen University, the author of Contributions to the Flora of Siam (1912) and Florae siamensis enumeratio (1925). The genus Craibia was published in 1911 by British botanist Stephen Troyte Dunn.

== Species ==
Nine species are accepted:

- Craibia affinis (De Wild.) De Wild.
- Craibia atlantica Dunn
- Craibia brevicaudata (Vatke) Dunn
- Craibia brownii Dunn
- Craibia grandiflora (Micheli) Baker f.
- Craibia laurentii (De Wild.) De Wild.
- Craibia lujae De Wild.
- Craibia simplex Dunn
- Craibia zimmermannii (Harms) Dunn
