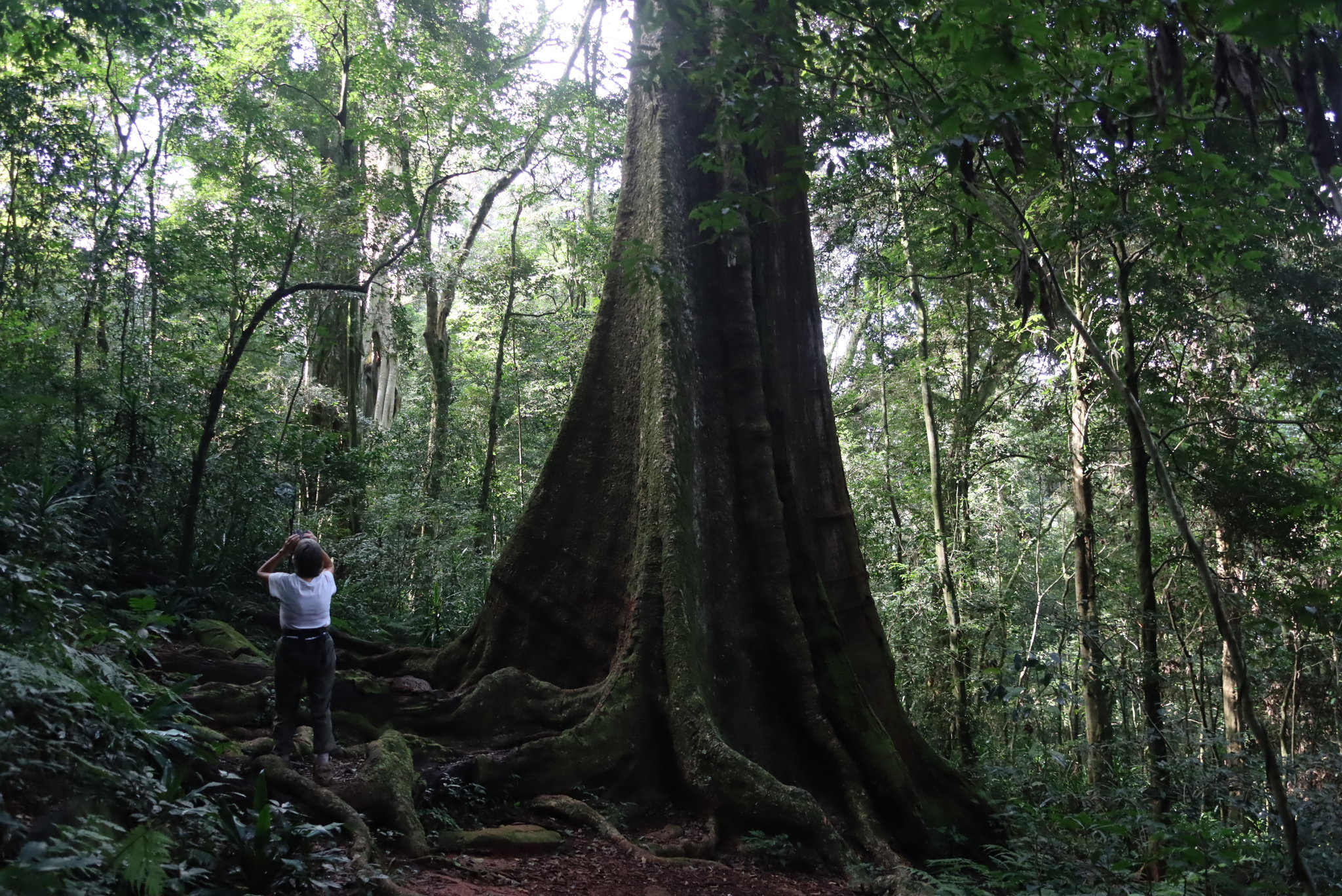
- Khaya anthotheca 'Big Tree', Chirinda Forest, Zimbabwe

Conservation status
- Vulnerable (IUCN 2.3)

Scientific classification
- Kingdom: Plantae
- Clade: Tracheophytes
- Clade: Angiosperms
- Clade: Eudicots
- Clade: Rosids
- Order: Sapindales
- Family: Meliaceae
- Genus: Khaya
- Species: K. anthotheca

Binomial name
- Khaya anthotheca (Welw.) C.DC.

Synonyms
- Khaya nyasica Stapf ex Baker f. (1911)

= Khaya anthotheca =

Species of tree

Khaya anthotheca, with the common name East African mahogany, is a large tree species in the Meliaceae family, native to tropical Africa.

The name anthotheca was taken from the Greek word anthos, meaning flower, while theca refers to a capsule. It is known by a number of other common names, including Nyasaland, red or white mahogany. Oos-Afrikaanse mahonie is the Afrikaans name and acajou is its name in French.

== Distribution ==
It is widespread, occurring from Guinea Bissau east to Uganda and Tanzania, and south to Angola, Zambia, Zimbabwe and Mozambique. It is fairly widely grown in plantations within its natural area of distribution, but also in South Africa, tropical Asia and tropical America. It is easily confused with other Khaya species like K. grandifoliola, K. senegalensis or K. ivorensis in the north of its natural range.

=== Habitat ===
The East African mahogany grows in medium to low altitude areas in evergreen forests. They require damp lands in order to grow.

== Description ==
Khaya anthotheca trees may grow between 30–60 metres (100–200 ft) tall. They have greyish-brown bark. On mature trees, white scented flowers are borne at the ends of the branches.

The tallest tree in Zimbabwe, the "Big Tree in Chirinda Forest", is a Khaya anthotheca, located in the Chirinda Forest Botanical Reserve. In 1990 it measured 58.5 metres (192 ft); more recently, it has also been reported as 65 m tall, though this measurement is unverified.

== Ecology ==
Chimpanzees in the Budongo Forest, Uganda have been observed eating bark and resin of Khaya anthotheca. As the bark is quite low in nutritional value and the observed chimpanzees were suffering from various ailments including wounds, leukocyte levels suggesting infection, long lasting coughs, or high parasite loads, the presumption is that it is consumed to aid recovery. In laboratory settings it inhibits the growth of the bacteria Enterococcus faecium and Escherichia coli.

== Threats ==
It is often cut down and destroyed in East and West Africa. Planting new trees in these areas to make up for what was destroyed is very rare. Genetic erosion is thought to have occurred as well. Because of this, the species is listed as "vulnerable" on the IUCN Red List. Some of its populations have been offered protection, and some countries placed bans on its export. The foliage is eaten by the larvae of the moth Heteronygmia dissimilis.

== Gallery ==
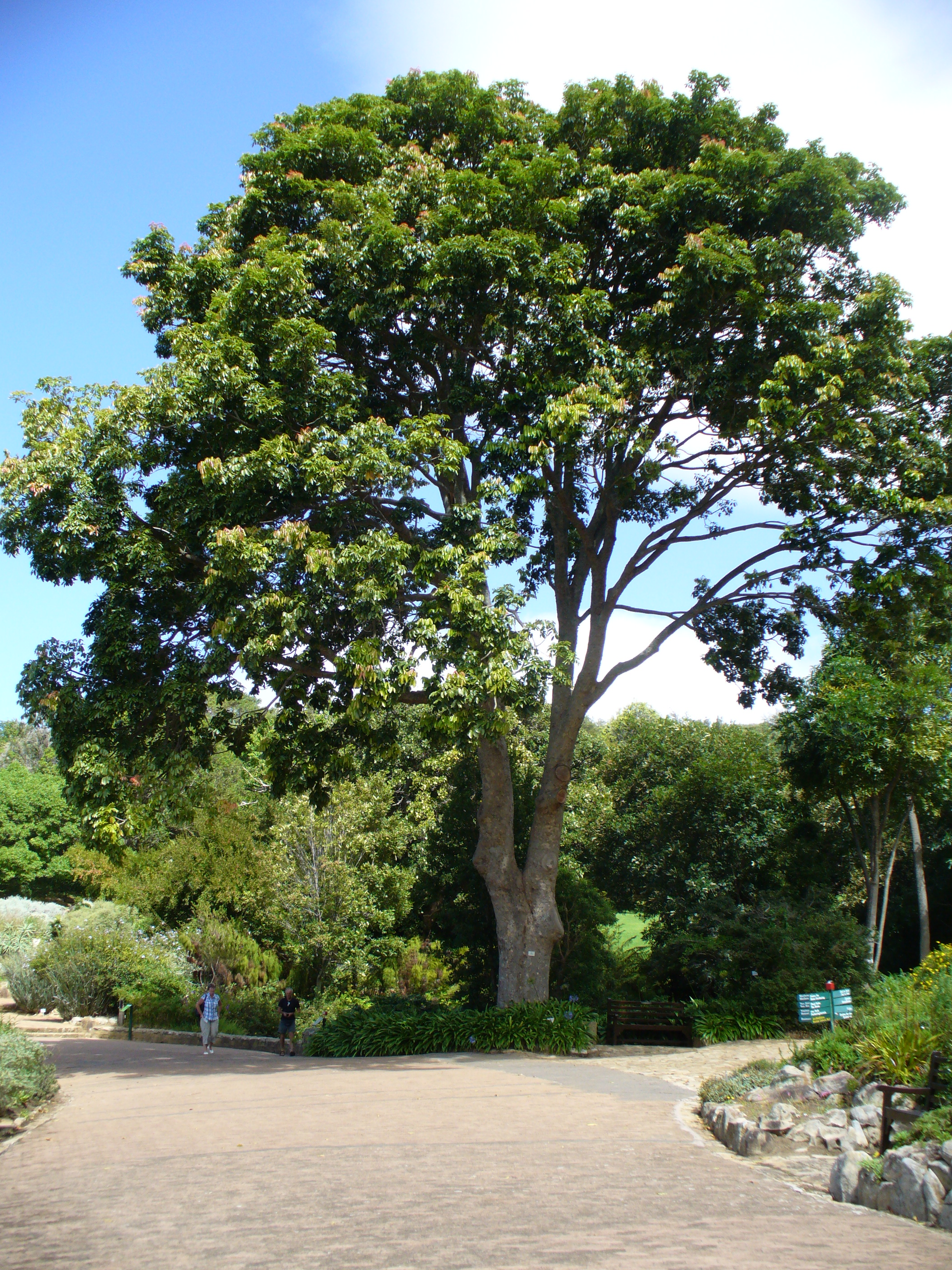
K. anthoteca in Kirstenbosch Botanical Garden

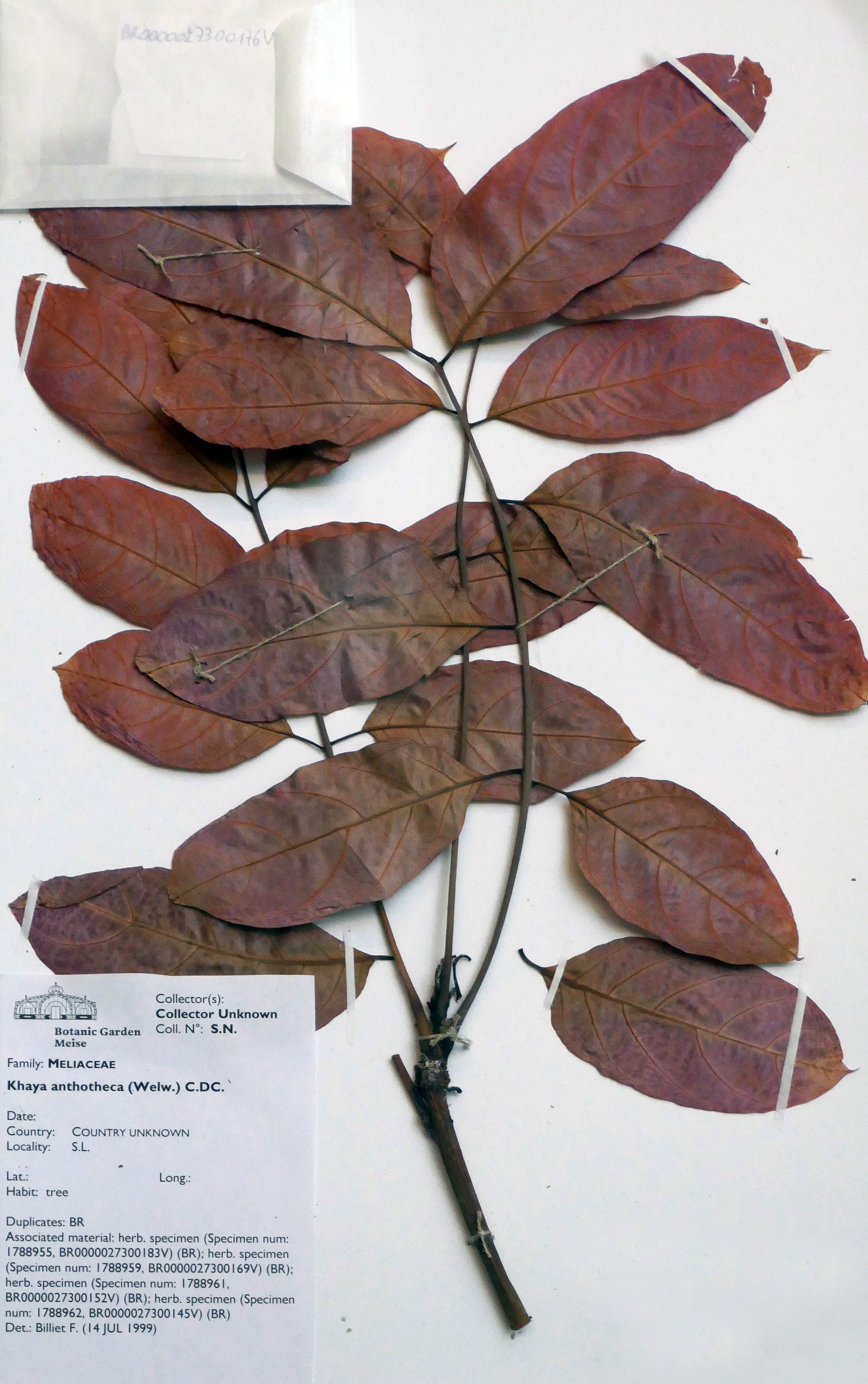
Leaf specimen

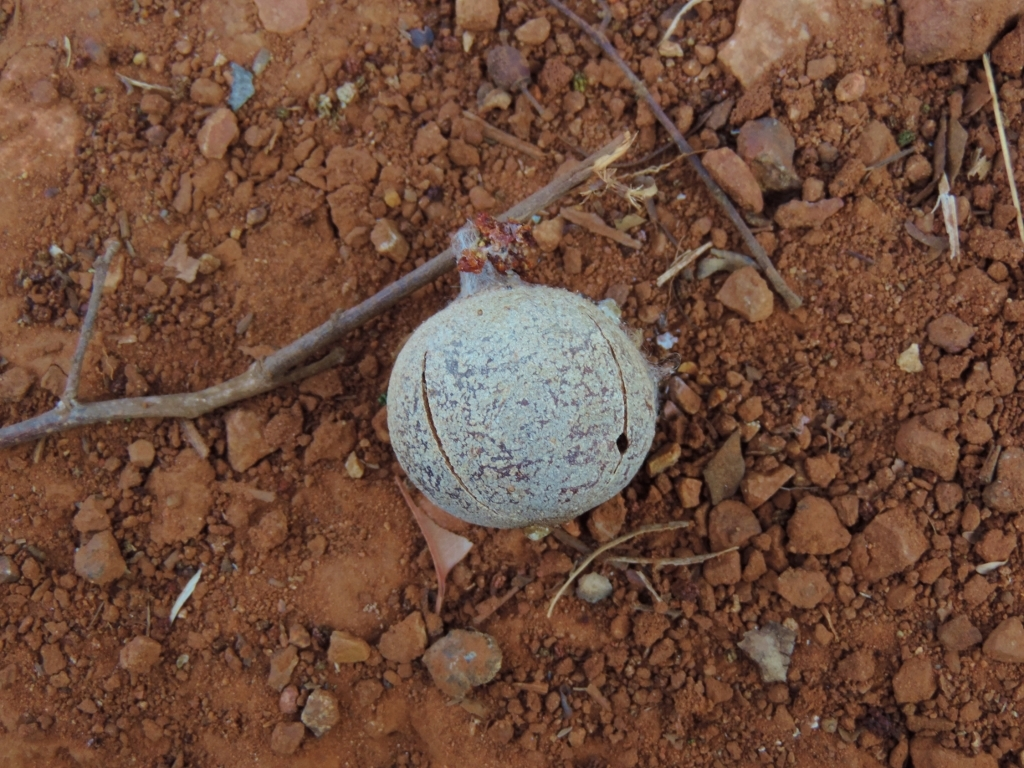
Detail of the seeds

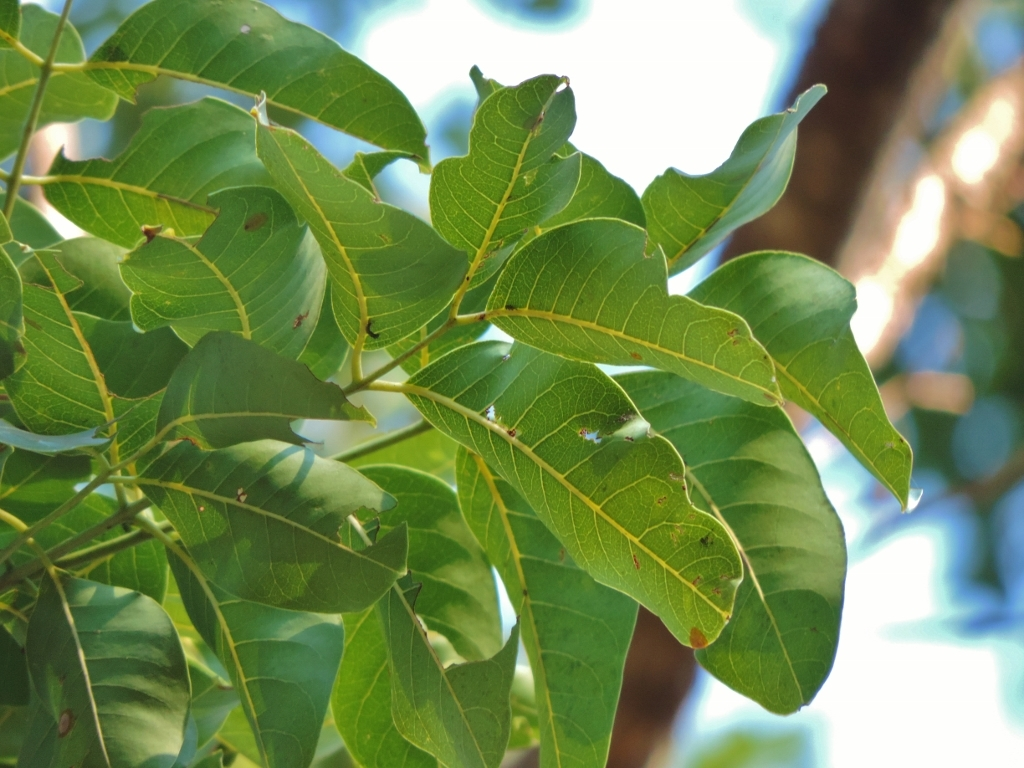
Detail of the leaves

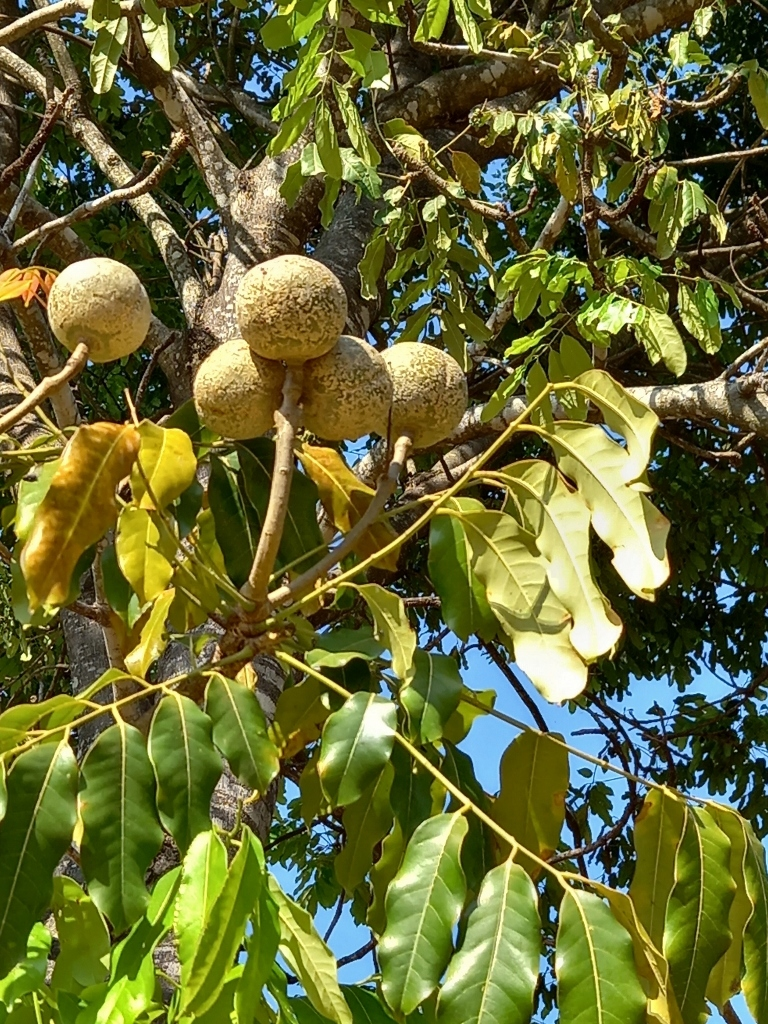
Leaves and seeds on the tree

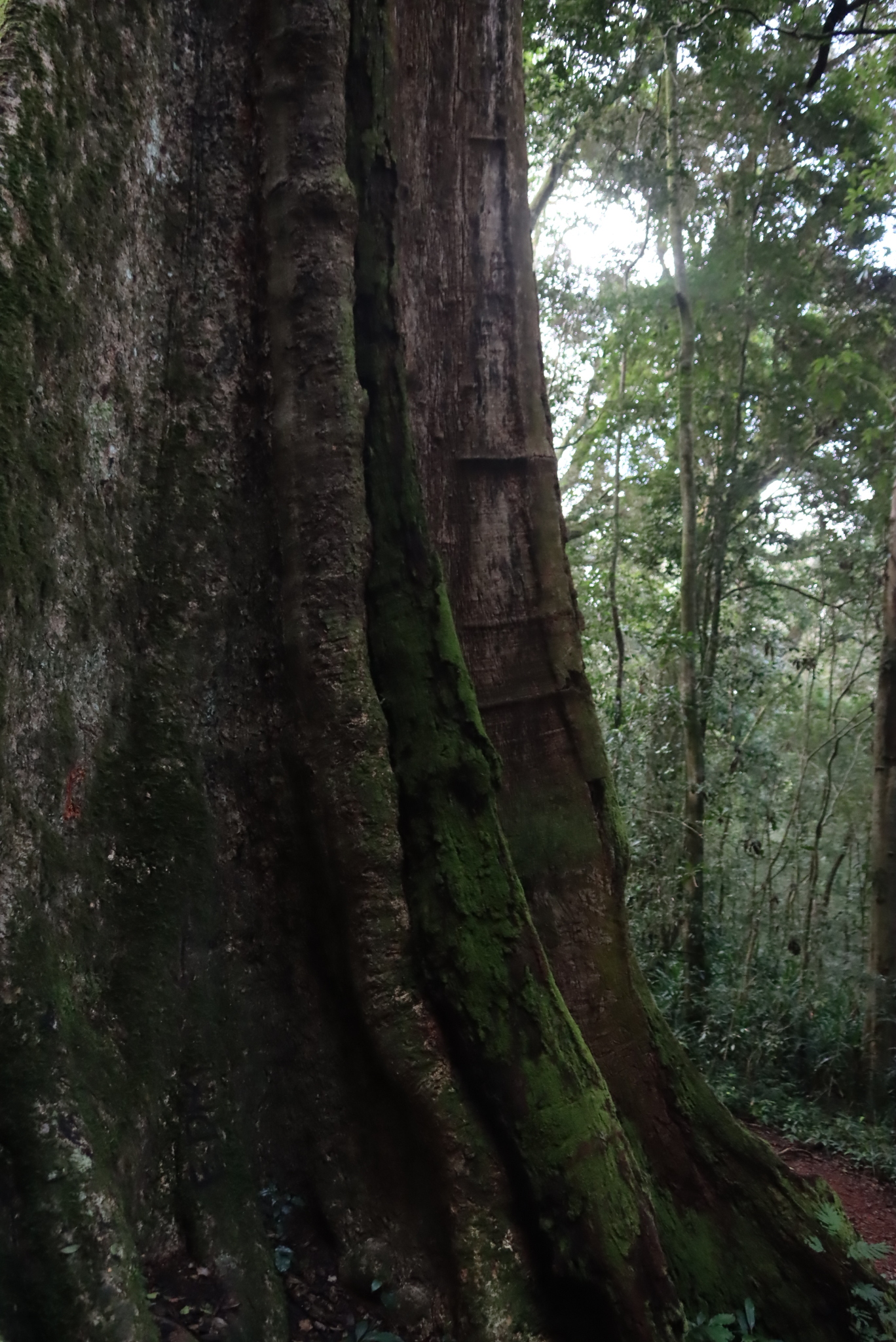
A tree in Zimbabwe
