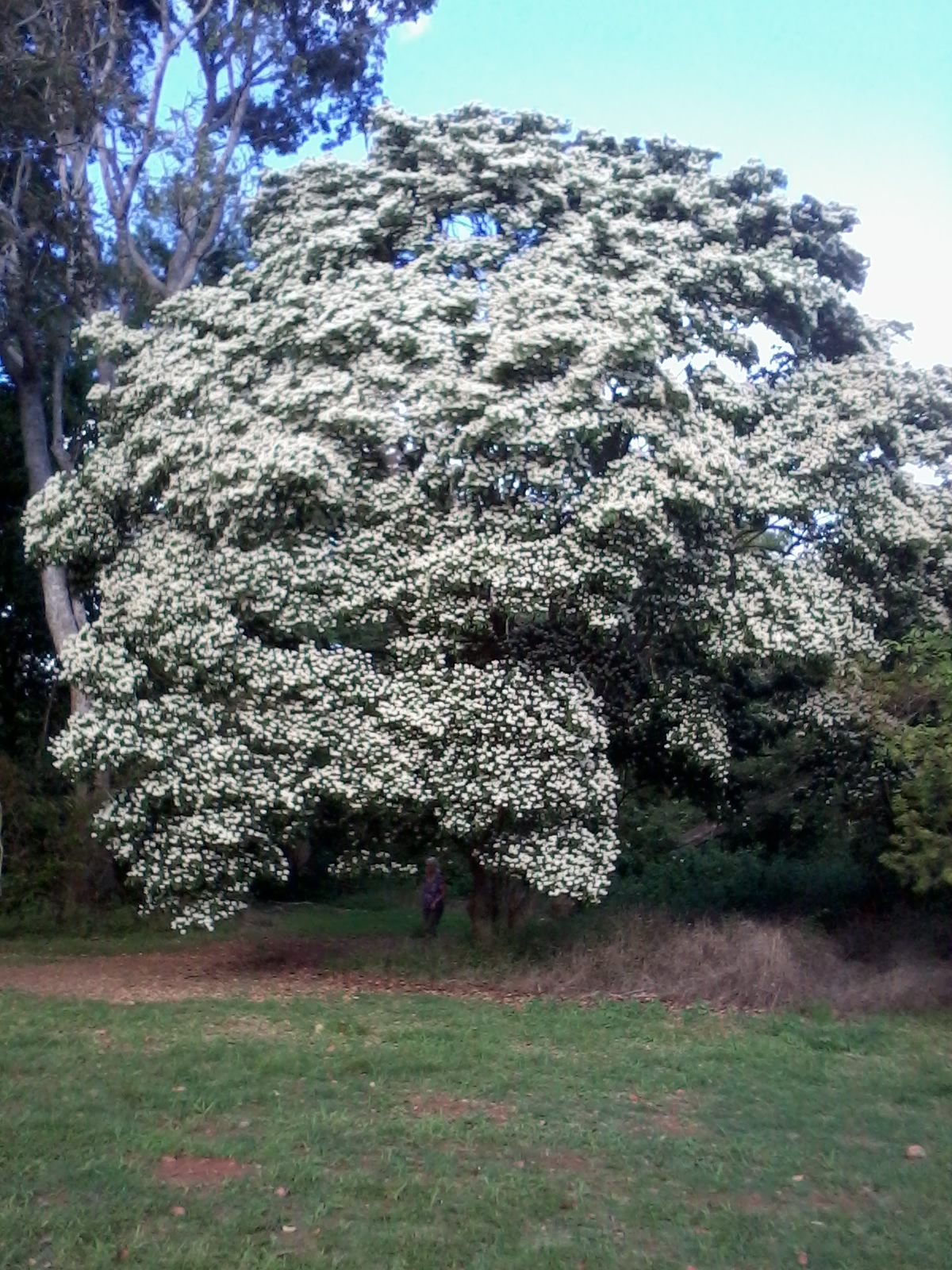

Scientific classification
- Kingdom: Plantae
- Clade: Tracheophytes
- Clade: Angiosperms
- Clade: Eudicots
- Clade: Rosids
- Order: Fabales
- Family: Fabaceae
- Subfamily: Faboideae
- Genus: Craibia
- Species: C. brevicaudata

Binomial name
- Craibia brevicaudata (Vatke) Dunn

Synonyms
- Schefflerodendron gazensis Baker

= Craibia brevicaudata =

Species of legume

Craibia brevicaudata, or the mountain peawood, is a species of medium to large evergreen trees from the family Fabaceae found in Angola, Ethiopia, Kenya, Malawi, Mozambique, Tanzania, Zaire, Zambia, and Zimbabwe. The leaves are imparipinnate and have 5–7 leaflets, which are dark green coloured, are leathery and almost hairless. The plants petiole is swelled. The flowers are compactly racemed, and are white-greenish at the center. The pods are flat, and creamy-gray, and carry reddish-brown seeds.
