= Big Tree in Chirinda Forest =

Tall tree in Chirinda Forest, Zimbabwe

Coordinates: 20°26′29″S 32°42′15″E

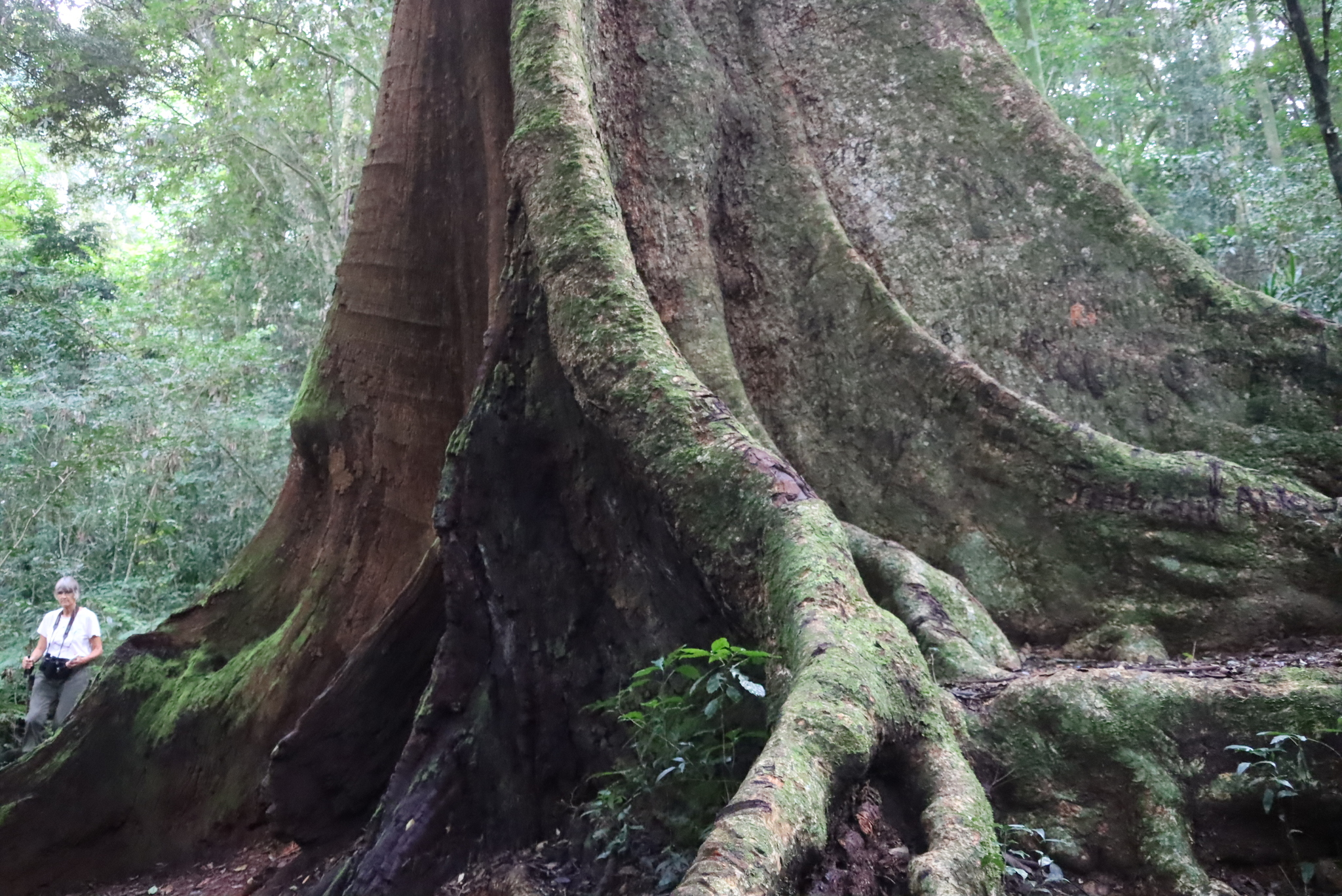
- Interactive map of Big Tree in Chirinda Forest
- Location: Zimbabwe
- Height: 65 m (213 ft)
- Diameter: 4.5 m (15 ft)

Big Tree (or The Big Tree in Chirinda Forest) is the tallest indigenous tree in Zimbabwe, and a declared National Monument. The tree is around 65 metres tall and 4.5 metres wide. Its age is approximately 1,000 years. The tree is located in the centre of Chirinda Forest (formerly known as Selinda) in southeast Zimbabwe at the southernmost part of the country's Eastern Highlands. Big Tree is a Khaya anthotheca or Nyasa redwood tree (previously referred to as Khaya nyasica). In December 1986, it reached 65 metres tall and 5.25 metres wide. The trunk is heavily buttressed at the base, which complicates measurement.

== Conservation ==
The Big Tree is protected within the Chirinda Forest Botanical Reserve, administered by Zimbabwe Parks and Wildlife Estate. It sustained damage from people carving their initials into it. The tree is suffering from some dieback, indicated by its declining height and the loss of its topmost branches, but as of April 2025 it appears in overall good health. Whether the decline is due to human-related damage such as climate change or a natural process is unknown.

== Other Khaya trees ==
Specimens of Khaya anthotheca planted in urban areas, particularly in Harare and Mutare, have achieved massive size and height and often threaten buildings. They are not protected on private land in Zimbabwe.

Large specimens are notable in older suburbs such as Avondale and Greendale. In Mutare, a site near the Botanical Gardens features a row of 26 giant trees in various states of health. In many places, the trees are home to hundreds of epiphytic orchids and are a favourite vantage perch for large birds, including the augur buzzard, bat hawks, pied crows, and silvery-cheeked hornbills.

== See also ==
- List of individual trees
