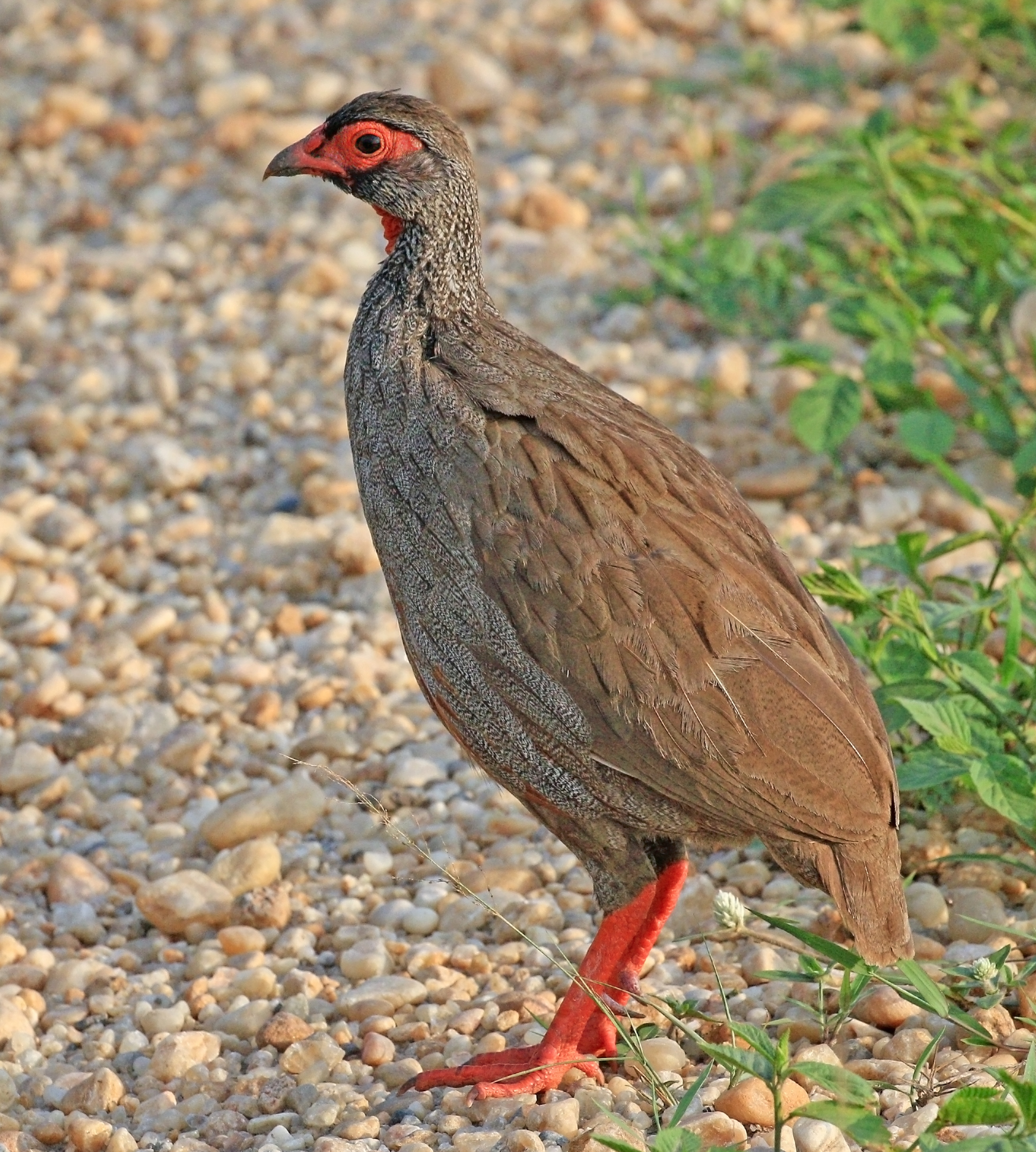

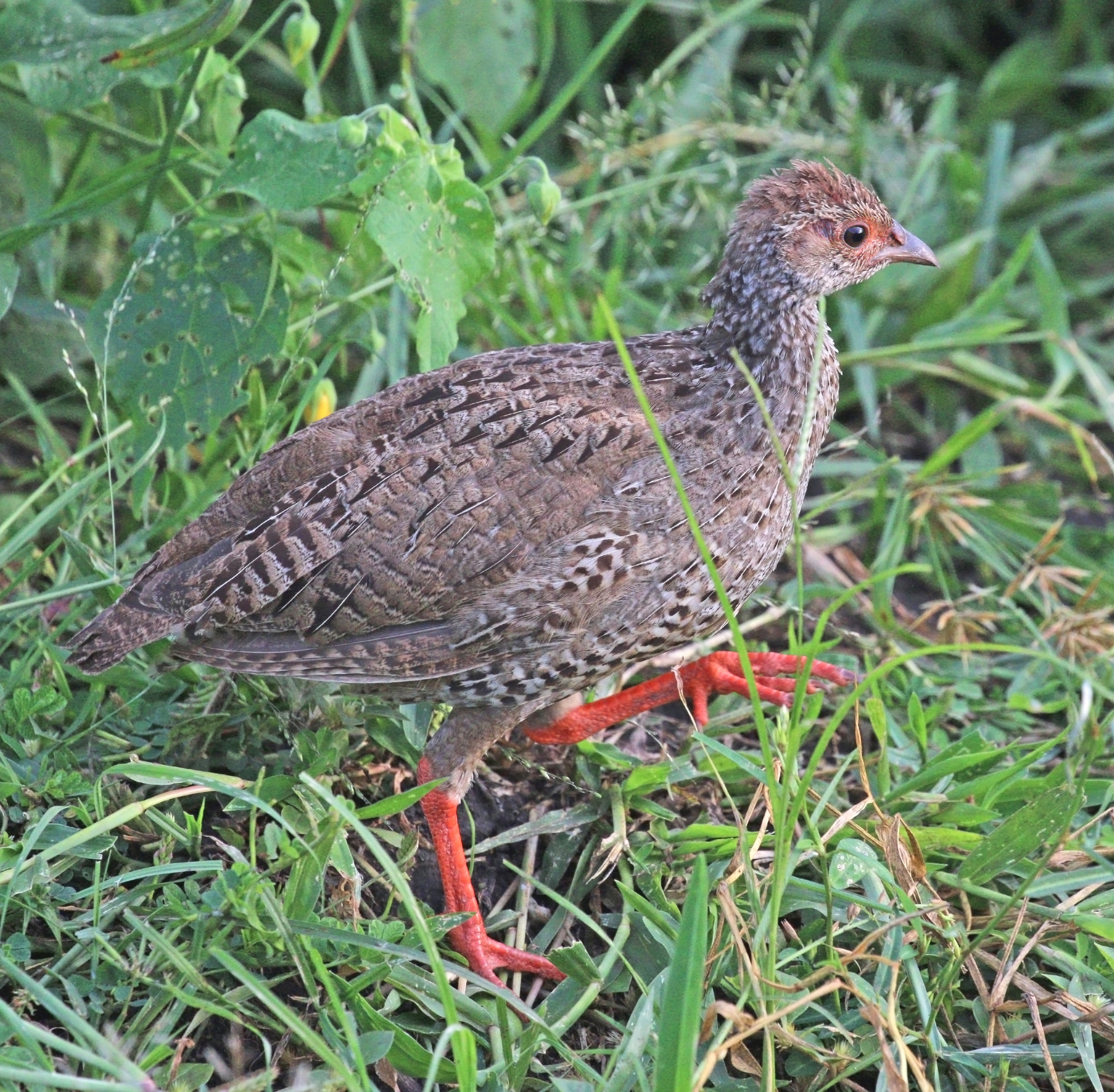
- Adult and immature P. a. cranchii in Queen Elizabeth NP

Conservation status
- Least Concern (IUCN 3.1)

Scientific classification
- Kingdom: Animalia
- Phylum: Chordata
- Class: Aves
- Order: Galliformes
- Family: Phasianidae
- Genus: Pternistis
- Species: P. afer

Binomial name
- Pternistis afer (Müller, PLS, 1776)
- geographic distribution

Synonyms
- Francolinus afer; Tetrao afer

= Red-necked spurfowl =

Species of bird

The red-necked spurfowl or red-necked francolin (Pternistis afer), is a gamebird in the pheasant family Phasianidae that is a resident species in southern Africa.

== Taxonomy ==
The red-necked spurfowl was described in 1776 by the German zoologist Philipp Ludwig Statius Müller and given the binomial name Tetrao afer. The type locality was later designated as Benguela in western Angola. The specific epithet afer is the Latin word for "African". The species is now placed in the genus Pternistis that was introduced by the German naturalist Johann Georg Wagler in 1832. A molecular phylogenetic study published in 2019 found that the red-necked spurfowl is sister to the grey-breasted spurfowl.

Although many subspecies have been described only four are now recognised:

- P. a. cranchii (Leach, 1818) — north Gabon and south Congo Republic though south, east Democratic Republic of the Congo to central Angola and west Zambia to central Tanzania, west Kenya and Uganda (Note: Mandiwana-Neudani et al (2019) treat P. a. cranchii as a separate species, Cranch's spurfowl.)
- P. a. afer (Müller, PLS, 1776) — west Angola, northwest Namibia
- P. a. castaneiventer Gunning & Roberts, 1911 — south and east South Africa
- P. a. humboldtii (Peters, W, 1854) — southeast Kenya and north and east Tanzania to Mozambique, northeast Zambia and east Zimbabwe
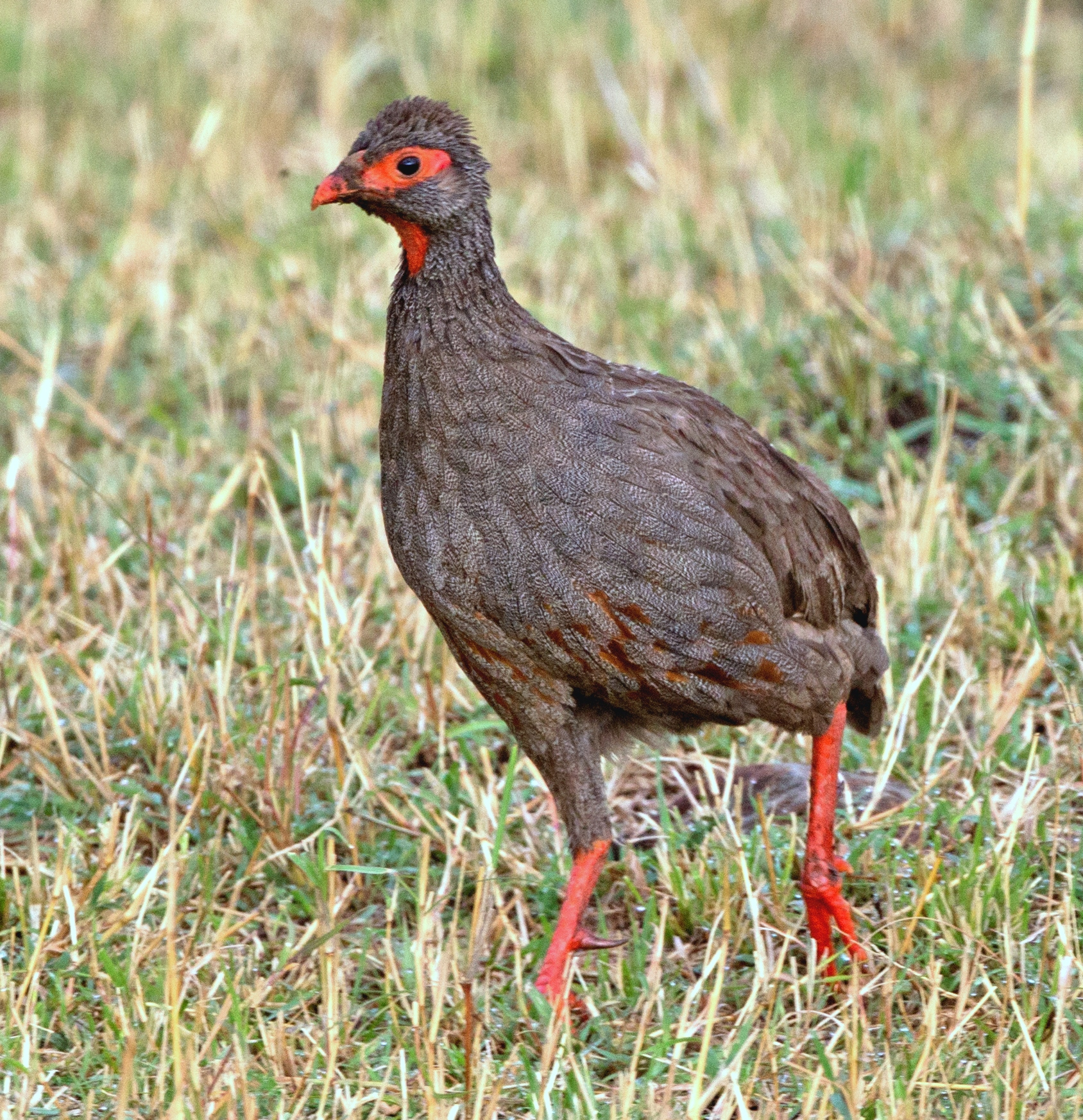
P. a. cranchii
(Leach, 1818)
in western Kenya

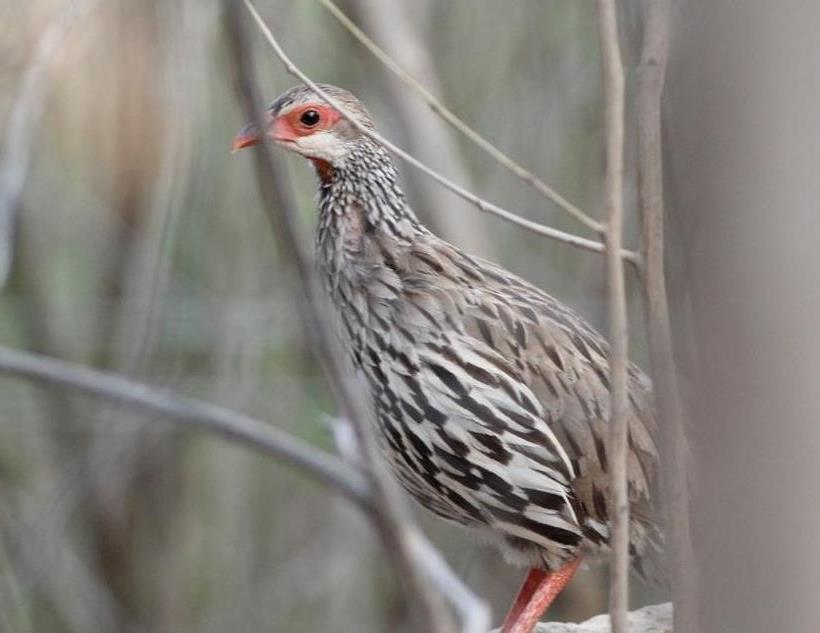
P. a. afer
(Statius Müller, 1776)
in northern Namibia

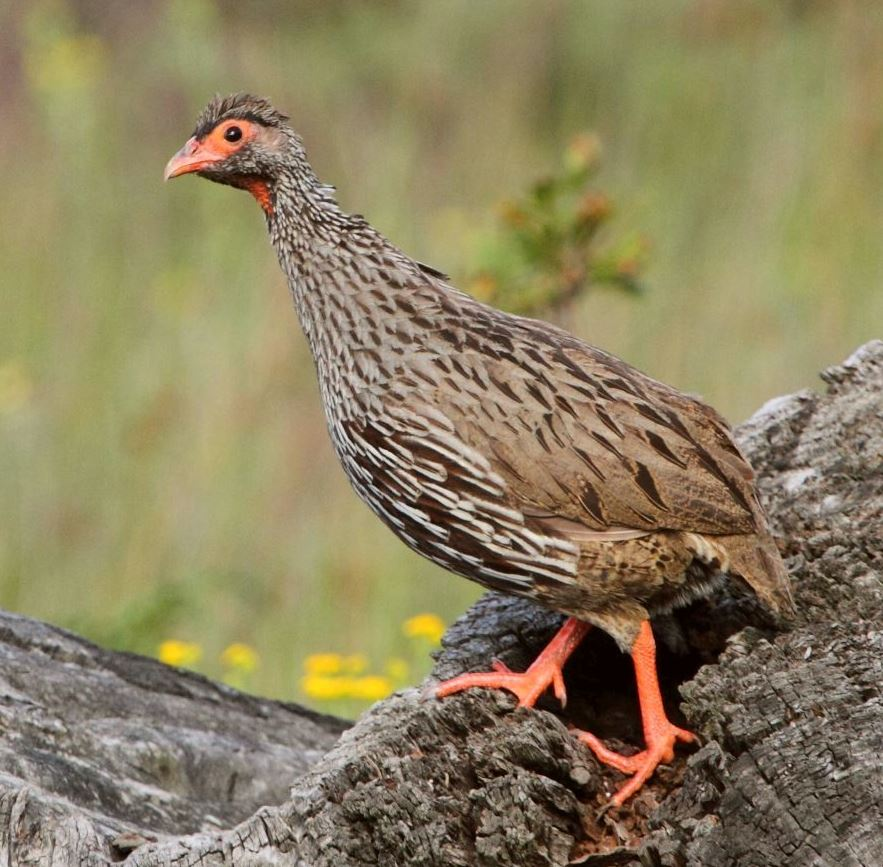
P. a. castaneiventer
Gunning & Roberts, 1911
in South Africa

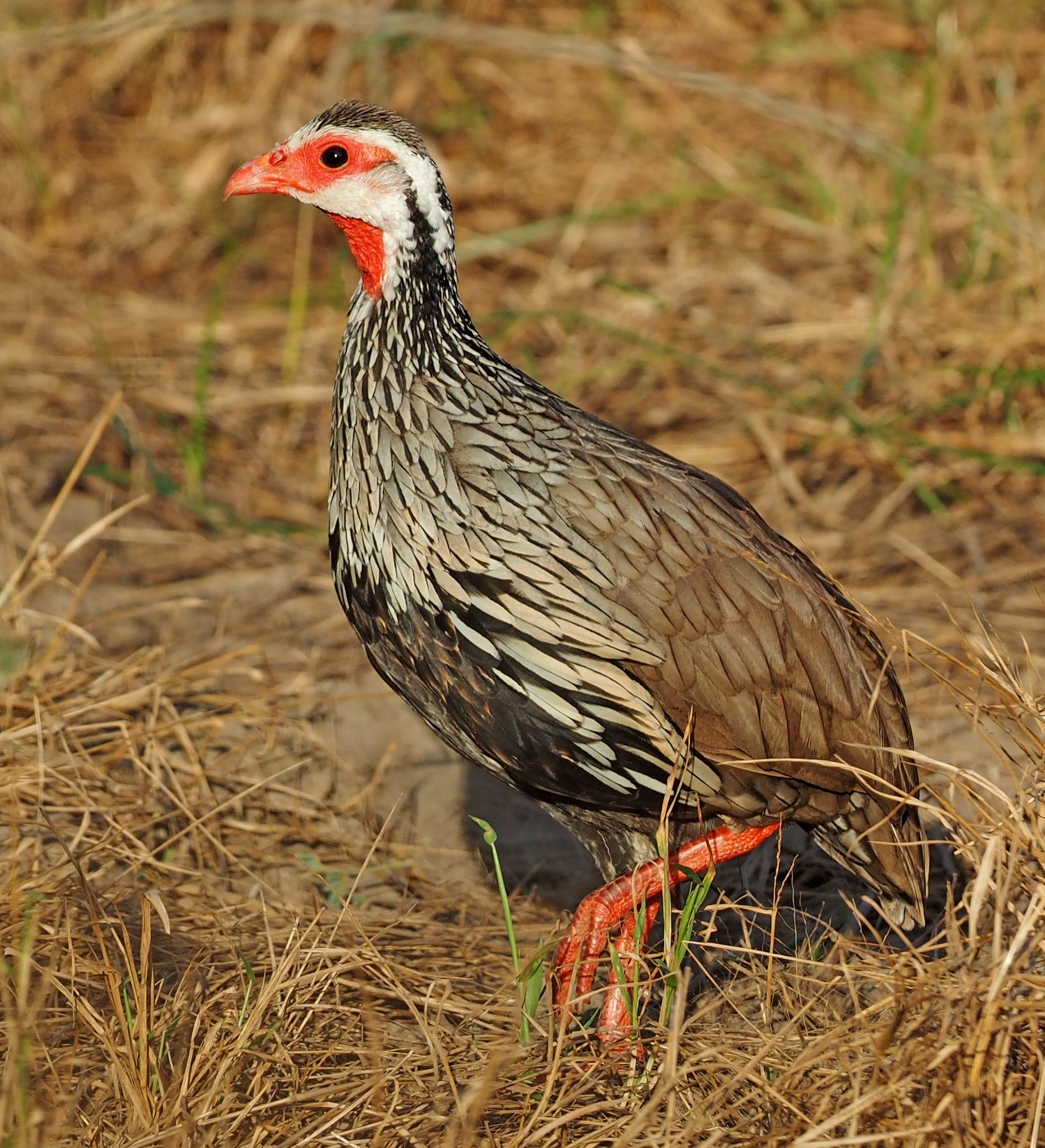
P. a. humboldtii
(Peters, W, 1854)
in Mozambique

== Description ==
The red-necked spurfowl is 25–38 cm (9.8–15.0 in) in length, with significant size differences between the subspecies. It is a generally dark spurfowl, brown above and black-streaked grey or white underparts. The bill, bare facial skin, neck and legs are bright red.

== Distribution ==
The red-necked spurfowl occurs across the central region of Africa below the Congo Basin. It is found in Angola, southern Gabon and the southern Democratic Republic of the Congo. In the east it occurs in Uganda, Rwanda and Burundi to southern Kenya and Tanzania. Its distribution continues down the eastern side of Southern Africa, being absent from most parts of Namibia, Botswana and the western parts of South Africa.

== Behaviour and ecology ==
The red-necked spurfowl is a wary species, keeping to deep cover, although it sometimes feeds in open scrub or cultivation if disturbance is limited and there are thickets nearby. The nest is a bare scrape, and three to nine eggs are laid.

== Status ==
Widespread and common throughout its large range, the red-necked spurfowl is evaluated as Least Concern on the IUCN Red List of Threatened Species.
