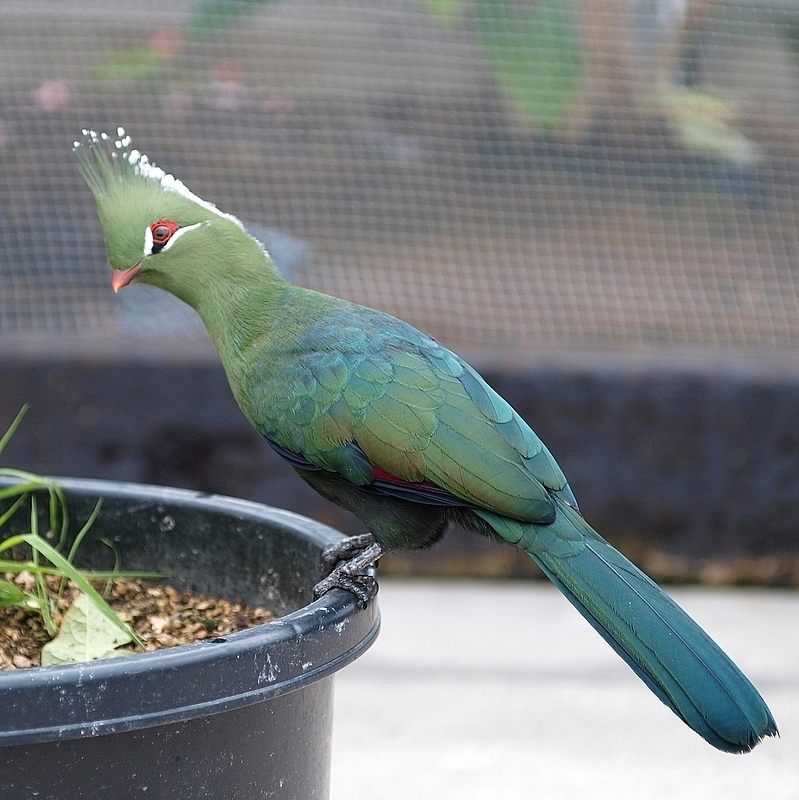

Conservation status
- Least Concern (IUCN 3.1)

Scientific classification
- Kingdom: Animalia
- Phylum: Chordata
- Class: Aves
- Order: Musophagiformes
- Family: Musophagidae
- Genus: Tauraco
- Species: T. livingstonii

Binomial name
- Tauraco livingstonii Gray, GR, 1864
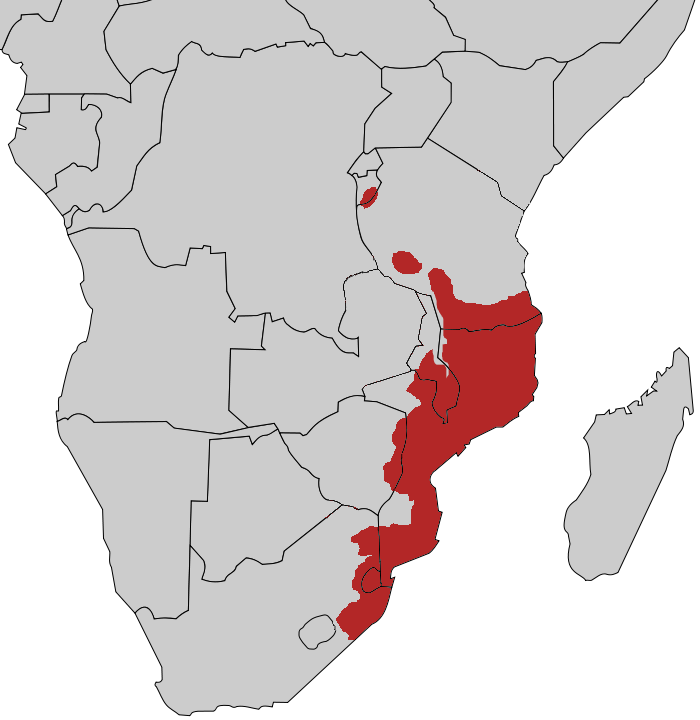
- resident range

= Livingstone's turaco =

Species of bird

Livingstone's turaco (Tauraco livingstonii) is a species of bird in the family Musophagidae, which was named for Charles Livingstone, the brother of David Livingstone.

It is distributed through the subtropical lowlands of southeastern Africa. It has an isolated population in Burundi, and is besides found from southern Tanzania to eastern and southern Malawi, eastern Zimbabwe, widely in Mozambique and along the subtropical coast of South Africa.

By appearances and behaviour, it has much in common with the Knysna turaco of South Africa, and Schalow's turaco which replaces it on the plateau regions to the west of its range.

== Gallery ==
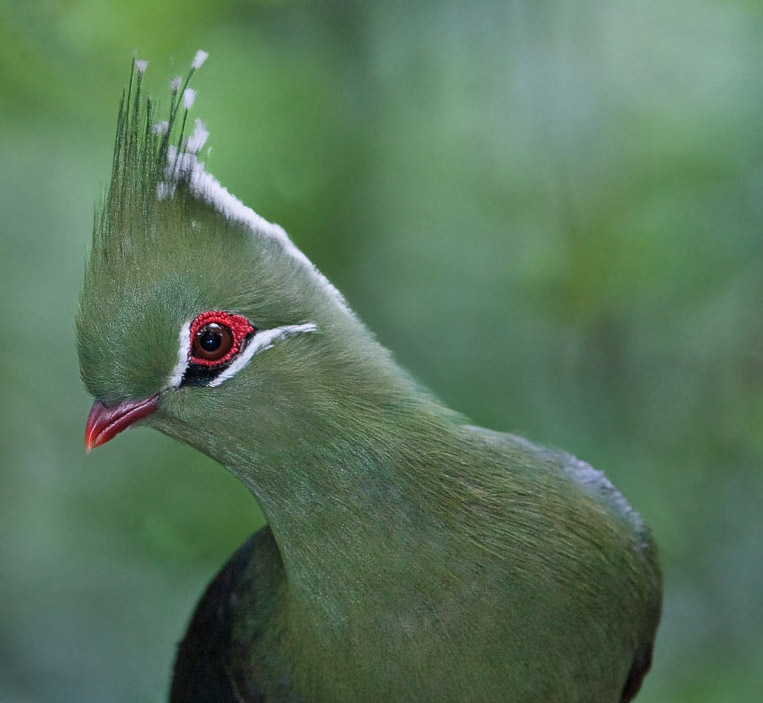
In captivity

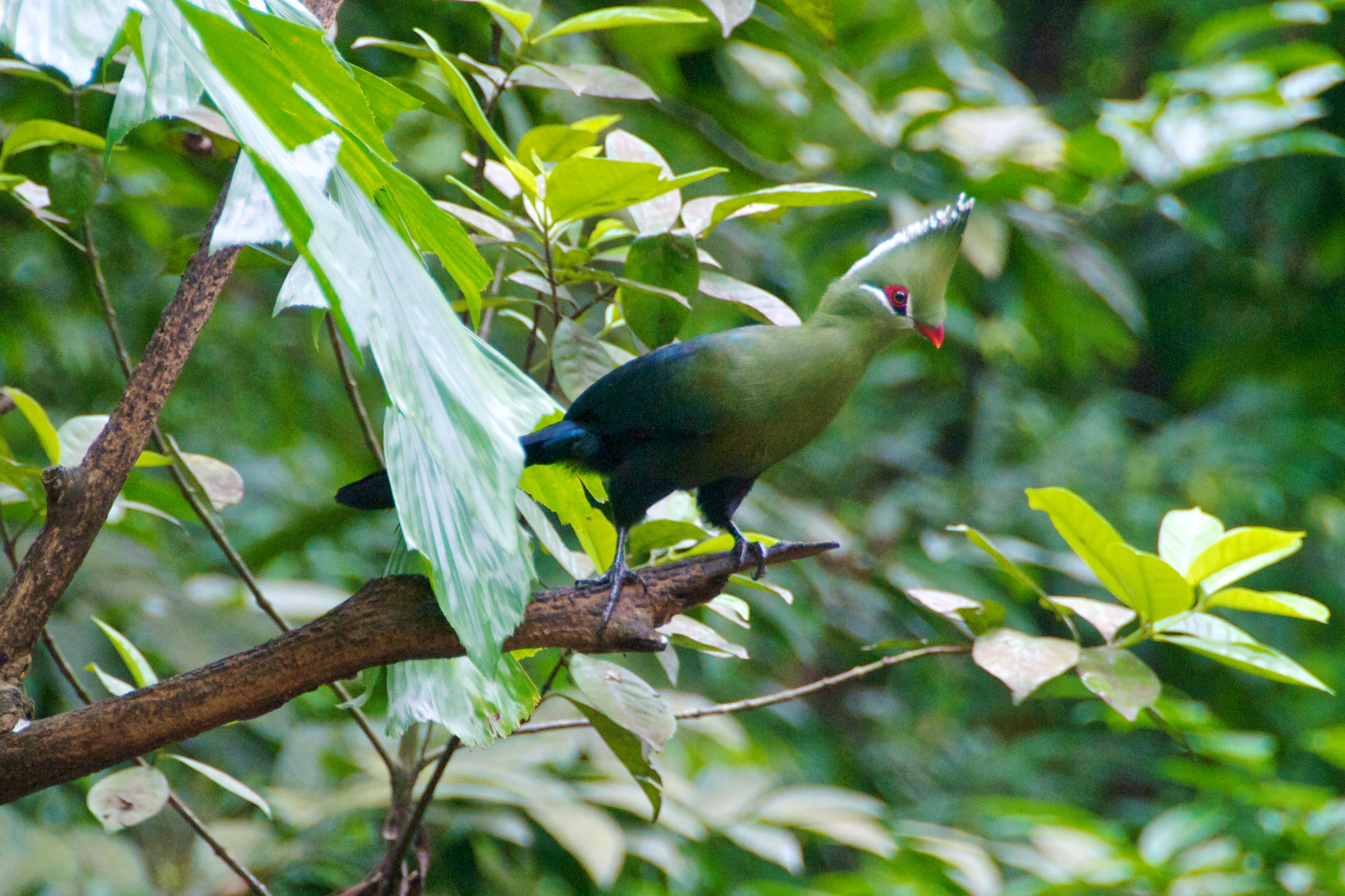
In captivity

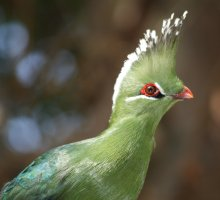
At San Diego Wild Animal Park, USA
