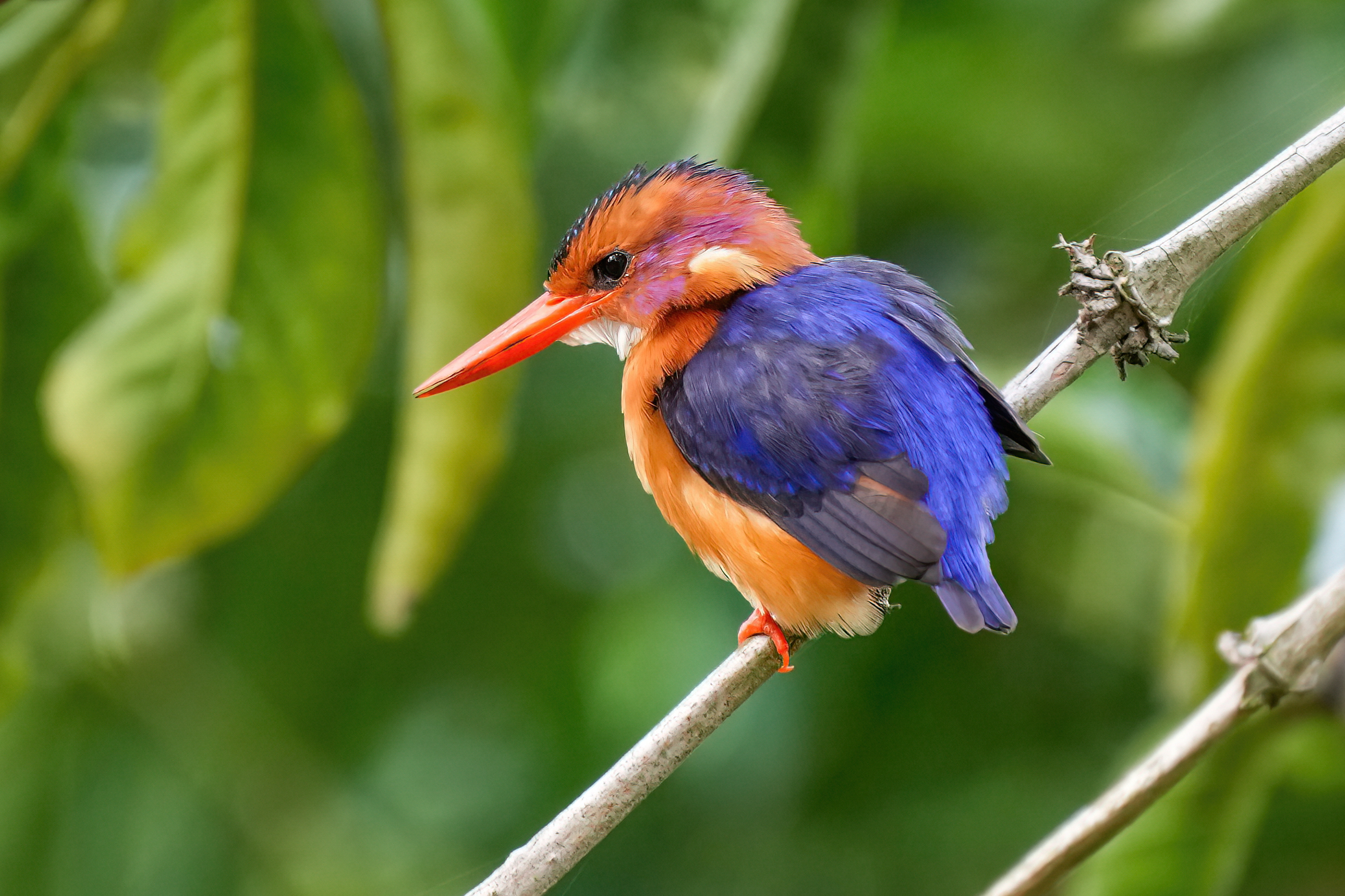

Conservation status
- Least Concern (IUCN 3.1)

Scientific classification
- Kingdom: Animalia
- Phylum: Chordata
- Class: Aves
- Order: Coraciiformes
- Family: Alcedinidae
- Subfamily: Alcedininae
- Genus: Ispidina
- Species: I. picta

Binomial name
- Ispidina picta (Boddaert, 1783)

Subspecies
- (See text)
- species range (IUCN) Year round resident Summer breeding visitor

Synonyms
- Ceyx pictus

= African pygmy kingfisher =

Species of bird

The African pygmy kingfisher (Ispidina picta) is a small insectivorous kingfisher found in the Afrotropics, mostly in woodland habitats.

== Taxonomy ==
The African pygmy kingfisher was described by the French polymath Georges-Louis Leclerc, Comte de Buffon in 1780 in his Histoire Naturelle des Oiseaux. The bird was also illustrated in a hand-coloured plate engraved by François-Nicolas Martinet in the Planches Enluminées D'Histoire Naturelle which was produced under the supervision of Edme-Louis Daubenton to accompany Buffon's text. Neither the plate caption nor Buffon's description included a scientific name but in 1783 the Dutch naturalist Pieter Boddaert coined the binomial name Todier de Juida in his catalogue of the Planches Enluminées. The type locality is Saint Louis, Senegal. The African pygmy kingfisher is now placed in the genus Ispidina that was introduced by the German naturalist Johann Jakob Kaup in 1848.

The specific epithet picta is from the Latin pictus meaning "painted". Some texts refer to this species as Ceyx pictus.

There are three subspecies:

- I. p. picta (Boddaert, 1783) — Senegal and Gambia to Ethiopia, and south to Uganda
- I. p. ferrugina Clancey, 1984 — Guinea-Bissau to western Uganda, and south to Angola, Zambia, and northern Tanzania
- I. p. natalensis (Smith, A, 1832) — southern Angola to central Tanzania south to northern and eastern South Africa

== Description ==
The African pygmy kingfisher is 12 cm (4.7 in) in length. The sexes are alike. It is a very small kingfisher with rufous underparts and a blue back extending down to the tail. The dark blue crown of the adult separates it from the African dwarf kingfisher. The smaller size and violet wash on the ear coverts distinguish it from the similar malachite kingfisher.

The natalensis subspecies occurring in the south of the range has paler underparts and a blue spot above the white ear patch. Juveniles have less extensive violet on their ear coverts and a black rather than orange bill. The call is a high-pitched insect-like "tsip-tsip" given in flight.

== Distribution and habitat ==
The African pygmy kingfisher is distributed widely in Africa south of the Sahara, where it is a common resident and intra-African migrant. It is absent from much of the horn of Africa, and also the drier western regions of Southern Africa. It is found in woodland, savanna and coastal forest, and it is not bound to water. It is usually found either singly or in pairs and is secretive and unobtrusive.

== Behaviour ==
=== Breeding ===
African pygmy kingfishers nest in burrows that are dug by both sexes in sandy soil banks or into a ground termite nest. The burrows are between 30 and 60 cm (12 and 24 in) in length. The clutch is four to six white eggs. Both parents care for the young. They can have several broods in a year.

=== Feeding ===
The African pygmy kingfisher's diet consists of insects like grasshoppers, praying mantis, worms, crickets, dragonflies, cockroaches, and moths. They are also known to take spiders which make up quite a large part of their diet. They also take geckos and lizards that are easily their length and small frogs and even occasionally small crabs. Prey are hunted from low perches and once caught are either crushed in the beak or smashed against the perch.

=== Migration ===
The southern subspecies overwinters as far north as 2°N (DRC, Uganda, South Sudan, and Kenya). They are thought to migrate mainly at night; most leave their breeding grounds in March and April, and return in September or October.

== Gallery ==
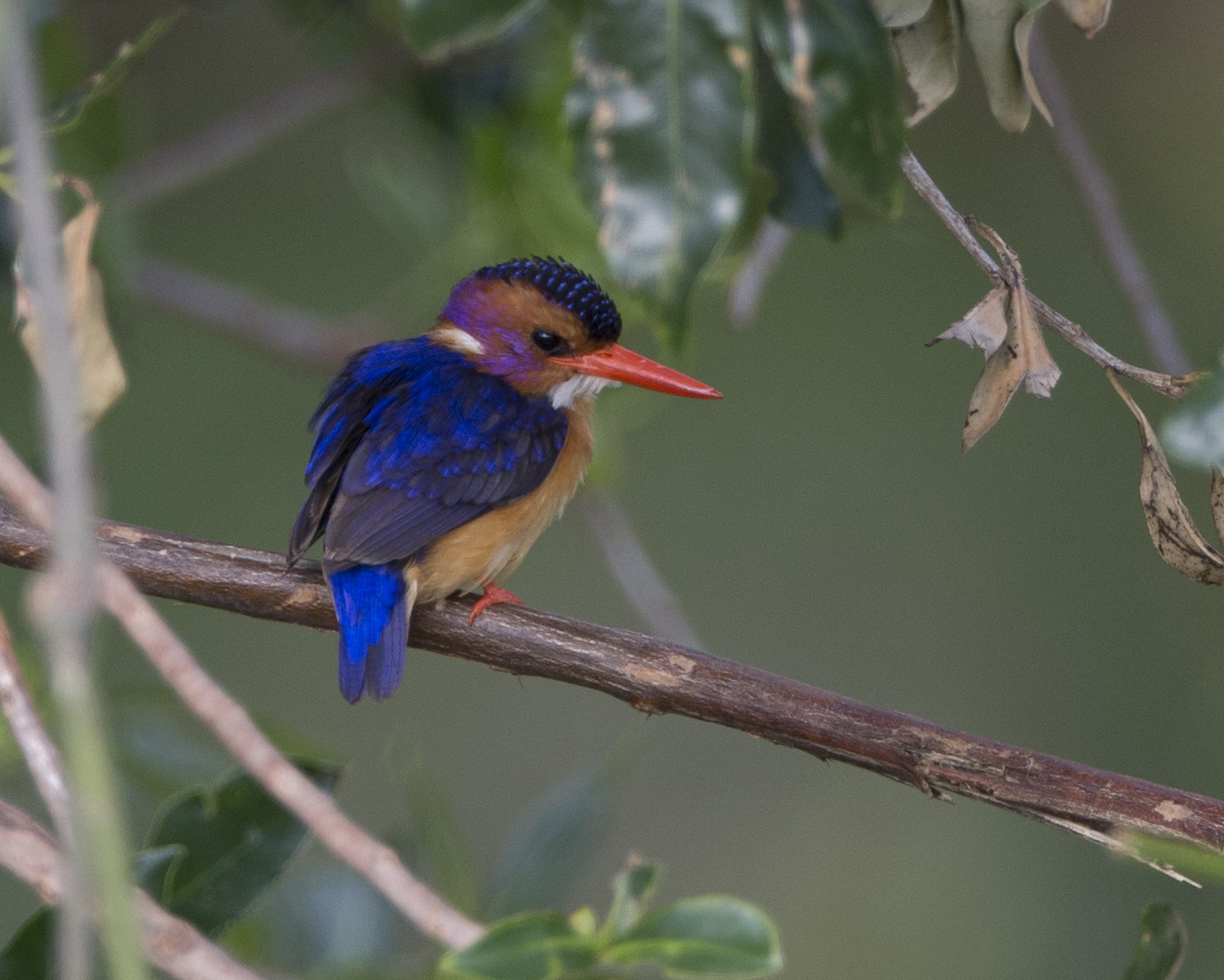
Kenya

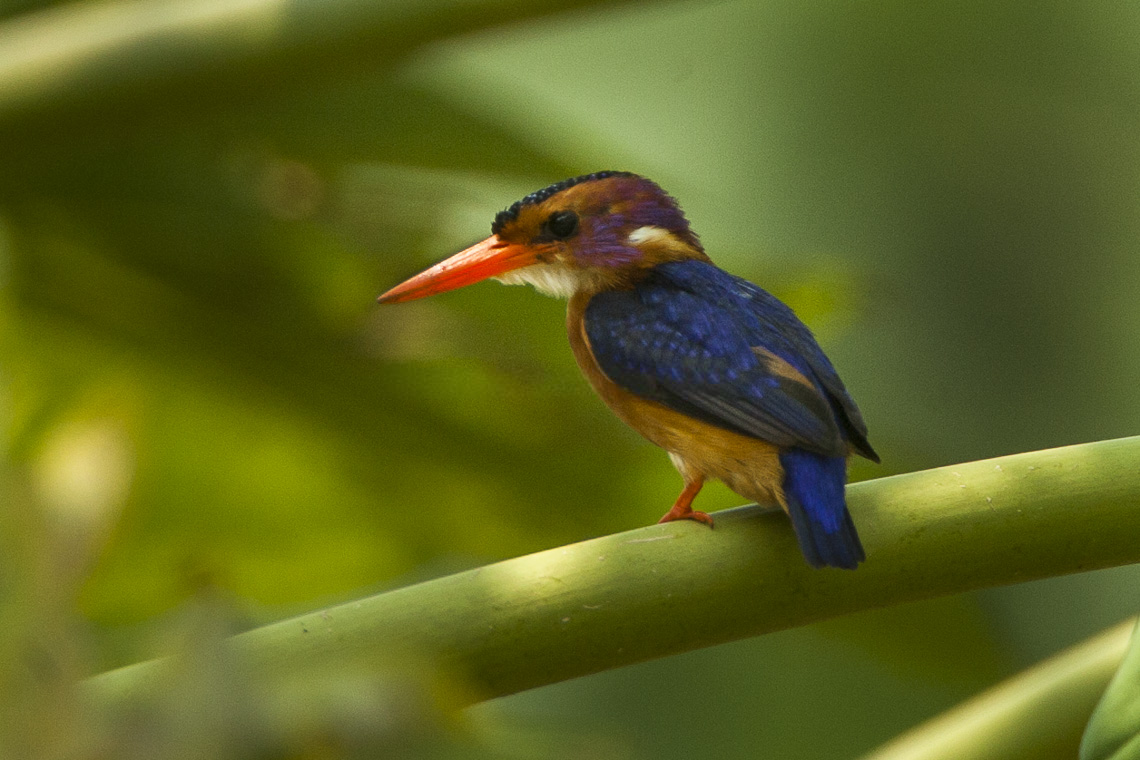
Uganda

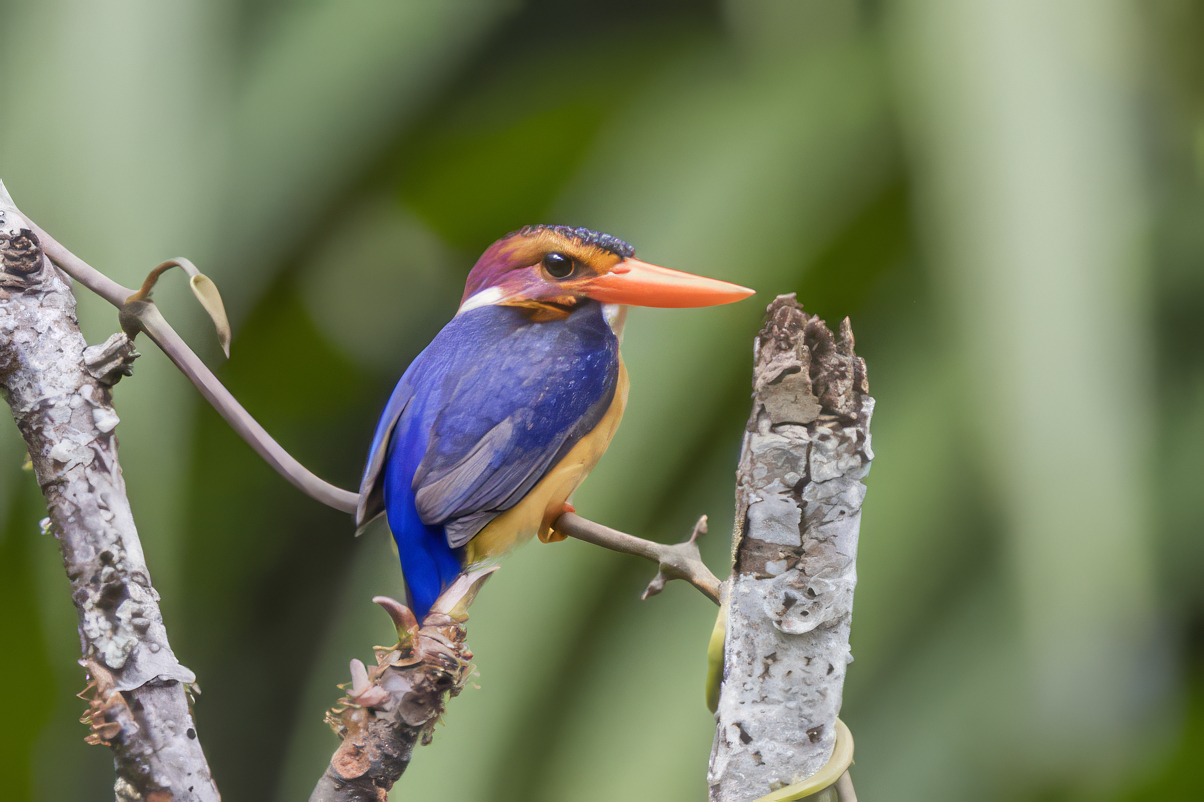
I. p. ferrugina, Ghana
