= List of Myrtales of South Africa =

Flowering plants in the order Myrtales recorded from South Africa

Myrtales is an order of flowering plants placed within the eurosids by the APG III system of classification for angiosperms. This finding is corroborated by the placement of the Myrtales in the Malvid clade by the One Thousand Plant Transcriptomes Initiative. The anthophytes are a grouping of plant taxa bearing flower-like reproductive structures. They were formerly thought to be a clade comprising plants bearing flower-like structures. The group contained the angiosperms – the extant flowering plants, such as roses and grasses – as well as the Gnetales and the extinct Bennettitales.

23,420 species of vascular plant have been recorded in South Africa, making it the sixth most species-rich country in the world and the most species-rich country on the African continent. Of these, 153 species are considered to be threatened. Nine biomes have been described in South Africa: Fynbos, Succulent Karoo, desert, Nama Karoo, grassland, savanna, Albany thickets, the Indian Ocean coastal belt, and forests.

The 2018 South African National Biodiversity Institute's National Biodiversity Assessment plant checklist lists 35,130 taxa in the phyla Anthocerotophyta (hornworts (6)), Anthophyta (flowering plants (33534)), Bryophyta (mosses (685)), Cycadophyta (cycads (42)), Lycopodiophyta (Lycophytes(45)), Marchantiophyta (liverworts (376)), Pinophyta (conifers (33)), and Pteridophyta (cryptogams (408)).

Ten families are represented in the literature. Listed taxa include species, subspecies, varieties, and forms as recorded, some of which have subsequently been allocated to other taxa as synonyms, in which cases the accepted taxon is appended to the listing. Multiple entries under alternative names reflect taxonomic revision over time.

== Combretaceae ==
Family: Combretaceae,

=== Combretum ===
Genus Combretum:

- Combretum apiculatum Sond. indigenous
  - Combretum apiculatum Sond. subsp. apiculatum, indigenous
- Combretum bracteosum (Hochst.) Engl. & Diels, endemic
- Combretum afrum (Eckl. & Zeyh.) Kuntze, endemic
- Combretum celastroides Welw. ex M.A.Lawson subsp. orientale Exell, accepted as Combretum celastroides Welw. ex M.A.Lawson subsp. celastroides, indigenous
- Combretum collinum Fresen. indigenous
  - Combretum collinum Fresen. subsp. gazense (Swynn. & Baker f.) Okafor, indigenous
  - Combretum collinum Fresen. subsp. suluense (Engl. & Diels) Okafor, indigenous
  - Combretum collinum Fresen. subsp. taborense (Engl.) Okafor, indigenous
- Combretum edwardsii Exell, endemic
- Combretum erythrophyllum (Burch.) Sond. indigenous
- Combretum hereroense Schinz, indigenous
  - Combretum hereroense Schinz subsp. hereroense, indigenous
- Combretum imberbe Wawra, indigenous
- Combretum kraussii Hochst. indigenous
- Combretum microphyllum Klotzsch, indigenous
- Combretum mkuzense J.D.Carr & Retief, endemic
- Combretum moggii Exell, endemic
- Combretum molle R.Br. ex G.Don, indigenous
- Combretum mossambicense (Klotzsch) Engl. indigenous
- Combretum nelsonii Dummer, endemic
- Combretum padoides Engl. & Diels, indigenous
- Combretum petrophilum Retief, endemic
- Combretum stylesii O.Maurin, Jordaan & A.E.van Wyk, indigenous
- Combretum tenuipes Engl. & Diels, endemic
- Combretum vendae A.E.van Wyk, endemic
  - Combretum vendae A.E.van Wyk var. glabratum N.Hahn, endemic
  - Combretum vendae A.E.van Wyk var. vendae, endemic
- Combretum woodii Dummer, indigenous
- Combretum zeyheri Sond. indigenous

=== Lumnitzera ===
Genus Lumnitzera:

- Lumnitzera racemosa Willd. indigenous
  - Lumnitzera racemosa Willd. var. racemosa, indigenous

=== Pteleopsis ===
Genus Pteleopsis:

- Pteleopsis myrtifolia (M.A.Lawson) Engl. & Diels, indigenous

=== Quisqualis ===
Genus Quisqualis:

- Quisqualis parviflora Gerrard ex Sond. endemic

=== Terminalia ===
Genus Terminalia:

- Terminalia brachystemma Welw. ex Hiern, indigenous
  - Terminalia brachystemma Welw. ex Hiern subsp. brachystemma, indigenous
- Terminalia phanerophlebia Engl. & Diels, indigenous
- Terminalia prunioides M.A.Lawson, indigenous
- Terminalia sericea Burch. ex DC. indigenous

== Heteropyxidaceae ==
Family: Heteropyxidaceae,

=== Heteropyxis ===
Genus Heteropyxis:

- Heteropyxis canescens Oliv. indigenous
- Heteropyxis dehniae Suess. indigenous
- Heteropyxis natalensis Harv. indigenous

== Lythraceae ==
Family: Lythraceae,

=== Ammannia ===
Genus Ammannia:

- Ammannia auriculata Willd. not indigenous, naturalised
  - Ammannia auriculata Willd. var. auriculata, not indigenous, naturalised
- Ammannia baccifera L. not indigenous, naturalised
  - Ammannia baccifera L. subsp. baccifera, not indigenous, naturalised
- Ammannia prieuriana Guill. & Perr. indigenous
- Ammannia pusilla Sond. accepted as Ammannia prieuriana Guill. & Perr. present
- Ammannia senegalensis Lam. indigenous

=== Cuphea ===
Genus Cuphea:

- Cuphea ignea A.DC. not indigenous, cultivated, naturalised
- Cuphea micropetala Humb. Bonpl. & Kunth, not indigenous, cultivated, naturalised

=== Galpinia ===
Genus Galpinia:

- Galpinia transvaalica N.E.Br. indigenous

=== Heimia ===
Genus Heimia:

- Heimia myrtifolia Cham. & Schltdl. not indigenous, naturalised, invasive
- Heimia salicifolia (Humb. Bonpl. & Kunth) Link & Otto, not indigenous, cultivated, naturalised

=== Lagerstroemia ===
Genus Lagerstroemia:

- Lagerstroemia indica L. not indigenous, cultivated, naturalised, invasive
- Lagerstroemia speciosa (L.) Pers. not indigenous, cultivated, naturalised

=== Lythrum ===
Genus Lythrum:

- Lythrum hyssopifolia L. not indigenous, naturalised, invasive
- Lythrum salicaria L. not indigenous, naturalised, invasive

=== Nesaea ===
Genus Nesaea:

- Nesaea alata Immelman, indigenous
- Nesaea anagalloides (Sond.) Koehne, indigenous
- Nesaea cordata Hiern, indigenous
- Nesaea crassicaulis (Guill. & Perr.) Koehne, indigenous
- Nesaea cymosa Immelman, indigenous
- Nesaea dinteri Koehne, indigenous
- Nesaea dinteri Koehne subsp. elata A.Fern. indigenous
- Nesaea drummondii A.Fern. indigenous
- Nesaea heptamera Hiern, indigenous
- Nesaea passerinoides (Welw. ex Hiern) Koehne, indigenous
- Nesaea radicans Guill. & Perr. indigenous
- Nesaea radicans Guill. & Perr. var. floribunda (Sond.) A.Fern. indigenous
- Nesaea rigidula (Sond.) Koehne, indigenous
- Nesaea sagittifolia (Sond.) Koehne, indigenous
  - Nesaea sagittifolia (Sond.) Koehne var. ericiformis Koehne forma ericiformis, endemic
  - Nesaea sagittifolia (Sond.) Koehne var. ericiformis Koehne forma swaziensis, indigenous
  - Nesaea sagittifolia (Sond.) Koehne var. sagittifolia, indigenous
- Nesaea schinzii Koehne, indigenous
- Nesaea schlechteri A.Fern. indigenous
- Nesaea tolypobotrys Koehne, endemic
- Nesaea wardii Immelman, endemic
- Nesaea woodii Koehne, endemic
- Nesaea zambatidis Immelman, indigenous

=== Punica ===
Genus Punica:

- Punica granatum L. not indigenous, cultivated, naturalised

=== Rotala ===
Genus Rotala:

- Rotala capensis (Harv.) A.Fern. & Diniz, indigenous
- Rotala filiformis (Bellardi) Hiern, indigenous
- Rotala mexicana Cham. & Schltdl. not indigenous, naturalised
- Rotala tenella (Guill. & Perr.) Hiern, indigenous

=== Trapa ===
Genus Trapa:

- Trapa natans L. indigenous
  - Trapa natans L. var. pumila Nakano ex Verdc. indigenous

== Melastomataceae ==
Family: Melastomataceae,

=== Antherotoma ===
Genus Antherotoma:

- Antherotoma debilis (Sond.) Jacq.-Fel. indigenous
- Antherotoma naudinii Hook.f. indigenous
- Antherotoma phaeotricha (Hochst.) Jacq.-Fel. indigenous

=== Dissotis ===
Genus Dissotis:

- Dissotis canescens (E.Mey. ex R.A.Graham) Hook.f. indigenous
- Dissotis debilis (Sond.) Triana, accepted as Antherotoma debilis (Sond.) Jacq.-Fel. present
  - Dissotis debilis (Sond.) Triana var. lanceolata (Cogn.) A.Fern. & R.Fern. accepted as Antherotoma debilis (Sond.) Jacq.-Fel.
- Dissotis phaeotricha (Hochst.) Hook.f. accepted as Antherotoma phaeotricha (Hochst.) Jacq.-Fel. present
- Dissotis princeps (Kunth) Triana, indigenous
  - Dissotis princeps (Kunth) Triana var. candolleana (Cogn.) A.Fern. & R.Fern. indigenous
  - Dissotis princeps (Kunth) Triana var. princeps, indigenous

=== Heterocentron ===
Genus Heterocentron:

- Heterocentron macrostachyum Naudin, not indigenous, naturalised
- Heterocentron subtriplinervium (Link & Otto) A.Braun & C.D.Bouche, not indigenous, naturalised

=== Melastoma ===
Genus Melastoma:

- Melastoma malabathricum L. not indigenous, naturalised, invasive

=== Pleroma ===
Genus Pleroma:

- Pleroma granulosum (Desr.) D.Don (syn. Tibouchina granulosa) not indigenous, cultivated, naturalised
- Pleroma urvilleanum (DC.) P.J.F.Guim. & Michelang. (syn. Tibouchina urvilleana) not indigenous, cultivated, naturalised

== Memecylaceae ==
Family: Memecylaceae,

=== Memecylon ===
Genus Memecylon:

- Memecylon bachmannii Engl. endemic
- Memecylon natalense Markgr. endemic
- Memecylon sousae A.Fern. & R.Fern. accepted as Warneckea sousae (A.Fern. & R.Fern.) A.E.van Wyk, present

=== Warneckea ===
Genus Warneckea:

- Warneckea parvifolia R.D.Stone & Ntetha, endemic
- Warneckea sousae (A.Fern. & R.Fern.) A.E.van Wyk, indigenous

== Myrtaceae ==
Family: Myrtaceae,

=== Agonis ===
Genus Agonis:

- Agonis flexuosa (Spreng.) Schauer, not indigenous, cultivated, naturalised

=== Callistemon ===
Genus Callistemon:

- Callistemon citrinus (Curtis) Skeels, accepted as Melaleuca citrina (Curtis) Dum.Cours. not indigenous, naturalised, invasive
- Callistemon rigidus R.Br. accepted as Melaleuca linearis Schrad. & J.C.Wendl. var. linearis, not indigenous, naturalised, invasive
- Callistemon rugulosus (Schltdl. ex Link) DC. accepted as Melaleuca rugulosa (Schltdl. ex Link) Craven
- Callistemon speciosus (Sims) DC. accepted as Melaleuca glauca (Sweet) Craven, not indigenous, naturalised
- Callistemon viminalis (Sol. ex Gaertn.) G.Don, accepted as Melaleuca viminalis (Sol. ex Gaertn.) Byrnes subsp. viminalis, not indigenous, naturalised, invasive

=== Calothamnus ===
Genus Calothamnus:

- Calothamnus pinifolius F.Muell. accepted as Melaleuca peucophylla Craven & R.D.Edwards

=== Corymbia ===
Genus Corymbia:

- Corymbia citriodora (Hook.) K.D.Hill & L.A.S.Johnson, not indigenous, cultivated, naturalised
- Corymbia ficifolia (F.Muell.) K.D.Hill & L.A.S.Johnson, not indigenous, cultivated, naturalised, invasive

=== Eucalyptus ===
Genus Eucalyptus:

- Eucalyptus botryoides Sm. not indigenous, cultivated, naturalised, invasive
- Eucalyptus camaldulensis Dehnh. not indigenous, cultivated, naturalised, invasive
- Eucalyptus citriodora Hook. accepted as Corymbia citriodora (Hook.) K.D.Hill & L.A.S.Johnson, not indigenous, cultivated, naturalised
- Eucalyptus cladocalyx F.Muell. not indigenous, cultivated, naturalised, invasive
- Eucalyptus conferruminata D.J.Carr & S.G.M.Carr, not indigenous, cultivated, naturalised, invasive
- Eucalyptus diversicolor F.Muell. not indigenous, cultivated, naturalised, invasive
- Eucalyptus globulus Labill. subsp. maidenii (F.Muell.) Kirkp. not indigenous, cultivated, naturalised
- Eucalyptus gomphocephala DC. not indigenous, cultivated, naturalised, invasive
- Eucalyptus grandis W.Hill ex Maiden, not indigenous, cultivated, naturalised, invasive
- Eucalyptus longifolia Link & Otto, not indigenous, naturalised
- Eucalyptus microcorys F.Muell. not indigenous, cultivated, naturalised, invasive
- Eucalyptus microtheca F.Muell. not indigenous, naturalised
- Eucalyptus regnans F.Muell. not indigenous, naturalised
- Eucalyptus sideroxylon A.Cunn. ex Woolls, not indigenous, cultivated, naturalised, invasive
- Eucalyptus tereticornis Sm. not indigenous, cultivated, naturalised, invasive

=== Eugenia ===
Genus Eugenia:

- Eugenia albanensis Sond. endemic
- Eugenia capensis (Eckl. & Zeyh.) Sond. indigenous
  - Eugenia capensis (Eckl. & Zeyh.) Sond. subsp. a, indigenous
  - Eugenia capensis (Eckl. & Zeyh.) Sond. subsp. capensis, indigenous
  - Eugenia capensis (Eckl. & Zeyh.) Sond. subsp. gueinzii (Sond.) F.White, endemic
- Eugenia erythrophylla Strey, endemic
- Eugenia gueinzii Sond. accepted as Eugenia capensis (Eckl. & Zeyh.) Sond. subsp. gueinzii (Sond.) F.White, present
- Eugenia mossambicensis Engl. accepted as Eugenia capensis (Eckl. & Zeyh.) Sond. subsp. a, present
- Eugenia natalitia Sond. indigenous
- Eugenia pusilla N.E.Br. endemic
- Eugenia simii Dummer, endemic
- Eugenia umtamvunensis A.E.van Wyk, endemic
- Eugenia uniflora L. not indigenous, naturalised, invasive
- Eugenia verdoorniae A.E.van Wyk, endemic
- Eugenia woodii Dummer, indigenous
- Eugenia zeyheri (Harv.) Harv. endemic
- Eugenia zuluensis Dummer, endemic

=== Leptospermum ===
Genus Leptospermum:

- Leptospermum continentale Joy Thomps. not indigenous, naturalised
- Leptospermum laevigatum (Gaertn.) F.Muell. not indigenous, naturalised, invasive
- Leptospermum micromyrtus Miq. not indigenous, naturalised
- Leptospermum scoparium J.R.Forst. & G.Forst. not indigenous, naturalised, invasive
- Leptospermum squarrosum Gaertn. not indigenous, cultivated, naturalised

=== Melaleuca ===
Genus Melaleuca:

- Melaleuca armillaris (Sol. ex Gaertn.) Sm. not indigenous, cultivated, naturalised
  - Melaleuca armillaris (Sol. ex Gaertn.) Sm. subsp. armillaris, not indigenous, cultivated, naturalised, invasive
- Melaleuca citrina (Curtis) Dum.Cours. not indigenous, cultivated, naturalised, invasive
- Melaleuca cruenta Craven & R.D.Edwards, not indigenous, naturalised
- Melaleuca diosmifolia Andrews, not indigenous, cultivated, naturalised
- Melaleuca elliptica Labill. not indigenous, cultivated, naturalised
- Melaleuca hypericifolia Sm. not indigenous, cultivated, naturalised, invasive
- Melaleuca linearis Schrad. & J.C.Wendl. var. linearis, not indigenous, cultivated, naturalised, invasive
- Melaleuca nesophila F.Muell. not indigenous, cultivated, naturalised
- Melaleuca parvistaminea Byrnes, not indigenous, naturalised, invasive
- Melaleuca peucophylla Craven & R.D.Edwards, not indigenous, naturalised
- Melaleuca quadrifida (R.Br.) Craven & R.D.Edwards subsp. quadrifida, not indigenous, naturalised
- Melaleuca quinquenervia (Cav.) S.T.Blake, not indigenous, cultivated, naturalised, invasive
- Melaleuca rugulosa (Schltdl. ex Link) Craven, not indigenous, cultivated, naturalised, invasive
- Melaleuca salicina Craven, not indigenous, cultivated, naturalised
- Melaleuca styphelioides Sm. not indigenous, cultivated, naturalised
- Melaleuca subulata (Cheel) Craven, not indigenous, naturalised
- Melaleuca viminalis (Sol. ex Gaertn.) Byrnes subsp. viminalis, not indigenous, cultivated, naturalised, invasive

=== Metrosideros ===
Genus Metrosideros:

- Metrosideros angustifolia (L.) Sm. endemic
- Metrosideros excelsa Sol. ex Gaertn. not indigenous, cultivated, naturalised, invasive
- Metrosideros tomentosa A.Rich. accepted as Metrosideros excelsa Sol. ex Gaertn. not indigenous, naturalised

=== Myrtus ===
Genus Myrtus:

- Myrtus communis L. var. communis, not indigenous, naturalised

=== Psidium ===
Genus Psidium:

- Psidium cattleianum Sabine, not indigenous, naturalised, invasive
- Psidium guajava L. not indigenous, naturalised, invasive
- Psidium guineense Sw. not indigenous, naturalised, invasive

=== Syncarpia ===
Genus Syncarpia:

- Syncarpia glomulifera (Sm.) Nied. not indigenous, cultivated, naturalised

=== Syzygium ===
Genus Syzygium:

- Syzygium australe (J.C.Wendl. ex Link) B.Hyland, not indigenous, cultivated, naturalised, invasive
- Syzygium cordatum Hochst. ex C.Krauss, indigenous
  - Syzygium cordatum Hochst. ex C.Krauss subsp. cordatum, indigenous
- Syzygium cumini (L.) Skeels, not indigenous, cultivated, naturalised, invasive
- Syzygium gerrardi (Harv. ex Hook.f.) Burtt Davy, indigenous
- Syzygium guineense (Willd.) DC. indigenous
  - Syzygium guineense (Willd.) DC. subsp. barotsense F.White, indigenous
  - Syzygium guineense (Willd.) DC. subsp. guineense, indigenous
- Syzygium intermedium Engl. & Brehmer, indigenous
- Syzygium jambos (L.) Alston, not indigenous, naturalised, invasive
- Syzygium legatii Burtt Davy & Greenway, endemic
- Syzygium pondoense Engl. endemic

== Oliniaceae ==
Family: Oliniaceae,

=== Cremastostemon ===
Genus Cremastostemon:

- Cremastostemon capensis Jacq. accepted as Olinia capensis (Jacq.) Klotzsch, indigenous

=== Olinia ===
Genus Olinia:

- Olinia acuminata Klotzsch, accepted as Olinia capensis (Jacq.) Klotzsch, indigenous
- Olinia capensis (Jacq.) Klotzsch, endemic
- Olinia cymosa (L.f.) Thunb. accepted as Olinia ventosa (L.) Cufod. indigenous
  - Olinia cymosa (L.f.) Thunb. var. acuminata (Klotzsch) Sond. accepted as Olinia capensis (Jacq.) Klotzsch, indigenous
- Olinia cymosa (L.f.) Thunb. var. latifolia Sond. accepted as Olinia ventosa (L.) Cufod. indigenous
- Olinia emarginata Burtt Davy, indigenous
- Olinia huillensis Welw. ex A.Fern. & R.Fern. indigenous
  - Olinia huillensis Welw. ex A.Fern. & R.Fern. subsp. burttdavii Sebola, endemic
  - Olinia huillensis Welw. ex A.Fern. & R.Fern. subsp. huillensis, indigenous
- Olinia micrantha Decne. endemic
- Olinia radiata Hofmeyr & E.Phillips, endemic
- Olinia rochetiana A.Juss. indigenous
- Olinia ventosa (L.) Cufod. endemic

== Onagraceae ==
Family: Onagraceae,

=== Epilobium ===
Genus Epilobium:

- Epilobium capense Buchinger ex Hochst. indigenous
- Epilobium hirsutum L. indigenous
- Epilobium karsteniae Compton, accepted as Epilobium capense Buchinger ex Hochst.
- Epilobium salignum Hausskn. indigenous
- Epilobium tetragonum L. indigenous
  - Epilobium tetragonum L. subsp. tetragonum, indigenous

=== Gaura ===
Genus Gaura:

- Gaura lindheimeri Engelm. & A.Gray, accepted as Oenothera lindheimeri (Engelm. & A.Gray) W.L.Wagner & Hoch, not indigenous, naturalised
- Gaura sinuata Nutt. ex Ser. accepted as Oenothera sinuosa W.L.Wagner & Hoch, not indigenous, naturalised
- Gaura sp. accepted as Oenothera sp.

=== Ludwigia ===
Genus Ludwigia:

- Ludwigia abyssinica A.Rich. indigenous
- Ludwigia adscendens (L.) Hara, indigenous
  - Ludwigia adscendens (L.) Hara subsp. diffusa (Forssk.) P.H.Raven, indigenous
- Ludwigia leptocarpa (Nutt.) Hara, indigenous
- Ludwigia octovalvis (Jacq.) P.H.Raven, indigenous
  - Ludwigia octovalvis (Jacq.) P.H.Raven subsp. brevisepala (Brenan) P.H.Raven, accepted as Ludwigia octovalvis (Jacq.) P.H.Raven, present
  - Ludwigia octovalvis (Jacq.) P.H.Raven subsp. sessiliflora (Micheli) P.H.Raven, accepted as Ludwigia octovalvis (Jacq.) P.H.Raven, present
- Ludwigia palustris (L.) Elliott, not indigenous, naturalised
- Ludwigia polycarpa Short & R.Peter ex Torr. & A.Gray, not indigenous, naturalised
- Ludwigia stolonifera (Guill. & Perr.) P.H.Raven, accepted as Ludwigia adscendens (L.) Hara subsp. diffusa (Forssk.) P.H.Raven, present

=== Oenothera ===
Genus Oenothera:

- Oenothera affinis Cambess. not indigenous, naturalised, invasive
- Oenothera biennis L. not indigenous, naturalised, invasive
- Oenothera drummondii Hook. subsp. drummondii, not indigenous, naturalised, invasive
- Oenothera erythrosepala (Borbas) Borbas, accepted as Oenothera glazioviana Micheli, not indigenous, naturalised
- Oenothera glazioviana Micheli, not indigenous, naturalised, invasive
- Oenothera grandiflora Aiton, not indigenous, naturalised, invasive
- Oenothera indecora Cambess. not indigenous, naturalised
  - Oenothera indecora Cambess. subsp. bonariensis W.Dietr. accepted as Oenothera indecora Cambess. not indigenous, naturalised
- Oenothera jamesii Torr. & A.Gray, not indigenous, naturalised, invasive
- Oenothera laciniata Hill, not indigenous, naturalised, invasive
- Oenothera lindheimeri (Engelm. & A.Gray) W.L.Wagner & Hoch, not indigenous, naturalised, invasive
- Oenothera longiflora L. subsp. longiflora, not indigenous, naturalised, invasive
- Oenothera parodiana Munz, not indigenous, naturalised, invasive
- Oenothera parviflora L. not indigenous, naturalised, invasive
- Oenothera rosea L'Her. ex Aiton, not indigenous, naturalised, invasive
- Oenothera sinuosa W.L.Wagner & Hoch, not indigenous, naturalised, invasive
- Oenothera stricta Ledeb. ex Link subsp. stricta, not indigenous, naturalised, invasive
- Oenothera tetraptera Cav. not indigenous, naturalised, invasive
- Oenothera villosa Thunb. not indigenous, naturalised, invasive

== Penaeaceae ==
Family: Penaeaceae,

=== Brachysiphon ===
Genus Brachysiphon:

- Brachysiphon acutus (Thunb.) A.Juss. endemic
- Brachysiphon fucatus (L.) Gilg, endemic
- Brachysiphon microphyllus Rourke, endemic
- Brachysiphon mundii Sond. endemic
- Brachysiphon rupestris Sond. endemic

=== Endonema ===
Genus Endonema:

- Endonema lateriflora (L.f.) Gilg, endemic
- Endonema retzioides Sond. endemic

=== Glischrocolla ===
Genus Glischrocolla:

- Glischrocolla formosa (Thunb.) R.Dahlgren, endemic

=== Penaea ===
Genus Penaea:

- Penaea acutifolia A.Juss. endemic
- Penaea cneorum Meerb. indigenous
  - Penaea cneorum Meerb. subsp. cneorum, endemic
  - Penaea cneorum Meerb. subsp. gigantea R.Dahlgren, endemic
  - Penaea cneorum Meerb. subsp. lanceolata R.Dahlgren, endemic
  - Penaea cneorum Meerb. subsp. ovata (Eckl. & Zeyh. ex A.DC.) R.Dahlgren, endemic
  - Penaea cneorum Meerb. subsp. ruscifolia R.Dahlgren, endemic
- Penaea dahlgrenii Rourke, endemic
- Penaea mucronata L. endemic

=== Saltera ===
Genus Saltera:

- Saltera sarcocolla (L.) Bullock, endemic

=== Sonderothamnus ===
Genus Sonderothamnus:

- Sonderothamnus petraeus (W.F.Barker) R.Dahlgren, endemic
- Sonderothamnus speciosus (Sond.) R.Dahlgren, endemic

=== Stylapterus ===
Genus Stylapterus:

- Stylapterus barbatus A.Juss. endemic
- Stylapterus candolleanus (Steph.) R.Dahlgren, endemic
- Stylapterus dubius (Steph.) R.Dahlgren, endemic
- Stylapterus ericifolius (A.Juss.) R.Dahlgren, endemic
- Stylapterus ericoides A.Juss. indigenous
  - Stylapterus ericoides A.Juss. subsp. ericoides, endemic
  - Stylapterus ericoides A.Juss. subsp. pallidus R.Dahlgren, endemic
- Stylapterus fruticulosus (L.f.) A.Juss. endemic
- Stylapterus micranthus R.Dahlgren, endemic
- Stylapterus sulcatus R.Dahlgren, endemic

== Rhynchocalycaceae ==
Family: Rhynchocalycaceae,

=== Rhynchocalyx ===
Genus Rhynchocalyx:

- Rhynchocalyx lawsonioides Oliv. endemic
