= Dactylispa spinulosa =

Scientific classification
- Kingdom: Animalia
- Phylum: Arthropoda
- Clade: Pancrustacea
- Class: Insecta
- Order: Coleoptera
- Suborder: Polyphaga
- Infraorder: Cucujiformia
- Family: Chrysomelidae
- Genus: Dactylispa
- Species: D. spinulosa

Binomial name
- Dactylispa spinulosa (Gyllenhal, 1817)

Synonyms
- Hispa spinulosa Gyllenhal, 1817; Hispa armata Guérin-Méneville, 1841; Dactylispa spinulosa salaamensis Weise, 1897; Hispa sobrina Péringuey, 1898; Dactylispa similis Achard, 1917; Dactylispa vicina Uhmann, 1928; Dactylispa spinulosa rufigaster Uhmann, 1956

Species of beetle

Dactylispa spinulosa is a species of beetle of the family Chrysomelidae. It is found in Angola, Cameroon, Congo, Equatorial Guinea, Ethiopia, Guinea, Guinea Bissau, Ivory Coast, Kenya, Liberia, Nigeria, Rwanda, Senegal, Sierra Leone, Somalia, South Africa, Tanzania, Togo and Uganda.

== Life history ==
The recorded host plants for this species are Setaria sphacelata, Sporobolus pyramidalis, Panicum maximum, Loudetia arundinacea, Loudetia simulans, Urelytrum giganteum, Imperata cylindrica, Jussiaea repens and Rottboellia exaltata.
