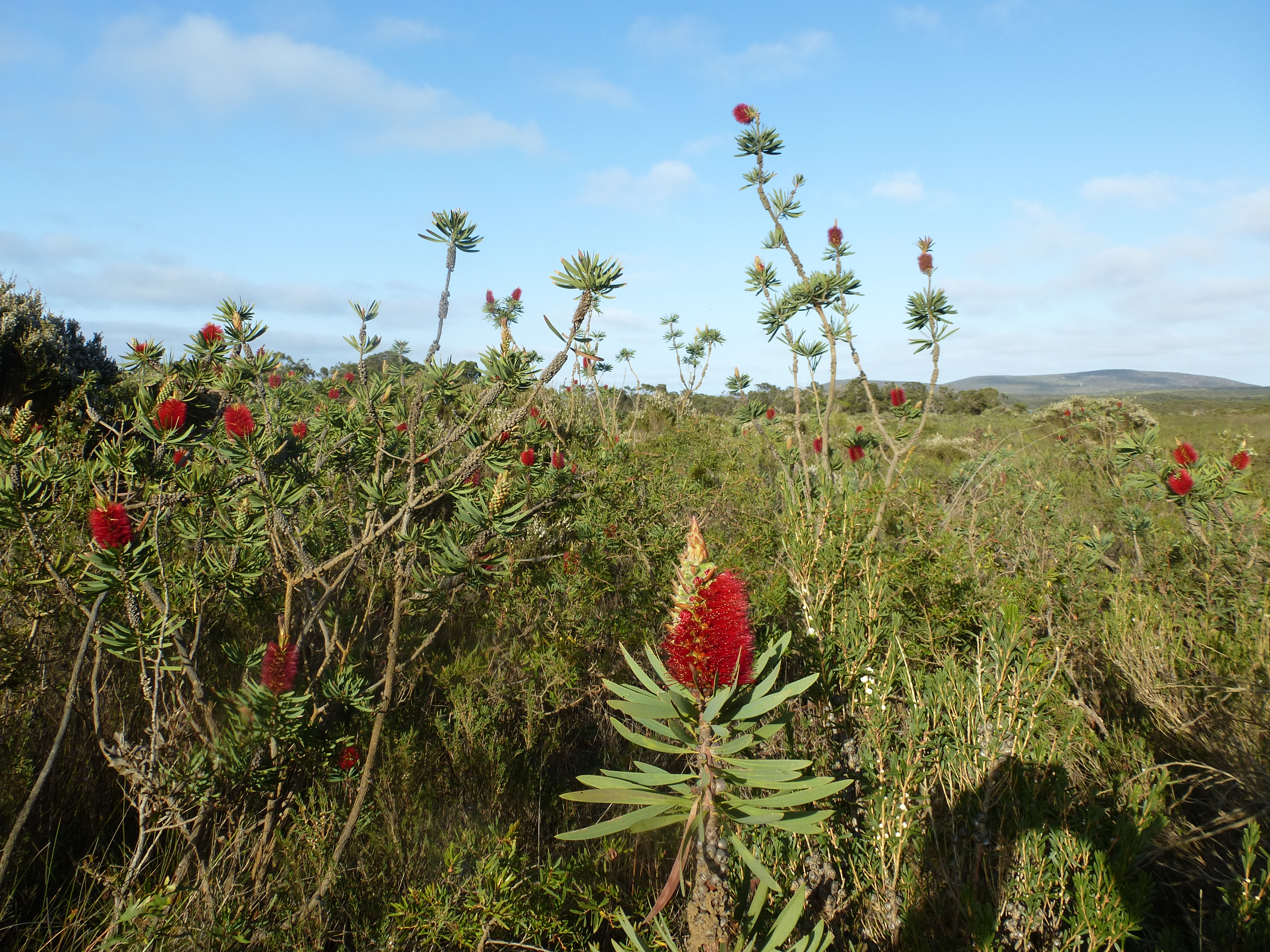
- Melaleuca glauca

Scientific classification
- Kingdom: Plantae
- Clade: Tracheophytes
- Clade: Angiosperms
- Clade: Eudicots
- Clade: Rosids
- Order: Myrtales
- Family: Myrtaceae
- Genus: Melaleuca
- Species: M. glauca

Binomial name
- Melaleuca glauca (Sweet) Craven

Synonyms
- List: Callistemon glaucus (DC.) Sweet; Callistemon heleogiton Domin; Callistemon salignus var. paludosus (R.Br.) F.Muell.; Callistemon speciosus (Sims) Colvill ex Sweet; Callistemon speciosus var. glaucus DC.; Melaleuca paludosa R.Br.; Metrosideros crassifolia Dum.Cours.; Metrosideros glauca Dum.Cours.; Metrosideros glauca Bonpl.; Metrosideros speciosa Sims

= Melaleuca glauca =

Albany bottlebrush

Species of flowering plant

Melaleuca glauca, commonly known as Albany bottlebrush is a plant in the myrtle family, Myrtaceae and is endemic to the south-west of Western Australia. (Some Australian state herbaria continue to use the name Callistemon glaucus. Lyndley Craven claims that there is no type material for Callistemon speciosus and includes it here as a synonym.) It is a tall shrub with glaucous leaves and spikes of red flowers in spring.

== Description ==
Melaleuca glauca is a shrub growing to 3.5 m (10 ft) tall with hard, fibrous bark. Its leaves are arranged alternately and are 40–128 mm (2–5 in) long, 3–18 mm (0.1–0.7 in) wide, flat, mostly narrow egg-shaped with a mid-vein and 11 to 20 branching veins.

The flowers are bright red and arranged in spikes on the ends of branches which continue to grow after flowering. The spikes are up to 75 mm (3 in) in diameter with 20 to 120 or more individual flowers. The petals are 4.5–7.2 mm (0.18–0.28 in) long and fall off as the flower ages. The stamens are arranged in five bundles around the flower and there are between 6 and 15 stamens per bundle. Flowering occurs from October to December and is followed by fruit which are woody capsules, 5.7–8.8 mm (0.2–0.3 in) long.

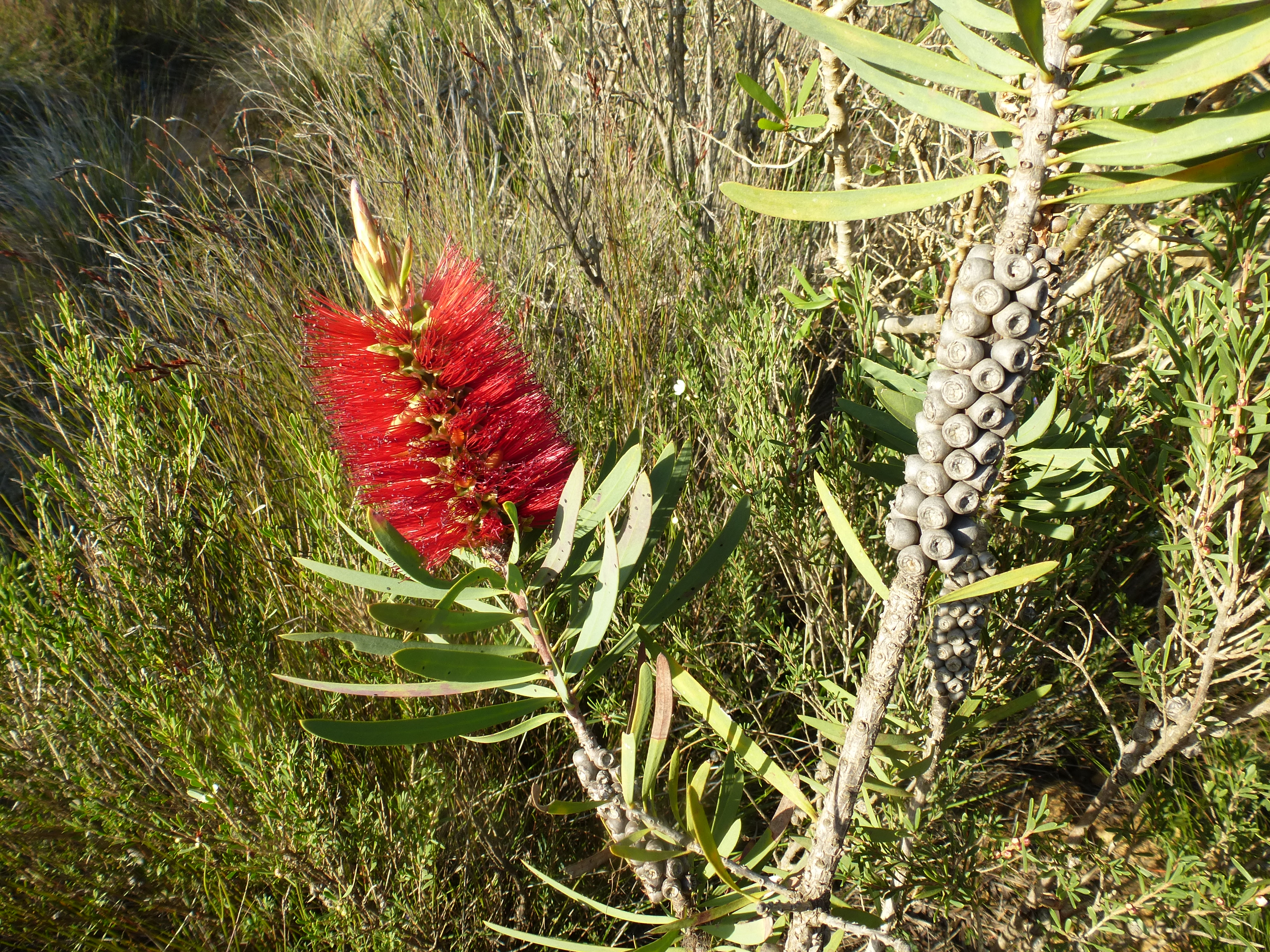
Habit in Gull Rock National Park

== Taxonomy and naming ==
The Albany bottlebrush was first formally described in 1830 by the English botanist Robert Sweet, who gave it the name Callistemon glaucus and published the description in his book Hortus Britannicus. In 2013, Lyndley Craven changed the name to Melaleuca glauca and published the name change in Melaleucas : their botany, essential oils and uses.

In 1815 Aimé Bonpland described Metrosideros glauca but the name was not a validly published name (a nom. illeg.), having already been used by Georges de Courset in 1811. Callistemon glaucus is regarded as a synonym of Melaleuca glauca by the Royal Botanic Gardens, Kew.

The specific epithet (glauca) is from the Latin glaucus meaning "glaucous", referring to the leaves seen by Bonpland.

== Distribution and habitat ==
Melaleuca glauca occurs in the south and south-western coastal districts of Western Australia between Perth and Albany in the Jarrah Forest, Swan Coastal Plain and Warren biogeographic regions, where it grows in swampy ground in sandy or clayey soils.

== Conservation status ==
Melaleuca glauca is listed as not threatened by the Government of Western Australia Department of Parks and Wildlife.

== Use in horticulture ==
Melaleuca glauca is widely grown as an ornamental (as Callistemon glaucus) in temperate parts of Australia.
