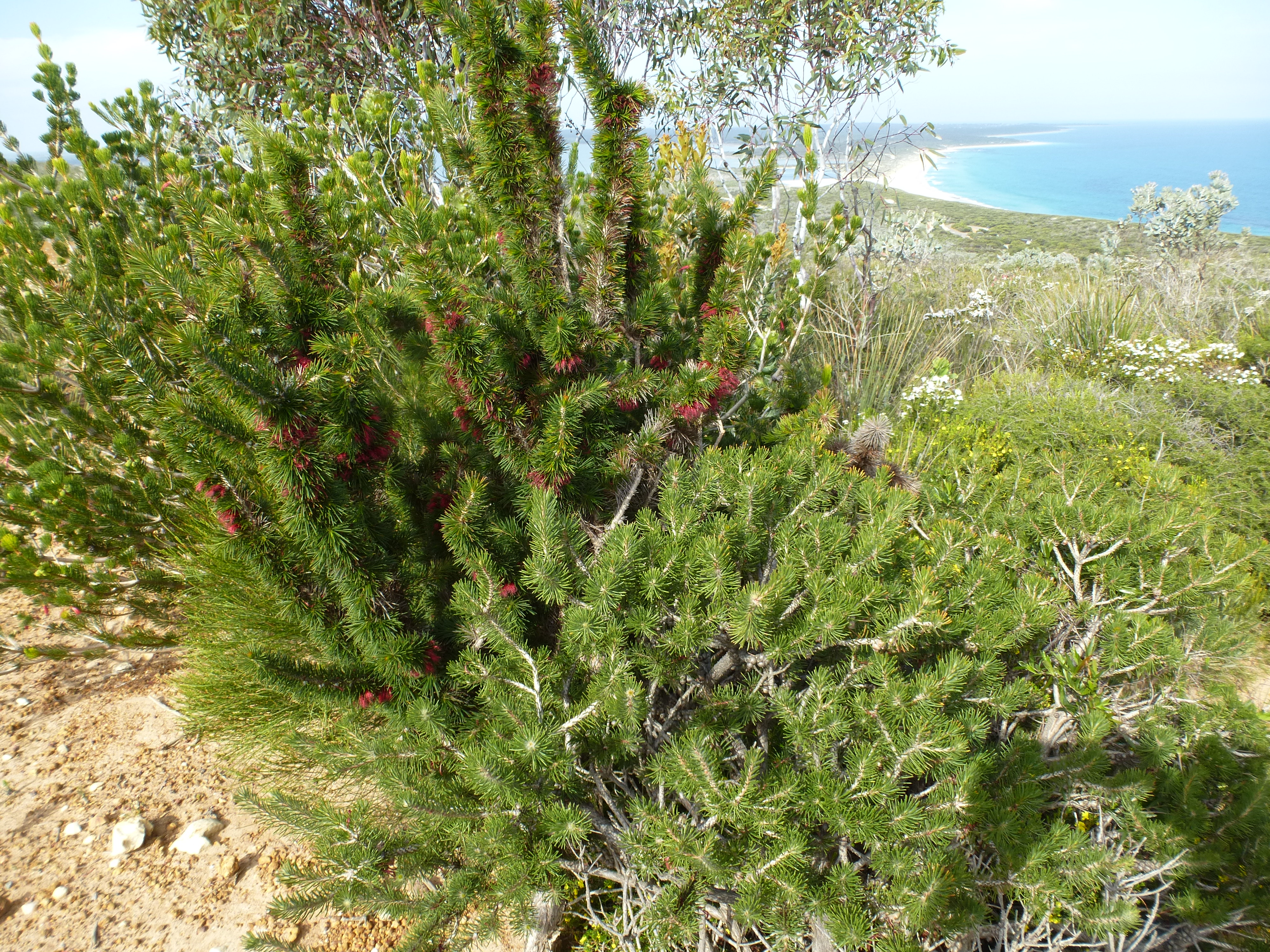
- At East Mount Barren

Scientific classification
- Kingdom: Plantae
- Clade: Tracheophytes
- Clade: Angiosperms
- Clade: Eudicots
- Clade: Rosids
- Order: Myrtales
- Family: Myrtaceae
- Genus: Calothamnus
- Species: C. pinifolius

Binomial name
- Calothamnus pinifolius F.Muell.

Synonyms
- Calothamnus pinifolia F.Muell. orth. var.; Melaleuca peucophylla Craven & R.D.Edwards

= Calothamnus pinifolius =

Species of flowering plant

Calothamnus pinifolius, commonly known as dense clawflower, is a plant in the myrtle family, Myrtaceae and is endemic to the south-west of Western Australia. It is an erect shrub with dense foliage and clusters of red flowers, partly immersed in the prickly foliage, between July and January.

== Description ==
Calothamnus pinifolius is an erect shrub that grows to 0.3–2.0 m (1–7 ft) high with a few long shoots and branches and a short shoot emerging from above the leaves of every long one. Its leaves are about 20–30 mm (0.8–1 in) long, crowded, thin and prickly.

The flowers are in dense clusters, usually partly hidden by the foliage and have 4 sepals, 4 petals and 4 claw-like bundles of stamens about 25 mm (1 in) long. Flowering occurs between July and January. Flowering is followed by fruits which are woody capsules which have two prominent, curved lobes.

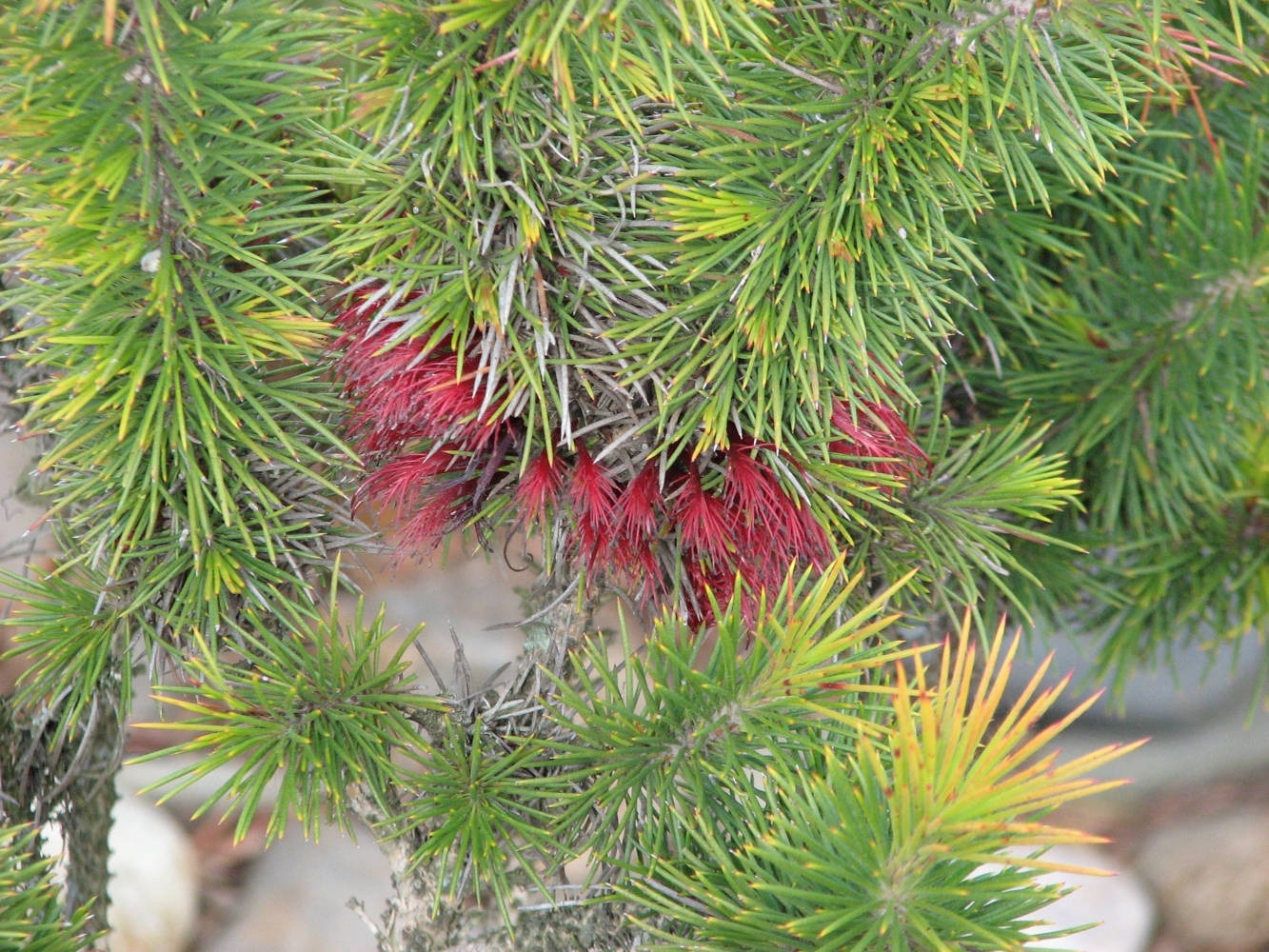
Cultivated specimen in the Royal Botanic Gardens, Cranbourne

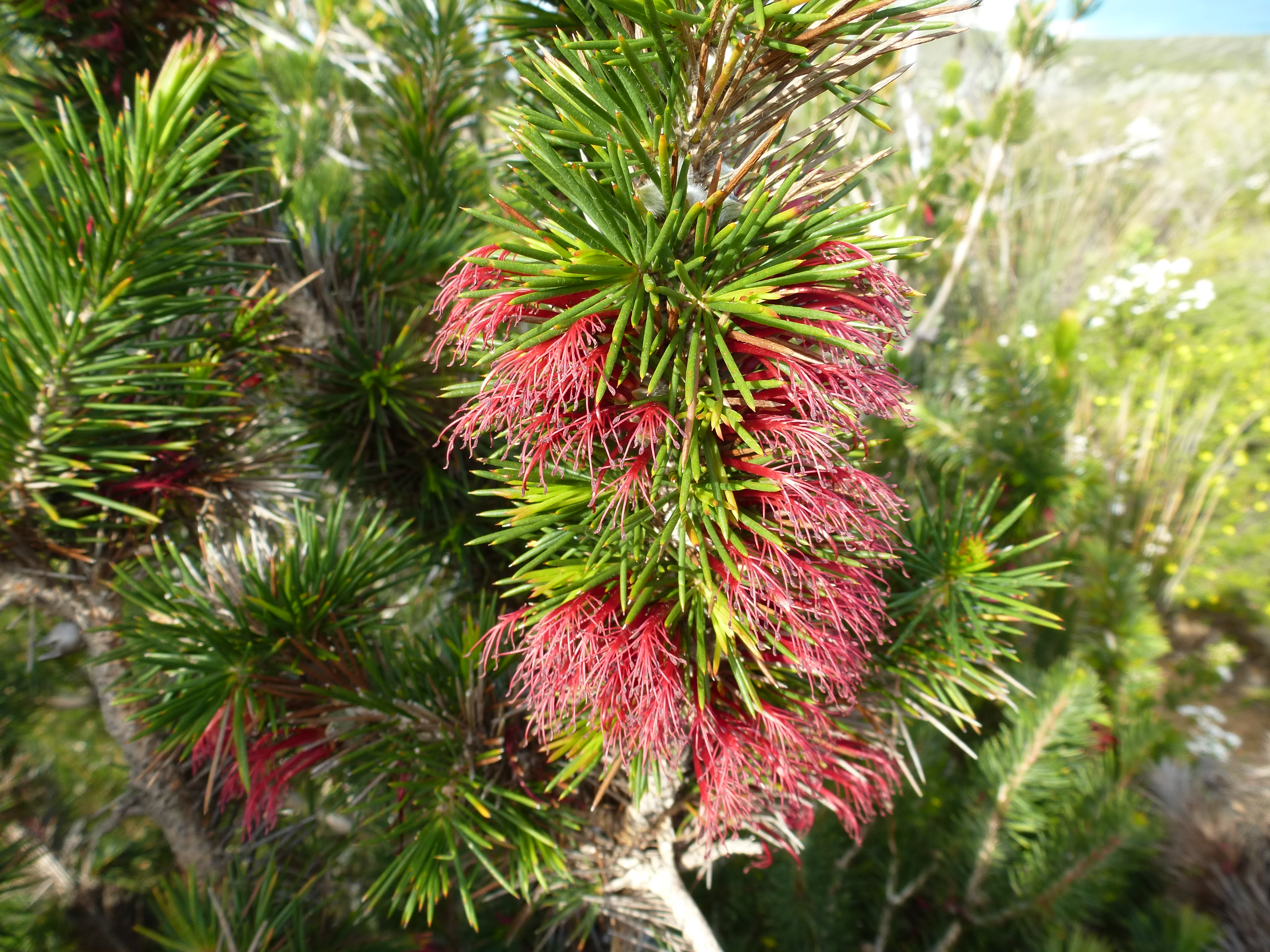
Foliage and flowers

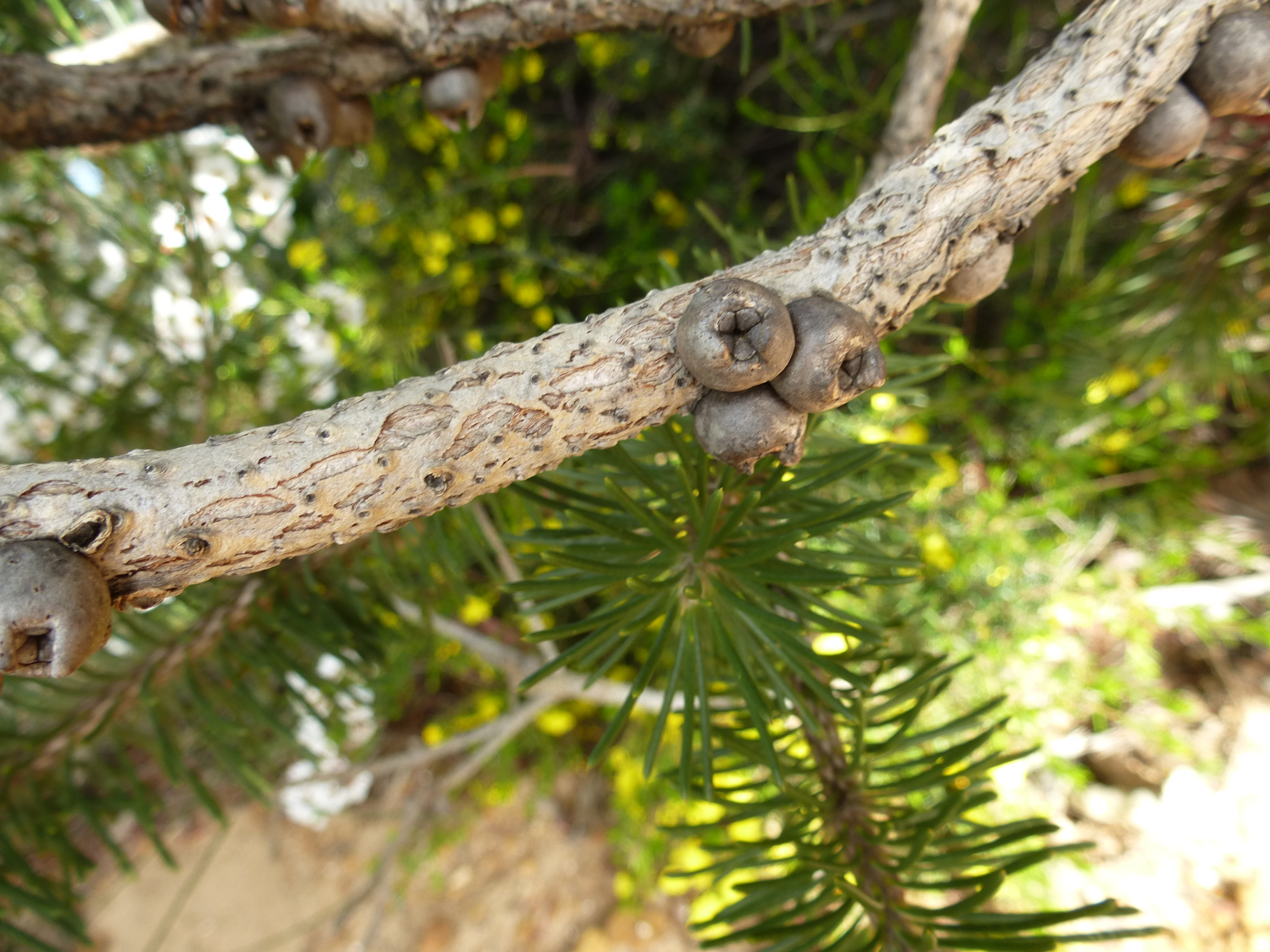
Fruit

== Taxonomy and naming ==
Calothamnus pinifolius was first formally described in 1863 by Victorian Government botanist Ferdinand von Mueller in the third volume of Fragmenta Phytographiae Australiae. (In 2014 Lyndley Craven, Edwards and Cowley proposed that the species be renamed Melaleuca peucophylla.) The specific epithet (pinifolius) is from the Latin words pinus meaning "pine" and folium meaning "leaf".

== Distribution and habitat ==
Calothamnus pinifolius occurs in the Mount Barren Range in the Esperance Plains biogeographic region. It grows on slopes in dense scrub in rocky soils derived from laterite and quartzite.
