= Sepal =

Any of the separate parts of the calyx of a flower (excluding the bracts), usually green

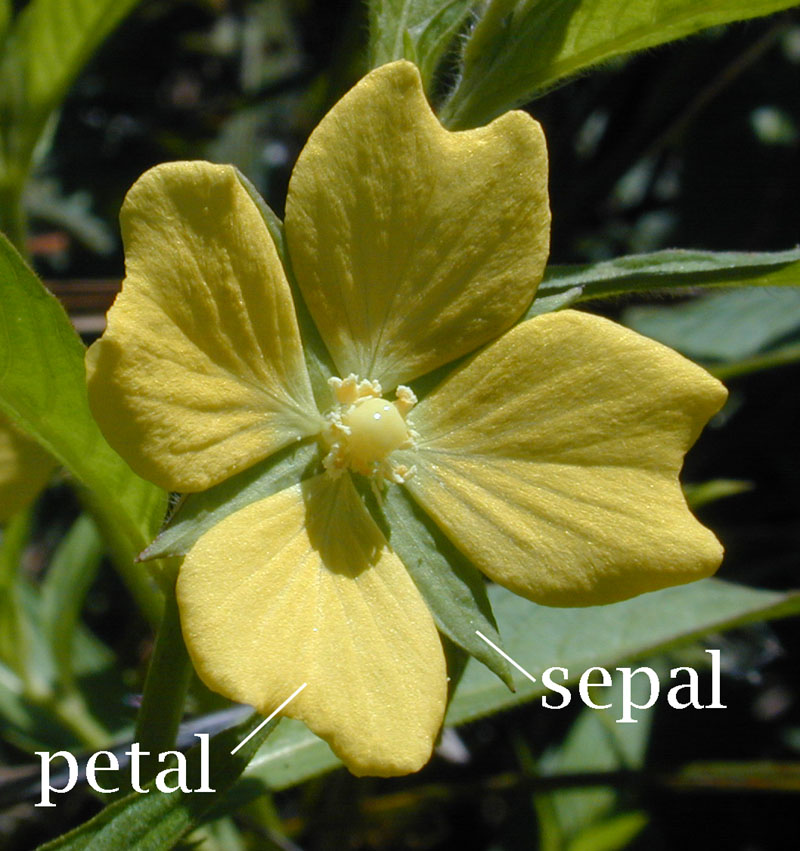
Tetramerous flower of Ludwigia octovalvis showing petals and sepals

A sepal (/ˈsɛpəl, ˈsiːpəl/) is a part of the flower of angiosperms (flowering plants). Usually green, sepals typically function as protection for the flower in bud, and often as support for the petals when in bloom. Collectively, the sepals are called the calyx or calix.

== Etymology ==
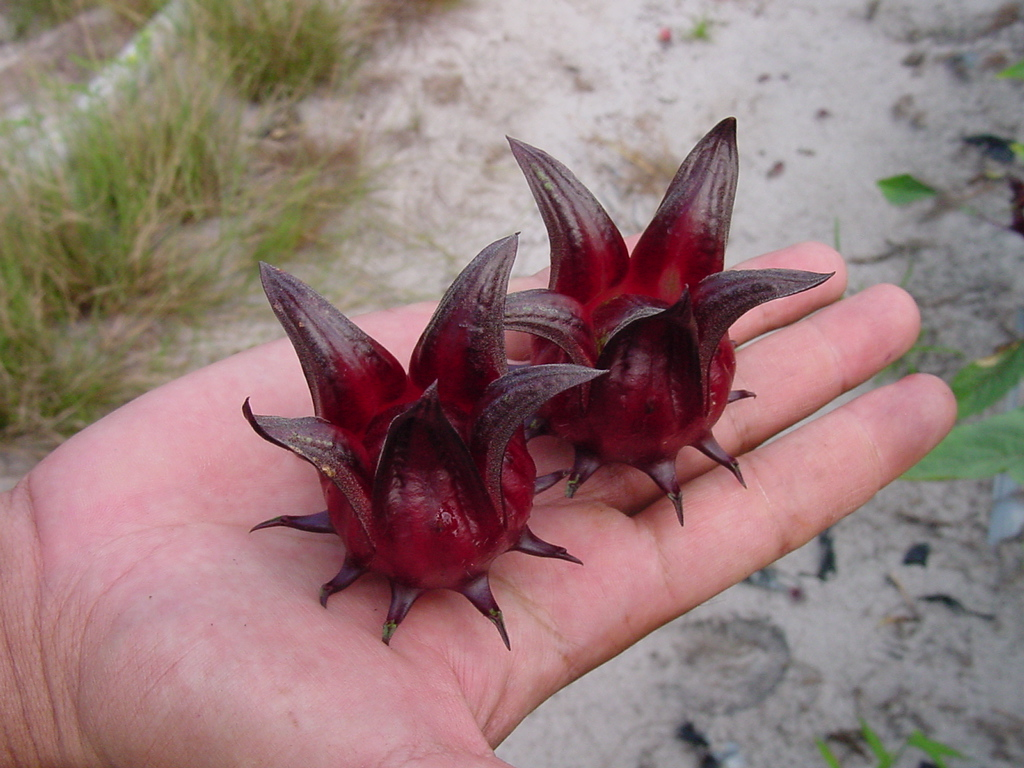
After blooming, the sepals of Hibiscus sabdariffa expand into an edible accessory fruit.

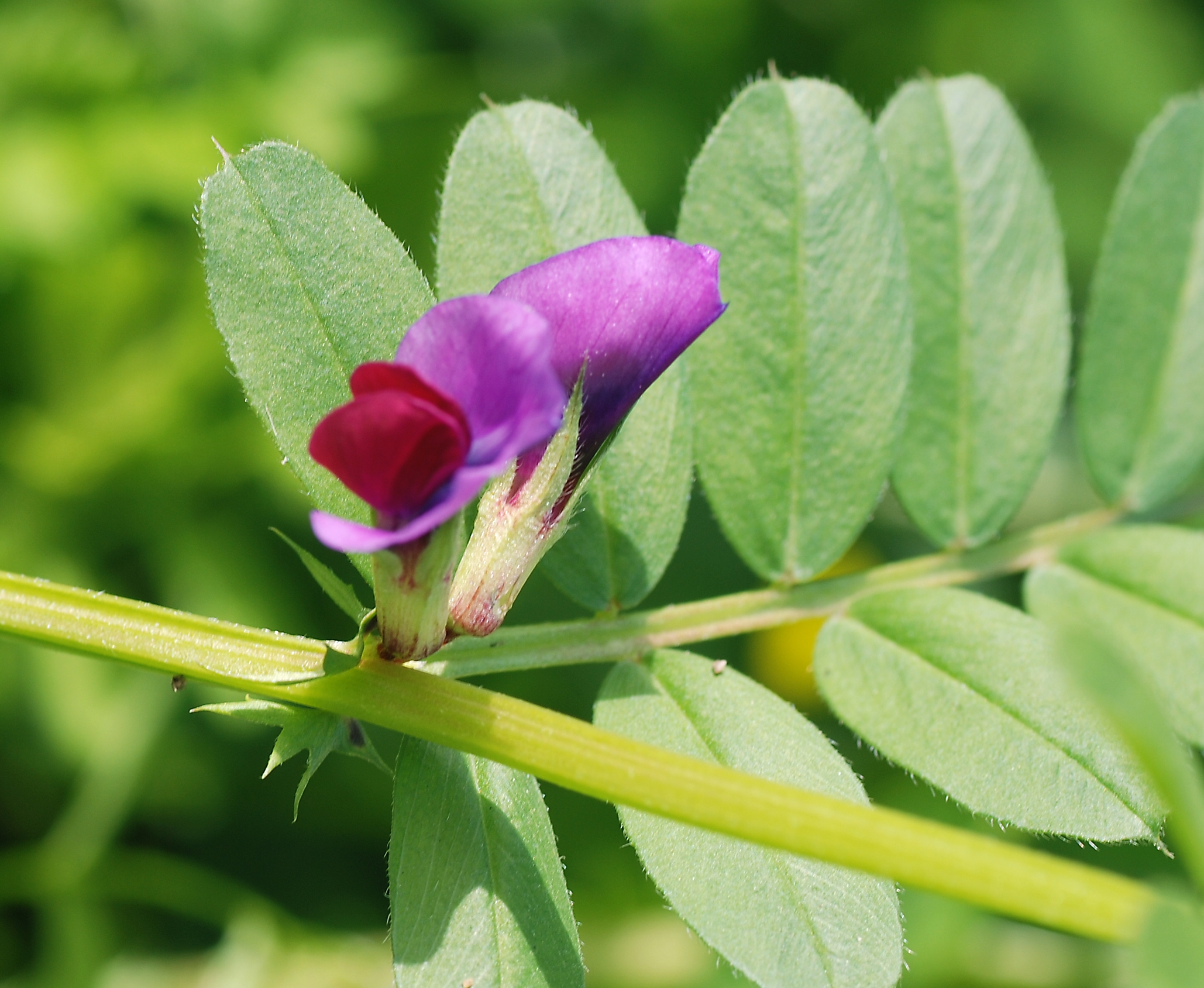
In many Fabaceae flowers, a calyx tube surrounds the petals.

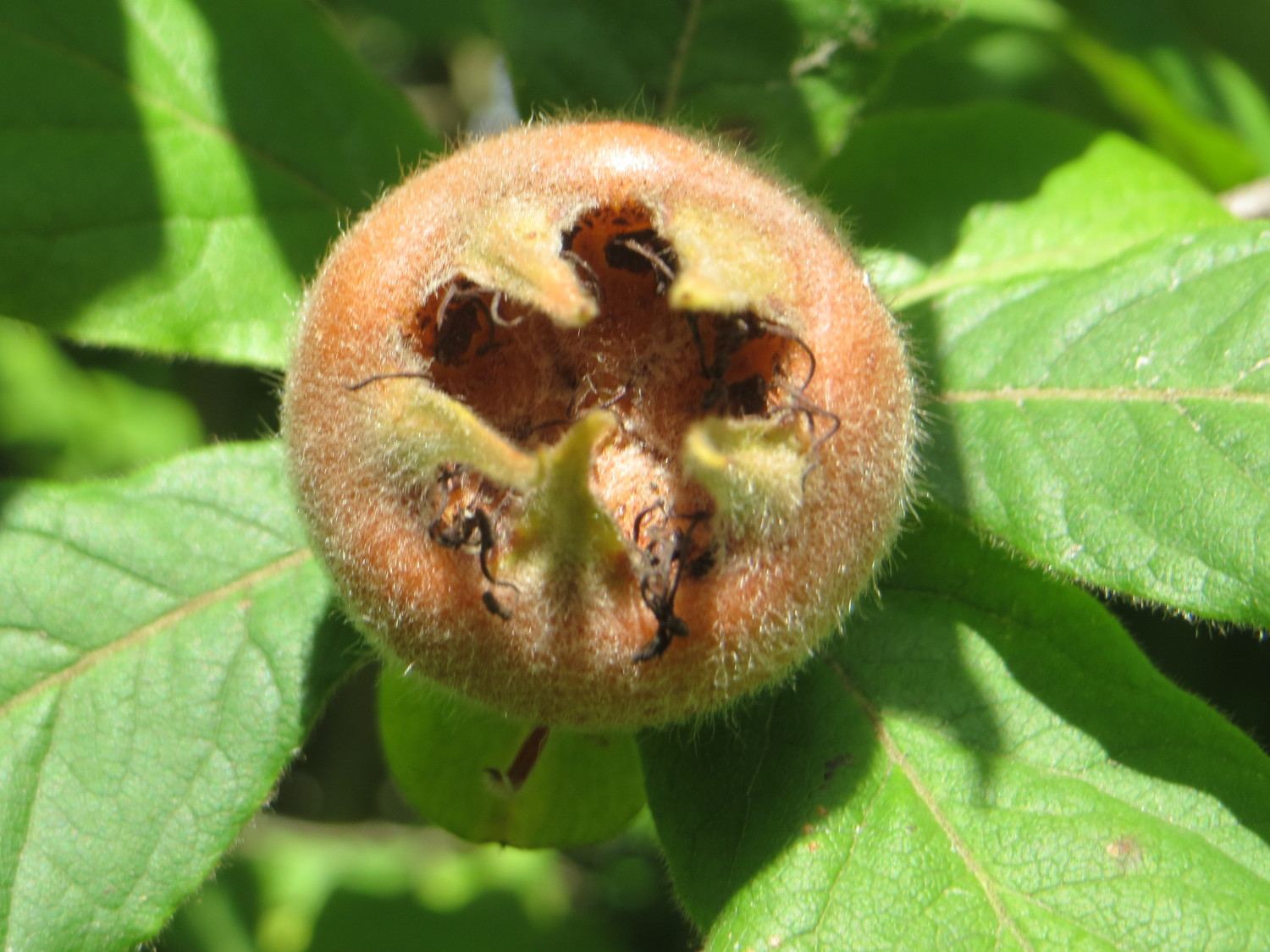
The large calyx of the medlar fruit is the source of its vulgar nicknames.

The term sepalum was coined by Noël Martin Joseph de Necker in 1790, and derived from Ancient Greek σκέπη (sképē) 'covering'.

Collectively, the sepals are called the calyx (plural: calyces), the outermost whorl of parts that form a flower. The word calyx was adopted from the Latin calyx, not to be confused with calix 'cup, goblet'. The Latin calyx is derived from Greek κάλυξ kalyx 'bud, calyx, husk, wrapping' (cf. Sanskrit kalika 'bud'), while calix is derived from Greek κύλιξ kylix 'cup, goblet'; both words have been used interchangeably in botanical Latin.

== Description ==
Sepals are usually green. The term tepal is usually applied when the parts of the perianth are difficult to distinguish, e.g. the petals and sepals share the same color or the petals are absent and the sepals are colorful. When the undifferentiated tepals resemble petals, they are referred to as "petaloid", as in petaloid monocots, orders of monocots with brightly colored tepals. Since they include Liliales, an alternative name is lilioid monocots. Examples of plants in which the term tepal is appropriate include genera such as Aloe and Tulipa. In contrast, genera such as Rosa and Phaseolus have well-distinguished sepals and petals.

The number of sepals in a flower is its merosity. Flower merosity is indicative of a plant's classification. The merosity of a eudicot flower is typically four or five. The merosity of a monocot or palaeodicot flower is three, or a multiple of three.

The development and form of the sepals vary considerably among flowering plants. They may be free (polysepalous) or fused together (gamosepalous). Often, the sepals are much reduced, appearing somewhat awn-like, or as scales, teeth, or ridges. Most often such structures protrude until the fruit is mature and falls off.

Examples of flowers with much-reduced perianths are found among the grasses.

In some flowers, the sepals are fused towards the base, forming a calyx tube (as in the families Lythraceae and Fabaceae). In other families (e.g. Rosaceae and Myrtaceae), a hypanthium includes the bases of sepals, petals, and the attachment points of the stamens.

Mechanical cues may be responsible for sepal growth and there is a strong evidence suggesting that microtubules are present and determine the tensile strength and direction of growth at a molecular level.

=== Morphology ===
Morphologically, both sepals and petals are modified leaves. The calyx (the sepals) and the corolla (the petals) are the outer sterile whorls of the flower, which together form the perianth. In some plants, such as Aristolochia, the calyx is the primary whorl, forming a flower up to 50 cm (20 in) wide, with one sepal growing to a slender ribbon with a length of up to 4 m (13 ft) in Aristolochia grandiflora, the largest of all calyces.

== Function ==
Sepals typically function as protection for the flower in bud, and often as support for the petals when in bloom.

Similarly to ordinary leaves, sepals are capable of performing photosynthesis. However, photosynthesis in sepals occurs at a slower rate than in ordinary leaves due to sepals having a lower stomatal density which limits the spaces for gas exchange.

After flowering, most plants have no more use for the calyx, which withers or becomes vestigial, although in a few plants such as Lodoicea and Solanum melongena (aubergine, brinjal) the calyx grows along with the fruit, possibly to protect the attachment point. Some plants retain a thorny calyx, either dried or live, as protection for the fruit or seeds. Examples include species of Acaena, some of the Solanaceae (for example the tomatillo Physalis philadelphica), and the water caltrop, Trapa natans. In some species, the calyx not only persists after flowering but instead of withering, begins to grow until it forms a bladder-like enclosure around the fruit. This is an effective protection against some kinds of birds and insects, for example in Hibiscus trionum and in Physalis species. In some other plants, the calyx grows into an accessory fruit.
