= Syzygium legatii =

Conservation status
- Least Concern (IUCN 3.1)

Scientific classification
- Kingdom: Plantae
- Clade: Tracheophytes
- Clade: Angiosperms
- Clade: Eudicots
- Clade: Rosids
- Order: Myrtales
- Family: Myrtaceae
- Genus: Syzygium
- Species: S. legatii

Binomial name
- Syzygium legatii Burtt Davy & Greenway

Synonyms
- Syzygium guineense subsp. legatii (Burtt Davy & Greenway) F.White

Species of plant in the myrtle family

Syzygium legatii, the mountain waterberry, is a species of flowering plant in the family Myrtaceae, native to the Northern Provinces of South Africa. A small tree, it is typically found in rocky grasslands and savannas, often on quartzite soils.
