= Galpinia =

Scientific classification
- Kingdom: Plantae
- Clade: Tracheophytes
- Clade: Angiosperms
- Clade: Eudicots
- Clade: Rosids
- Order: Myrtales
- Family: Lythraceae
- Genus: Galpinia; N.E.Br.
- Species: G. transvaalica

Binomial name
- Galpinia transvaalica N.E.Br.

Synonyms
- Galpinia parviflora H.M.L.Forbes

Genus of flowering plants

Galpinia is a monotypic genus of flowering plants belonging to the family Lythraceae. The only species is Galpinia transvaalica.

Its native range is tropical and Southern Africa. It is found in KwaZulu-Natal and Northern Provinces (Provinces of South Africa), Mozambique, Eswatini and Zimbabwe.

The genus name of Galpinia is in honour of Ernest Edward Galpin (1858–1941), a South African botanist and banker, and the specific epithet of transvaalica refers to Transvaal (an historic region of South Africa). The plant was first described and published in Bull. Misc. Inform. Kew 1894 on page 345 in 1894.
