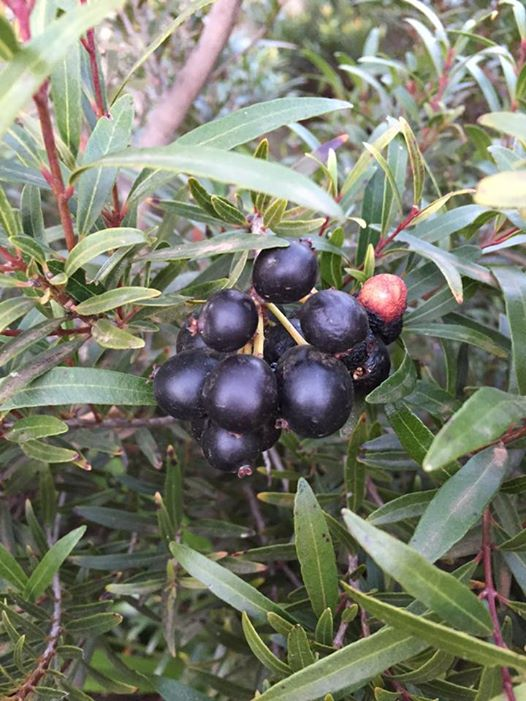

Conservation status
- Least Concern (IUCN 3.1)

Scientific classification
- Kingdom: Plantae
- Clade: Tracheophytes
- Clade: Angiosperms
- Clade: Eudicots
- Clade: Rosids
- Order: Myrtales
- Family: Myrtaceae
- Genus: Syzygium
- Species: S. pondoense

Binomial name
- Syzygium pondoense Engl.

= Syzygium pondoense =

Species of flowering plant

Syzygium pondoense is a species of flowering plant in the family Myrtaceae. It is a shrub or tree endemic to the Cape Provinces and KwaZulu Natal in South Africa. It is threatened by habitat loss.

== Gallery ==
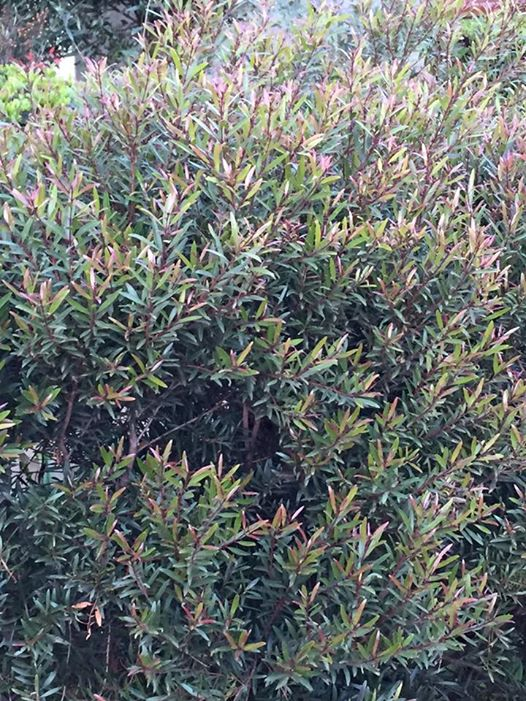

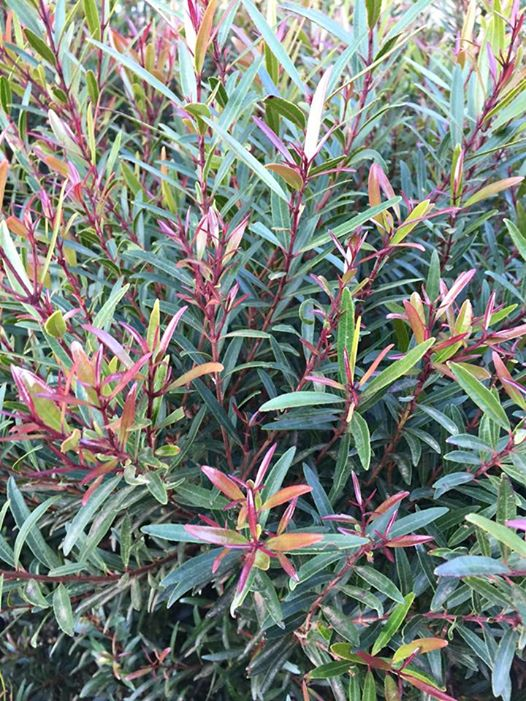
