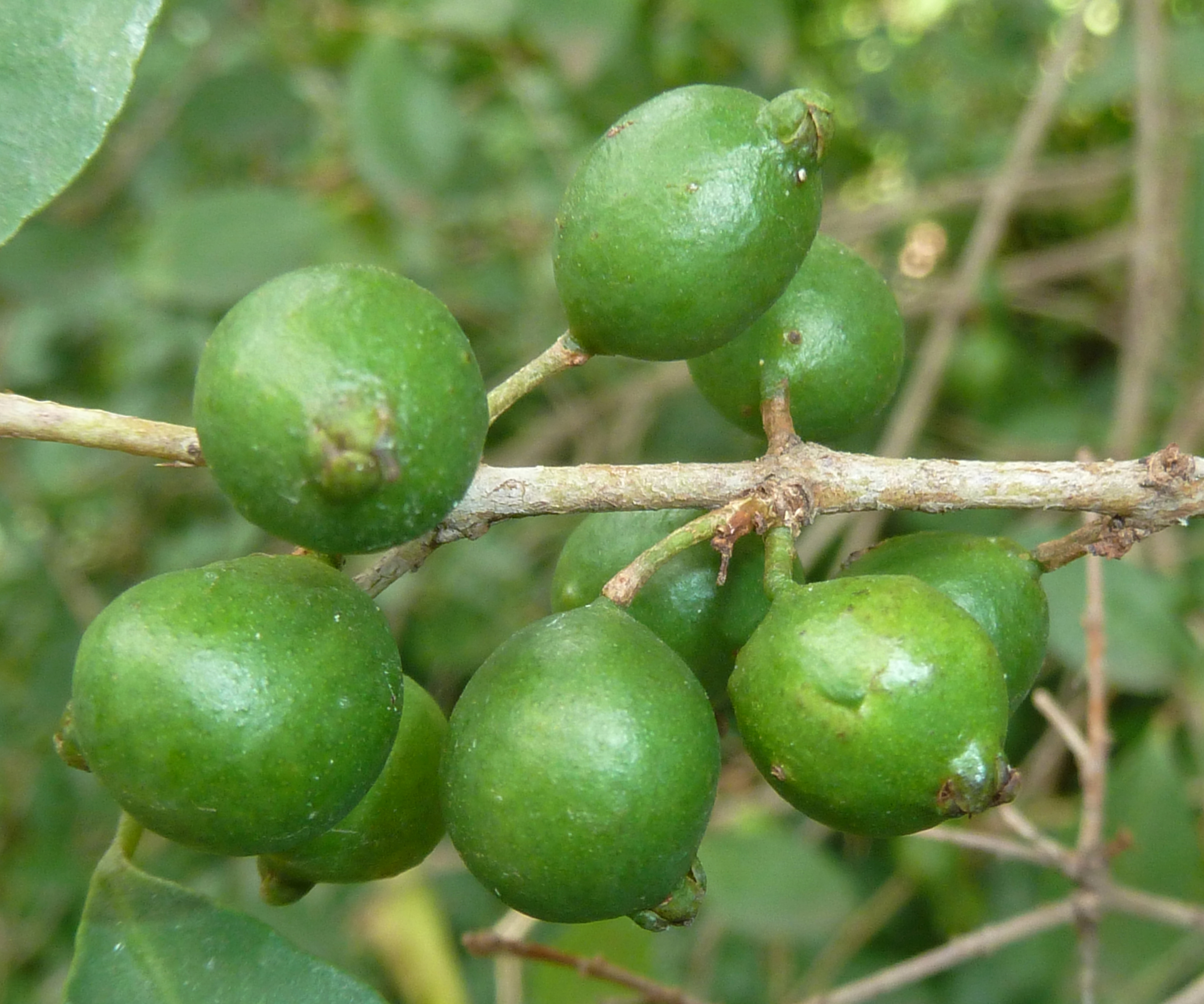
- Fruit

Scientific classification
- Kingdom: Plantae
- Clade: Tracheophytes
- Clade: Angiosperms
- Clade: Eudicots
- Clade: Rosids
- Order: Myrtales
- Family: Myrtaceae
- Genus: Eugenia
- Species: E. capensis

Binomial name
- Eugenia capensis (Eckl. & Zeyh.) Harv.

Subspecies
- 7; see text

Synonyms
- List: Memecylon capense Eckl. & Zeyh.; Myrtus capensis (Eckl. & Zeyh.) Harv., nom. illeg. homonym. post. synonyms of subsp. albanensis: Eugenia albanensis Sond. synonyms of subsp. capensis: Eugenia capensis var. major Sond.; Myrtus major Kuntze, nom. illeg. homonym. post. synonyms of subsp. gueinzii: Eugenia gueinzii Sond. synonyms of subsp. natalitia: Eugenia natalitia Sond.; Eugenia rudatisii Engl. & Brehmer synonyms of subsp. nyassensis: Eugenia chirindensis Baker f.; Eugenia nyassensis Engl.; Myrtus nyassensis (Engl.) Kuntze; Eugenia simii Dummer synonyms of subsp. zeyheri: Eugenia zeyheri (Harv.) Harv.; Myrtus zeyheri Harv.

= Eugenia capensis =

Dune myrtle

Species of flowering plant

Eugenia capensis, the dune myrtle, is a species of plant in the family Myrtaceae, which is native to East and southern Africa.

== Subspecies ==
Seven subspecies are accepted:

- E. capensis subsp. albanensis (Sond.) F.White
- E. capensis subsp. capensis
- E. capensis subsp. gueinzii (Sond.) F.White
- E. capensis subsp. natalitia (Sond.) F.White
- E. capensis subsp. nyassensis (Engl.) F.White
- E. capensis subsp. simii (Dummer) F.White
- E. capensis subsp. zeyheri (Harv.) F.White
