= Syzygium gerrardi =

Conservation status
- Least Concern (IUCN 3.1)

Scientific classification
- Kingdom: Plantae
- Clade: Tracheophytes
- Clade: Angiosperms
- Clade: Eudicots
- Clade: Rosids
- Order: Myrtales
- Family: Myrtaceae
- Genus: Syzygium
- Species: S. gerrardi

Binomial name
- Syzygium gerrardi (Harv. ex Hook.f.) Hochst. ex Burtt Davy

Synonyms
- Acmena gerrardi Harv. ex Hook.f.; Eugenia gerrardi (Harv. ex Hook.f.) Sim; Syzygium guineense subsp. gerrardi (Harv. ex Hook.f.) F.White

Species of flowering plant

Syzygium gerrardi, commonly known as forest waterberry, is a species of plant in the family Myrtaceae. It is a tree native to Eswatini and the South African provinces of Eastern Cape, KwaZulu-Natal, Limpopo, and Mpumalanga, where it grows in lowland and montane subtropical moist forests.
