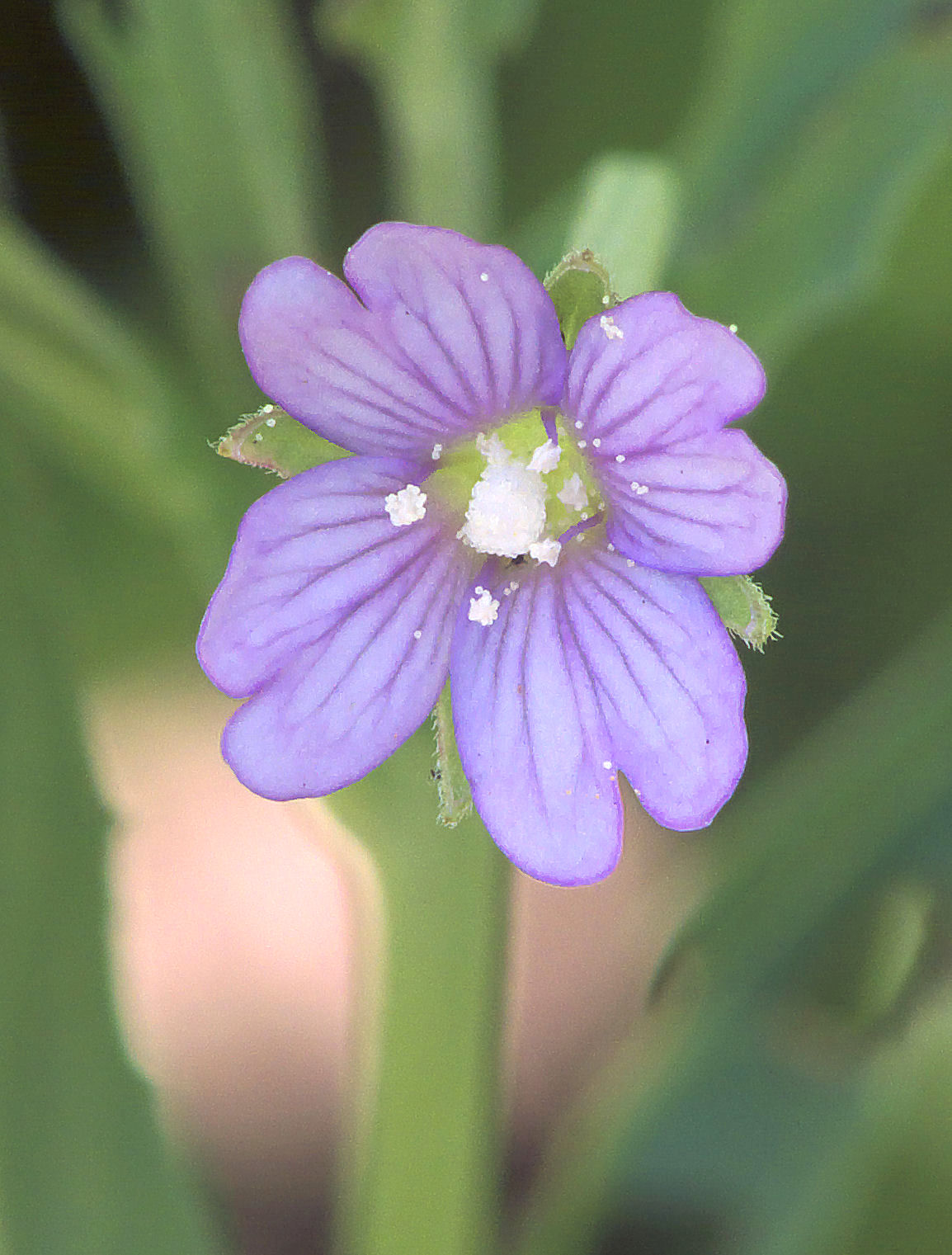
- Flower
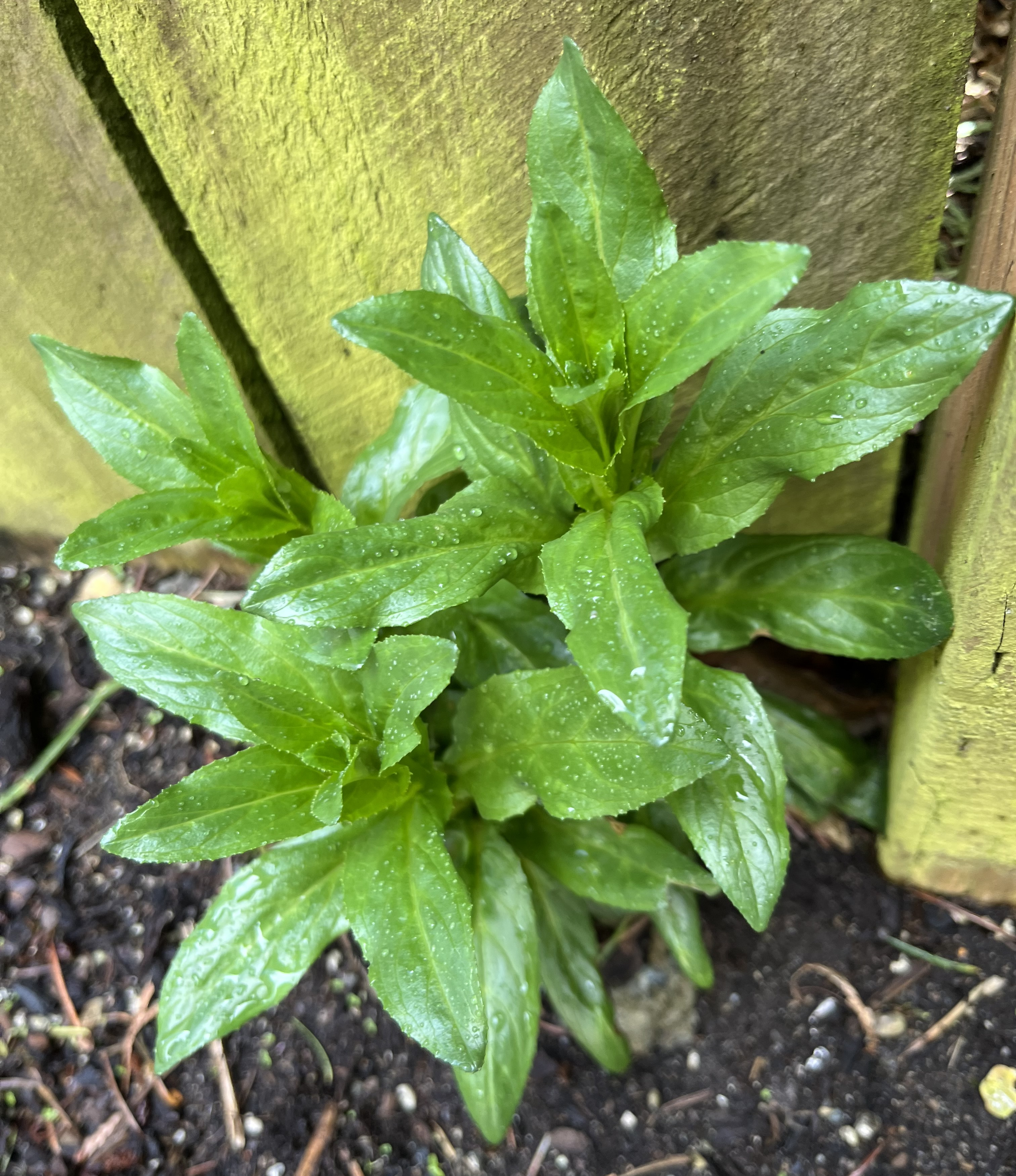
- Habit

Scientific classification
- Kingdom: Plantae
- Clade: Tracheophytes
- Clade: Angiosperms
- Clade: Eudicots
- Clade: Rosids
- Order: Myrtales
- Family: Onagraceae
- Genus: Epilobium
- Species: E. tetragonum

Binomial name
- Epilobium tetragonum L.

= Epilobium tetragonum =

Species of flowering plant

Epilobium tetragonum, commonly known as the square stalked willow herb, is a species of flowering plant in the willowherb family Onagraceae.

The erect perennial herb typically grows to a height of 0.1 to 1.3 metres (0.3 to 4.3 ft) and can have several stems. It blooms between January and November and produces pink-purple flowers.

The species has become naturalised in the Perth and Peel regions of Western Australia.

== Description ==
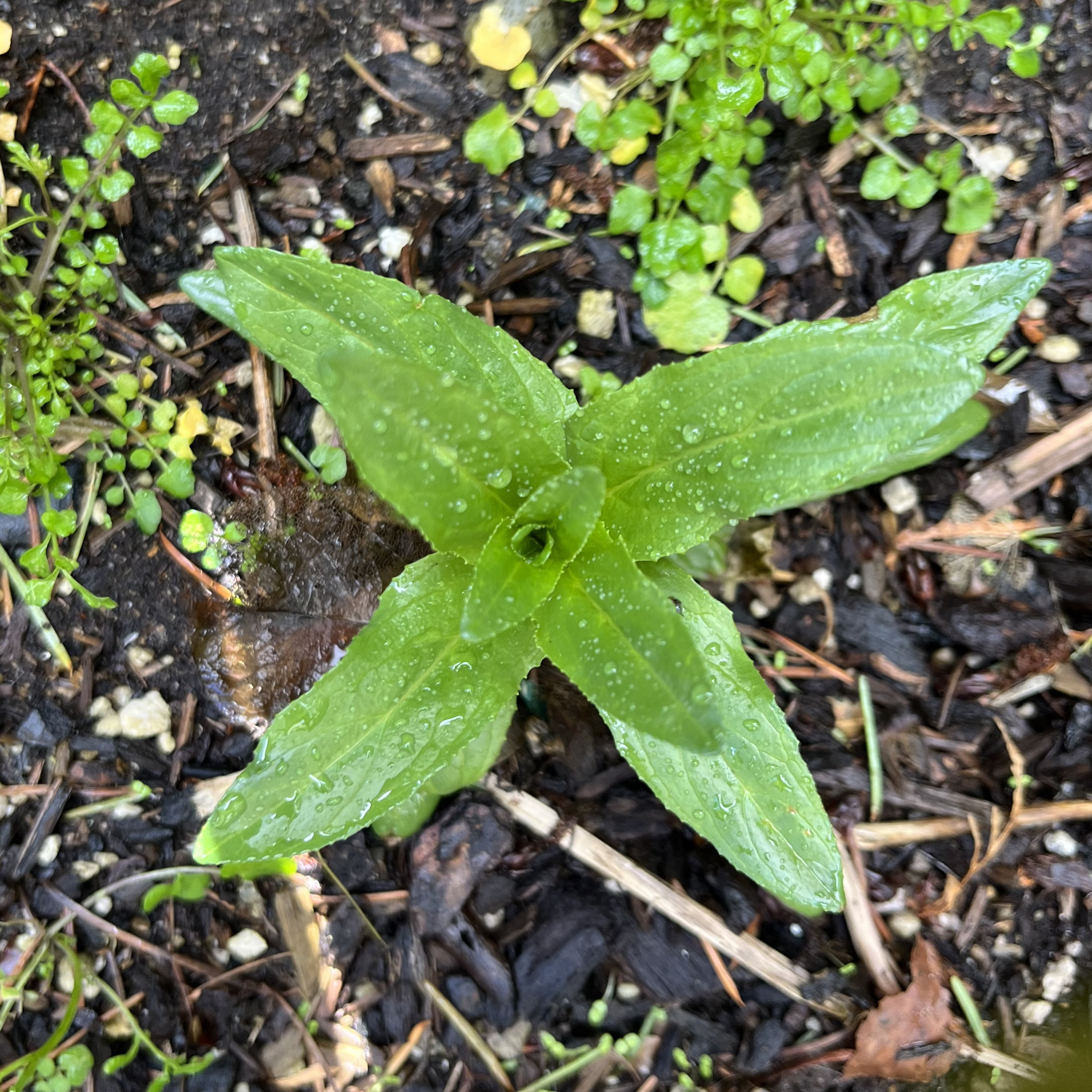
Overhead view of small E. tetragonum plant

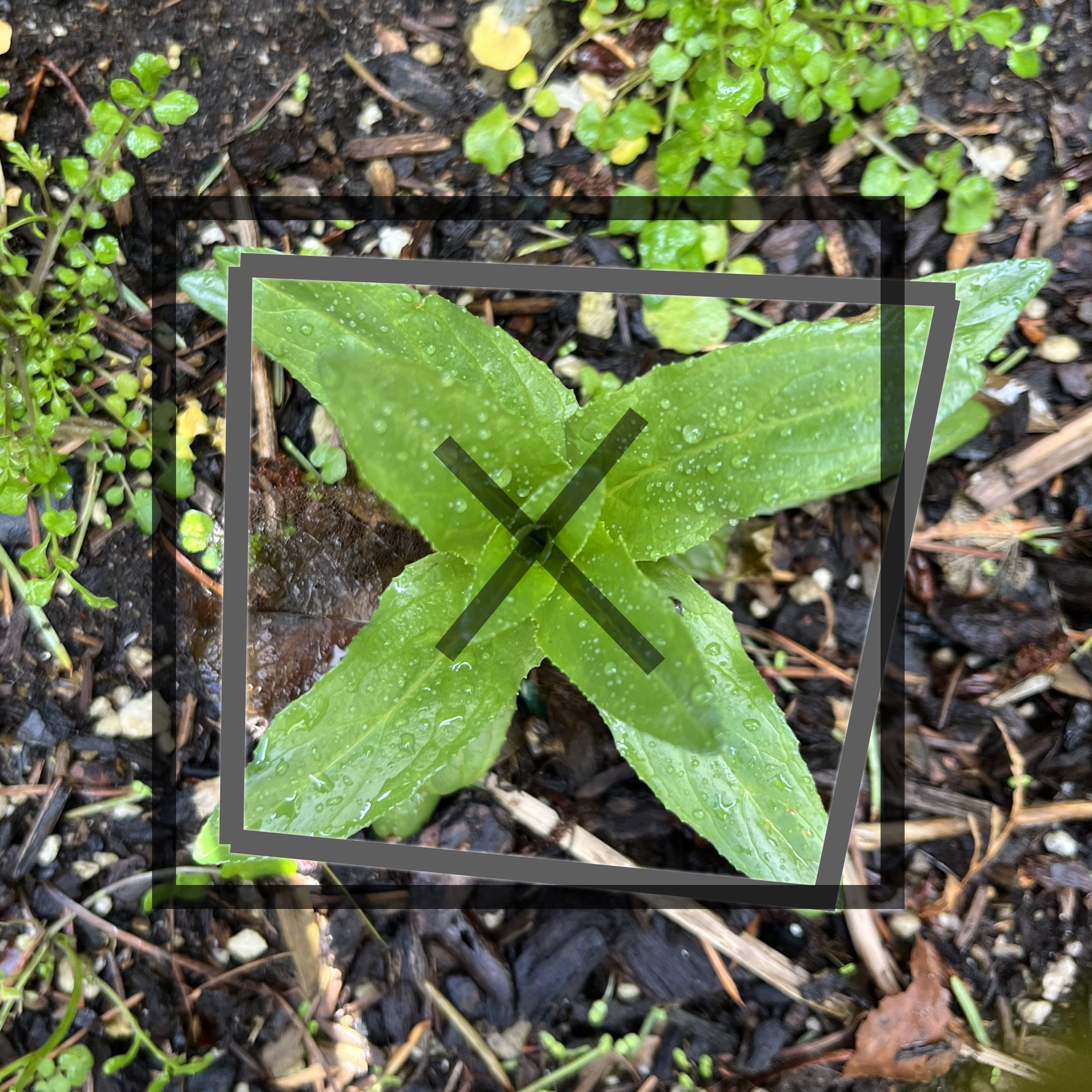
Diagram illustrating tetragonal / square arrangement of leaves

Epilobium tetragonum is characterized by its distinctive square-shaped stem, with leaves evenly spaced in a tetragonal arrangement around the stem, giving the plant a square-like appearance. The leaves are hairless and solid green and have a unique shimmer in direct sunlight.

== Bibliography ==
- Strgulc Krajšek, Sumona; Šegedin, Tamara; Jogan, Nejc (2009-06-30). "Revision of Epilobium and Chamerion in the Croatian herbaria ZA and ZAHO". Natura Croatica. 18 (1): 155–167. eISSN 1848-7386.
