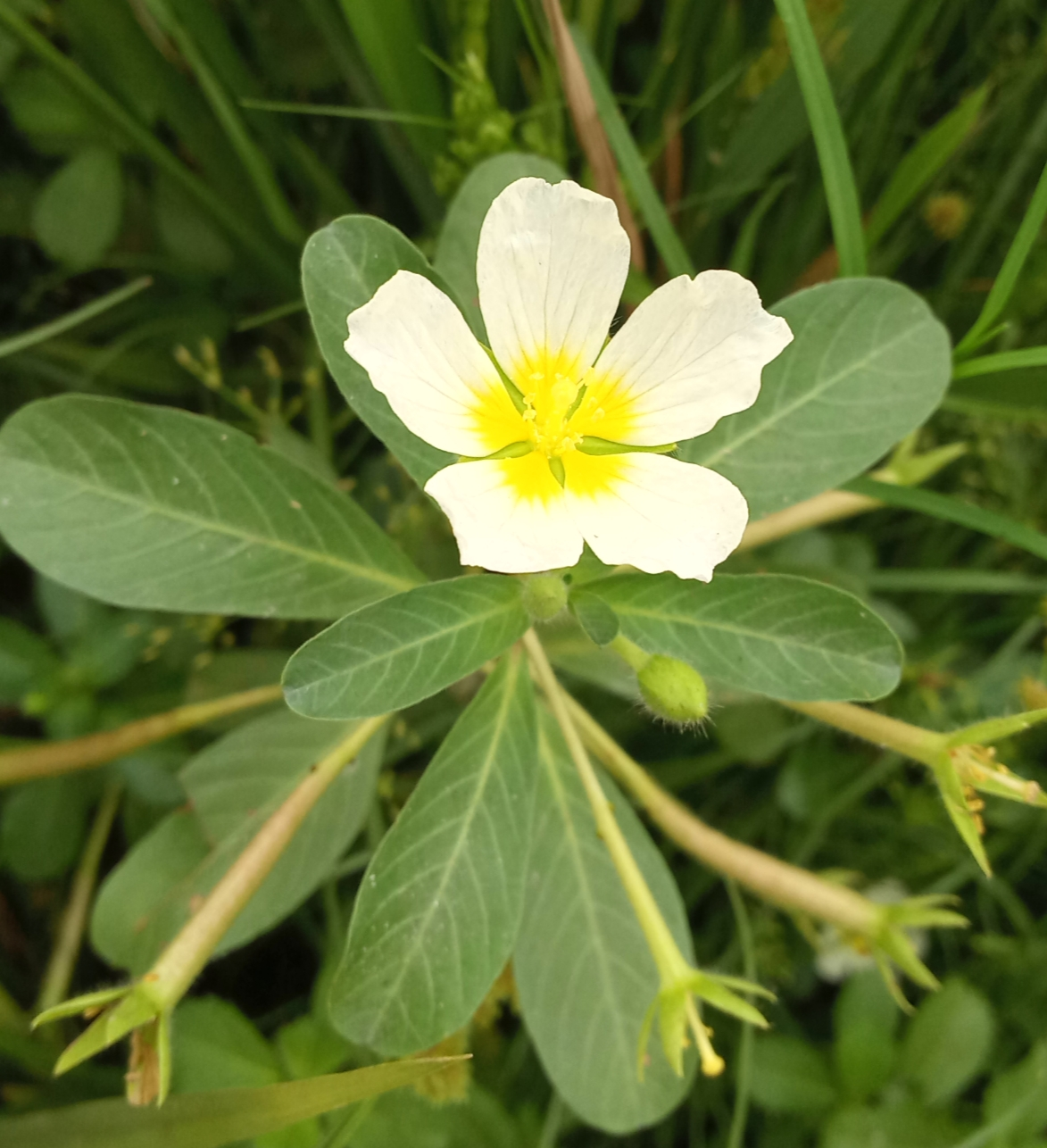

Scientific classification
- Kingdom: Plantae
- Clade: Tracheophytes
- Clade: Angiosperms
- Clade: Eudicots
- Clade: Rosids
- Order: Myrtales
- Family: Onagraceae
- Genus: Ludwigia
- Species: L. adscendens

Binomial name
- Ludwigia adscendens (L.) H.Hara

Synonyms
- Jussiaea adscendens L.; Jussiaea diffusa Forssk.; Jussiaea repens L.; Jussiaea stolonifera Guill. & Perr.; Ludwigia stolonifera (Guill. & Perr.) P.H.Raven

= Ludwigia adscendens =

Species of aquatic plant

Ludwigia adscendens, the water primrose, is a species of flowering plant in the evening primrose family. Its native distribution is unclear. It is now a common weed of rice paddies in Asia and occurs also in Australia and Africa, but may have originated in South America.

This plant is a perennial floating herb with white spongy buoys, and can float on water surface as well as creep over the surface of wetlands. The plant has simple leaves with elliptic blades, which are 0.4–7 cm long and 0.7–3 cm wide. Its petioles are 0.5–1.0 cm short. Its cream flowers emerge singly at axils, and each have 5 sepals, 5 petals, and 10 stamens.

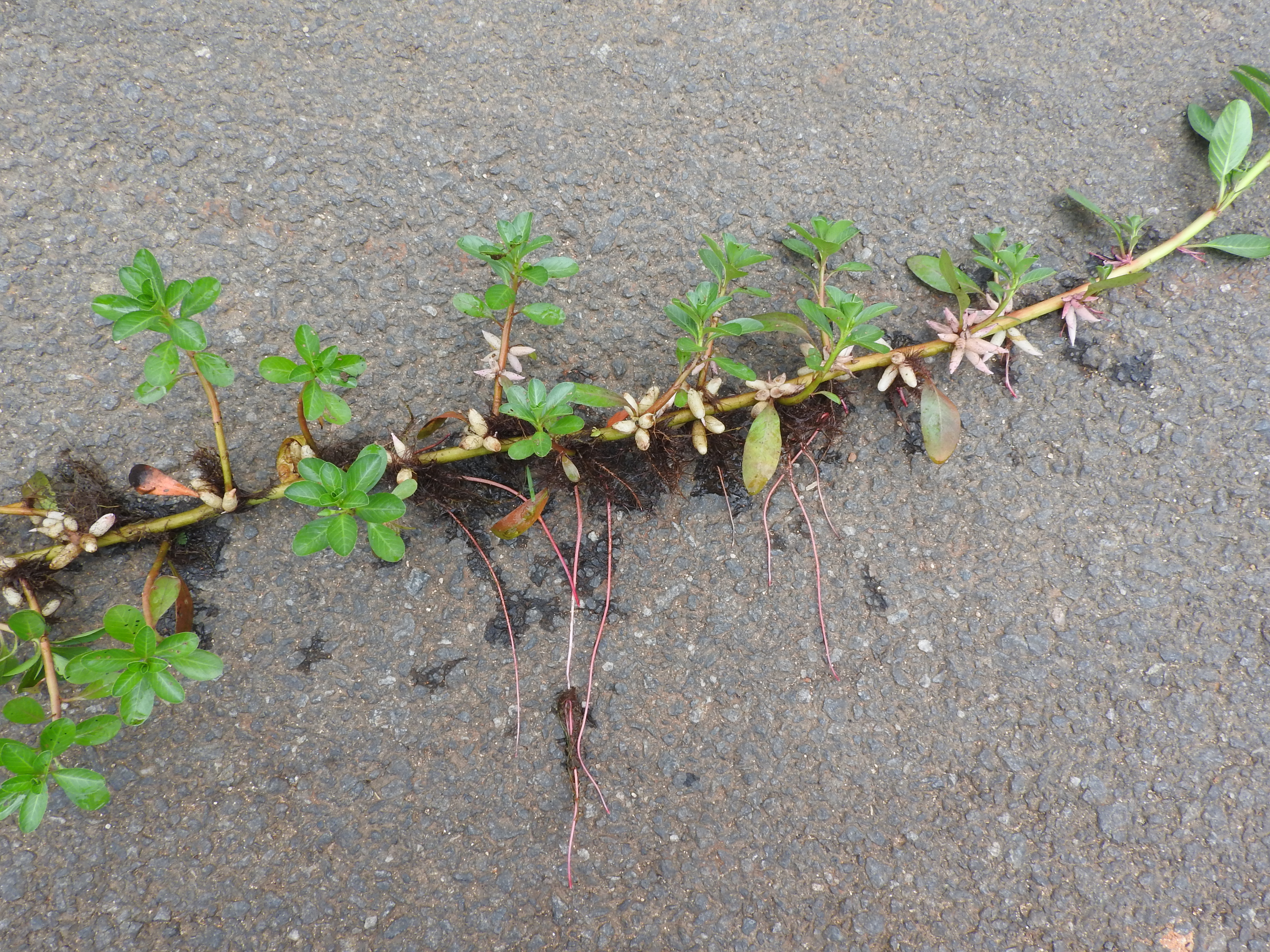

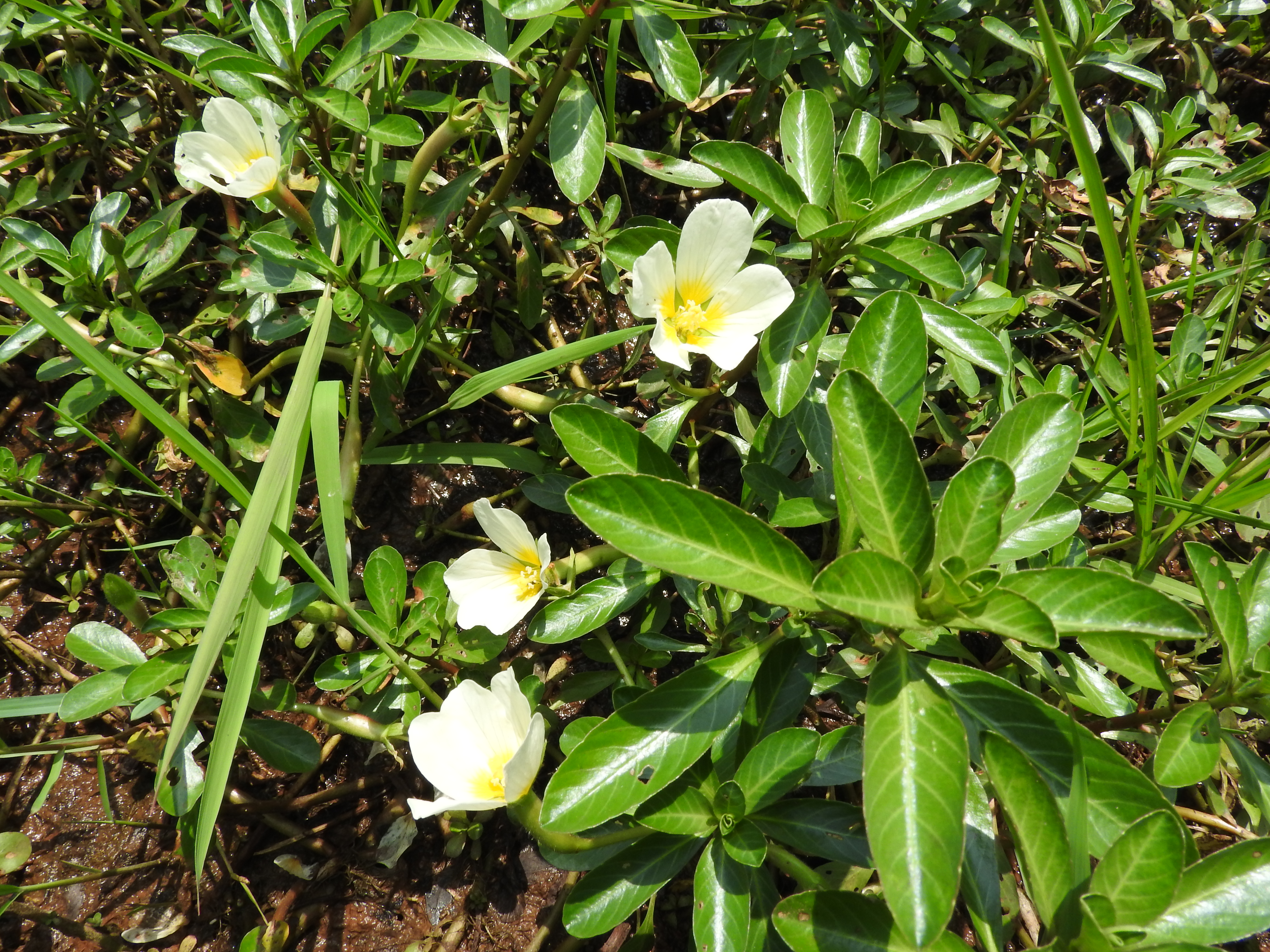
