= Georges Louis Marie Dumont de Courset =

French botanist and agronomist (1746–1824)

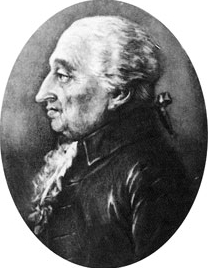
Georges Louis Marie Dumont de Courset.

Georges Louis Marie Dumont de Courset (16 September 1746 – 3 September 1824) was a French botanist and agronomist. Born near Boulogne, he studied in Paris and showed an aptitude for music and drawing.

He joined the military when he was 17 and became a second lieutenant. Sent to the south of France, he visited the Pyrenees and caught a passion for botany. He gave up his military career and returned home to build an extensive garden that became famous for the diversity of plant species. The garden was a noteworthy example of cultivation without a natural water spring source

He tried to influence the agricultural techniques employed in his area. Protected by scientists like André Thouin (1746–1824) during the Revolution, he became corresponding member of the French Academy of Agriculture.

He published five volumes on the Botaniste cultivateur, ou description, culture et usage de la plus grande partie des plantes étrangères, naturalisées et indigènes, naturalisées et indigènes, cultivées en France et en Angleterre, rangées suivant la méthode de Jussieu in 1802. Later he entirely re-examined the work and re-issued it in six volumes (1811). In these volumes, Dumont de Courset described 8,700 species and indicated their characteristics and their cultivation.

== Publications ==
- Mémoires sur l'agriculture du Boulonnois et des cantons maritimes voisins (in French). Vol. 8 voll. Boulogne: François Dolet (typographer). 1784. Archived from the original on June 9, 2019.
- Le Botaniste cultivateur, ou description, culture et usage de la plus grande partie des plantes étrangères, naturalisées et indigènes, cultivées en France et en Angleterre, rangées suivant la méthode de Jussieu (in French). Vol. 5 voll. Paris: Arthus Bertrand (typographer). 1802–1805. Archived from the original on June 9, 2019 – via gallica.bnf.fr.
- Le botaniste cultivateur, ou description culture et usage de la plus grande partie des plantes rangées suivant la méthode de Jussieu (in French). Vol. 7 voll. (2nd ed.). Paris: Déterville et Goujon. 1811–1814.
