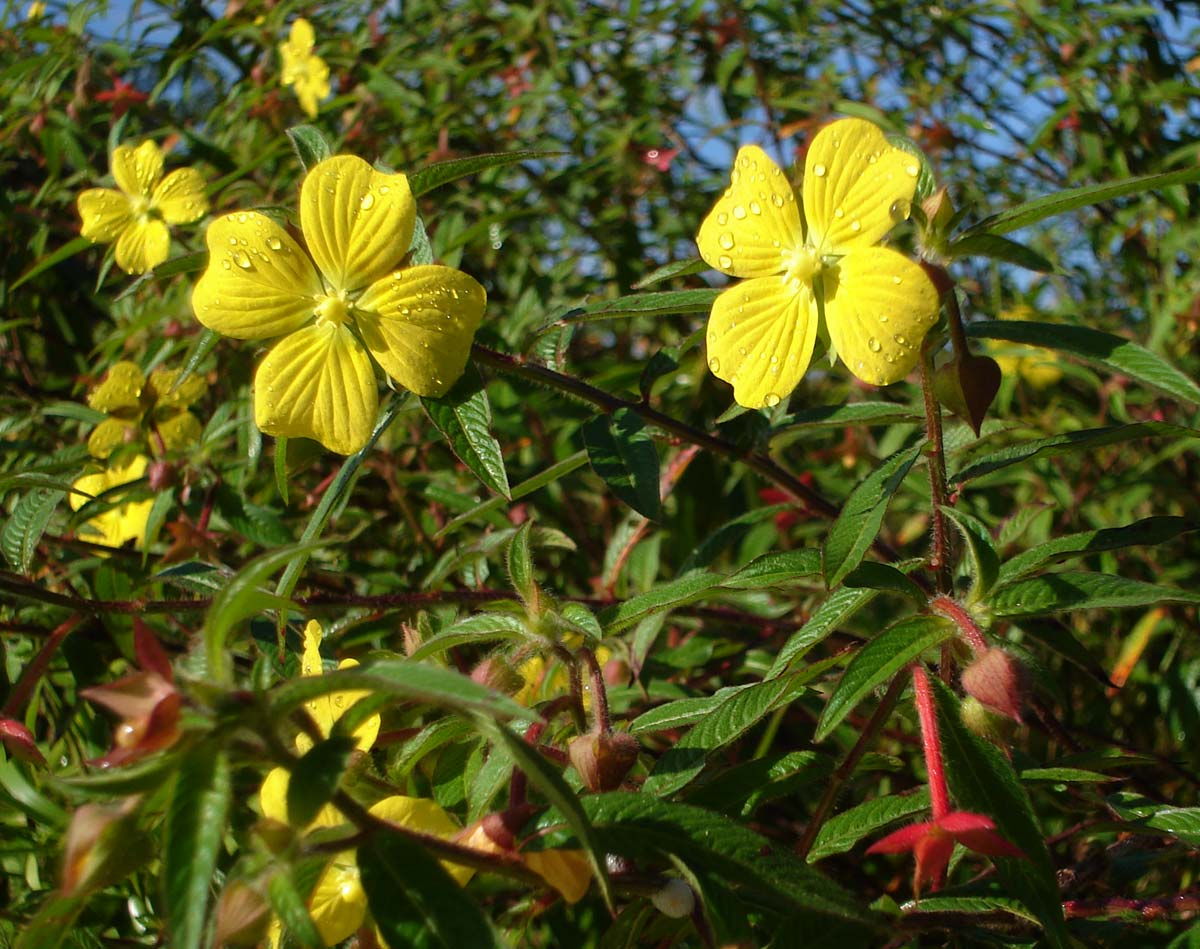

Conservation status
- Least Concern (IUCN 3.1)

Scientific classification
- Kingdom: Plantae
- Clade: Tracheophytes
- Clade: Angiosperms
- Clade: Eudicots
- Clade: Rosids
- Order: Myrtales
- Family: Onagraceae
- Genus: Ludwigia
- Species: L. octovalvis

Binomial name
- Ludwigia octovalvis (Jacq.) P.H.Raven

= Ludwigia octovalvis =

Species of plant

Ludwigia octovalvis is a species of flowering plant in the Onagraceae family known by the common name Mexican primrose-willow. Its native distribution is unclear, but can be found in Central America, Australia, South-East Asia, Tamilnadu (IND), the Middle East, the Central-West African regions and spreads easily to become naturalized. It is also cultivated as an aquatic plant. The plant is known for its anti-aging properties. The species is sometimes regarded as an invasive species and is classified by IUCN as of "least concern" with stable populations. An adult plant is one meter tall on average but is able to grow taller. It spreads to form mats on the mud, rooting at nodes in contact with the substrate, or floats ascending in the water. Its flowers are yellow in appearance. They are made up of green and red stems. They yield small capsular fruits containing many minute seeds.

== Gallery ==
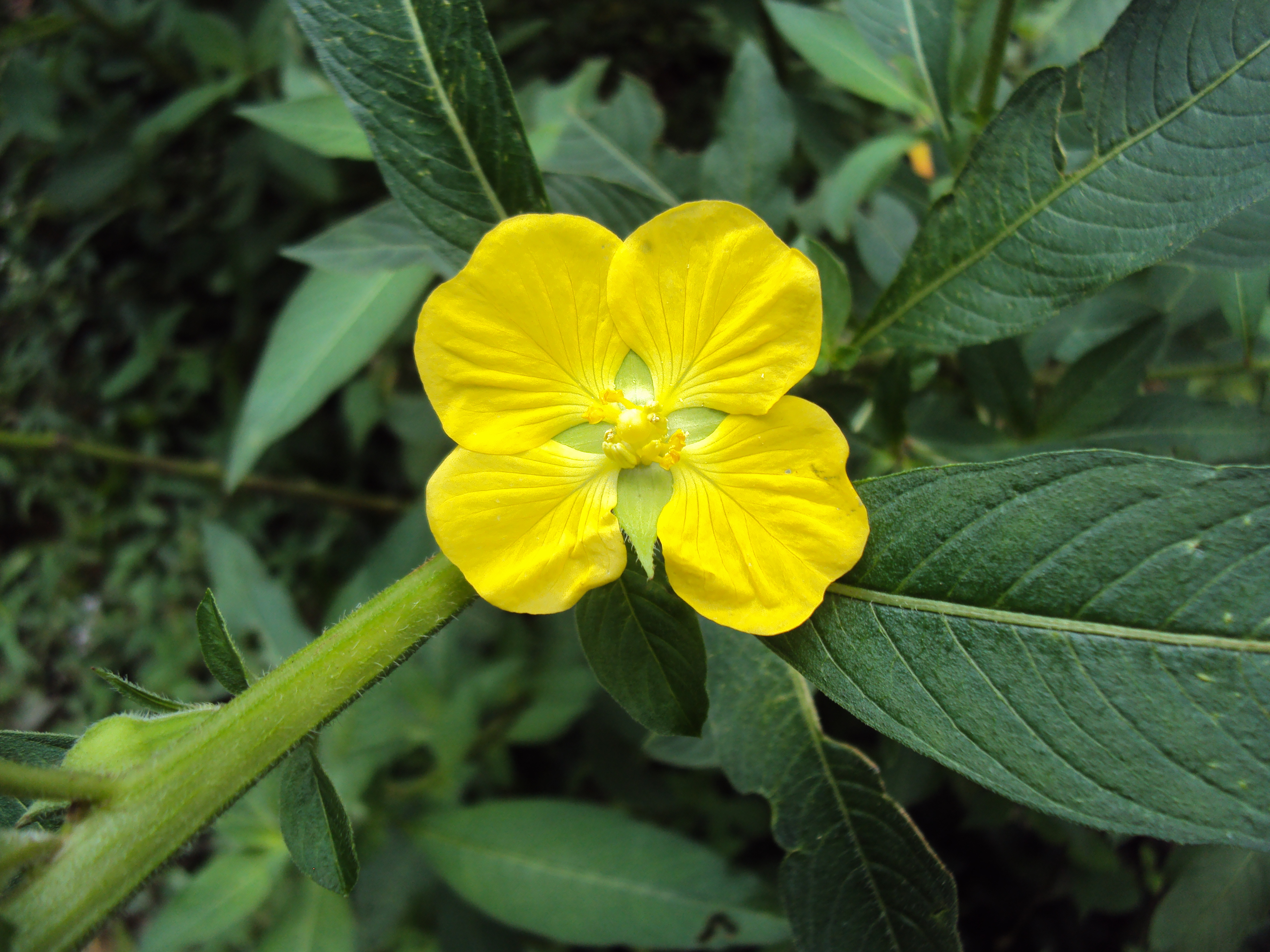

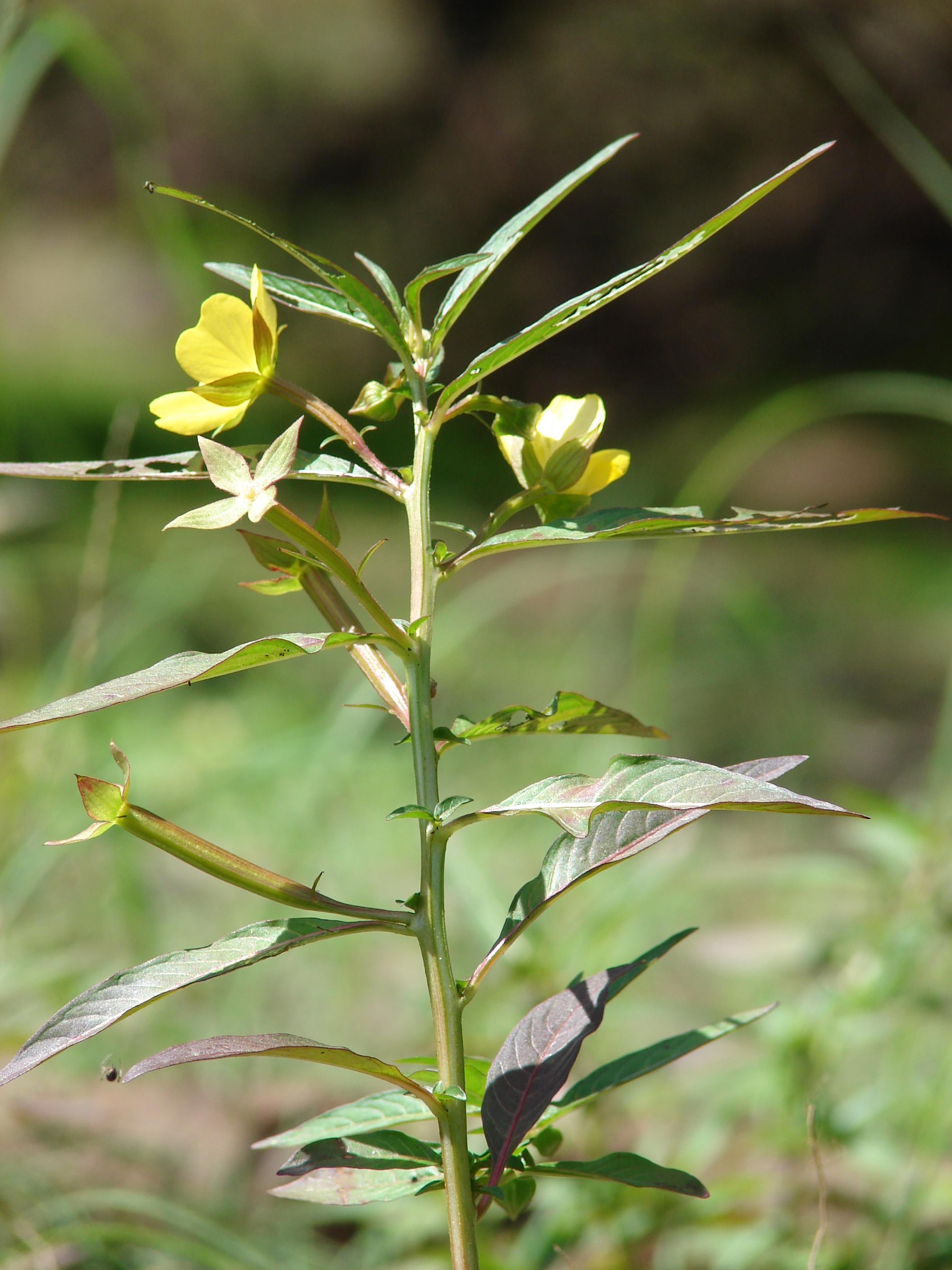

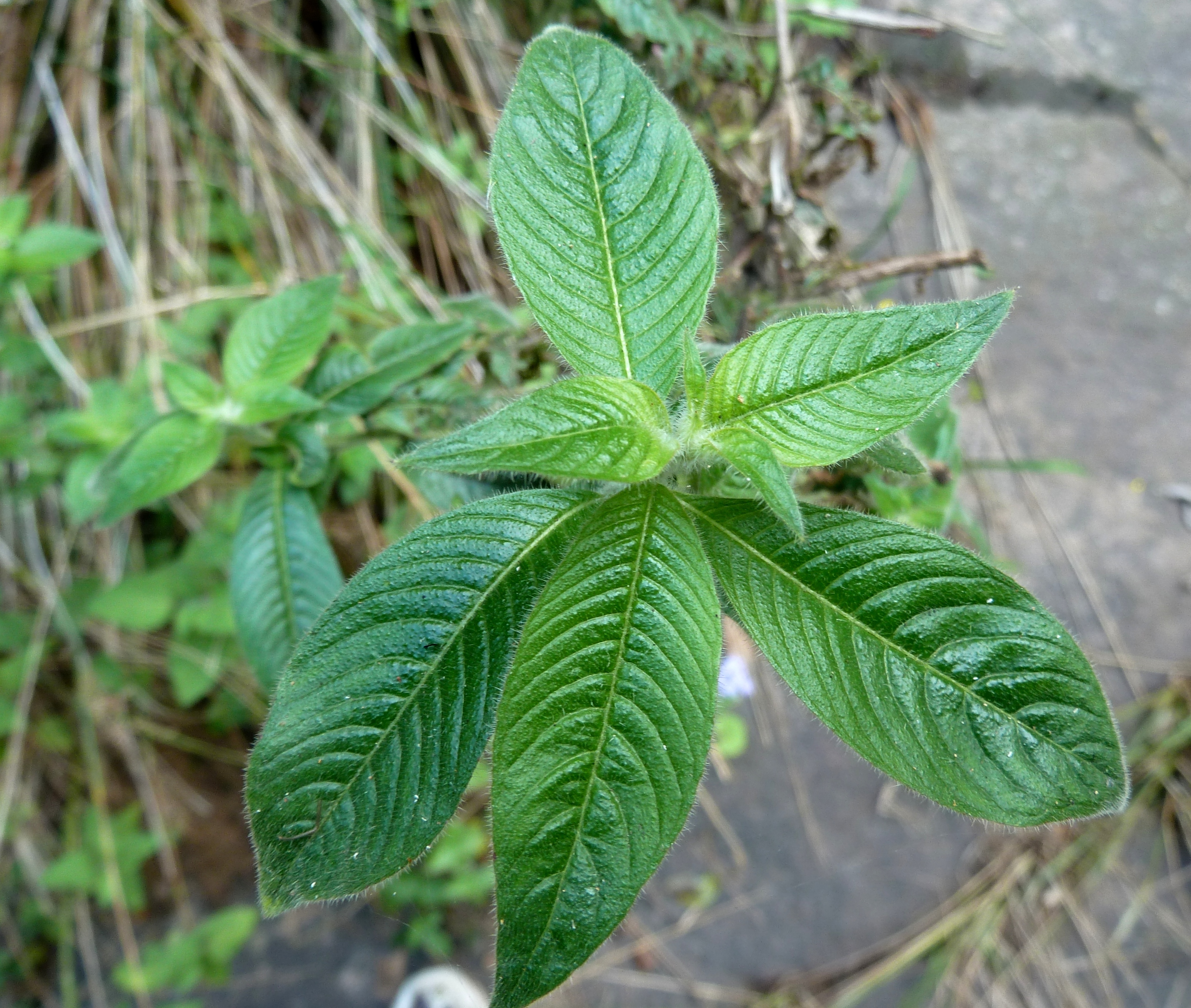

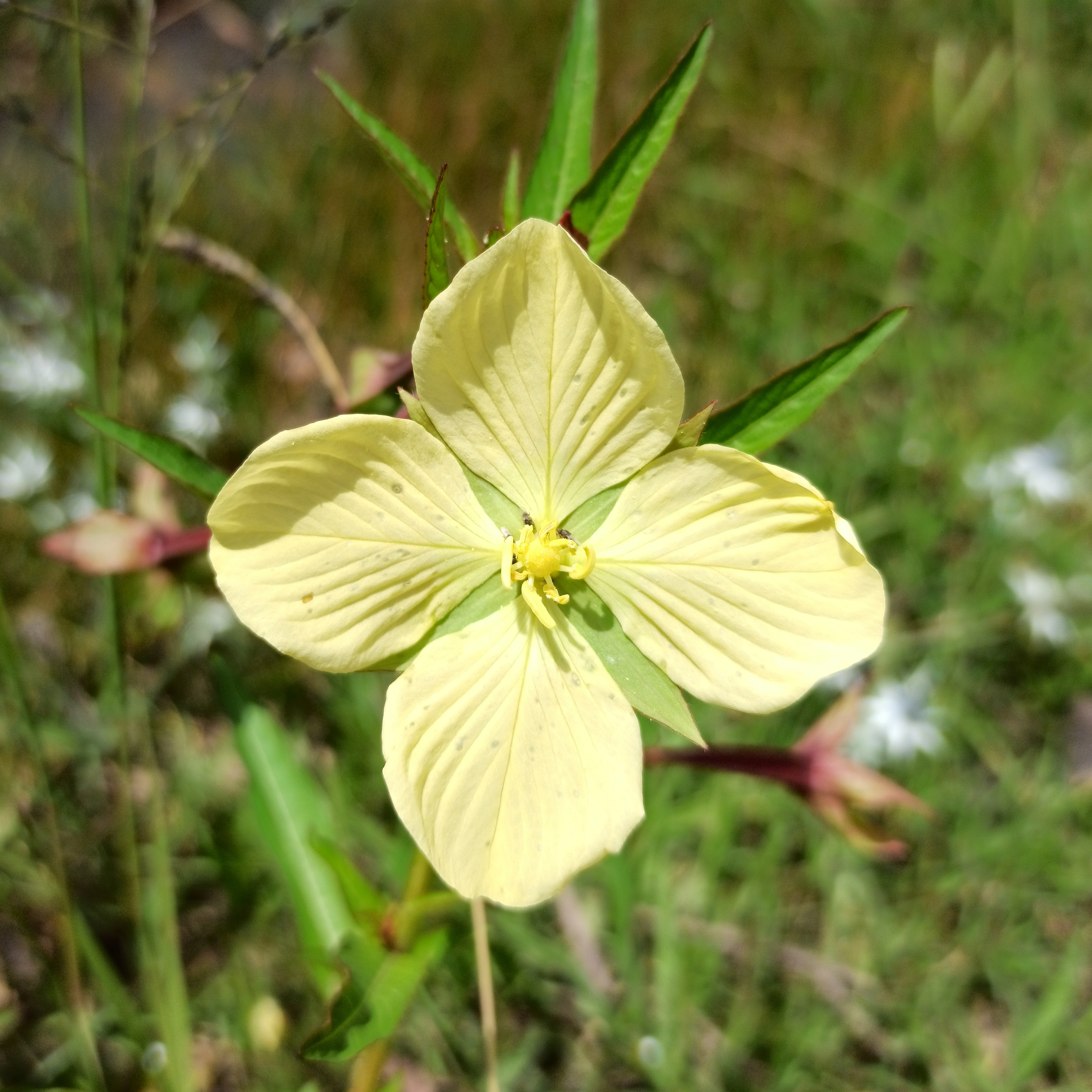

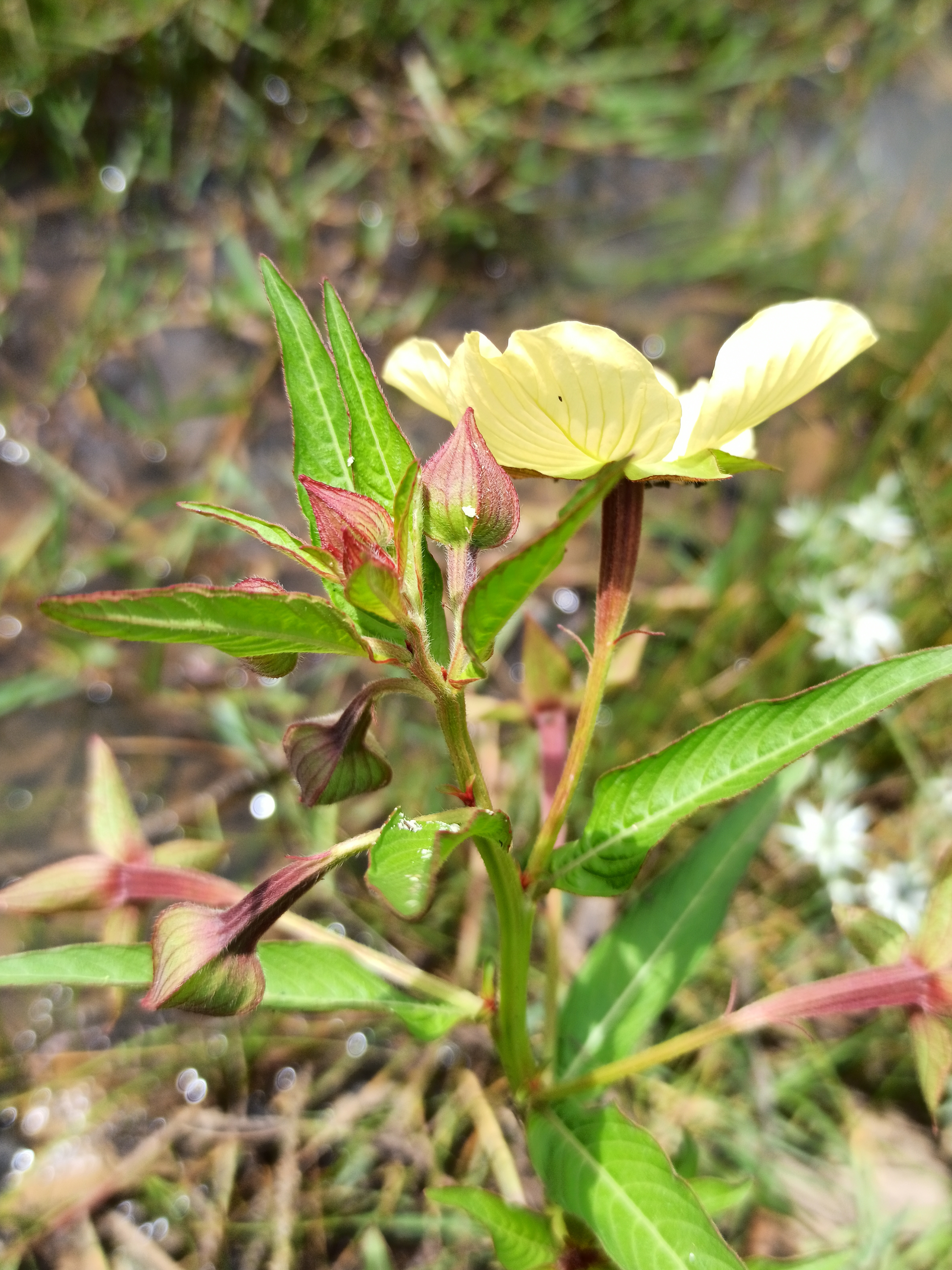
