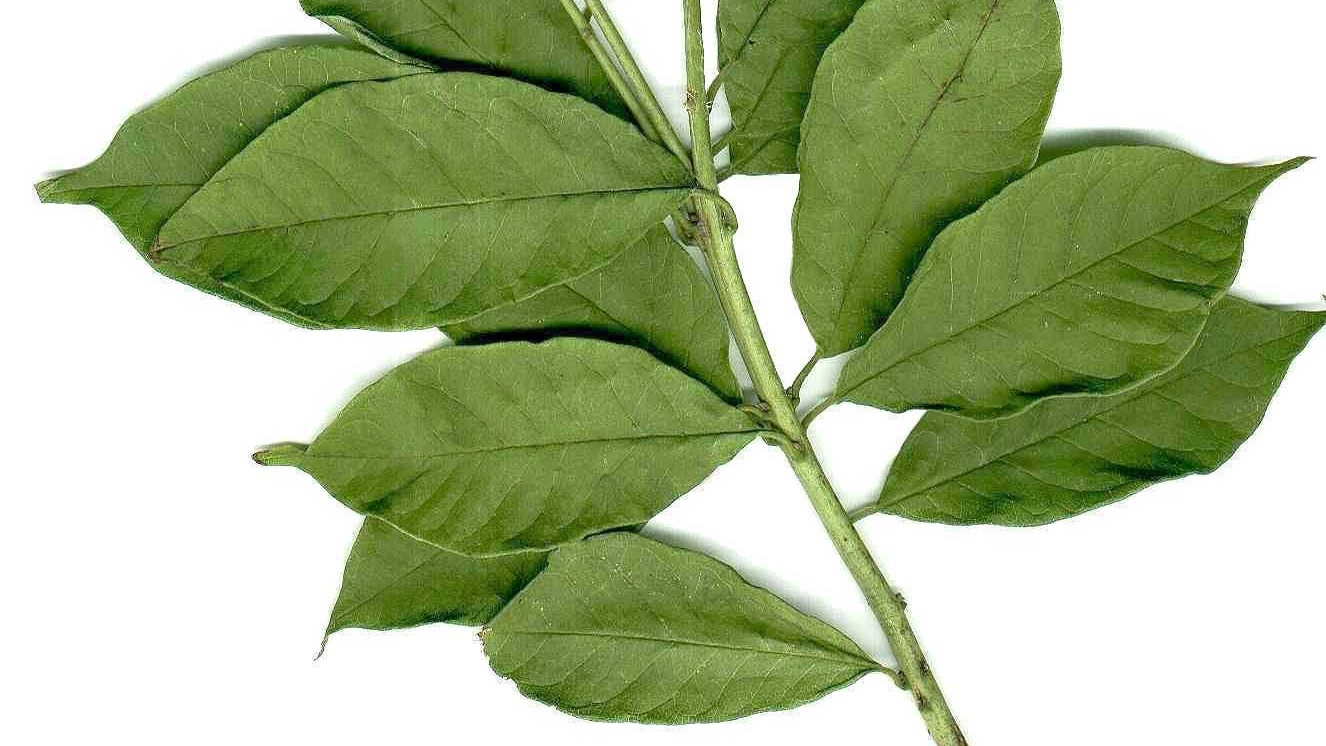
- C. padoides, foliage detail

Conservation status
- Least Concern (IUCN 3.1)

Scientific classification
- Kingdom: Plantae
- Clade: Tracheophytes
- Clade: Angiosperms
- Clade: Eudicots
- Clade: Rosids
- Order: Myrtales
- Family: Combretaceae
- Genus: Combretum
- Species: C. padoides

Binomial name
- Combretum padoides Engl. & Diels

Synonyms
- Combretum giorgii De Wild. & Exell; Combretum homblei De Wild.; Combretum minutiflorum Exell; Combretum tenuipes Engl. & Diels

= Combretum padoides =

Thicket bushwillow

Species of flowering plant

Combretum padoides, the thicket bushwillow, occurs in the lowlands of tropical and south-eastern Africa. They grow in a range of habitats from muddy riverbanks to dry rocky hillsides. The mostly opposite oval leaves are carried on long slender branches. The trees or shrubs flower in profusion in mid-summer and the 4-winged fruits reach maturity from late summer to mid winter.

Mature plants, though large, don't assume a true tree shape as their drooping branches are adapted to merge or intertwine with surrounding grass and shrubs for support. Combretums with a comparable growth habit are C. celastroides (Jesse), C. edwardsii, C. mossambicense, and C. paniculatum.
