= Strephonema pseudocola =

Conservation status
- Least Concern (IUCN 3.1)

Scientific classification
- Kingdom: Plantae
- Clade: Tracheophytes
- Clade: Angiosperms
- Clade: Eudicots
- Clade: Rosids
- Order: Myrtales
- Family: Combretaceae
- Genus: Strephonema
- Species: S. pseudocola

Binomial name
- Strephonema pseudocola A.Chev.

Synonyms
- Strephonema apolloniense Clark

Species of flowering plant

Strephonema pseudocola is a species of flowering plant in the family Combretaceae. It is a tree found in the forests of tropical West Africa. It was first described from the Ivory Coast.

== Description ==
Strephonema pseudocola is a large tree growing to a height of about 70 ft (20 m). The leaves are alternate, simple and entire, the apex drawn out into a point. The white flowers are much larger than those of other members of the genus. They are bisexual, with parts in fives, and have a pedicel. The receptacle is cup-shaped, with the ovary visible inside at the base; this means that as the fruit develops, the remains of the calyx, petals and stamens are at the base of the fruit, whereas, in other genera of the family Combretaceae, they are at the top. The succulent fruit is some 2 to 3 in (5.1 to 7.6 cm) wide and 2 in (5.1 cm) long, rough, with a sharp apex and a warty appearance; it resembles a gall, and contains a single, large seed with two cotyledons; the fruit is similar in appearance to a kola nut.

== Distribution ==
Strephonema pseudocola is native to the forests of tropical West Africa, its range extending from Sierra Leone through Guinea, Liberia, Ivory Coast and Ghana to Cameroon. It is the only species in the genus to be found west of Nigeria. It predominantly grows in wet lowland forest, but in Ghana it also grows in upland evergreen forest in the Atewa Range, along with Combretum multinervium, Neolemonniera clitandrifolia, Newtonia duparquetiana and the liana Strychnos icaja.

== Ecology ==
Strephonema pseudocola is a non-ectomycorrhizal tree, as are Cola verticillata and Oubanguia alata with which it is often associated. The leaf litter below these trees contains more N and less Mg and P, and decays faster than does the leaf litter in areas dominated by ectomycorrhizal species.
