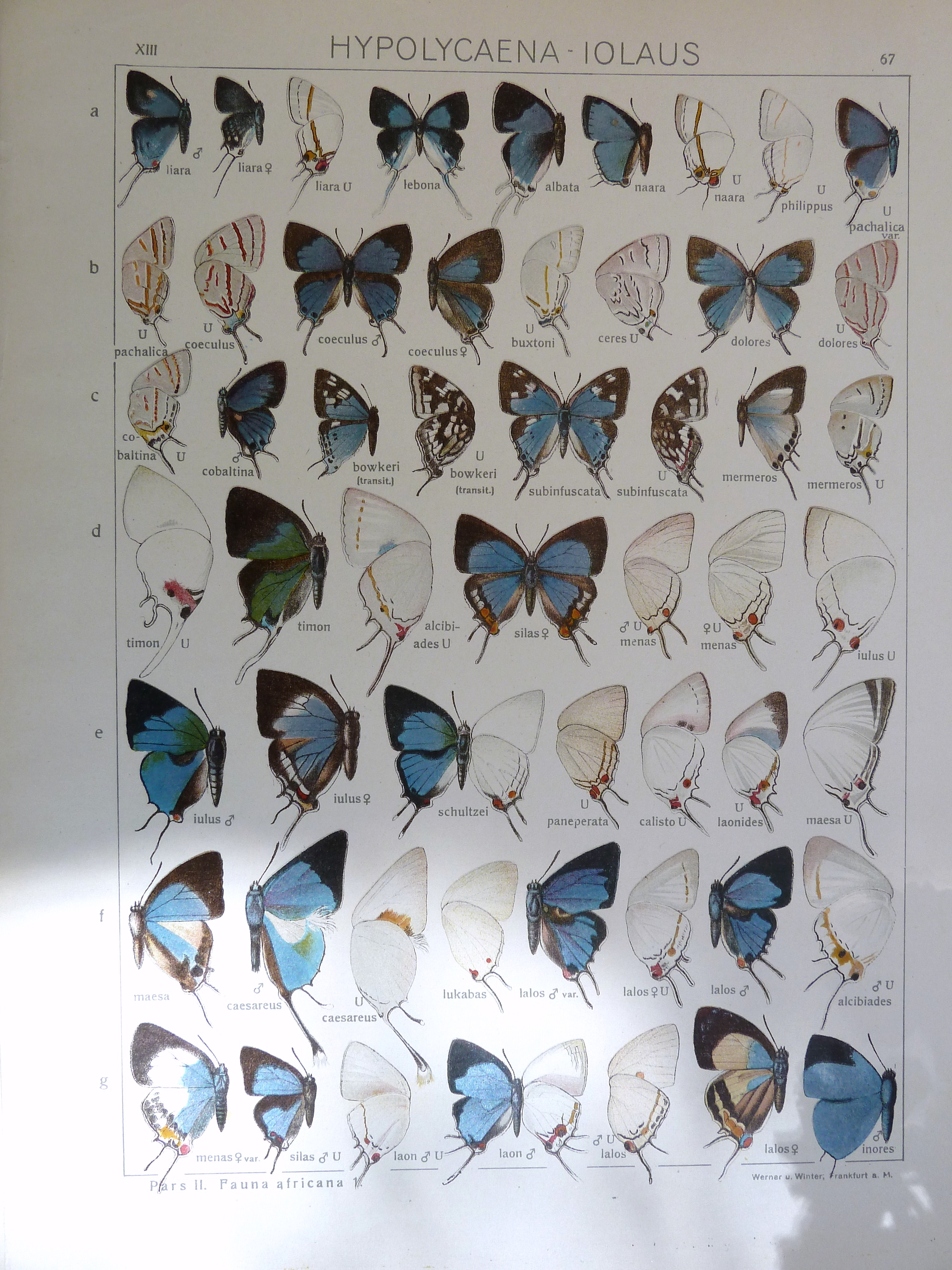
- Seitz Fauna Africana Taf67 (line b)

Scientific classification
- Kingdom: Animalia
- Phylum: Arthropoda
- Clade: Pancrustacea
- Class: Insecta
- Order: Lepidoptera
- Family: Lycaenidae
- Genus: Hypolycaena
- Species: H. pachalica

Binomial name
- Hypolycaena pachalica Butler, 1888

Synonyms
- Hypolycaena (Tatura) pachalica Butler, 1888; Hypolycaena aureolineata Bethune-Baker, 1906

= Hypolycaena pachalica =

Species of butterfly

Hypolycaena pachalica, the eastern hairstreak, is a butterfly in the family Lycaenidae. It was described by Arthur Gardiner Butler in 1888. It is found in Uganda, eastern and northern Kenya, the Democratic Republic of the Congo (Ituri, Mahagi-Port, Kivu and Semliki), Tanzania, Malawi, Zambia, south-western Saudi Arabia and Yemen. The habitat consists of savanna and open forests.

Adults are attracted to flowers and males occasionally come to damp patches.

The larvae feed on Combretum constrictum and Talinum portulacifolium.
