= C21H22N2O2 =

The molecular formula C_{21}H_{22}N_{2}O_{2} may refer to:

- Strychnine, a toxic, colorless, bitter, crystalline alkaloid used as a pesticide
- Isostrychnine
- Vinorine, an indole alkaloid isolated from Alstonia
