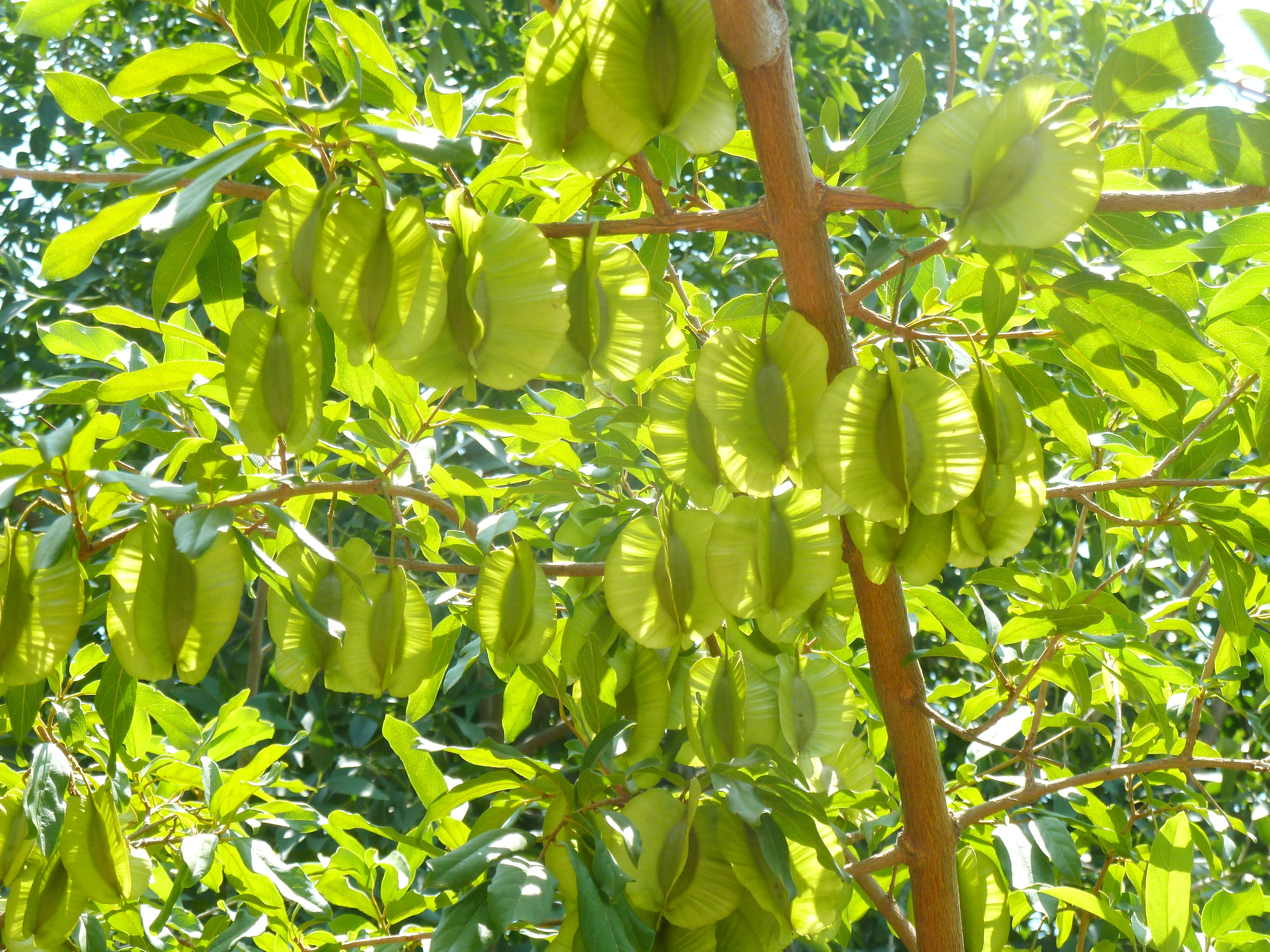

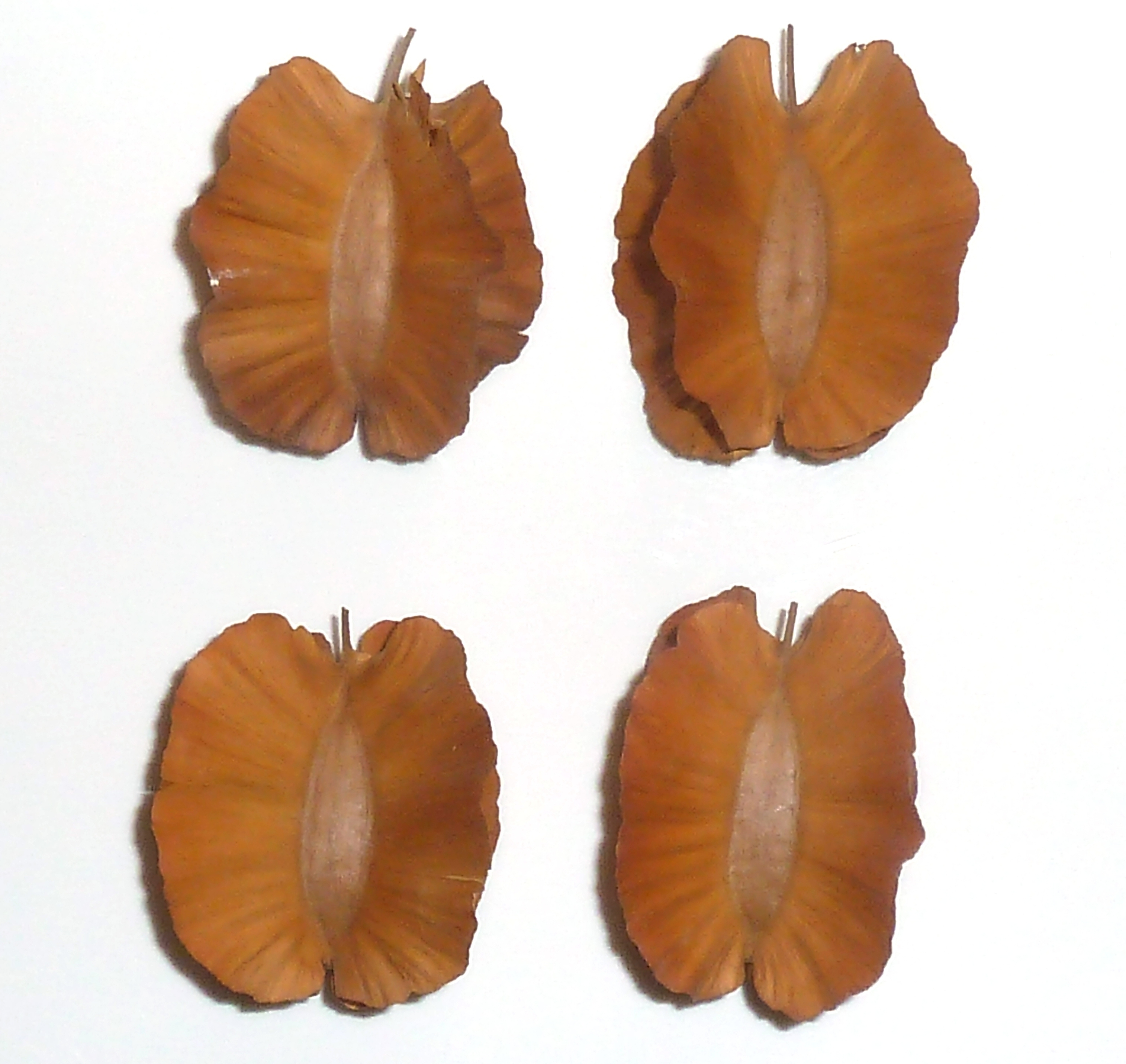
- foliage and green and ripe samaras

Scientific classification
- Kingdom: Plantae
- Clade: Tracheophytes
- Clade: Angiosperms
- Clade: Eudicots
- Clade: Rosids
- Order: Myrtales
- Family: Combretaceae
- Genus: Combretum
- Species: C. mkuzense

Binomial name
- Combretum mkuzense J.D.Carr & Retief

= Combretum mkuzense =

Maputaland bushwillow

Species of tree

Combretum mkuzense, commonly known as the Maputaland bushwillow, is a deciduous shrub or small tree that is native to a restricted area in the lowlands of eastern South Africa and southern Mozambique. It is similar in appearance to the large-fruited bushwillow.

== Range and habitat ==
It is found from Maputaland to the eastern foothills of the Lebombo Mountains and in adjacent southern Mozambique. It occurs in closed woodland savanna and in sand forest, and is known from 12 locations. It has an extent of occurrence of 6,700 km², but is in decline, which is ascribed to clearing for subsistence crops and extraction of firewood.
