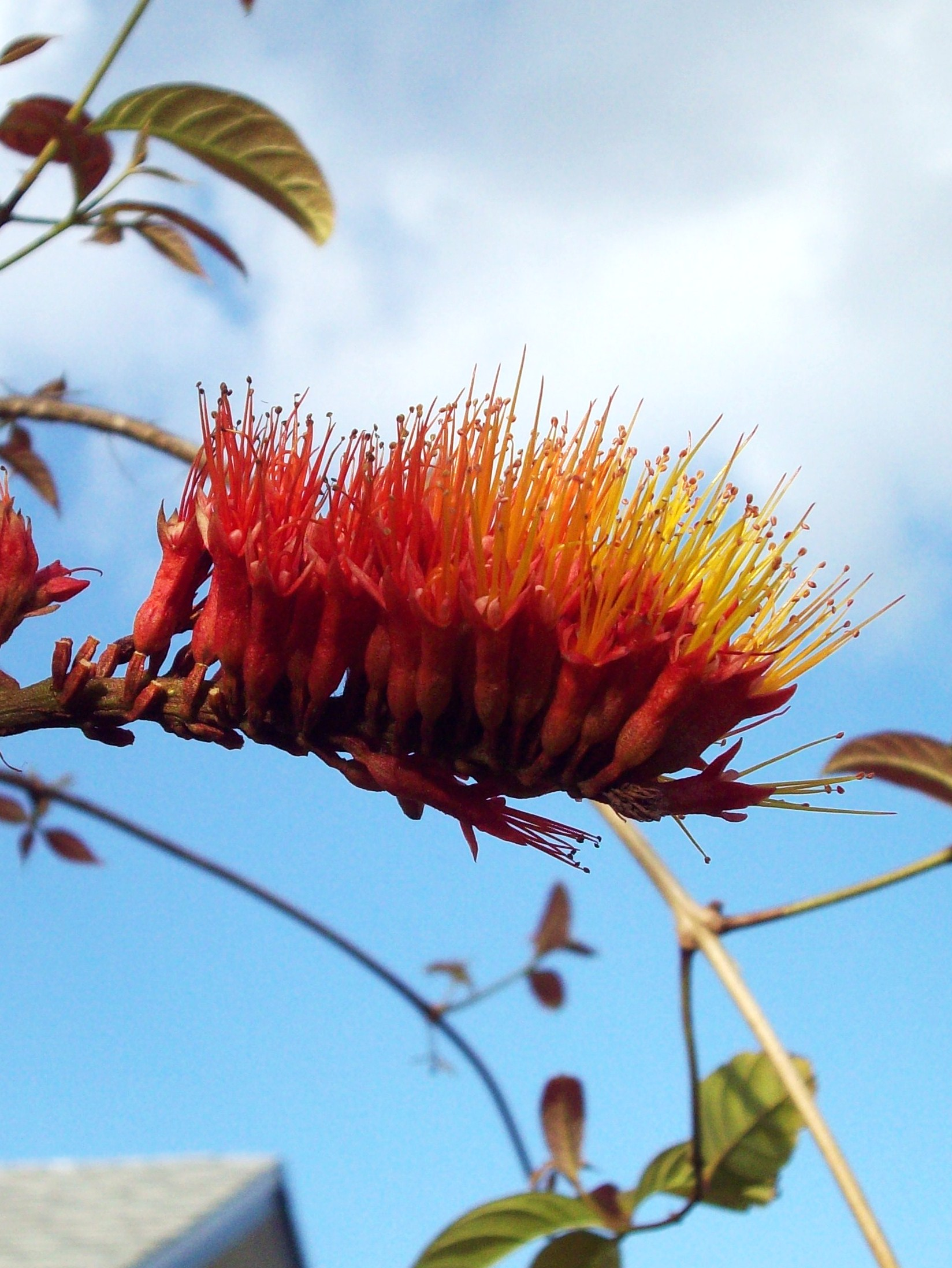

Scientific classification
- Kingdom: Plantae
- Clade: Tracheophytes
- Clade: Angiosperms
- Clade: Eudicots
- Clade: Rosids
- Order: Myrtales
- Family: Combretaceae
- Genus: Combretum
- Species: C. rotundifolium

Binomial name
- Combretum rotundifolium Rich.

Synonyms
- Combretum elegans Kunth

= Combretum rotundifolium =

Species of flowering plant

Combretum rotundifolium, the monkey brush or monkey brush vine, is a plant species in the genus Combretum found in South America.

Combretum rotundifolium contains acidic dammarane arabinofuranosides.
