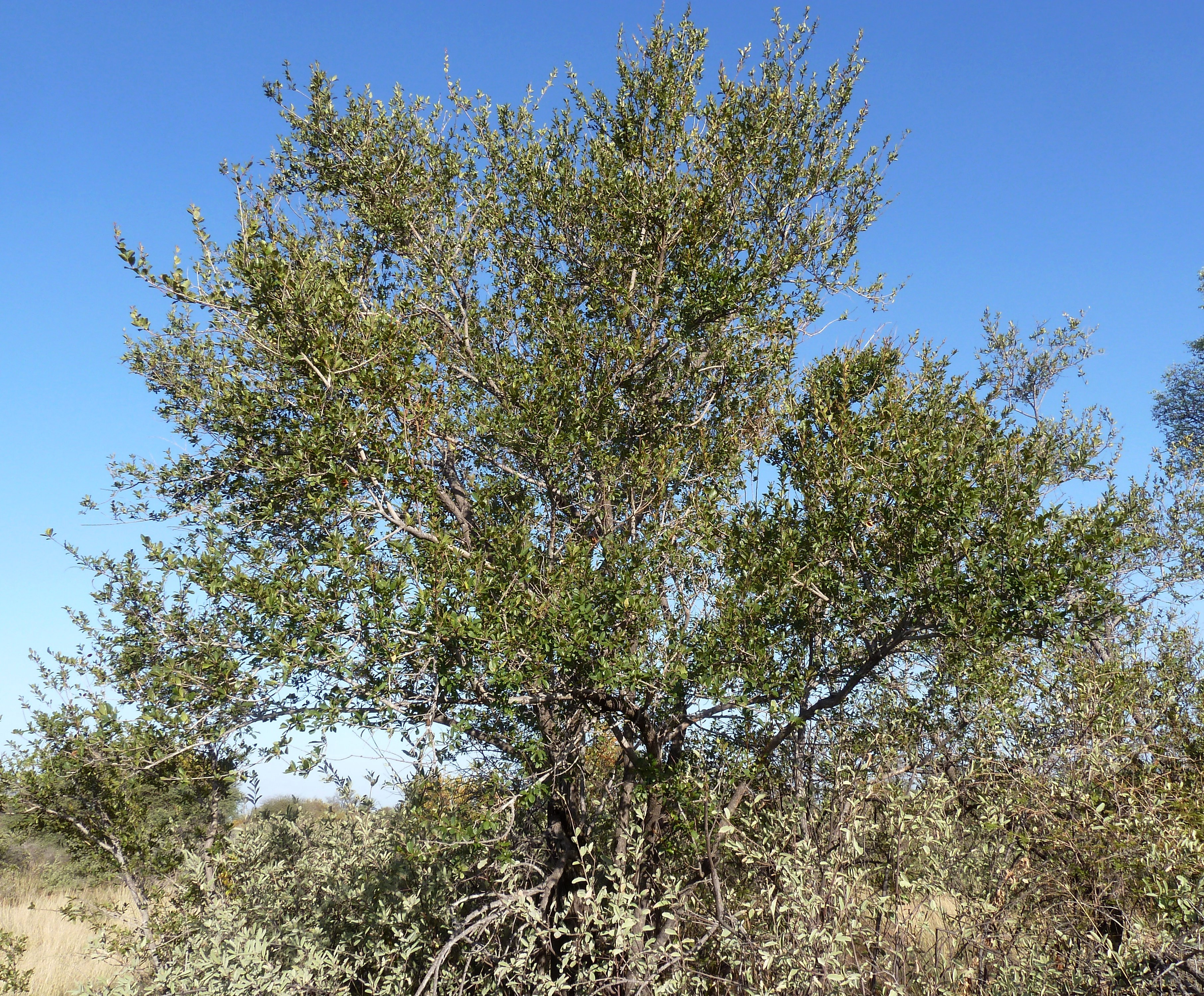

Scientific classification
- Kingdom: Plantae
- Clade: Tracheophytes
- Clade: Angiosperms
- Clade: Eudicots
- Clade: Rosids
- Order: Myrtales
- Family: Combretaceae
- Genus: Combretum
- Species: C. hereroense

Binomial name
- Combretum hereroense Schinz, 1888

Synonyms
- C. rhodesicum Baker f.; C. transvaalense Schinz

= Combretum hereroense =

Russet bushwillow

Species of tree

Combretum hereroense, commonly known as the russet bushwillow and the mouse-eared combretum, is a deciduous shrub or small tree that is found from eastern Africa to northern South Africa. Over its extensive range it is variable with respect to leaf shape, fruit size and indumentum.

== Range and habitat ==
It is found in southern Somalia, southern Ethiopia, Uganda, Kenya, Tanzania, Malawi, Zambia, Mozambique, southern Angola, northern Namibia, Botswana and northern South Africa. They occur from near sea level to about 1,500 m, or locally to 2,700 m.a.s.l. They are a constituent of dry, open bushland of various types, including mopane and secondary gusu woodlands. They are regularly present on termite mounds, the fringes of pans, marshes and dambos, or on river banks (in northern Kenya). They occur in flat or rocky terrain, and thrive on sandy or silty substrates.

== Description ==
=== Habit ===
It is a much-branched, coppicing shrub with drooping or rising branches. They grow to between 5 and 12 metres tall.

=== Leaves ===
The simple, elliptic or obovate leaves are said to be shaped like mouse ears, hence the name Mouse-eared combretum. The leaves are glabrous above and velvety below, and are carried on short lateral twigs. They usually have 3 to 4 pairs of lateral nerves.

=== Flowers ===
The plants produce spikes with creamy white to yellowish flowers in the austral spring time, frequently before the foliage appears.

=== Fruit ===
The rufous brown, four-winged samaras average about 2 cm in diameter.

== Uses ==
Dried leaves are used for tea, the gum is eaten, the wood is harvested for fuel, and the roots are used in traditional medicine.

== Races and varieties ==
The accepted races and varieties are:

- Combretum hereroense subsp. hereroense – southern Africa
  - C. hereroense var. parvifolium (Engl.) Wickens
  - C. hereroense var. villosissimum Engl. & Diels
- Combretum hereroense subsp. grotei (Exell) Wickens – Somalia
- Combretum hereroense subsp. volkensii (Engl.) Wickens – Ethiopia, Kenya, Tanzania

== Gallery ==
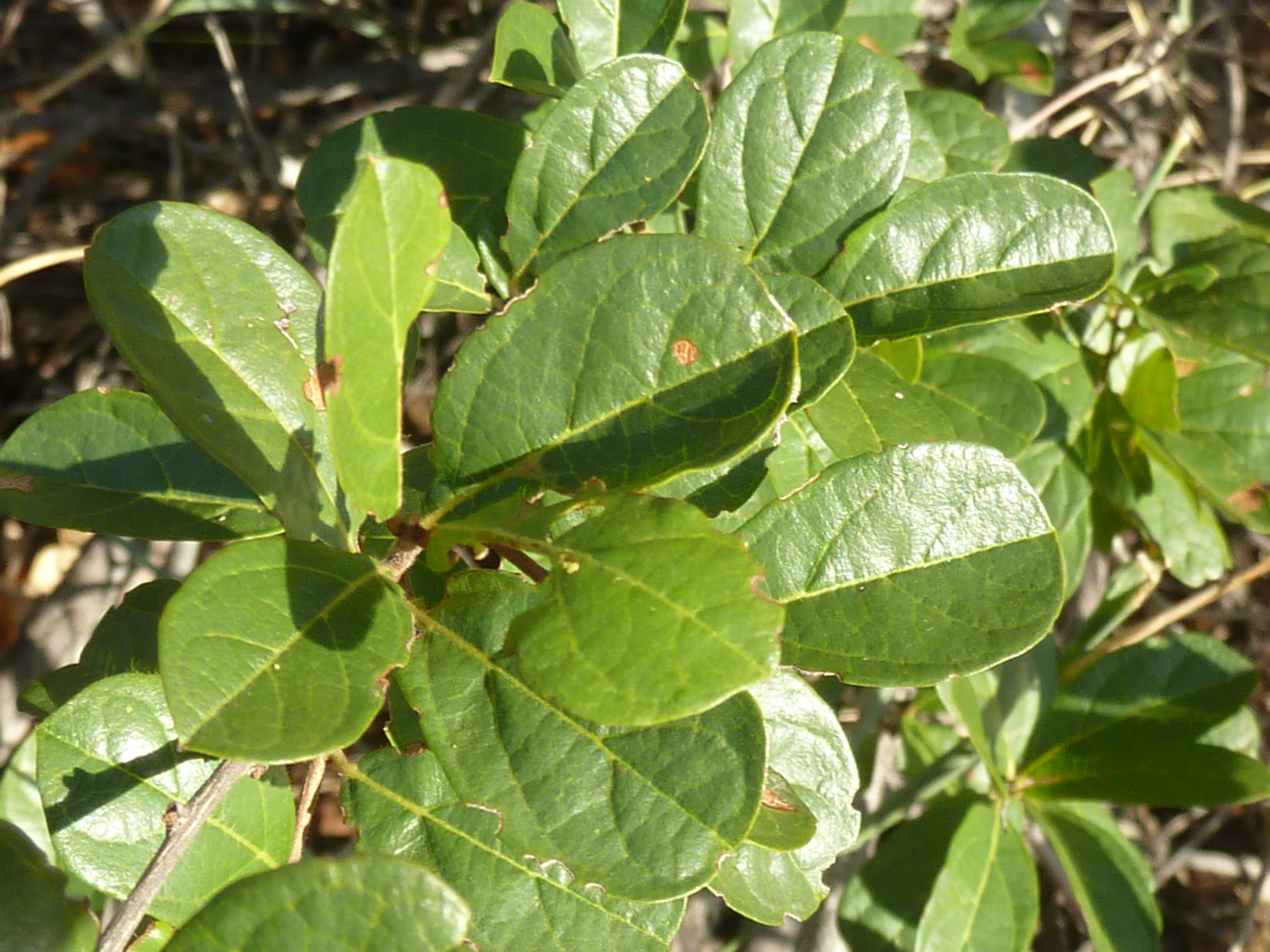
Foliage

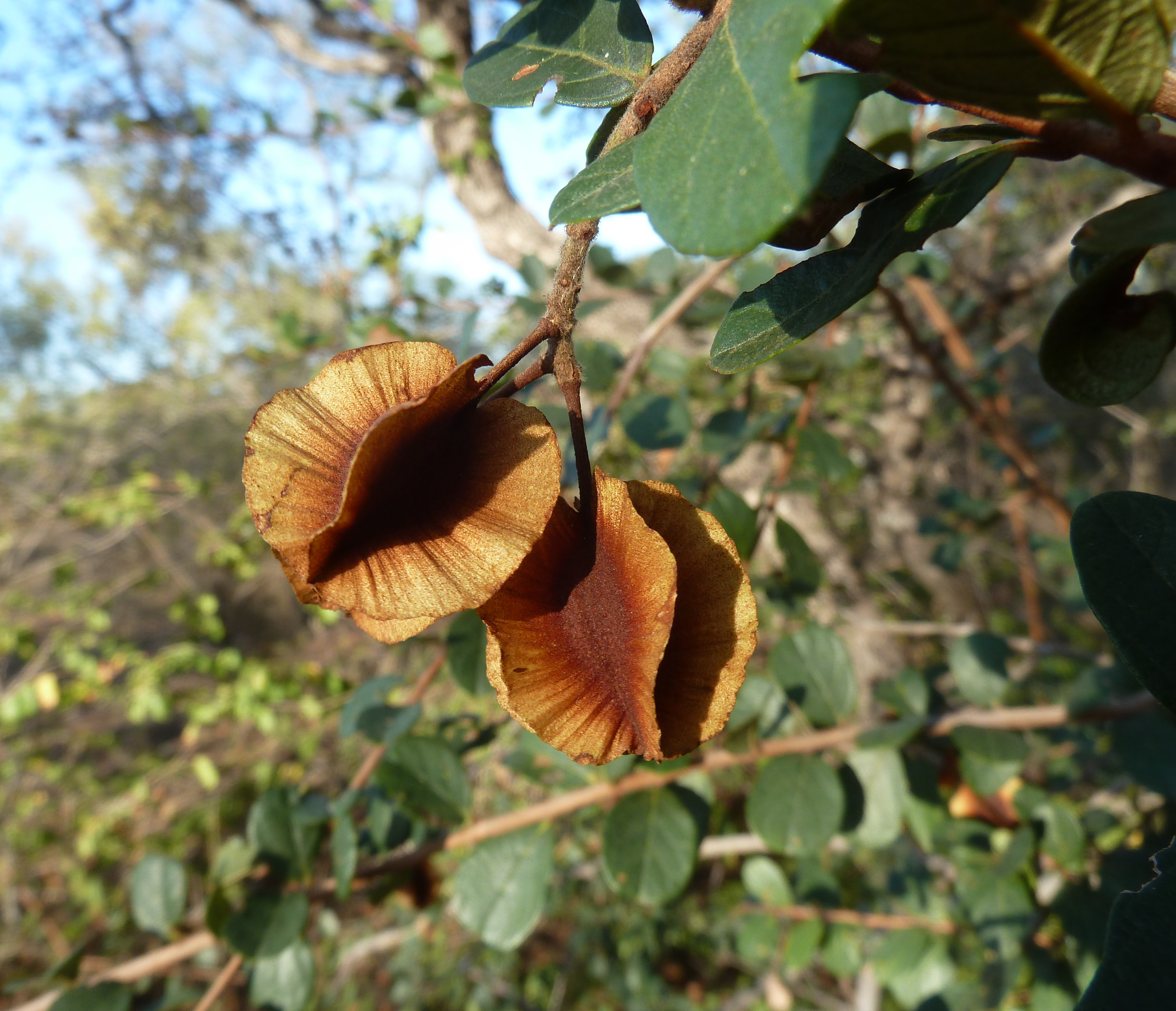
Fruit

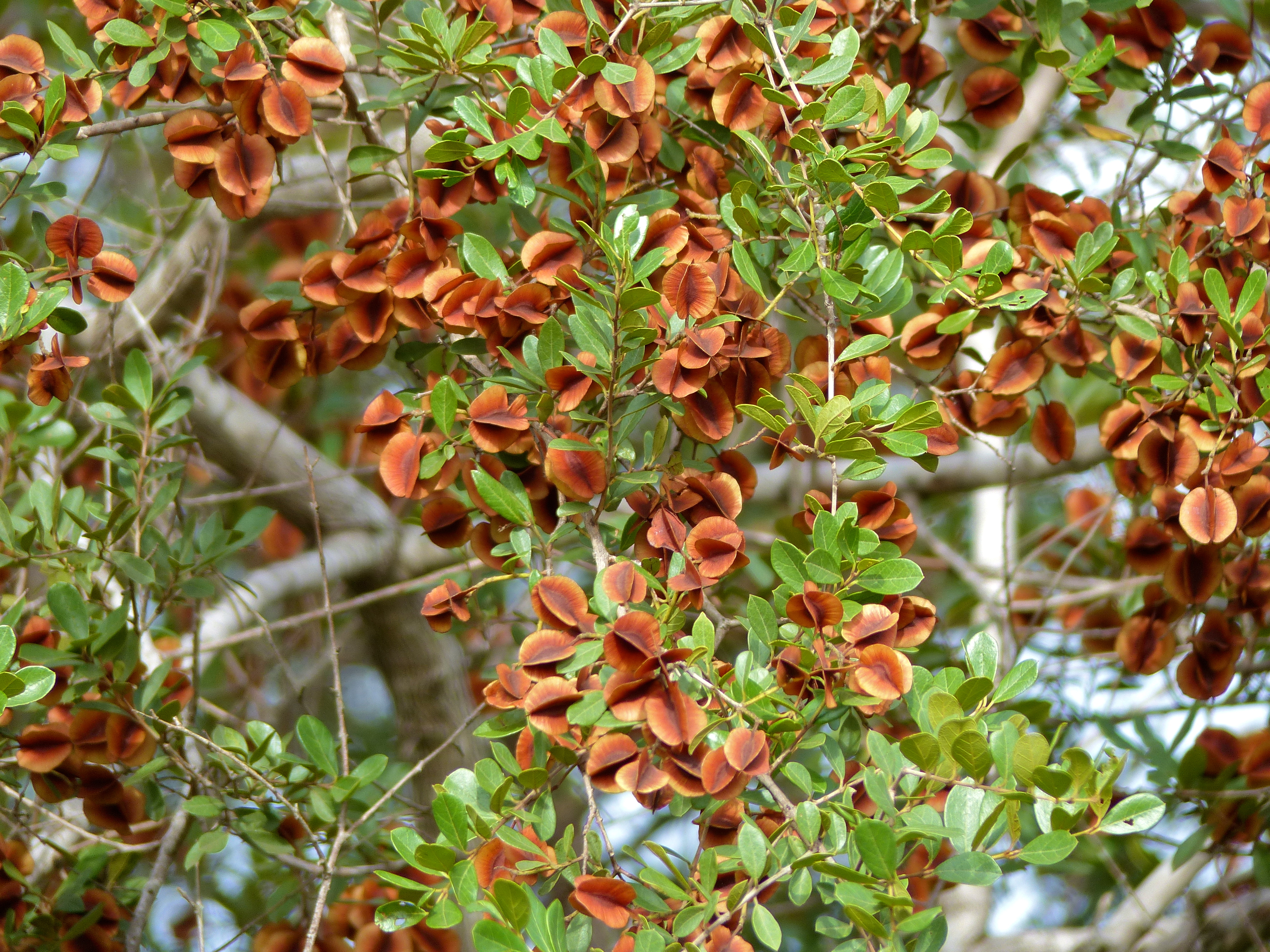
Sprays with fruit
