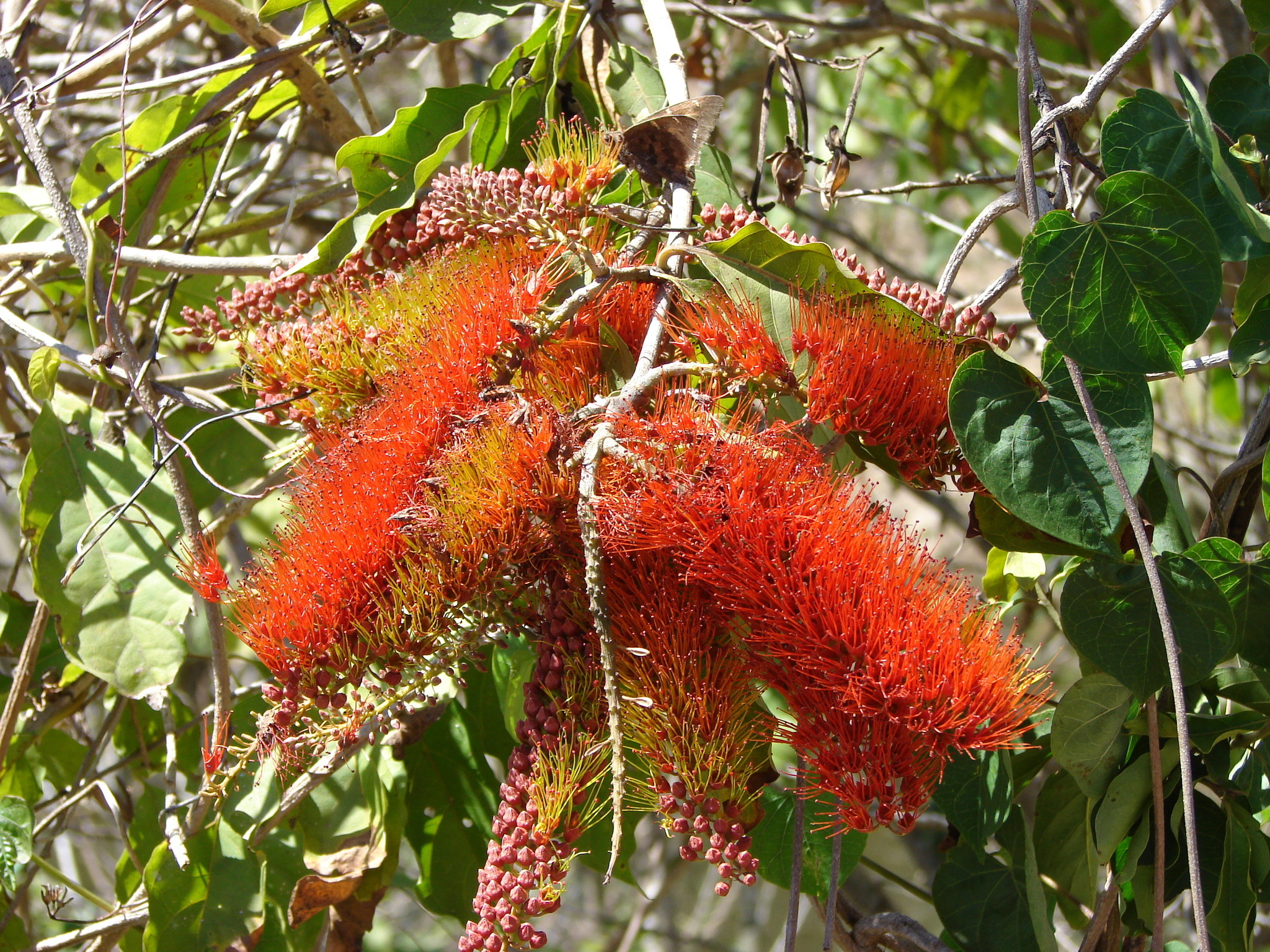

Scientific classification
- Kingdom: Plantae
- Clade: Tracheophytes
- Clade: Angiosperms
- Clade: Eudicots
- Clade: Rosids
- Order: Myrtales
- Family: Combretaceae
- Genus: Combretum
- Species: C. farinosum

Binomial name
- Combretum farinosum Kunth

= Combretum farinosum =

Species of plant

Combretum farinosum is a species of bushwillow in the genus Combretum, native to Central and South America. The species was first described Carl Sigismund Kunth. The plant is widely used as perfume ingredient in cosmetics.
