= Combretum obscurum =

Scientific classification
- Kingdom: Plantae
- Clade: Embryophytes
- Clade: Tracheophytes
- Clade: Angiosperms
- Clade: Eudicots
- Clade: Rosids
- Order: Myrtales
- Family: Combretaceae
- Genus: Combretum
- Species: C. obscurum

Binomial name
- Combretum obscurum Tul.

Synonyms
- Poivrea obscura (Tul.) H.Perrier

Species of flowering plant

Combretum obscurum is a species of tree in the genus Combretum. It is native to Madagascar. It is a liana or climbing shrub growing up to 1.5 m (4.9 ft) tall. The seeds and leaves are used in traditional medicine, and in Malagasy it is known as salay or kinkiliba. It was described in 1856 by French botanist Edmond Tulasne.
