= Combretum glaucocarpum =

Conservation status
- Least Concern (IUCN 3.1)

Scientific classification
- Kingdom: Plantae
- Clade: Tracheophytes
- Clade: Angiosperms
- Clade: Eudicots
- Clade: Rosids
- Order: Myrtales
- Family: Combretaceae
- Genus: Combretum
- Species: C. glaucocarpum

Binomial name
- Combretum glaucocarpum Mart.

Synonyms
- Combretum stigmarium Mart.; Thiloa glaucocarpa (Mart.) Eichler; Thiloa stigmaria (Mart.) Eichler

Species of flowering plant

Combretum glaucocarpum is a species of flowering plant in the Combretaceae family. It is a tree endemic to Bolivia and northern and eastern Brazil.

The species was first described by Carl Friedrich Philipp von Martius in 1841.
