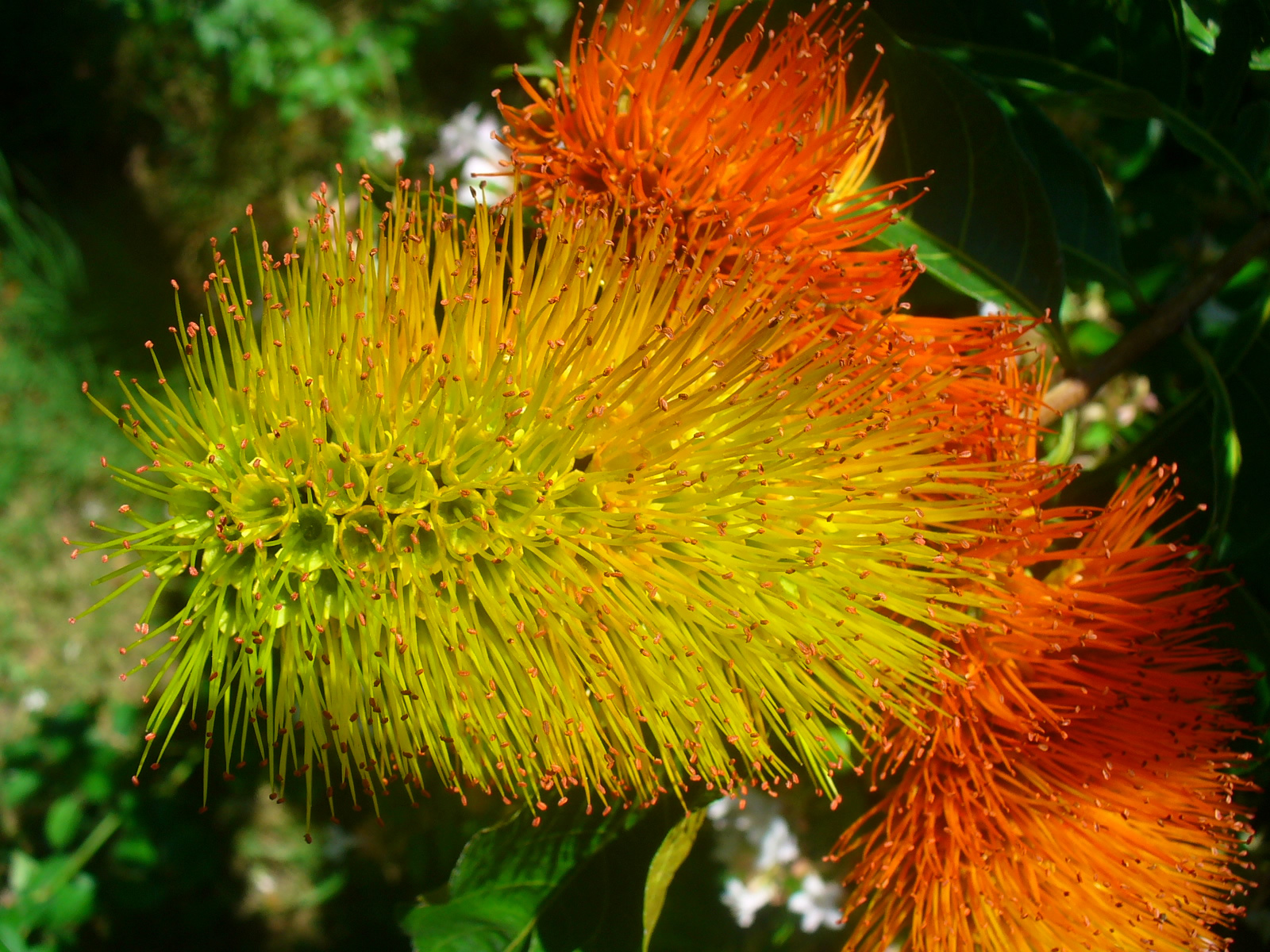

Scientific classification
- Kingdom: Plantae
- Clade: Embryophytes
- Clade: Tracheophytes
- Clade: Angiosperms
- Clade: Eudicots
- Clade: Rosids
- Order: Myrtales
- Family: Combretaceae
- Genus: Combretum
- Species: C. fruticosum

Binomial name
- Combretum fruticosum (Loefl.) Stuntz

Synonyms
- Combretum farinosum Kunth

= Combretum fruticosum =

Orange flame vine

Species of vine

Combretum fruticosum, known as orange flame vine or chameleon vine, is a species of bushwillow that occurs from Mexico to northern Argentina.

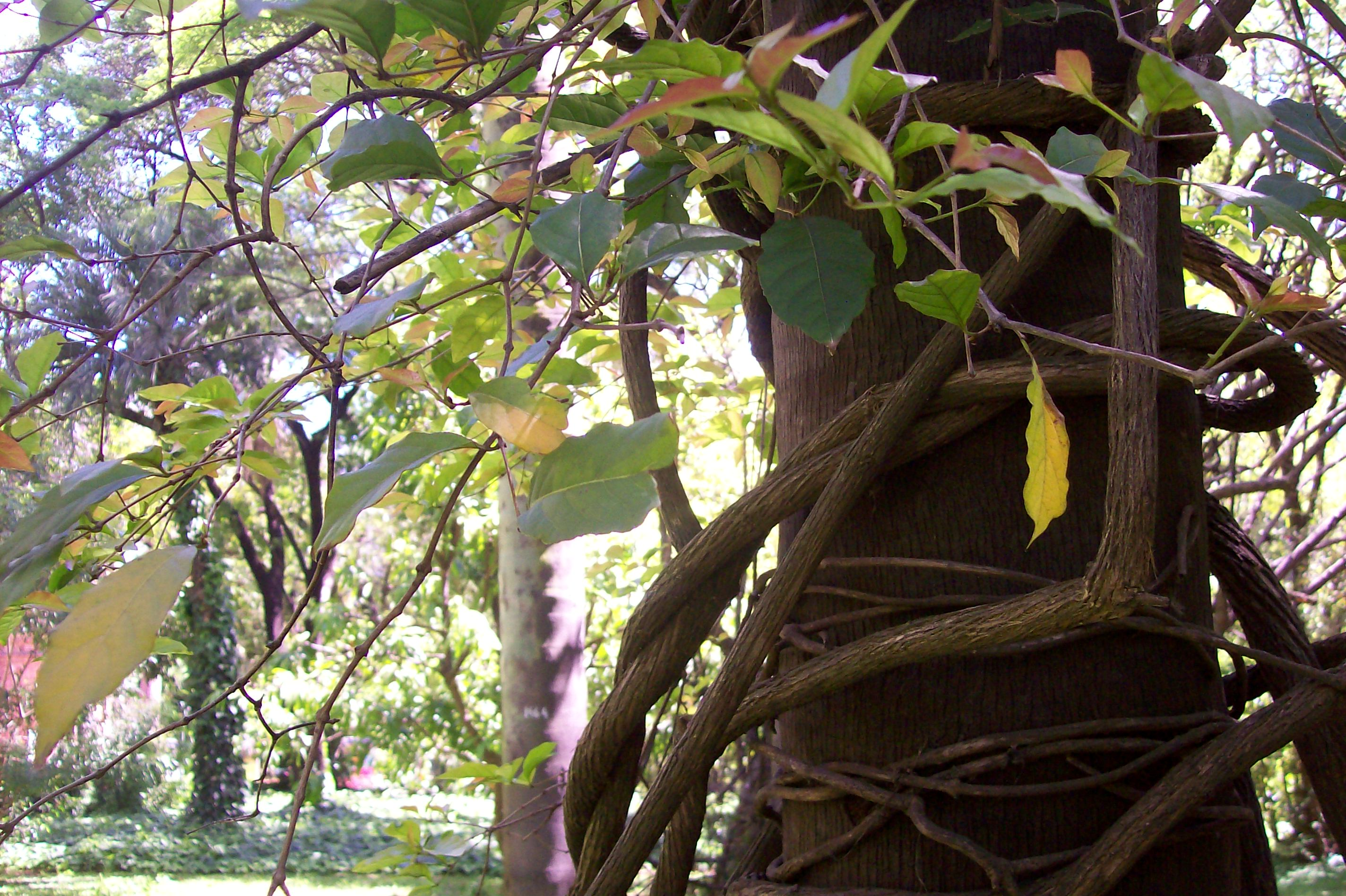
View of the plant

== Description ==
The orange flame vine is a liana that reaches up to 3 metres (9.8 ft) in height without a support and up to 11 metres (36 ft) with a support. The branches are cylindrical and striated.

The leaves are persistent to semipersistent, dense and dry. They are simple, opposite, sometimes alternate, 6 to 16 cm long and 3 to 8 cm broad, with an entire margin and a short petiole.

The flowers appear in summer and are yellowish to reddish, small, grouped in axillary spikes 8 to 16 cm long. The calyx is bell-shaped with 4 lobules 5 mm long, the corolla has 4 very small petals 1 to 1.5 mm long. The 8 stamens are 3 cm long and have reddish anthers. The number of flowers varies from 52 to 93 in each inflorescence.

The fruit forms in autumn and is dry and indehiscent, 2 cm long, and reddish brown.
