= Isostrychnine =

Names
- IUPAC name (1R,13S,14E,19S,21S)-14-(2-Hydroxyethylidene)-8,16-diazahexacyclo[11.5.2.11,8.02,7.016,19.012,21]henicosa-2,4,6,11-tetraen-9-one

Identifiers
CAS Number	467-16-3
3D model (JSmol)	Interactive image
ChEBI	CHEBI:132659
ChEMBL	ChEMBL2164628
ChemSpider	9199295
KEGG	C22928
PubChem CID	11024113
- InChI: InChI=1S/C21H22N2O2/c24-10-7-13-12-22-9-8-21-16-3-1-2-4-17(16)23-19(25)6-5-14(20(21)23)15(13)11-18(21)22/h1-5,7,15,18,20,24H,6,8-12H2/b13-7-/t15-,18-,20-,21+/m0/s1 Key: PNYOGGAOQVIZDM-JQNVFVSUSA-N
- SMILES: С1CN2C/C(=C/CO)/[C@@H]3C[C@H]2[C@@]14[C@@H]5C3=CCC(=O)N5C6=CC=CC=C46

Properties
Chemical formula	C_{21}H_{22}N_{2}O_{2}
Molar mass	334.419 g·mol^{−1}
- Except where otherwise noted, data are given for materials in their standard state (at 25 °C [77 °F], 100 kPa). Infobox references

Isostrychnine is a monoterpenoid indole alkaloid and a structural isomer of strychnine. It is a secondary plant metabolite and may have antitumor activity.

== Occurrence ==
Isostrychnine has been isolated from plant extracts of Strychnos species (e.g the seeds of Strychnos nux-vomica (strychnine tree) or the roots of Strychnos icaja). It is also present in Strychnos ignatii.

== Pharmacology ==
One study observed inhibitory effects against Hep G2 cell proliferation. Another study found isostrychnine arrested the growth of the human hepatocarcinoma cell line SMMC 7721.
