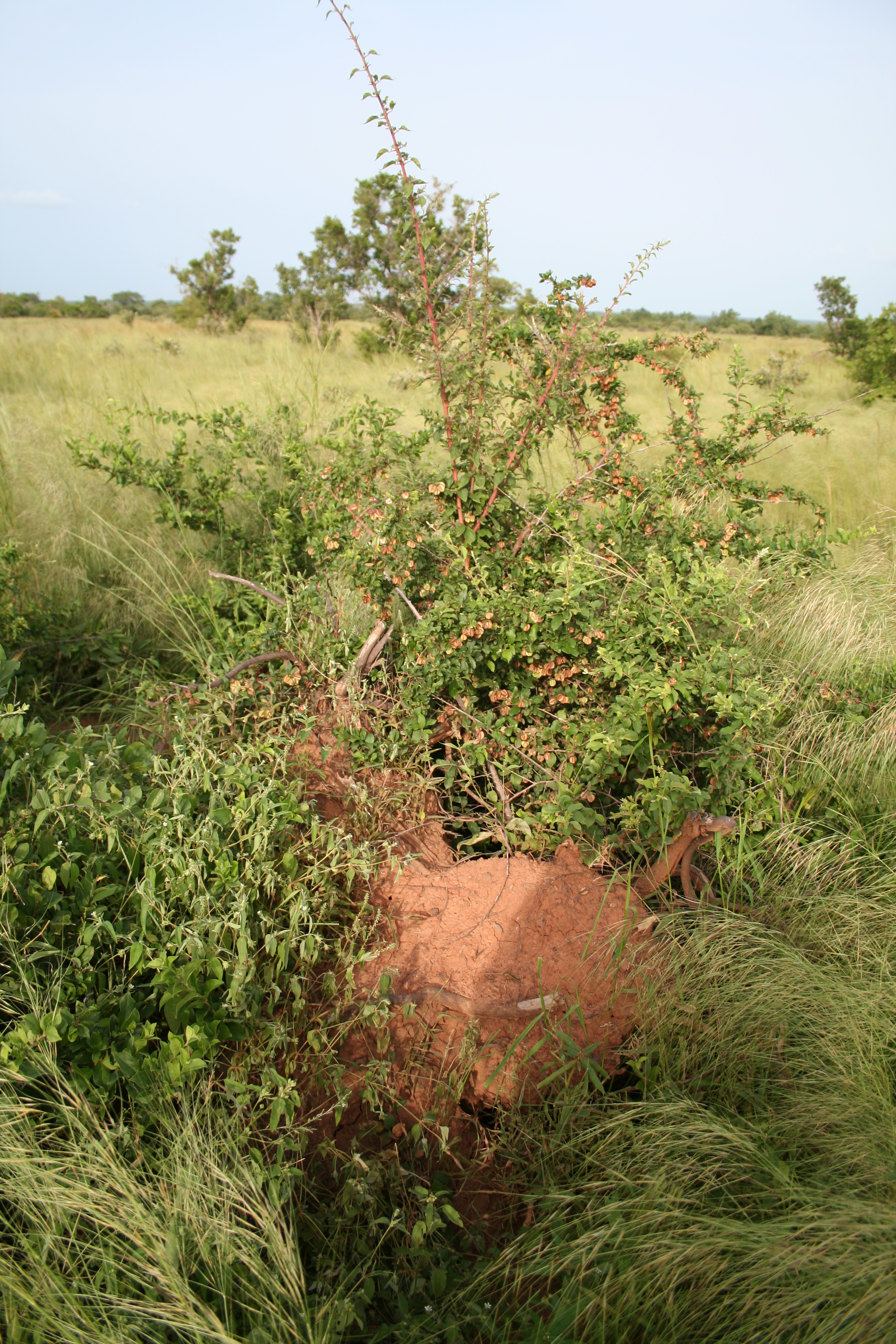
- On a termite mound in Burkina Faso
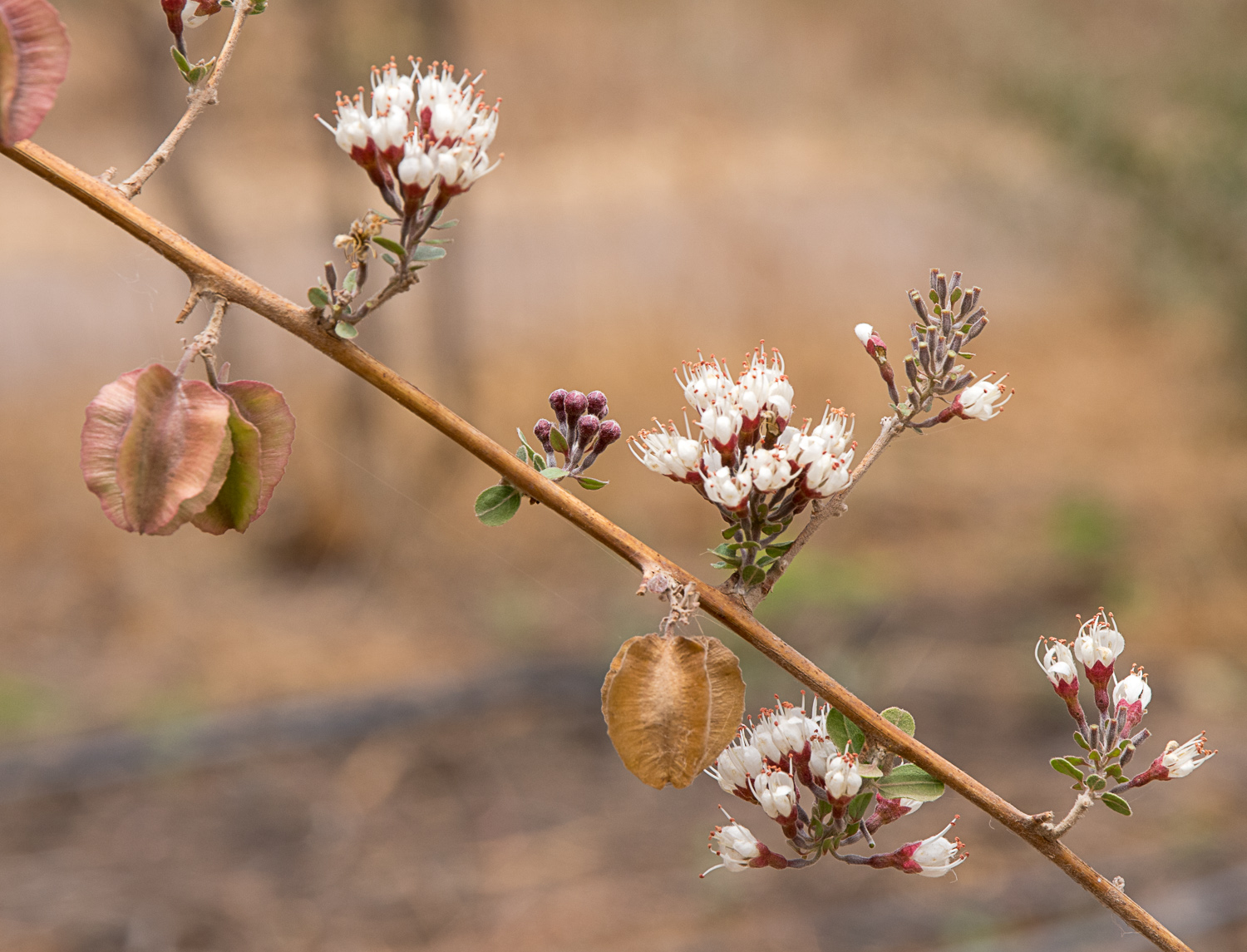
- Flowers and fruit, Senegal

Scientific classification
- Kingdom: Plantae
- Clade: Tracheophytes
- Clade: Angiosperms
- Clade: Eudicots
- Clade: Rosids
- Order: Myrtales
- Family: Combretaceae
- Genus: Combretum
- Species: C. aculeatum

Binomial name
- Combretum aculeatum Vent.

Synonyms
- List: Combretum alternifolium Spreng.; Combretum denhardtiorum Engl. & Diels; Combretum leuconili Schweinf.; Combretum ovale R.Br. ex G.Don; Combretum stefaninianum Pamp.; Commiphora holstii Engl.; Guiera nudiflora Rchb. ex DC.; Poivrea aculeata (Vent.) DC.; Poivrea hartmanniana Schweinf.; Poivrea nudiflora Rchb. ex Walp.; Poivrea ovalis (R.Br. ex G.Don) Walp.

= Combretum aculeatum =

Species of plant

Combretum aculeatum is a species of flowering plant in the bushwillow genus Combretum, family Combretaceae. It is native to the Sahelian and Sudanian savannas and adjacent forest–savanna mosaic in Africa and Saudi Arabia, and has been introduced to Myanmar. High in protein, it is greatly relished as a browse by wild and domesticated mammalian herbivores, except elephants.
