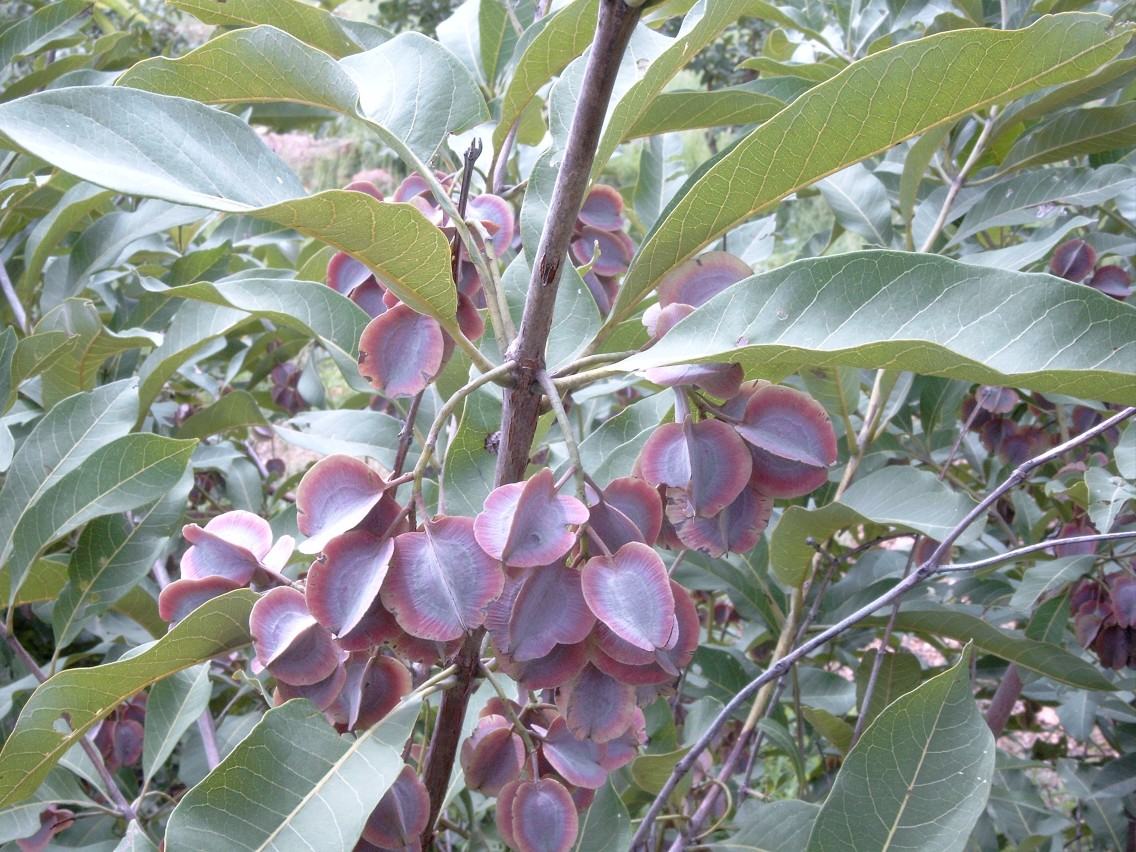
- Combretum collinum with fruit

Scientific classification
- Kingdom: Plantae
- Clade: Tracheophytes
- Clade: Angiosperms
- Clade: Eudicots
- Clade: Rosids
- Order: Myrtales
- Family: Combretaceae
- Genus: Combretum; Loefl.

Species
- About 3272 see text

Synonyms
- Aetia Adans.; Bucholzia Stadtm. ex Willemet; Bureava Baill.; Cacoucia Aubl.; Calopyxis Tul.; Campylochiton Welw. ex Hiern; Campylogyne Welw. ex Hemsl.; Chrysostachys Pohl; Codonocroton E.Mey. ex Engl. & Diels; Cristaria Sonn.; Embryogonia Blume; Forsgardia Vell.; Gonocarpus Ham.; Grislea L.; Hambergera Scop.; Kleinia Crantz; Meiostemon Exell & Stace; Mekistus Lour. ex Gomes Mach.; Physopodium Desv.; Poivrea Comm. ex DC.; Quisqualis L.; Schousboea Willd.; Seguiera Rchb. ex Oliv.; Sheadendron G.Bertol.; Sphalanthus Jack; Thiloa Eichler; Udani Adans.

= Combretum =

Genus of plants in Combretaceae family

Combretum, the bushwillows or combretums, make up the type genus of the family Combretaceae. The genus comprises about 272 species of trees and shrubs, most of which are native to tropical and southern Africa, about 5 to Madagascar, but there are others that are native to tropical Asia, New Guinea and the Bismarck Archipelago, Australia, and tropical America.

Around 17 species in the genus Quisqualis are very similar to Combretum and are now classified as species of the genus.

Though somewhat reminiscent of willows (Salix) in their habitus, they are not particularly close relatives of these.

== Ecology ==
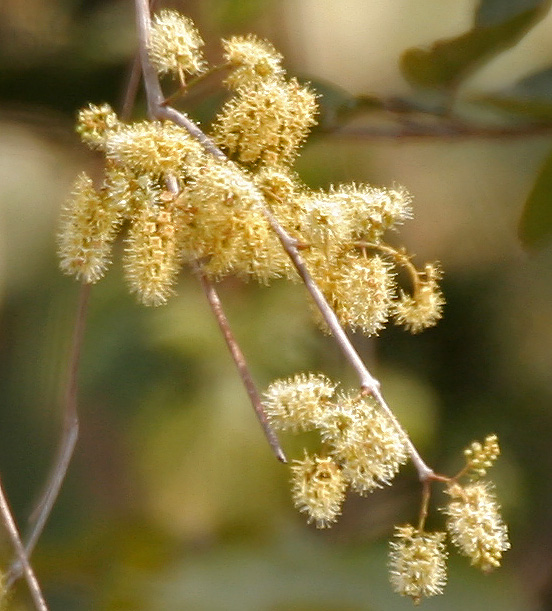
Combretum albidum in Kinnerasani Wildlife Sanctuary, Andhra Pradesh, India

Bushwillow trees often are important plants in their habitat. Savannahs in Africa, in particular those growing on granitic soils, are often dominated by Combretum and its close relative Terminalia. For example, C. apiculatum is a notable tree in the Angolan mopane woodlands ecoregion in the Kunene River basin in southern Africa.

Other species of this genus are a major component of Southwestern Amazonian moist forests. This genus contains several species that are pollinated by mammals other than bats, which is quite rare indeed. But most species are more conventionally pollinated by insects or birds.

Typhlodromus combretum, a mite of the family Phytoseiidae, was discovered on a bushwillow plant and is named after this genus. Other herbivores that eat Combretum foliage include the caterpillars of the Brown Awl (Badamia exclamationis) which is found on C. albidum, C. latifolium and C. ovalifolium; those of the Orange-tailed Awl (Bibasis sena) are recorded from C. extensum and C. latifolium.

== Use by humans ==
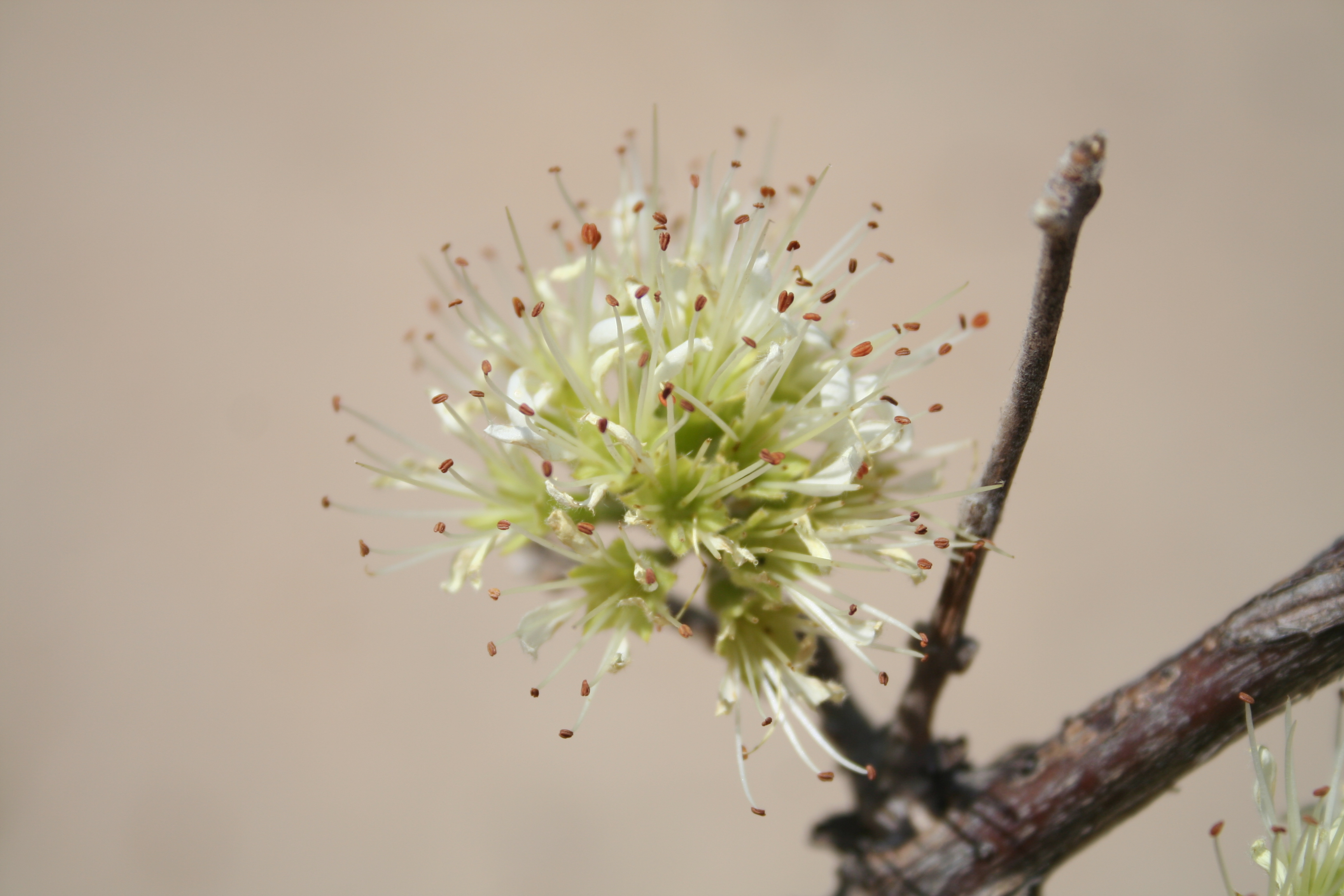
Combretum aculeatum inflorescence

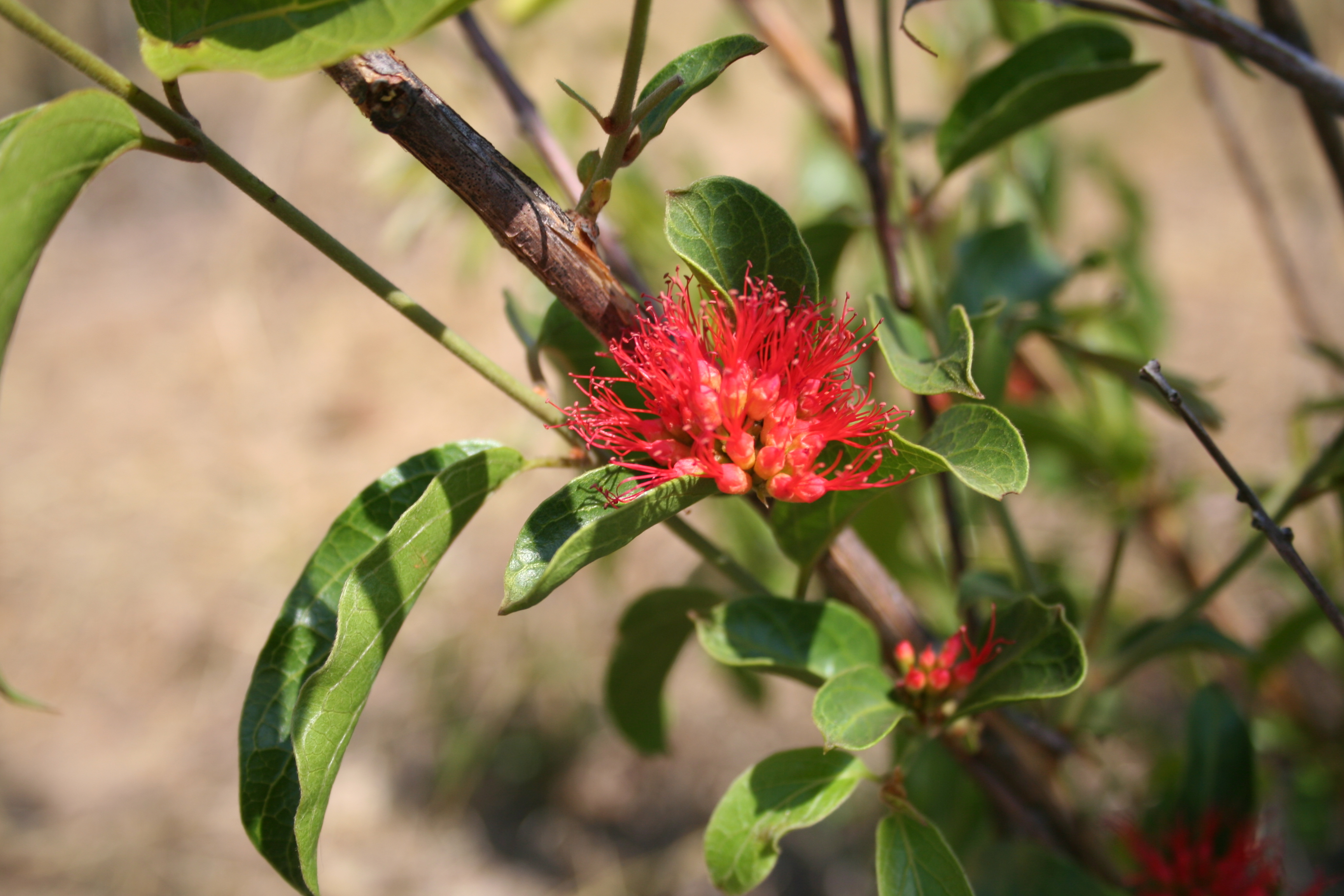
Combretum paniculatum

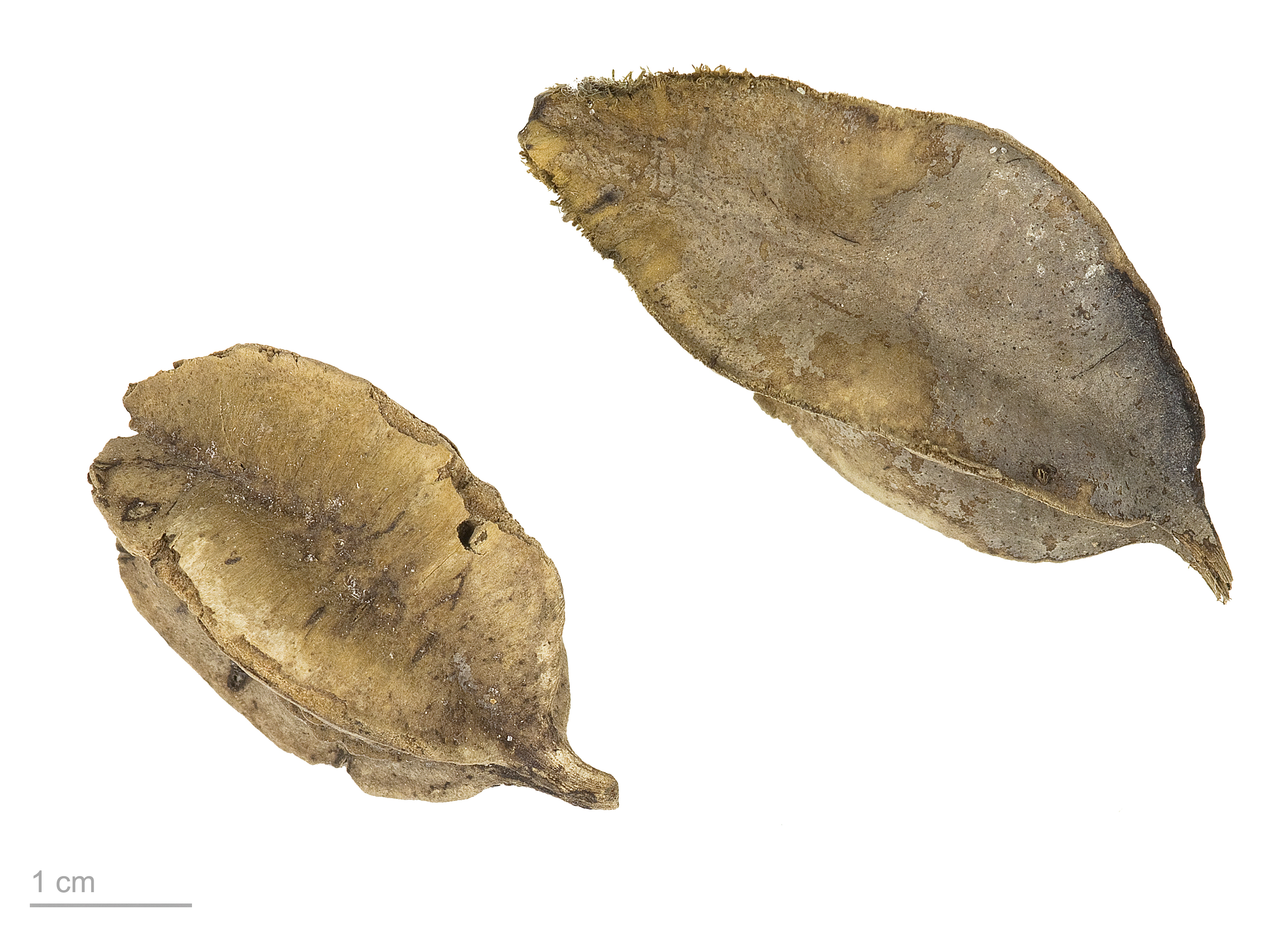
Combretum acutum – MHNT

Several species are used in African or Indian herbal medicine. Several species of this genus in Madagascar known collectively as voantamenaka or voatamenaka (from voa 'fruit' and menaka 'oil') are used in traditional Malagasy medicine as deworming remedies. The class of chemical compounds known as combretastatins were first isolated from South African bushwillow (Combretum afrum), from which they get their name. One synthetic derivative, fosbretabulin disodium (combretastatin A4 phosphate), underwent preliminary study for the treatment of anaplastic thyroid cancer, but it was not effective enough to progress to more advanced trials. C. molle is also recorded to contain antioxidants such as punicalagin, which is also found in pomegranates (Punica granatum), a somewhat related plant.

The botanist George Don studied this genus extensively. The Luvuvhu River in southern Africa was named after the river's bushwillows (C. erythrophyllum), locally known as muvuvhu.

== Species ==
As of April 2021, there are 272 accepted species of Combretum:

- Combretum aculeatum Vent.
- Combretum acuminatum Roxb.
- Combretum acutifolium Exell
- Combretum acutum M.A.Lawson
- Combretum adenogonium Steud. ex A.Rich.
- Combretum adrianii Jongkind
- Combretum afzelii G.Don
- Combretum alatum Craib
- Combretum albiflorum (Tul.) Jongkind
- Combretum albopunctatum Suess.
- Combretum alfredi Hance
- Combretum andongense Engl. & Diels
- Combretum andradae Exell & J.G.García
- Combretum angolense Welw. ex M.A.Lawson
- Combretum angustipetalum Chiov.
- Combretum annulatum Craib
- Combretum apetalum Wall. ex Kurz
- Combretum aphanopetalum Engl. & Diels
- Combretum apiculatum Sond.
- Combretum argenteum Bertol.
- Combretum argyrotrichum Welw. ex M.A.Lawson
- Combretum assimile Eichler
- Combretum atropurpureum Engl. & Diels
- Combretum aureonitens Engl. & Gilg
- Combretum auriculatum Engl. & Diels
- Combretum barbatum G.Don
- Combretum batesii Exell
- Combretum bauchiense Hutch. & Dalziel
- Combretum baumii Engl. & Gilg
- Combretum bipindense Engl. & Diels
- Combretum blepharopetalum Wickens
- Combretum boinensis Jongkind
- Combretum bracteatum (M.A.Lawson) Engl. & Diels
- Combretum bracteosum (Hochst.) Engl. & Diels
- Combretum brassiciforme Exell
- Combretum brevistylum Eichler
- Combretum brunneum Engl. & Diels
- Combretum butyrosum (G.Bertol.) Tul.
- Combretum cacoucia Exell ex Sandwith
- Combretum afrum (Eckl. & Zeyh.) Kuntze
- Combretum camporum Engl.
- Combretum capitatum De Wild. & Exell
- Combretum capituliflorum Fenzl ex Schweinf.
- Combretum capuronii Jongkind
- Combretum carringtonianum Exell & J.G.García
- Combretum caudatisepalum Exell & J.G.García
- Combretum celastroides Welw. ex M.A.Lawson
- Combretum chinense G.Don
- Combretum chionanthoides Engl. & Diels
- Combretum cinereopetalum Engl. & Diels
- Combretum cinnabarinum Engl. & Diels
- Combretum clarense Jongkind
- Combretum coccineum (Sonn.) Lam.
- Combretum collinum Fresen.
- Combretum comosum G.Don
- Combretum conchipetalum Engl. & Diels
- Combretum confertum (Benth.) M.A.Lawson
- Combretum × confusum Merr. & Rolfe
- Combretum congolanum Liben
- Combretum constrictum (Benth.) M.A.Lawson
- Combretum contractum Engl. & Diels
- Combretum coriifolium Engl. & Diels
- Combretum coursianum (H.Perrier) Jongkind
- Combretum cuspidatum Planch. ex Benth.
- Combretum decandrum Jacq.
- Combretum decaryi Jongkind
- Combretum deciduum Collett & Hemsl.
- Combretum demeusei De Wild.
- Combretum discolor Taub.
- Combretum dolichopodum Gilg
- Combretum duarteanum Cambess.
- Combretum echirense Jongkind
- Combretum edwardsii Exell
- Combretum elaeagnoides Klotzsch
- Combretum engleri Schinz, De Wild. & T.Durand
- Combretum eriogynum (H.Perrier) Jongkind
- Combretum erosum Jongkind
- Combretum erythrophloeum Gilg & Ledermann ex Engl.
- Combretum erythrophyllum (Burch.) Sond.
- Combretum esteriense Jongkind
- Combretum evisceratum (H.Perrier) Jongkind
- Combretum exalatum Engl.
- Combretum exannulatum (O.Hoffm.) Engl. & Diels
- Combretum excelsum Keay
- Combretum exellii Jongkind
- Combretum falcatum (Welw. ex Hiern) Jongkind
- Combretum farinosum Kunth
- Combretum flammeum Welw. ex Hiern
- Combretum foliatum Craib
- Combretum frangulifolium Kunth
- Combretum fruticosum (Loefl.) Stuntz
- Combretum fulvum Keay
- Combretum fuscum Planch. ex Benth.
- Combretum gabonense Exell
- Combretum germainii Liben
- Combretum ghesquierei Liben
- Combretum gillettianum Liben
- Combretum glabrum DC.
- Combretum glaucocarpum Mart.
- Combretum glutinosum Perr. ex DC.
- Combretum goetzei Engl. & Diels
- Combretum goldieanum F.Muell.
- Combretum goossensii De Wild. & Exell
- Combretum gordonii Jongkind
- Combretum gossweileri Exell
- Combretum gracile Schott
- Combretum graciliflorum Stace
- Combretum grandidieri Drake
- Combretum grandiflorum G.Don
- Combretum griffithii Van Heurck & Müll.Arg.
- Combretum harmsianum Diels
- Combretum harrisii Wickens
- Combretum hartmannianum Schweinf.
- Combretum haullevilleanum De Wild.
- Combretum hensii Engl. & Diels
- Combretum hereroense Schinz
- Combretum hilarianum D.Dietr.
- Combretum holstii Engl.
- Combretum homalioides Hutch. & Dalziel
- Combretum igneiflorum Rendón & R.Delgad.
- Combretum illairii Engl.
- Combretum imberbe Wawra
- Combretum indicum (L.) DeFilipps
- Combretum inflatum Jongkind
- Combretum ivanii Jongkind
- Combretum kasaiense Liben
- Combretum kirkii M.A.Lawson
- Combretum klossii Ridl.
- Combretum klotzschii Welw. ex M.A.Lawson
- Combretum kostermansii Exell
- Combretum kraussii Hochst.
- Combretum lanceolatum Pohl ex Eichler
- Combretum lanuginosum G.Don
- Combretum latialatum Engl.
- Combretum latifolium Blume
- Combretum laxum Jacq.
- Combretum lecardii Engl. & Diels
- Combretum leprosum Mart.
- Combretum lindense Exell & Mildbr.
- Combretum lisowskii Jongkind
- Combretum littoreum (Engl.) Engl.
- Combretum llewelynii J.F.Macbr.
- Combretum lokele Liben
- Combretum longicollum Jongkind
- Combretum longipilosum Engl. & Diels
- Combretum longispicatum (Engl.) Engl. & Diels
- Combretum longistipitatum Jongkind
- Combretum louisii Liben
- Combretum lukafuensis De Wild.
- Combretum luxenii Exell
- Combretum macrocalyx (Tul.) Jongkind
- Combretum malabaricum (Bedd.) Sujana, Ratheesh & Anil Kumar
- Combretum mannii G.Lawson ex Engl. & Diels
- Combretum marginatum Engl. & Diels
- Combretum marquesii Engl. & Diels
- Combretum mellifluum Eichler
- Combretum meridionalis (H.Perrier) Jongkind
- Combretum micranthum G.Don
- Combretum microphyllum Klotzsch
- Combretum mkuzense J.D.Carr & Retief
- Combretum moggii Exell
- Combretum molle R.Br. ex G.Don
- Combretum monetaria Mart.
- Combretum mooreanum Exell
- Combretum mortehanii De Wild. & Exell
- Combretum mossambicense (Klotzsch) Engl.
- Combretum mucronatum Schumach. & Thonn.
- Combretum multinervium Exell
- Combretum mussaendiflorum Engl. & Diels
- Combretum mweroense Baker
- Combretum nanum Buch.-Ham. ex D.Don
- Combretum ndjoleense Jongkind
- Combretum nigrescens King
- Combretum nigricans Lepr. ex Guill. & Perr.
- Combretum nioroense Aubrév. ex Keay
- Combretum niphophilum Gilg & Ledermann ex Engl.
- Combretum nusbaumeri Jongkind & L.Gaut.
- Combretum oatesii Rolfe
- Combretum obovatum F.Hoffm.
- Combretum obscurum Tul.
- Combretum octagonum (H.Perrier) Jongkind
- Combretum olivaceum Engl.
- Combretum oudenhovenii Jongkind
- Combretum ovalifolium Roxb. ex G.Don
- Combretum oxygonium (Tul.) Jongkind
- Combretum oxystachyum Welw. ex M.A.Lawson
- Combretum oyemense Exell
- Combretum padoides Engl. & Diels
- Combretum paniculatum Vent.
- Combretum paradoxum Welw. ex M.A.Lawson
- Combretum paraguariense (Eichler) Stace
- Combretum patelliforme Engl. & Diels
- Combretum paucinervium Engl. & Diels
- Combretum pavonii G.Don
- Combretum pecoense Exell
- Combretum pellegrinianum Exell
- Combretum pentagonum M.A.Lawson
- Combretum petrophilum Retief
- Combretum phaeocarpum Mart.
- Combretum pilosum Roxb. ex G.Don
- Combretum pisoniiflorum (Klotzsch) Engl.
- Combretum pisonioides Taub.
- Combretum platypterum (Welw.) Hutch. & Dalziel
- Combretum polyanthum Jongkind
- Combretum polystictum Hiern
- Combretum procursum Craib
- Combretum psidioides Welw.
- Combretum punctatum Blume
- Combretum purpureiflorum Engl.
- Combretum pyramidatum Desv.
- Combretum pyrifolium (C.Presl) Kurz
- Combretum quadrangulare Kurz
- Combretum quadratum Craib
- Combretum rabiense Jongkind
- Combretum racemosum P.Beauv.
- Combretum razianum K.G.Bhat
- Combretum recurvatum Sujana, Ratheesh & Anil Kumar
- Combretum relictum Hutch. & Dalziel
- Combretum rhodanthum Engl. & Diels
- Combretum riggenbachianum Gilg & Ledermann ex Engl.
- Combretum robustum Jongkind
- Combretum robynsii Exell
- Combretum rochetianum A.Rich. ex A.Juss.
- Combretum rohrii Exell
- Combretum rotundifolium Rich.
- Combretum rovirosae Exell
- Combretum roxburghii Spreng.
- Combretum rupestre Jongkind & Texier
- Combretum rupicola Ridl.
- Combretum sanjappae Chakrab. & Lakra
- Combretum scandens Liben
- Combretum schumannii Engl.
- Combretum sericeum G.Don
- Combretum shivannae Gholave, Kambale, Lekhak & S.R.Yadav
- Combretum sordidum Exell
- Combretum sphaeroides (Tul.) Jongkind
- Combretum spinosum Bonpl.
- Combretum stenopterum Exell
- Combretum stocksii Sprague
- Combretum struempellianum Gilg & Ledermann ex Engl.
- Combretum stylesii O.Maurin, Jordaan & A.E.van Wyk
- Combretum subglabratum De Wild.
- Combretum subumbellatum (Baker) Jongkind
- Combretum sundaicum Miq.
- Combretum sylvicola O.Maurin
- Combretum tarquense Clark
- Combretum tenuipetiolatum Wickens
- Combretum tessmannii Gilg ex Engl.
- Combretum tetragonocarpum Kurz
- Combretum tetralophoides Slooten
- Combretum tetralophum C.B.Clarke
- Combretum teuschii O.Hoffm.
- Combretum tibatiense Gilg & Ledermann ex Engl.
- Combretum tomentosum G.Don
- Combretum towaense Engl. & Diels
- Combretum trichophyllum Baker
- Combretum trifoliatum Vent.
- Combretum ulei Exell
- Combretum umbricola Engl.
- Combretum vendae A.E.van Wyk
- Combretum vernicosum Rusby
- Combretum villosum (Tul.) Jongkind
- Combretum violaceum (Tul.) Jongkind
- Combretum virgatum Welw. ex M.A.Lawson
- Combretum viscosum Exell
- Combretum wallichii DC.
- Combretum wattii Exell
- Combretum wilksii Jongkind
- Combretum winitii Craib
- Combretum xanthothyrsum Engl. & Diels
- Combretum youngii Exell
- Combretum zenkeri Engl. & Diels
- Combretum zeyheri Sond.
