= Strephonema =

Scientific classification
- Kingdom: Plantae
- Clade: Tracheophytes
- Clade: Angiosperms
- Clade: Eudicots
- Clade: Rosids
- Order: Myrtales
- Family: Combretaceae
- Genus: Strephonema; Hook.f.

Genus of plants

Strephonema is a genus of flowering plants belonging to the family Combretaceae.

Its native range is Western and Western Central Tropical Africa.

Species:

- Strephonema mannii Benth. & Hook.f.
- Strephonema polybotryum Mildbr.
- Strephonema pseudocola A.Chev.
- Strephonema sericeum Benth. & Hook.f.
