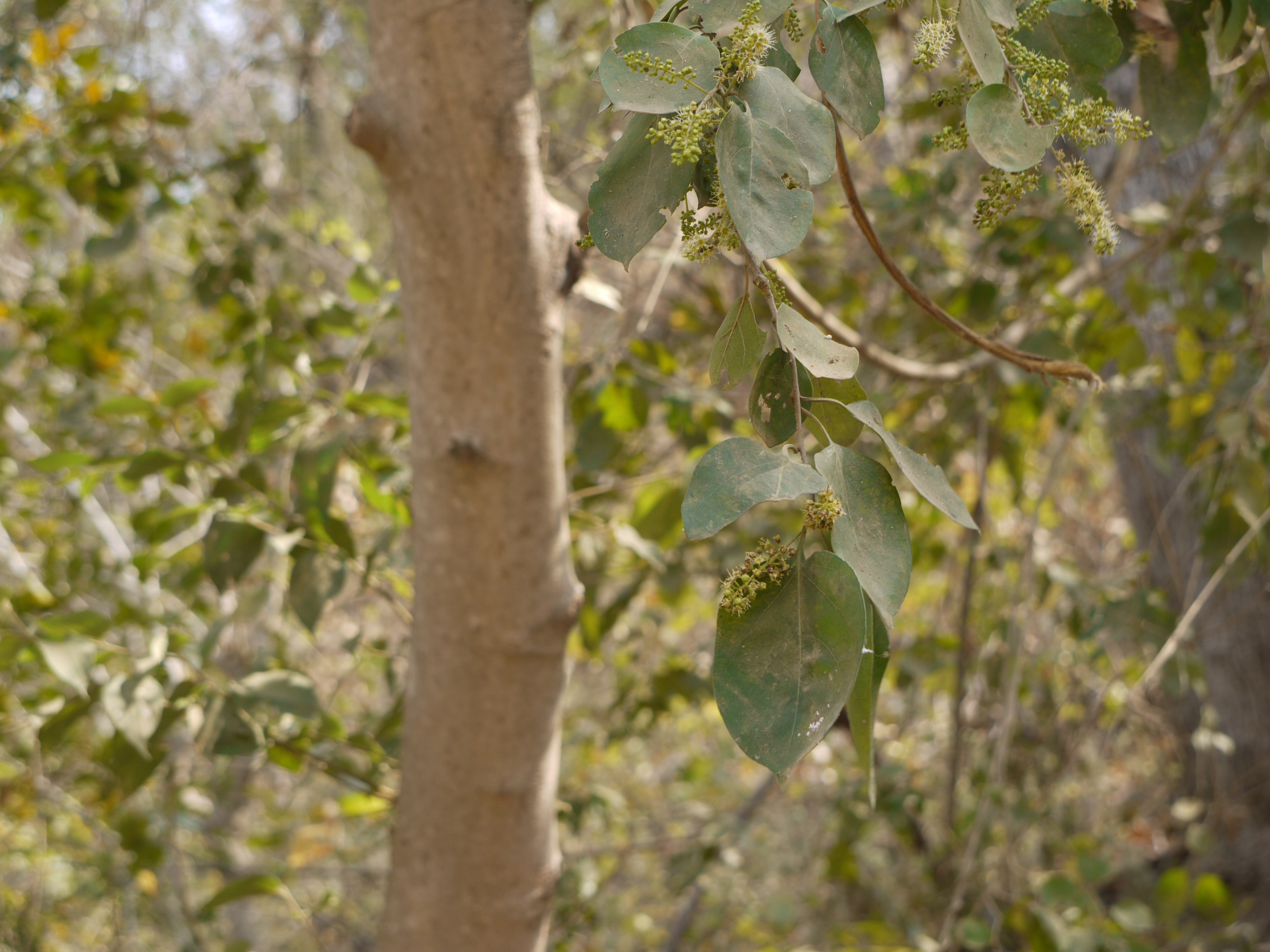
- Combretum albidum

Scientific classification
- Kingdom: Plantae
- Clade: Tracheophytes
- Clade: Angiosperms
- Clade: Eudicots
- Clade: Rosids
- Order: Myrtales
- Family: Combretaceae
- Genus: Combretum
- Species: C. albidum

Binomial name
- Combretum albidum G.Don

= Combretum albidum =

Species of flowering plant

Combretum albidum is a species of woody climbing shrub in the family Combretaceae. It is native to the Indian subcontinent, including India and Sri Lanka, where it occurs in semi-evergreen, deciduous and riverine forests.

The species was first described by George Don in 1827 in Transactions of the Linnean Society of London.

== Description ==
Combretum albidum is a large deciduous liana or scandent shrub that can climb high into the forest canopy. The stems are woody and often twisted. Leaves are opposite, simple, elliptic to ovate, and usually pale beneath, which is reflected in the species epithet albidum meaning “whitish”.

The flowers are borne in spikes or short inflorescences and are generally cream to yellowish-white. The fruits are winged, a characteristic feature of many species in the genus Combretum.

== Distribution and habitat ==
The species is distributed in India and Sri Lanka. In India it has been recorded from several regions including the Western Ghats, northeastern India, Odisha and parts of peninsular India.

It typically grows in semi-evergreen and moist deciduous forests, especially along river banks and forest margins.

== Ethnobotany ==
The species has been used in traditional medicine by indigenous communities in southern India. Tribal communities in the Chinnar region of Kerala have used extracts of the stem bark in the treatment of jaundice.

Pharmacognostic studies have reported the presence of tannins, flavonoids and triterpenes in the plant.

== Conservation ==
According to the Angiosperm Extinction Risk Predictions project referenced by Plants of the World Online, the species has been predicted as potentially threatened, although a formal assessment by the International Union for Conservation of Nature (IUCN) has not yet been completed.
