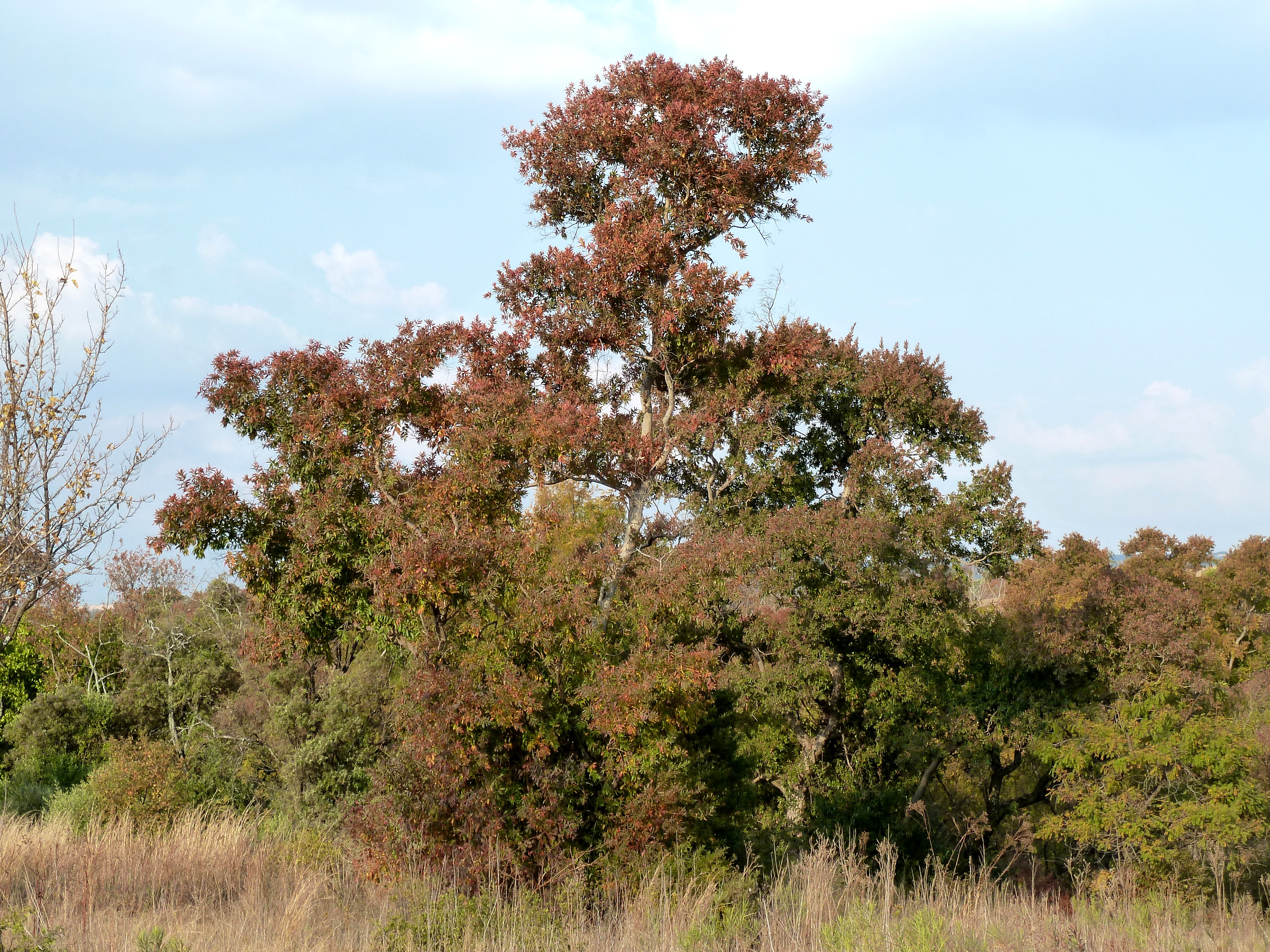
- In autumn colours at Tierpoort, Gauteng

Scientific classification
- Kingdom: Plantae
- Clade: Tracheophytes
- Clade: Angiosperms
- Clade: Eudicots
- Clade: Rosids
- Order: Myrtales
- Family: Combretaceae
- Genus: Combretum
- Species: C. erythrophyllum

Binomial name
- Combretum erythrophyllum (Burch.) Sond.

Synonyms
- C. glomeruliflorum Sond.; C. lydenburgianum Engl. & Diels; C. riparium Sond.; C. sonderi Gerrard ex Sond.

= Combretum erythrophyllum =

River bushwillow

Species of tree

Combretum erythrophyllum, commonly known as the river bushwillow, is a medium-sized, spreading tree found in bush near or along river banks in southern Africa. It is planted as a shade and ornamental tree in South Africa and the United States, and is propagated by seed.

== Common names ==
It is also known as the river combretum, and common names in other languages include riviervaderlandswilg (Afrikaans), umdubu (Zulu) and modubunoka / modubu (Setswana).

== Description ==
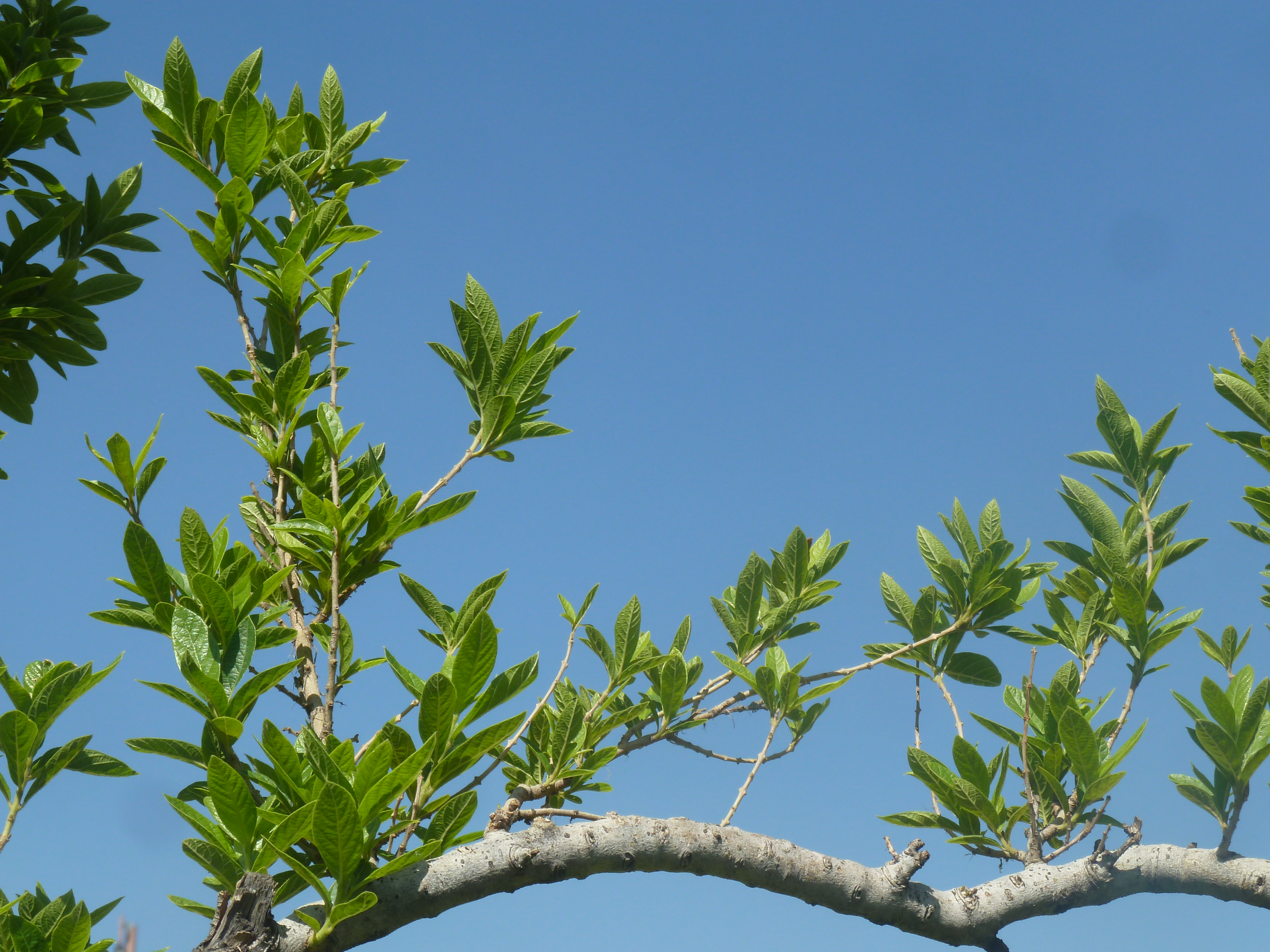
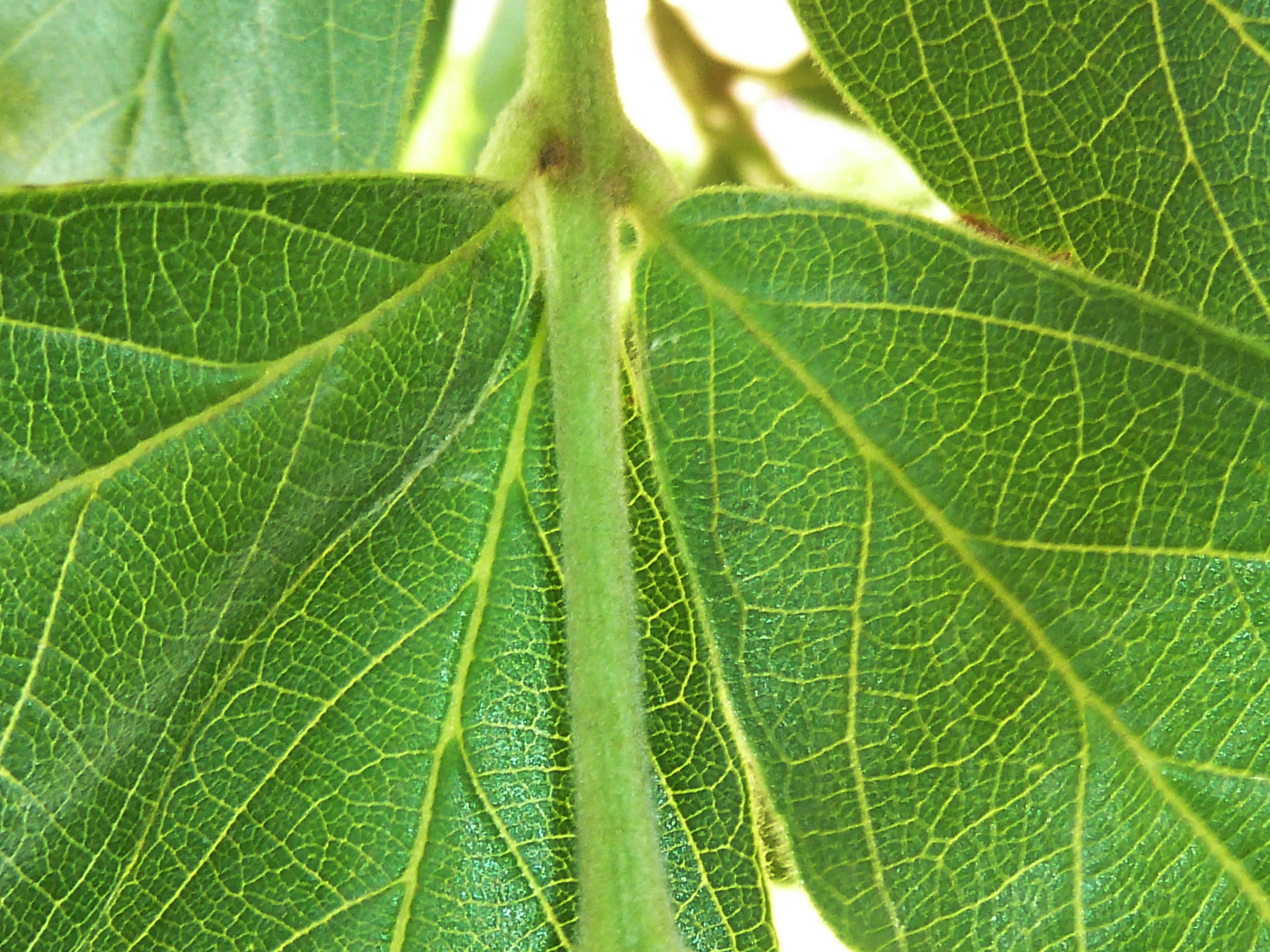
Leaves are subopposite or arranged in whorls of three

It is a small to medium-sized tree 7 to 12 m in height. It has a straight or multi-stemmed bole with a dense spreading crown. It is frost and drought hardy.

=== Bark and wood ===
The bark is a smooth pale gray or yellow brown that flakes with age to expose pale bark patches with large lumps (note: not galls) which sometimes occur on older trunks and main branches. The coarse wood shows little distinction between sapwood and heartwood.

=== Leaves ===
The leaves are simple, subopposite or in whorls of three, and elliptic with tapering base and apex (50 x 20 mm). The upper surface is usually without hairs, while the under surface has hairs. The petiole is short and stipules are absent. Inconspicuous scales cover both surfaces. The leaf's midrib and lateral veins are very conspicuous. It is deciduous to semi-deciduous, and the leaves turn yellow and red in autumn (the specific name erythrophyllum means red leaf).

=== Flowers ===
The cream or yellowish, bisexual flowers are produced in dense, rounded axillary spikes, about 10 cm in diameter and up to 3 cm long. They appear after the first leaves in spring or early summer.

=== Fruit ===
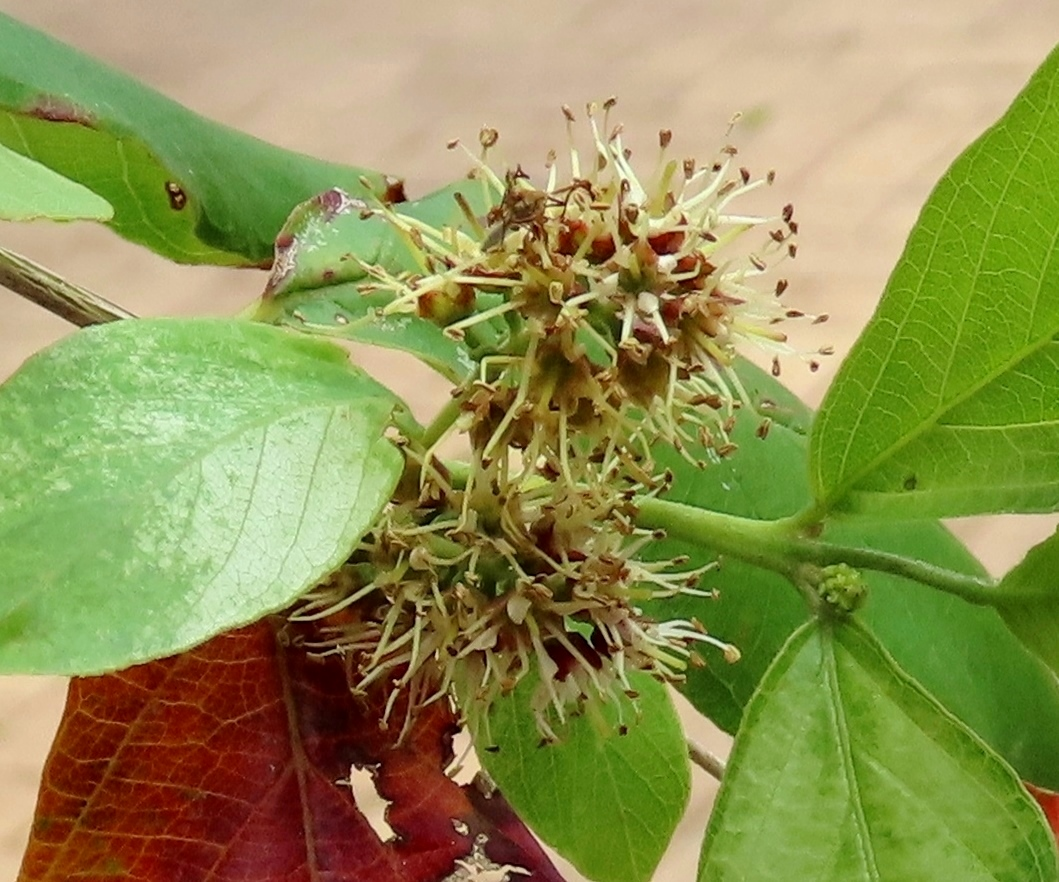
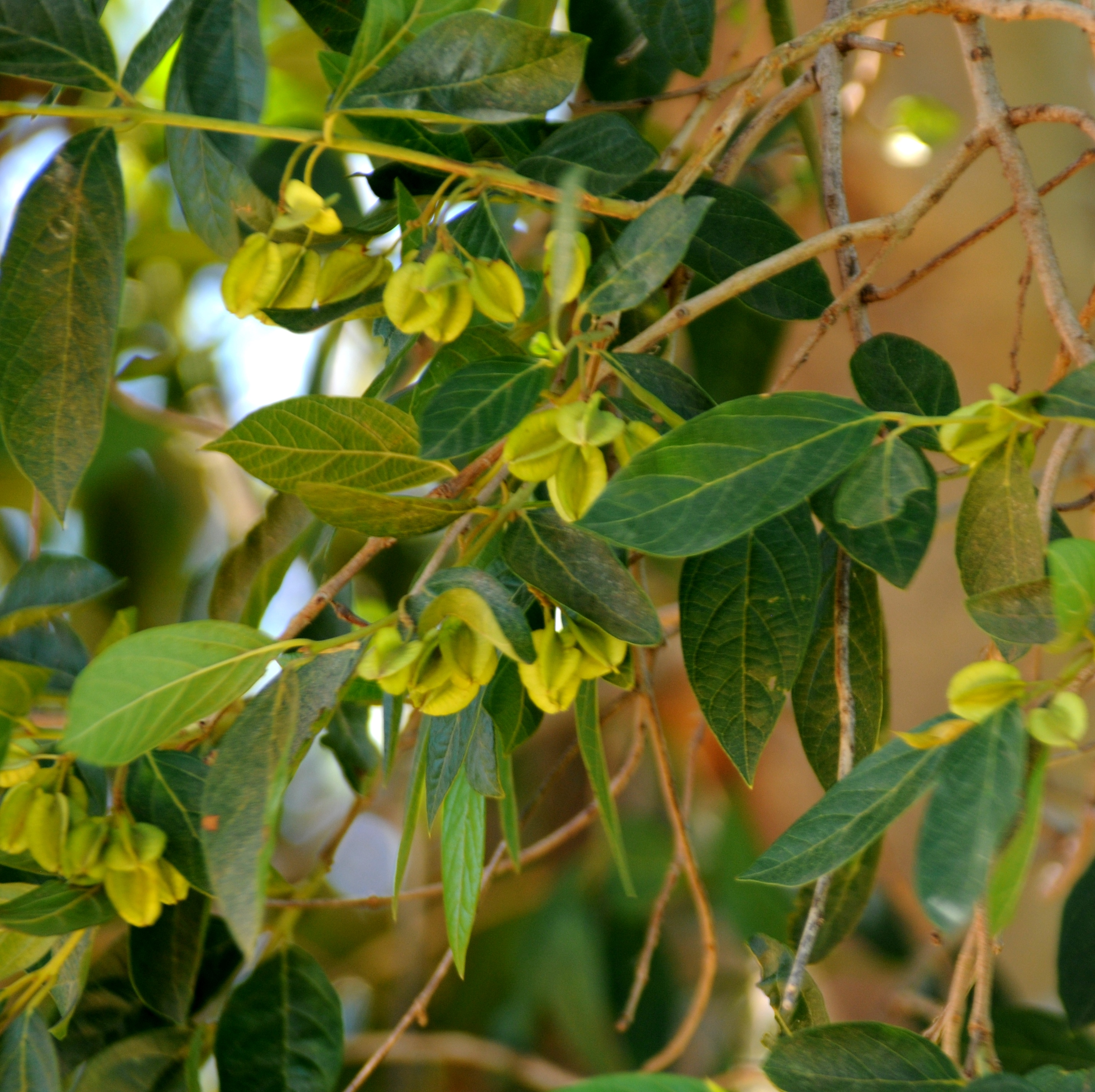
The inconspicuous flowers and smallish green samaras

The 4-winged fruit are yellow to brown in colour and 10 to 15 mm in length.

== Distribution ==
Found in riverine bush or where there is sufficient ground water in Botswana, Eswatini, Mozambique, South Africa, Zambia and Zimbabwe.

=== Ecology ===
Wasps lay their eggs in the walls of the fruit and the larvae feed on the seeds inside the fruit. The southern black tit taps the fruit to check if there are larvae inside, when discovered they open the fruit and eat the larvae. Combretum erythrophyllum leaves are browsed by giraffe, elephant, bushbuck and nyala.

== Medicinal uses ==
- The roots (regarded as poisonous) are used as a purgative and to treat venereal diseases.
- The bark is mixed with other herbs to make a decoction that is drunk in the morning and evening, quarter of a cup for sores.
- The fruit are regarded as poisonous and reputedly cause hiccups.
