= Combretum echirense =

Scientific classification
- Kingdom: Plantae
- Clade: Tracheophytes
- Clade: Angiosperms
- Clade: Eudicots
- Clade: Rosids
- Order: Myrtales
- Family: Combretaceae
- Genus: Combretum
- Species: C. echirense

Binomial name
- Combretum echirense Jongkind

Species of flowering plant

Combretum echirense is a species of flowering plant first formally named by C.C.H. Jongkind in 1993.
