= Combretum multinervium =

Scientific classification
- Kingdom: Plantae
- Clade: Tracheophytes
- Clade: Angiosperms
- Clade: Eudicots
- Clade: Rosids
- Order: Myrtales
- Family: Combretaceae
- Genus: Combretum
- Species: C. multinervium

Binomial name
- Combretum multinervium Exell

Species of plant

Combretum multinervium is a species of flowering plant in the bushwillow genus Combretum, family Combretaceae. It is native to tropical West Africa where it grows in Liberia, Ivory Coast, Ghana, Gabon and the Democratic Republic of the Congo.
