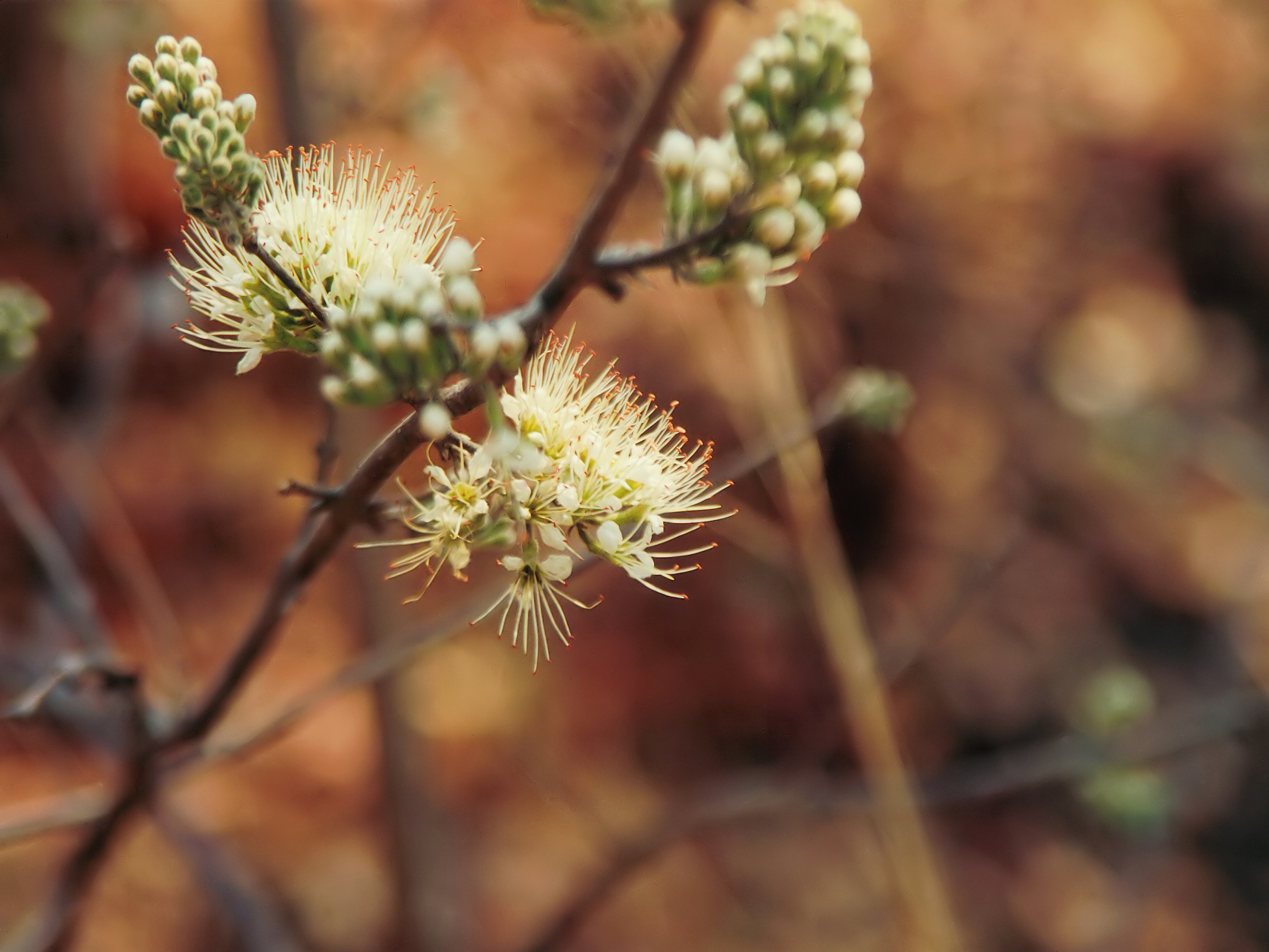
- Flowers of C. mossambicense

Scientific classification
- Kingdom: Plantae
- Clade: Tracheophytes
- Clade: Angiosperms
- Clade: Eudicots
- Clade: Rosids
- Order: Myrtales
- Family: Combretaceae
- Genus: Combretum
- Species: C. mossambicense

Binomial name
- Combretum mossambicense (Klotzsch) Engl.

= Combretum mossambicense =

Species of flowering plant

Combretum mossambicense is a climbing shrub occurring in Eastern Zambia, Zimbabwe and Mozambique.
