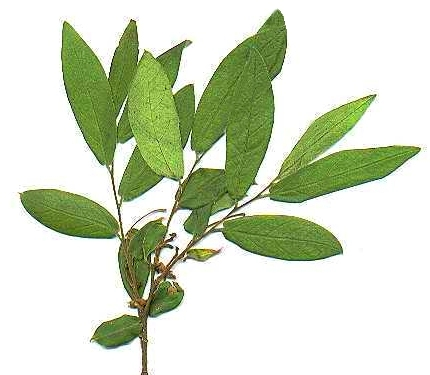
- Foliage

Conservation status
- Least Concern (IUCN 3.1)

Scientific classification
- Kingdom: Plantae
- Clade: Tracheophytes
- Clade: Angiosperms
- Clade: Eudicots
- Clade: Rosids
- Order: Myrtales
- Family: Combretaceae
- Genus: Combretum
- Species: C. edwardsii

Binomial name
- Combretum edwardsii Exell

= Combretum edwardsii =

Natal combretum

Species of flowering plant

Combretum edwardsii, the Natal combretum or forest climbing bushwillow, is an uncommon forest plant endemic to the mistbelt region of eastern South Africa. It has a climbing habit and the stems may often lie prostrate on the forest floor or on cliff tops. As with some other Combretum species the leaves assume autumn colours before they are shed. The plant flowers in spring and the 4-winged fruits reach maturity in late summer.
