= Combretum celastroides =

Scientific classification
- Kingdom: Plantae
- Clade: Tracheophytes
- Clade: Angiosperms
- Clade: Eudicots
- Clade: Rosids
- Order: Myrtales
- Family: Combretaceae
- Genus: Combretum
- Species: C. celastroides

Binomial name
- Combretum celastroides Welw. ex M.A. Lawson

Synonyms
- List: Combretum patelliforme Engl. & Diels

Species of plant

Combretum celastroides is a species of flowering plant in the bushwillow genus Combretum, family Combretaceae. It is found in Zambia, Zimbabwe, Botswana, and Namibia, and is also known in English as Jesse-bush bushwillow, Trailing bushwillow, or Zambezi jessebush, and in local languages as Mugalusaka and Umlalanyathi.
