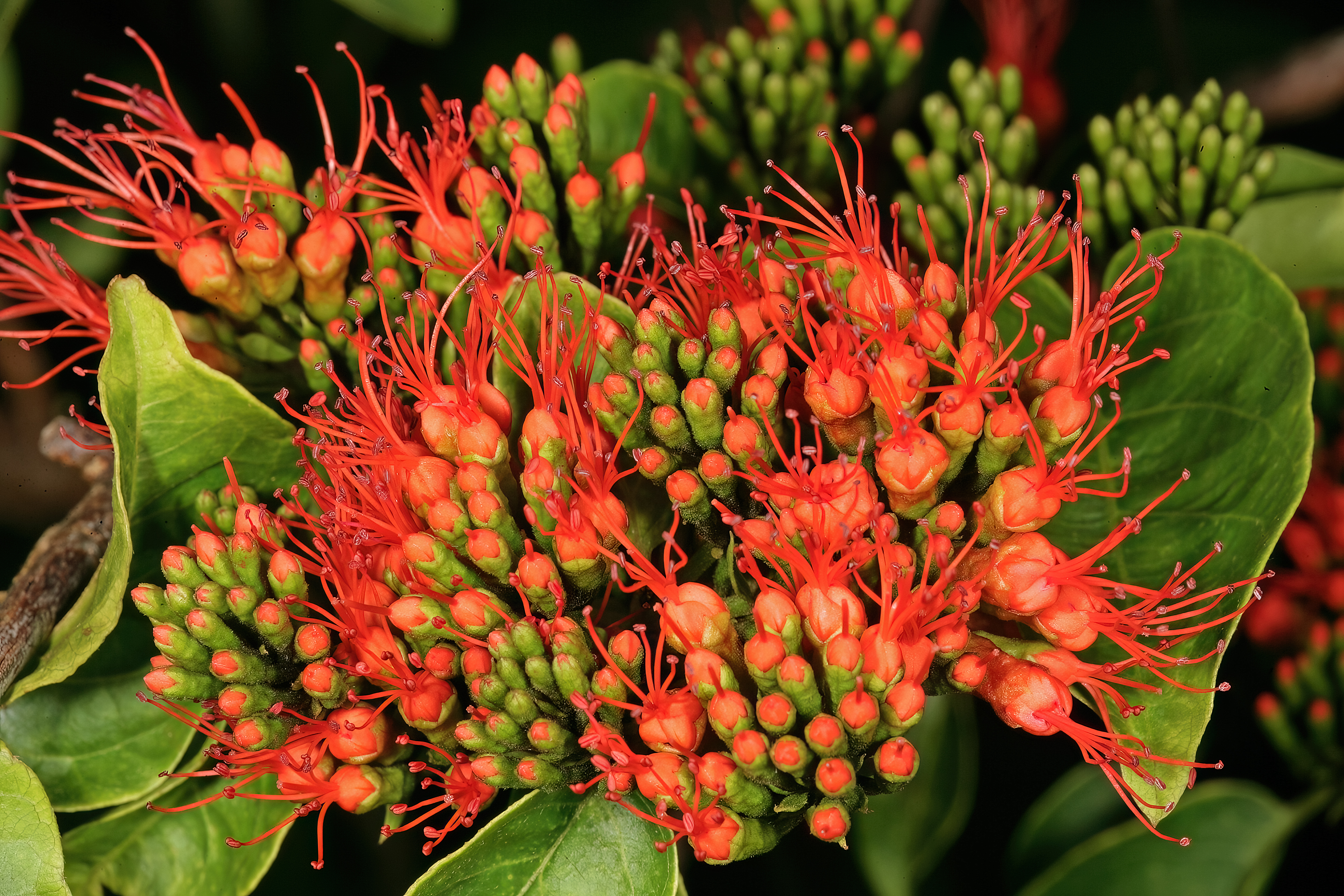
- Inflorescence

Scientific classification
- Kingdom: Plantae
- Clade: Tracheophytes
- Clade: Angiosperms
- Clade: Eudicots
- Clade: Rosids
- Order: Myrtales
- Family: Combretaceae
- Genus: Combretum
- Species: C. paniculatum

Binomial name
- Combretum paniculatum Vent.

= Combretum paniculatum =

Burning bush

Species of flowering plant

Combretum paniculatum, the burning bush or forest flame-creeper, is a plant species in the genus Combretum found in Africa. The fruit is a samara, i.e. a winged seed.

== Chemistry ==
The ethyl acetate extract of the leaf shows the presence of phenolic compounds (flavonoids, coumarins and tannins), sterols and alkaloids.

It produces a gum that is not recommended for food applications.
