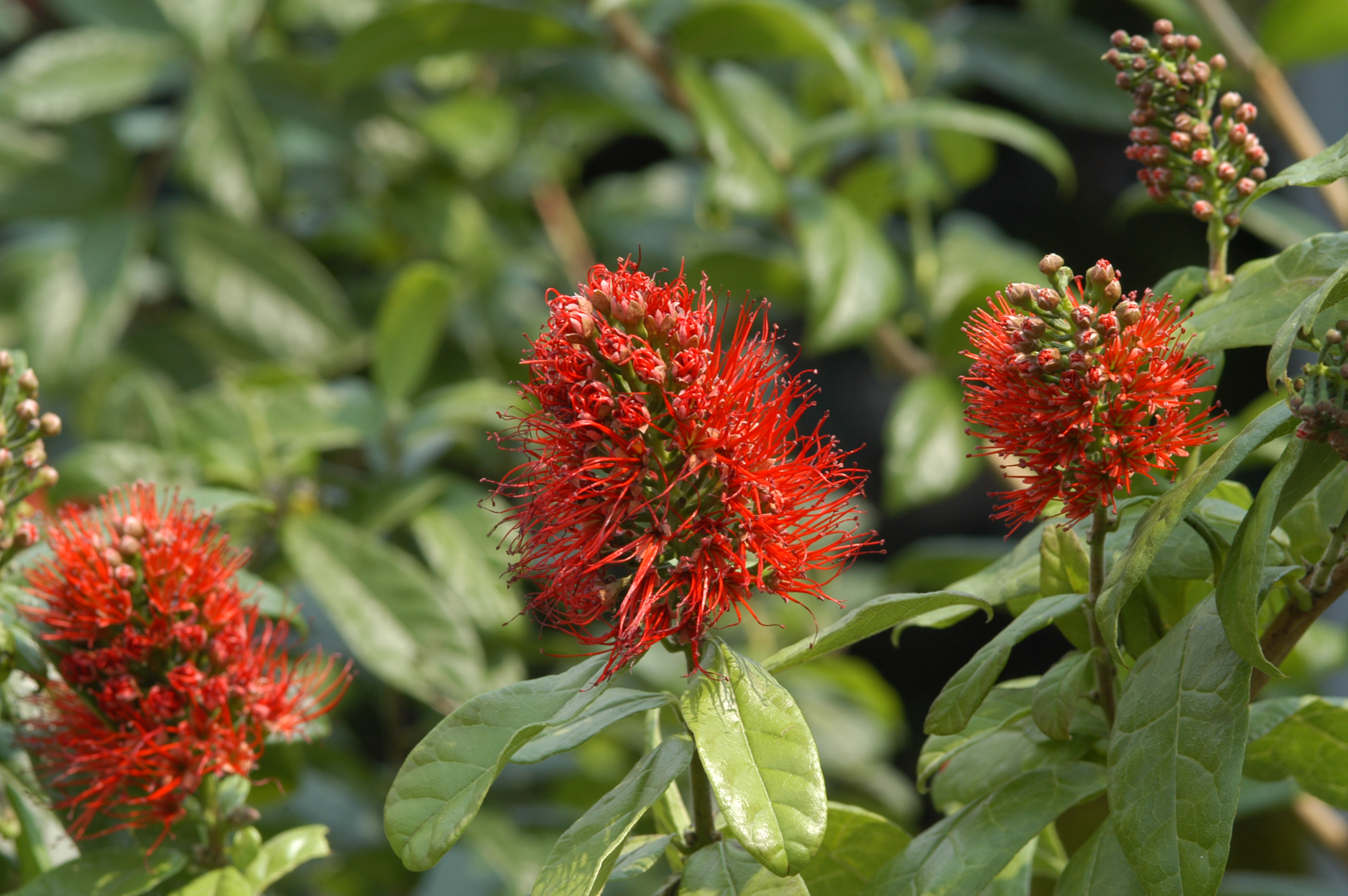

Scientific classification
- Kingdom: Plantae
- Clade: Tracheophytes
- Clade: Angiosperms
- Clade: Eudicots
- Clade: Rosids
- Order: Myrtales
- Family: Combretaceae
- Genus: Combretum
- Species: C. constrictum

Binomial name
- Combretum constrictum (Benth.) M.A.Lawson

= Combretum constrictum =

Species of tree

Combretum constrictum is a flowering tree species endemic to tropical Africa, within Afrotropic ecoregions.

Countries it is native to include: Kenya; Tanzania, Somalia, Mozambique, and Nigeria.
