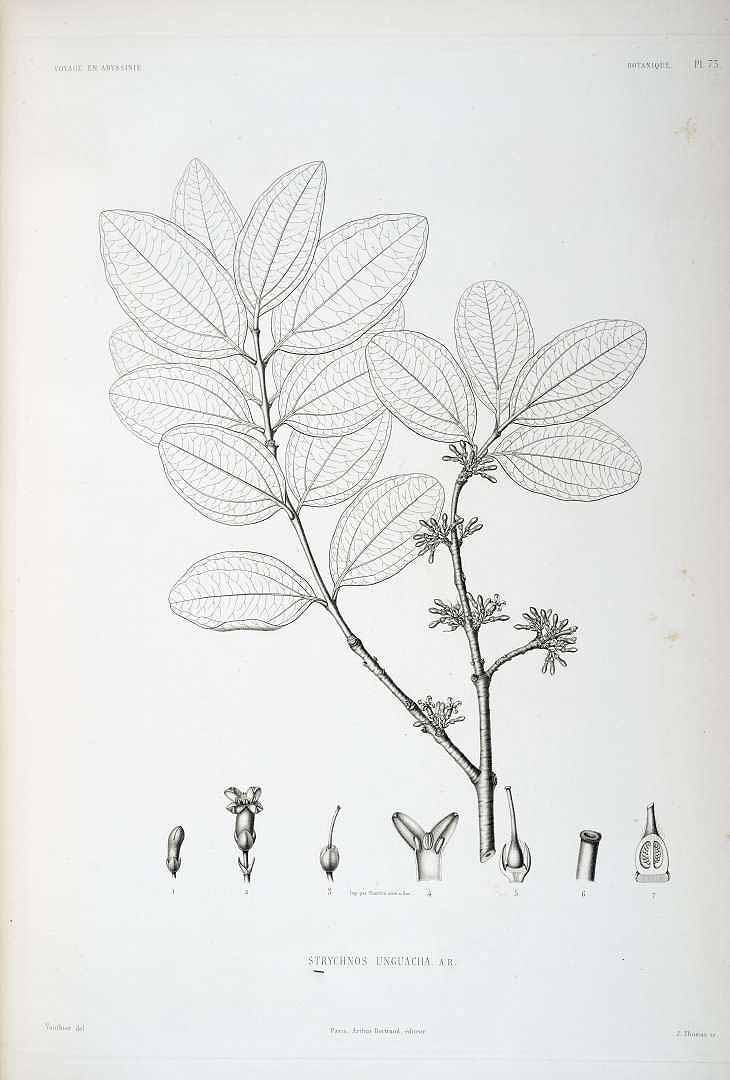
- Strychnos unguacha

Scientific classification
- Kingdom: Plantae
- Clade: Tracheophytes
- Clade: Angiosperms
- Clade: Eudicots
- Clade: Asterids
- Order: Gentianales
- Family: Loganiaceae
- Genus: Strychnos
- Species: S. icaja

Binomial name
- Strychnos icaja Henri Ernest Baillon

Synonyms
- Strychnos brachyura Gilg; Strychnos dewevrei Gilg; Strychnos dundusanensis De Wild.; Strychnos kipapa Gilg; Strychnos mildbraedii Gilg; Strychnos m'boundou Kauffeisen; Strychnos pusilliflora S.Moore; Strychnos venulosa Hutch. & M.B.Moss

= Strychnos icaja =

Species of plant

Strychnos icaja is a species belonging to the plant family Loganiaceae, native to West Tropical Africa. It is a very large, tropical rainforest liana which may attain a length of 100 m (330 ft).

== Taxonomy ==
The species was published in the journal Adansonia by Henri Ernest Baillon in the year 1879.

== Common names ==
Vernacular names in the various languages of Ubangi include mbondo in the Bantu language Lissongo, kpwili in Mbwaka and mbondo ou boundou in various other Bantu languages spoken in Gabon and the Democratic Republic of Congo.

== Description ==
A very large and stout liana, the trunk 10-15 cm in diameter snaking over the ground for some distance before climbing into the trees to a height of 30-40 m and then cascading in festoons, attached to their supporting trees by short tendrils resembling fish hooks. Bark of the branches greyish in colour, that of the subterranean roots mahogany-pink. Twigs of the flowering branches slender, glabrous, often bifurcated.
[Translated from the original French]

Large liana up to 100 m long, climbing with solitary tendrils; stem up to 15 cm in diameter; branchlets bearing solitary tendrils, dark green, glabrous. Leaves opposite, simple and entire; stipules absent; petiole 4–12 mm long, glabrous; blade ovate to elliptical, 5–15(–21) cm × 2–7(–10) cm, base cuneate to rounded, apex acuminate, glabrous, 3-veined from the base. Inflorescence a slender, rather open, lax, axillary thyrse 3–7 cm long, few-flowered to paniculate. Flowers minute, foetid, bisexual, regular, 4-merous; sepals fused at base, broadly ovate to almost orbicular, up to 1 mm long; corolla tube up to 1.5 mm long, lobes oblong to ovate or triangular, 1.5–2 mm long, acute, spreading, glabrous or hairy inside at base, greenish yellow or yellowish white; stamens inserted at the mouth of the corolla tube, exserted; ovary superior, globose, c. 0.5 mm in diameter, glabrous, 2-celled, style 0.5–1 mm long, stigma small, head-shaped. Fruit an ellipsoid or globose berry c. 2.5 cm × 3 cm, soft, dark yellow when ripe, 1-seeded. Seed ellipsoid, 16–21 mm × 15–20 mm × 9–15 mm, woolly hairy.

== Poison ==
The earliest reliable account of the use of the plant as both poison and entheogen is to be found in a short paper by Aubry-Lecomte of 1864, predating the publication of its scientific name by 15 years. The relevant passage runs as follows:

Monsieur Duchaillu has already spoken ( in a work well-received by those who have travelled in the interior of Gabon - despite its measure of exaggeration) of the effects of the poison M'boundou; the notes and specimens lately brought back from that country by Monsieur Griffon du Bellay, naval surgeon first class, confirm, on the whole, the description given by this traveller [Duchaillu]. The plant M'boundou belongs to the genus Strychnos of the family Loganiaceae, and the infusion of the reddish bark of its root is held by the natives of Cape Lopez to confer (upon him who does not die after having drunk it) the power of divination. Taken in small doses, it is said to be intoxicating and diuretic; but at a dose of half a bowl of grated root infused for half an hour in a bowl of water, it almost always proves lethal. However, the Ogangas (native healers) are considered to be immune to its effects; although they take care, it is true, to gulp down palm oil before drinking M'boundou, which attenuates the violence of the poison and facilitates its excretion via the urinary ducts; it is doubtless from accounts of this precaution that there derives the assertion of Monsieur Duchaillu that the surest sign that one undergoing the ordeal will survive it, is a frequent and involuntary passing of urine. The M'boundou of Cape Lopez is known in Gabon under the name of casa or icaja; but since the French occupation, it [the poison] is no longer administered to natives suspected of a crime, save in the most remote settlements and in the depths of the forests, where our authority can have no influence.
[Translated from the original French]

Chevalier's 1951 account of the use of S. icaja in the forests of the Ubangi River (Oubangui River) region provides additional information concerning the harvesting of the plant and an antidote employed in cases of poisoning by it:

The most famous ordeal poison of the dense forest is the Loganiaceous liana known to science as Strychnos icaja Baillon. It is found in the dense forests of the Oubangui (Lobaye basin) but is absent from the gallery forests and savannas of the region. Everything which we have related concerning the use of this plant in Gabon applies equally in Oubangui...It is above all young plants 1-2 m in height by 1-2 cm in diameter at the base which are used, the bark stripped from the stem a few cm above the juncture of stem and root and 10 cm of the root below it being macerated to be used as an ordeal poison or criminal poison. The [emetic] plant Kopi (Tetrorchidium didymostemon (Baill.) Pax & K. Hoffm., family Euphorbiaceae) serves as an antidote.
[Translated from the original French]

The plant has been used in divination and to prepare ordeal poisons and arrow poisons. Throughout Central Africa, a root or root bark infusion, or more rarely a stem bark extract, has been used as ordeal poison. Often roots of young plants were used, which seem to have a lower toxicity than those of mature plants. The root bark is an ingredient in arrow poison. In Côte d'Ivoire, Nigeria, and the Democratic Republic of Congo, whole plants, root bark, and fruits are used as a fish poison.

== Putative entheogen in the Bwiti religion ==
Roman Catholic missionary Alexandre Le Roy mentions briefly (as one of a series of examples of the initiation of youths into Gabonese secret societies of a religious nature) what appears to be entheogenic use of S. icaja:

Bwiti, which is the great fetish [see page Fetish priest] of the land, has its initiates in the area of Setté Cama [central Africa] and in other places. To be accepted into the secret society, the aspirant must first chew certain roots and drink a decoction of the bark of a tree which is known to botanists as Strychnos icaja. It does not take long for him to fall into a deep sleep and completely lose consciousness. Then a vine (Ipomoea spp.) is tied around his neck. Three days later, when he begins to recover, a magician will ask him to look into a piece of glass that is attached to the belly of Bwiti. He will see certain figures therein, about which he must report. If he says the correct things, he will be accepted; if not, this is taken as a sign that the fetish does not wish to reveal itself to him.

The passage above is of sufficient ethnobotanical interest to have been included both in an anthology by Hedwig Schleiffer and a more recent encyclopedia by Christian Rätsch.

== Traditional medicine ==
Strychnos icaja is used in traditional medicine; however, because of its toxicity the plant is usually only administered under the supervision of a traditional medicine man. In Ghana, an alcoholic extract of stem bark is taken for haemorrhoids. In the Central African Republic, the body is rubbed with a root bark maceration as a snake repellent. A very small dose of a maceration of the root bark is taken as an abortifacient and as an anthelmintic. In Gabon, a root decoction is taken as a diuretic or as an intoxicating drink. In Congo, a cold infusion of the root in palm wine is taken for gastrointestinal complaints and hernia. In the Democratic Republic of Congo, a preparation of the ground root bark mixed with palm oil is applied for skin diseases and itch. The ash of burnt twigs or roots is rubbed into scarifications of the forehead to treat insanity and malaria. A maceration of ground roots is used as an enema to treat sterility.

== Chemistry ==
Strychnos icaja contains, among other chemical compounds, saponins, iridoids, phenolic compounds, as well as a mixture of indole alkaloids. The root, stem and leaves contain a mixture of tertiary indole alkaloids of which strychnine and pseudostrychnine (12-hydroxystrychnine) are the main active principles. The roots contain dimeric tertiary alkaloids such as bisnordihydrotoxiferine and sungucine. They also contain quaternary alkaloids, such as N-strychninium. Strychnine is also the main alkaloid present in the fruits and seeds. Strychnos icaja could be used as a local source either of an extract or of a partially purified mixture of strychnine, 12-hydroxystrychnine, and other tertiary alkaloids. Sungucine and isosungucine exhibit antiplasmodial activities, but also show cytotoxic effects against human cancer cells. Pharmacological trials have demonstrated that the quaternary alkaloid fraction has pronounced antispasmodic activity. Furthermore, this fraction has a powerful cardiotoxic action which can lead to irreversible cardiac arrest.

Other alkaloids present in the leaves are the monomers protostrychnine, genostrychnine, and pseudostrychnine, the bisindolic alkaloid strychnogucine, and the trimeric indolomonoterpenic alkaloid strychnohexamine, which has antiplasmodial activity against Plasmodium falciparum. Strychnogucine and strychnohexamine have been isolated from the root bark. Saponins, iridoids, and phenolic compounds are also present in Strychnos icaja, but they probably have little activity relative to that of the alkaloids.
