= Combretastatin =

Names
- Preferred IUPAC name 5-[(2R)-2-Hydroxy-2-(3,4,5-trimethoxyphenyl)ethyl]-2-methoxyphenol
- Other names (R)-(−)-Combretastatin

Identifiers
CAS Number	82855-09-2
3D model (JSmol)	Interactive image
ChEMBL	ChEMBL151766
ChemSpider	297705
PubChem CID	9895264
UNII	7O62J06F18
CompTox Dashboard (EPA)	DTXSID80897571
- InChI: InChI=1/C18H22O6/c1-21-15-6-5-11(8-14(15)20)7-13(19)12-9-16(22-2)18(24-4)17(10-12)23-3/h5-6,8-10,13,19-20H,7H2,1-4H3 Key: LGZKGOGODCLQHG-UHFFFAOYAS
- SMILES: O(c1cc(cc(OC)c1OC)C(O)Cc2ccc(OC)c(O)c2)C

Properties
Chemical formula	C_{18}H_{22}O_{6}
Molar mass	334.36 g/mol
- Except where otherwise noted, data are given for materials in their standard state (at 25 °C [77 °F], 100 kPa). Infobox references

Combretastatin is a dihydrostilbenoid found in Combretum afrum.

== As a class ==
Combretastatins are a class of natural phenols. A variety of different natural combretastatin molecules are present in the bark of C. afrum, commonly known as South African Bush Willow. Despite having a similar name, combretastatins are unrelated to statins, a family of cholesterol lowering drugs.

== Natural combretastatins ==
Combretastatin A-4

Molecules that fall into the combretastatin family generally share 3 common structural features: a trimethoxy "A"-ring, a "B"-ring containing substituents often at C3' and C4', and [often] an ethene bridge between the two rings which provides necessary structural rigidity. Molecules with such an ethene bridge are also stilbenoids, molecules with a non-ethene bridge are dihydrostilbenoids.

Molecules with C3' amino and hydroxyl substituents are very active, and molecules with C4' hydroxyl or methoxy substituents are also cytotoxic. Of the natural products presently known combretastatin A-4 is the most potent in regards to both tubulin binding ability and cytotoxicity. Combretastatin A-1 is also a potent cytotoxic agent. Another molecule is combretastatin B-1.

== Biological function ==
=== In the plants that make it ===
It is thought to help protect the plant from pests and parasites.

=== In mammalian tumours ===
Members of the combretastatin family possess varying ability to cause vascular disruption in tumors. Combretastatin binds to the β-subunit of tubulin at what is called the colchicine site, referring to the previously discovered vascular disrupting agent colchicine. Inhibition of tubulin polymerization prevents cancer cells from producing microtubules. Microtubules are essential to cytoskeleton production, intercellular movement, cell movement, and formation of the mitotic spindle used in chromosome segregation and cellular division. The anti-cancer activity from this action results from a change in shape in vasculature endothelial cells. Endothelial cells treated with combretastatin rapidly balloon in shape causing a variety of effects which result in necrosis of the tumor core. The tumor edge is supported by normal vasculature and remains, for the most part, unaffected. As a result it is likely that any therapeutic use will involve a combination of drugs or treatment options.

== Chemical synthesis ==
A variety of possible routes to the combretastatin skeleton are possible. One reasonably easy synthesis is as follows:

- 1-Bromomethyl-3,4,5-trimethoxybenzene undergoes an S_{N}2 reaction with triphenylphosphine, which yields a phosphonium salt.
- This compound, through an ylide intermediate, is coupled to a benzaldehyde-derived B-ring possessing the desired substituents using a Wittig olefination.
- The Wittig reaction produces varying amounts of E and Z isomers depending mainly on solvent polarity, temperature, metal cation coordination effects, and the electronic effect of substituents on either the triphenylphosphine salt or the benzaldehyde. Generally cis-combretastatin possesses significantly improved ability to inhibit tubulin polymerization as well as cytotoxicity.

To directly generate the cis forms a Perkin condensation reaction can be used.

== Clinical studies ==
Combretastatin A-4, the most potent naturally occurring combretastatin known, its phosphate prodrug (CA-4-P), and other analogs of CA-4 such as ombrabulin are currently being investigated in a number of clinical trials.
