= Viper's grass =

Viper's grass or viper's-grass most commonly refers to many species in the genus Scorzonera:

- Dinebra retroflexa
- Scorzonera hispanica
- Scorzonera humilis
- Scorzonera judaica (Jordanian viper's grass or Judean viper's grass)

== See also ==
- Bidens campylotheca, viper beggarticks
- Echium, a flowering plant genus with some species known as viper's bugloss, particularly:
  - Echium plantagineum, purple viper's bugloss
  - Echium vulgare
  - Echium sabulicola, sand viper's gloss
- Maurandya barclayana, Mexican viper
- Pentalinon luteum, hammock viper's-tail
