= Dihydrostilbenoid =

Group of chemical compounds

Chemical structure of dihydro-resveratrol

Dihydrostilbenoids (bibenzyls) are natural phenols formed from the dihydrostilbene (bibenzyl) backbone.

== Examples ==
Dihydro-resveratrol is a natural phenol with a bibenzyl structure found in wine. It is also a metabolite of trans-resveratrol formed in the intestine by the hydrogenation of the double bond by microflora.

Combretastatin and combretastatin B-1 are two dihydrostilbenoids found in Combretum afrum, an African tree.

Isonotholaenic acid is another dihydrostilbenoid found in the Andean fern Argyrochosma nivea.

Bibenzyls (3,4'-dihydroxy-5,5'-dimethoxybibenzyl, 3,3'-dihydroxy-5-methoxybibenzyl (batatasin III)) can be found in the orchid Bulbophyllum vaginatum.

Bis(bibenzyls) and macrocyclic bis(benzyls) can be found in bryophytes, such as the compounds plagiochin E, 13,13'-O-isoproylidenericcardin D, riccardin H, marchantin E, neomarchantin A, marchantin A and marchantin B in the Chinese liverwort Marchantia polymorpha. Prenylated bibenzyls can be isolated from the New Zealand liverwort Marsupidium epiphytum or from Radula kojana.

One unique class of stilbenoid derivative was first isolated from Scorzonera humilis. They were named the tyrolobibenzyls after Tyrol in the eastern Alps, where the plant was collected.
