= Ramaliella =

Scientific classification
- Kingdom: Plantae
- Clade: Embryophytes
- Clade: Tracheophytes
- Clade: Spermatophytes
- Clade: Angiosperms
- Clade: Eudicots
- Clade: Asterids
- Order: Asterales
- Family: Asteraceae
- Subfamily: Cichorioideae
- Tribe: Cichorieae
- Subtribe: Scorzonerinae
- Genus: Ramaliella; Zaika, Sukhor. & N.Kilian (2020)

Species
- 9; see text

Genus of flowering plants

Ramaliella is a genus of flowering plants native to western Asia, ranging from Turkey southwards to the Sinai and Yemen, and eastwards to Uzbekistan, Kyrgyzstan, and Pakistan.

The species in the genus were formerly placed in genus Scorzonera, which was found to be polyphyletic in phylogenetic studies.

== Species ==
Nine species are accepted.

- Ramaliella acanthoclada (Franch.) Yıld.
- Ramaliella amasiana (Hausskn. & Bornm.) Yıld.
- Ramaliella intricata (Boiss.) Zaika, Sukhor. & N.Kilian
- Ramaliella koelpinioides (Rech.f.) Zaika, Sukhor. & N.Kilian
- Ramaliella longipapposa (Rech.f.) Zaika, Sukhor. & N.Kilian
- Ramaliella microcalathia (Rech.f.) E.Hatami, N.Kilian & K.E.Jones
- Ramaliella musilii (Velen.) Zaika, Sukhor. & N.Kilian
- Ramaliella polyclada (Rech.f. & Köie) Zaika, Sukhor. & N.Kilian
- Ramaliella tortuosissima (Boiss.) Zaika, Sukhor. & N.Kilian
