= Lai-Ming Ching =

New Zealand cellular biology academic

- Born: 23 September 1949 (age 77); Guangdong, China
- Education: University of Auckland
- Scientific career
- Fields: Cellular biology
- Thesis: Analysis of clones of cytotoxic lymphocytes (1978)
- Doctoral advisor: J. Marbrook
- Doctoral students: Kimiora Hēnare

Lai-Ming Ching is a leading New Zealand cellular biology academic. She is an Emeritus and Honorary Professor at the University of Auckland.

Much of Ching's research relates to the identification of potential anti-cancer drugs.

== Early Life ==
Lai-Ming Ching was born in Guangdong, China, and immigrated to New Zealand at the age of five. While she originally had aspirations to be a doctor, her parents vehemently resisted her relocating to study at the University of Otago which at the time hosted the country's only medical school. Ching's parents held a traditional view that university qualifications were not only superfluous for women but that overqualification may reduce her marriage prospects. Despite these struggles, she eventually studied at the University of Auckland, ultimately earning a PhD.

She is married to Brian Palmer, who was previously an Associate Professor at the University of Auckland.

== Academic career ==
Ching is believed to be the first Chinese woman to be awarded a PhD from a New Zealand university having produced a doctoral thesis titled 'Analysis of clones of cytotoxic lymphocytes' at the University of Auckland in 1978. After graduation, Ching had positions at the Ontario Cancer Institute in Toronto, and The University of Washington School of Medicine in Seattle, before she returned to New Zealand to join the Auckland Cancer Society Research Centre, University of Auckland. Ching's contributions to cancer research, particularly in the fields of oncology and immunotherapy were recognised in her appointment as the first full professor of Chinese descent at the University of Auckland Medical School.

Ching was a principal researcher in the preclinical development of DMXAA, later known as vadimezan or ASA404. Her research helped establish the immune and vascular mechanisms that supported its clinical development. DMXAA was subsequently licensed to Novartis and advanced to international Phase III trials for non-small-cell lung cancer. Ching also conducted preclinical research into inhibitors of the tumour-associates enzymes IDO1 and TDO2 and was a named inventor on University of Auckland patents covering these compounds. AT-0174 - a dual IDO1/TDO2 inhibitor developed from the patented compound family - subsequently entered a multi-centre Phase I trial in Australia for advanced solid tumours.

== Selected works ==
- Ching, Lai-Ming, and Bruce C. Baguley. "Induction of natural killer cell activity by the antitumour compound flavone acetic acid (NSC 347 512)." European Journal of Cancer and Clinical Oncology 23, no. 7 (1987): 1047–1050.
- Thomsen, Lindy L., Lai-Ming Ching, Li Zhuang, John B. Gavin, and Bruce C. Baguley. "Tumor-dependent increased plasma nitrate concentrations as an indication of the antitumor effect of flavone-8-acetic acid and analogues in mice." Cancer research 51, no. 1 (1991): 77–81.
- Roberts, Zachary J., Nadege Goutagny, Pin-Yu Perera, Hiroki Kato, Himanshu Kumar, Taro Kawai, Shizuo Akira et al. "The chemotherapeutic agent DMXAA potently and specifically activates the TBK1–IRF-3 signaling axis." Journal of Experimental Medicine 204, no. 7 (2007): 1559–1569.
- Thomsen, Lindy L., Lai-Ming Ching, and Bruce C. Baguley. "Evidence for the production of nitric oxide by activated macrophages treated with the antitumor agents flavone-8-acetic acid and xanthenone-4-acetic acid." Cancer research 50, no. 21 (1990): 6966–6970.
