= Crotaphatrema lamottei =

Conservation status
- Critically Endangered (IUCN 3.1)

Scientific classification
- Kingdom: Animalia
- Phylum: Chordata
- Class: Amphibia
- Order: Gymnophiona
- Clade: Apoda
- Family: Scolecomorphidae
- Genus: Crotaphatrema
- Species: C. lamottei

Binomial name
- Crotaphatrema lamottei (Nussbaum, 1981)
- Crotaphatrema lamottei is only known from Mount Oku, Cameroon

Synonyms
- Scolecomorphus lamottei Nussbaum, 1981

Species of amphibian

Crotaphatrema lamottei, the Mount Oku caecilian or Lamotte's caecilian, is a species of caecilian in the family Scolecomorphidae. It is endemic to Mount Oku in Cameroon. The specific name lamottei honours Maxime Lamotte, French biologist. There is some doubt whether Crotaphatrema tchabalmbaboensis really is distinct from this species.

== Description ==
Males measure 143–281 mm (5.6–11.1 in) and adult females 262–325 mm (10.3–12.8 in) in total length. The mid-body width varies between 5.1 and 11.5 mm (0.20 and 0.45 in). There are 115–129 primary annuli that are incomplete ventrally. The eyes are not externally visible. The dorsum is tan-brown in preservative and sienna brown and pale lilac in life. The venter is cream. The lateral margins of the upper jaws and the area surrounding tentacular apertures are cream. The tip of the snout is tan-brown.

== Habitat and conservation ==
Crotaphatrema lamottei is found in secondary forest, forest edges, and farmland, but never further than 500 m (1,600 ft) away from forest. It occurs at about 2,300 m (7,500 ft) above sea level. It is assumed to be oviparous and not to depend on water bodies for reproduction.

Crotaphatrema lamottei has a low population density and restricted distribution, although its exact range remains poorly mapped. Agriculture, grazing, fire, and forest fragmentation threaten natural habitats at Mount Oku, but it is not known how these changes affect this particular species. It is sometimes killed by local people, perhaps because of being confused with snakes. Some habitat at Mount Oku is protected.
