= Scorzonera judaica =

Scientific classification
- Kingdom: Plantae
- Clade: Embryophytes
- Clade: Tracheophytes
- Clade: Angiosperms
- Clade: Eudicots
- Clade: Asterids
- Order: Asterales
- Family: Asteraceae
- Genus: Scorzonera
- Species: S. judaica

Binomial name
- Scorzonera judaica Eig

Synonyms
- List: Gelasia psychrophila (Boiss. & Hausskn.) Zaika, Sukhor. & N.Kilian; Scorzonera psychrophila Boiss. & Hausskn.; Scorzonera pseudolanata Grossh.; Scorzonera persica Boiss. & Buhse; Bocquetia lanata (L.) Yild.; Lasiospora lanata (L.) Fisch. & C.A.Mey.; Leontodon lanatus L.; Scorzonera czerepanovii Kamelin; Scorzonera lanata var. latifolia Bornm.; Scorzonera vaginata Bertol.; Tragopogon lanatus (L.) L.; Troximon lanatum (L.) F.W.Schmidt

Species of flowering plant in the daisy family

Scorzonera judaica, commonly called Jordanian viper's grass, Judean viper's grass, or what was earlier known as salsify, is a species of geophyte of the family Asteraceae with yellow flowers. It is native to the eastern Mediterranean as far as Afghanistan.

== Description ==
Scorzonera judaica is a perennial herbaceous plant with a cylindrical rhizome ending in a globose tuber. The rosette of leaves grows immediately following the first rains. The leaves are elongated, glossy and narrow, and covered with long white hairs that resemble spider webs. The flower spikes and the involucral bracts of the inflorescence are also covered with hairs.

Growing from the rosette, the flower spikes reach 8–10 centimetres (3 1/4–4 in) long. They bloom between January and April (in Israel). The yellow petals are connate and tongue-shaped.

The seeds are hairy all over and have a feathery tuft. Upon ripening, they immediately disperse in the wind, looking like dancing cotton balls.

== Distribution and habitat ==
Scorzonera judaica has a broad geographical area, stretching from the sub-desert and steppe regions of the western part of the Irano-Turanian Region: Anatolia, Transcaucasus, Syria, Israel, Jordan, northern Egypt, Iraq, Iran and Afghanistan. It is the only species of its genus that thrives in desert regions, with all other similar species growing in high mountainous elevations in the Middle East and in Asia. In Israel, it typically grows on the slopes of the Judean Desert and in the northern Negev.

== Ecology ==
Scorzonera judaica is one of eighteen species of geophytes and hemicryptophytes that were found to be consumed by porcupines in the Negev Desert highlands.

== Uses ==
The taproots of this herb are edible and eaten raw when young, but in age they require either cooking or roasting first. In the autumn of the first or second year, the roots can be prepared by being thoroughly rinsed, sectioned and boiled in salt water for a few minutes, then sautéed in a frying pan with a dash of olive oil. A palatable soup can be made from 20 roasted corms, flavored with spring onions, olive oil and a dash of salt.

== Additional reading ==
- Bader A., De Tommasi N., Cotugno R., Braca, A. (2011). "Phenolic compounds from the roots of Jordanian viper's grass, Scorzonera judaica", Journal of Natural Products 74(6), pp. 1421–1426
- Shelef, Oren; Guy, Ofer; Solowey, Elaine; Kam, Michael; Degen, A. Allen; Rachmilevitch, Shimon (2016). "Domestication of plants for sustainable agriculture in drylands: Experience from the Negev Desert". Arid Land Research and Management. 30 (2). Taylor & Francis Online: 209–228. doi:10.1080/15324982.2015.1089954.
