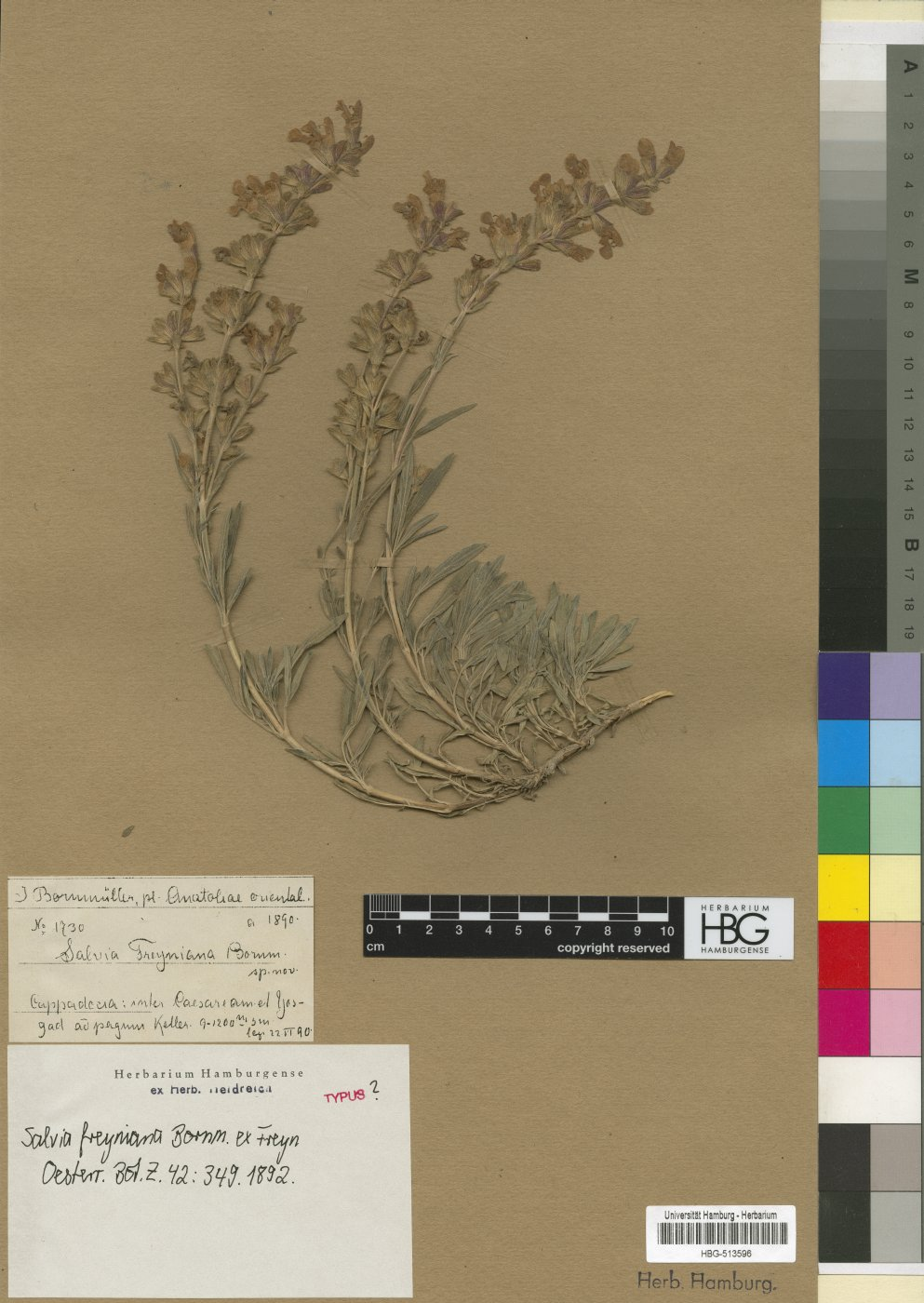

Scientific classification
- Kingdom: Plantae
- Clade: Tracheophytes
- Clade: Angiosperms
- Clade: Eudicots
- Clade: Asterids
- Order: Lamiales
- Family: Lamiaceae
- Genus: Salvia
- Species: S. freyniana

Binomial name
- Salvia freyniana Bornm.

= Salvia freyniana =

Species of flowering plant

Salvia freyniana is a critically endangered perennial plant that is endemic to Turkey, growing in sandy soil at 900 to 1,200 m (3,000 to 3,900 ft) elevation. It was first collected in 1890, described in 1892 by Joseph Friedrich Nicolaus Bornmüller and not discovered again until 2006. During field trips as part of a revision and study of Salvia species in Turkey, an unusual population of Salvia was discovered which was eventually shown to be the plant described by Bornmueller. It was the first collection of the plant since the original specimens in 1890.

S. freyniana grows on many ascending to erect stems to 15 to 35 cm (5.9 to 13.8 in). The inflorescence is of 3-6 flowered verticillasters, with a lilac-blue corolla with a white center, 10 to 18 mm (0.39 to 0.71 in) long, flowering from May–June. It is closely related to Salvia wiedemannii Boiss.
