= Combretastatin B-1 =

Names
- Preferred IUPAC name 3-Methoxy-6-[2-(3,4,5-trimethoxyphenyl)ethyl]benzene-1,2-diol
- Other names Combretastatin B1

Identifiers
CAS Number	109971-64-4
3D model (JSmol)	Interactive image; Interactive image
ChemSpider	119539
PubChem CID	135716
UNII	NK47TS5H6V
CompTox Dashboard (EPA)	DTXSID40149083
- InChI: InChI=1S/C18H22O6/c1-21-13-8-7-12(16(19)17(13)20)6-5-11-9-14(22-2)18(24-4)15(10-11)23-3/h7-10,19-20H,5-6H2,1-4H3 Key: ZSNYQENLWQYSRK-UHFFFAOYSA-N; InChI=1/C18H22O6/c1-21-13-8-7-12(16(19)17(13)20)6-5-11-9-14(22-2)18(24-4)15(10-11)23-3/h7-10,19-20H,5-6H2,1-4H3 Key: ZSNYQENLWQYSRK-UHFFFAOYAW
- SMILES: COC1=C(C(=C(C=C1)CCC2=CC(=C(C(=C2)OC)OC)OC)O)O; O(c1cc(cc(OC)c1OC)CCc2ccc(OC)c(O)c2O)C

Properties
Chemical formula	C_{18}H_{22}O_{6}
Molar mass	334.368 g·mol^{−1}
- Except where otherwise noted, data are given for materials in their standard state (at 25 °C [77 °F], 100 kPa). Infobox references

Combretastatin B-1 is a combretastatin and a dihydrostilbenoid. It can be found in Combretum afrum, the Eastern Cape South African bushwillow tree or in Combretum kraussii, the forest bushwillow.

It can be produced by selective hydrogenation of combretastatin A-1.

It is a potent inhibitor of microtubule assembly in vitro.
