= Canniprene =

Names
- Preferred IUPAC name 3-[2-(3-Hydroxy-5-methoxyphenyl)ethyl]-6-methoxy-2-(3-methylbut-2-en-1-yl)phenol

Identifiers
CAS Number	70677-47-3
3D model (JSmol)	Interactive image
ChEMBL	ChEMBL4082457
ChemSpider	26538044
PubChem CID	53439651
UNII	95QD8NF292
CompTox Dashboard (EPA)	DTXSID30702065
- InChI: InChI=1S/C21H26O4/c1-14(2)5-9-19-16(8-10-20(25-4)21(19)23)7-6-15-11-17(22)13-18(12-15)24-3/h5,8,10-13,22-23H,6-7,9H2,1-4H3 Key: NGQFSSVGVDXEOE-UHFFFAOYSA-N
- SMILES: CC(=CCC1=C(C=CC(=C1O)OC)CCC2=CC(=CC(=C2)OC)O)C

Properties
Chemical formula	C_{21}H_{26}O_{4}
Molar mass	342.435 g·mol^{−1}
- Except where otherwise noted, data are given for materials in their standard state (at 25 °C [77 °F], 100 kPa). Infobox references

Canniprene (C_{21}H_{26}O_{4}) is an isoprenylated bibenzyl found in the fan leaves of Cannabis sativa. Canniprene can be vaporized and therefore potentially inhaled from cannabis.
