= Carex eriocarpa =

Scientific classification
- Kingdom: Plantae
- Clade: Tracheophytes
- Clade: Angiosperms
- Clade: Monocots
- Clade: Commelinids
- Order: Poales
- Family: Cyperaceae
- Genus: Carex
- Species: C. eriocarpa

Binomial name
- Carex eriocarpa Hausskn. & Kük., 1903

Species of sedge

Carex eriocarpa is a tussock-forming perennial in the family Cyperaceae. It is native to parts of Turkey.

== See also ==
- List of Carex species
