= Allium sieheanum =

Conservation status
- Least Concern (IUCN 3.1)

Scientific classification
- Kingdom: Plantae
- Clade: Tracheophytes
- Clade: Angiosperms
- Clade: Monocots
- Order: Asparagales
- Family: Amaryllidaceae
- Subfamily: Allioideae
- Genus: Allium
- Species: A. sieheanum

Binomial name
- Allium sieheanum Hausskn. ex Kollmann

Species of plant

Allium sieheanum is a species of flowering plant in the family Amaryllidaceae, native to central Anatolia. A bulbous geophyte, it is typically found in wetlands and grassy areas at elevations from 900 to 1,200 m (3,000 to 3,900 ft). It is a halophyte.
