= Lepidotrichum =

Scientific classification
- Kingdom: Plantae
- Clade: Tracheophytes
- Clade: Angiosperms
- Clade: Eudicots
- Clade: Rosids
- Order: Brassicales
- Family: Brassicaceae
- Tribe: Alysseae
- Genus: Lepidotrichum; Velen. & Bornm.
- Species: L. uechtritzianum

Binomial name
- Lepidotrichum uechtritzianum (Bornm.) Velen.

Synonyms
- Aurinia uechtritziana (Bornm.) Cullen & T.R.Dudley; Ptilotrichum uechtriizianum Bornm. (1888) (basionym)

Genus of flowering plants

Lepidotrichum is a genus of flowering plants in the family Brassicaceae. It includes a single species, Lepidotrichum uechtritzianum, a subshrub native to eastern Bulgaria, European Turkey, and northern Asiatic Turkey.
