= Astragalus xiphidiopsis =

Scientific classification
- Kingdom: Plantae
- Clade: Tracheophytes
- Clade: Angiosperms
- Clade: Eudicots
- Clade: Rosids
- Order: Fabales
- Family: Fabaceae
- Subfamily: Faboideae
- Genus: Astragalus
- Species: A. xiphidiopsis

Binomial name
- Astragalus xiphidiopsis Bornm.

Species of flowering plant

Astragalus xiphidiopsis is a species of flowering plant in the family Fabaceae.

== Taxonomy ==
The species was first described by Joseph Friedrich Nicolaus Bornmüller in 1941. The type specimen repository is in the Berlin Botanical Garden and Botanical Museum.

== Distribution ==
The species is native to the temperate regions of Western Iran.

== Description ==
Astragalus xiphidiopsis is a perennial.
