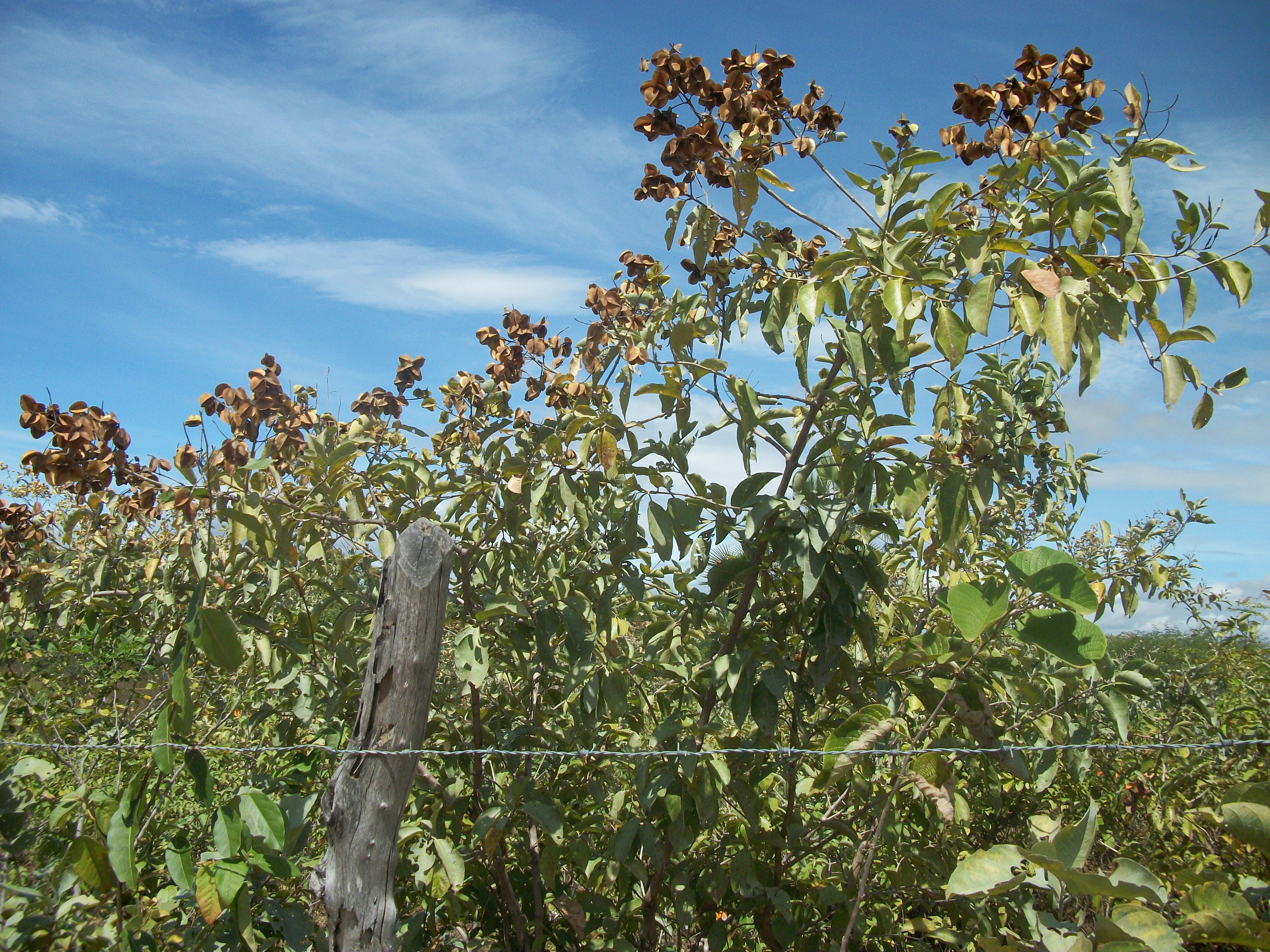

Scientific classification
- Kingdom: Plantae
- Clade: Tracheophytes
- Clade: Angiosperms
- Clade: Eudicots
- Clade: Rosids
- Order: Myrtales
- Family: Combretaceae
- Genus: Combretum
- Species: C. leprosum

Binomial name
- Combretum leprosum Mart.

Synonyms
- Combretum hassleranum Chodat; Combretum leptostachyum Mart.

= Combretum leprosum =

Species of flowering plant

Combretum leprosum, the mofumbo in Portuguese and the asucaró in eastern Bolivian Spanish, is a plant species in the genus Combretum found throughout the Amazon Basin.

This plant contains combretastatin A-4.

Across much of rural eastern Bolivia, communities have long preserved and promoted the growth of these trees, valuing them primarily for the shade they provide.
