= Dihydro-resveratrol =

Names
- Preferred IUPAC name 5-[2-(4-Hydroxyphenyl)ethyl]benzene-1,3-diol
- Other names Dihydroresveratrol

Identifiers
CAS Number	58436-28-5
3D model (JSmol)	Interactive image
ChEBI	CHEBI:4582
ChemSpider	161607
ECHA InfoCard	100.122.692
KEGG	C10255
PubChem CID	185914
UNII	CBY43AY0TT
CompTox Dashboard (EPA)	DTXSID60973983
- InChI: InChI=1S/C14H14O3/c15-12-5-3-10(4-6-12)1-2-11-7-13(16)9-14(17)8-11/h3-9,15-17H,1-2H2 Key: HITJFUSPLYBJPE-UHFFFAOYSA-N
- SMILES: C1=CC(=CC=C1CCC2=CC(=CC(=C2)O)O)O

Properties
Chemical formula	C_{14}H_{14}O_{3}
Molar mass	230.263 g·mol^{−1}
- Except where otherwise noted, data are given for materials in their standard state (at 25 °C [77 °F], 100 kPa). Infobox references

Dihydro-resveratrol is a dihydrostilbenoid found in wine. It is also a metabolite of trans-resveratrol formed in the intestine by the hydrogenation of the double bond by microflora. It is also a non-cannabinoid estrogenic compound found in cannabis.
