= Bornmuellera =

Scientific classification
- Kingdom: Plantae
- Clade: Tracheophytes
- Clade: Angiosperms
- Clade: Eudicots
- Clade: Rosids
- Order: Brassicales
- Family: Brassicaceae
- Genus: Bornmuellera; Hausskn.

Synonyms
- Leptoplax O.E.Schulz; Physocardamum Hedge

Genus of flowering plants

Bornmuellera is a genus of flowering plants belonging to the family Brassicaceae. Its native range is Albania, Greece, former Yugoslavia, and Asiatic Turkey.

== Species ==
Nine species are accepted.

- Bornmuellera angustifolia (Hausskn. ex Bornm.) Cullen & T.R.Dudley
- Bornmuellera baldaccii (Degen) Heywood
- Bornmuellera cappadocica (Willd.) Cullen & T.R.Dudley
- Bornmuellera davisii (Hedge) Reetnik
- Bornmuellera dieckii Degen
- Bornmuellera emarginata (Boiss.) Reetnik
- Bornmuellera glabrescens (Boiss.) Cullen & T.R.Dudley
- Bornmuellera kiyakii Aytaç & A.Aksoy
- Bornmuellera × petri Greuter., Charpin & Dittrich
- Bornmuellera tymphaea (Hausskn.) Hausskn.
