= Vascular-targeting agent =

Class of anti-cancer drugs

A vascular-targeting agent (VTA) or vascular disrupting agent (VDA) is a drug designed to damage the vasculature (blood vessels) of cancer tumors causing central necrosis.

VTAs can be small-molecule or ligand-based.

Small-molecule VTAs include:

- microtubule destabilizing drugs such as combretastatin A-4 disodium phosphate (CA4P), ZD6126, AVE8062, Oxi 4503
- vadimezan (ASA404)

== Clinical trials ==
Phase II : ZD6126, CA4P, plinabulin (NPI-2358)

Phase III : DMXAA (ASA404).
