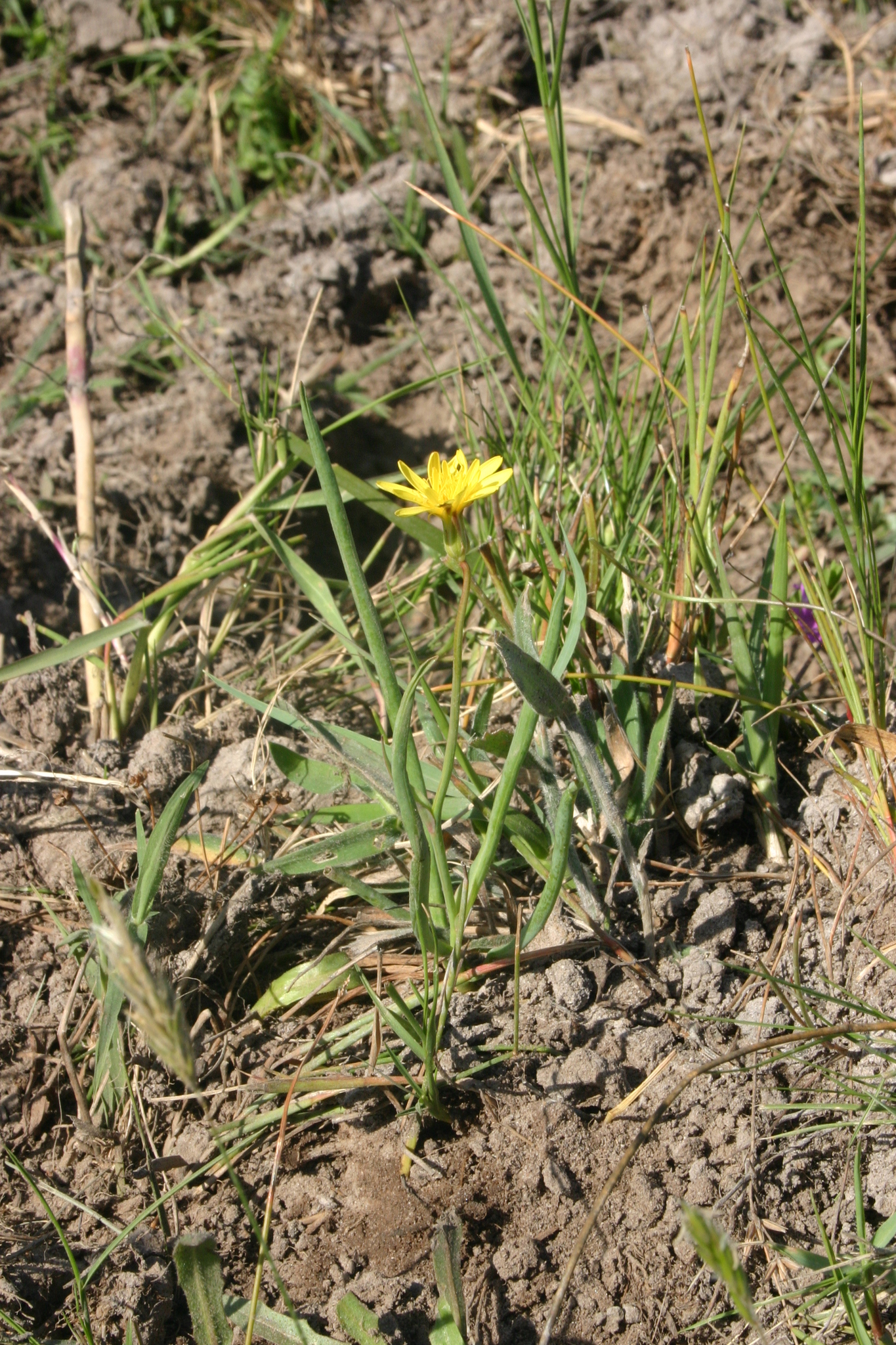

Conservation status
- Critically Endangered (IUCN 3.1)

Scientific classification
- Kingdom: Plantae
- Clade: Tracheophytes
- Clade: Angiosperms
- Clade: Eudicots
- Clade: Asterids
- Order: Asterales
- Family: Asteraceae
- Genus: Scorzonera
- Species: S. fistulosa

Binomial name
- Scorzonera fistulosa Brot.

Synonyms
- Avellara fistulosa (Brot.) Blanca & C.Díaz

= Scorzonera fistulosa =

Genus of flowering plants

Scorzonera fistulosa is a species of flowering plants in the dandelion family Asteraceae, native to Spain and Portugal. As Avellara fistulosa, it was the only species in the genus Avellara.
