= Combretastatin A-4 =

Names
- Preferred IUPAC name 2-Methoxy-5-[(1Z)-2-(3,4,5-trimethoxyphenyl)ethen-1-yl]phenol
- Other names Combretastatin A4; CA-4; 1-(3,4,5-Trimethoxyphenyl)-2-(3′-hydroxy-4′-methoxyphenyl)ethene; 3,4,5-Trimethoxy-3′-hydroxy-4′-methoxystilbene

Identifiers
CAS Number	117048-59-6
3D model (JSmol)	Interactive image
ChEMBL	ChEMBL67
ChemSpider	4508364
ECHA InfoCard	100.159.667
PubChem CID	5351344
UNII	16U6OP69RQ
CompTox Dashboard (EPA)	DTXSID101025983
- InChI: InChI=1S/C18H20O5/c1-20-15-8-7-12(9-14(15)19)5-6-13-10-16(21-2)18(23-4)17(11-13)22-3/h5-11,19H,1-4H3/b6-5- Key: HVXBOLULGPECHP-WAYWQWQTSA-N
- SMILES: COC1=C(C=C(C=C1)C=CC2=CC(=C(C(=C2)OC)OC)OC)O

Properties
Chemical formula	C_{18}H_{20}O_{5}
Molar mass	316.34 g/mol
Melting point	116 °C (241 °F; 389 K)
Solubility in water	insoluble
Solubility in DMSO, Ethanol	DMSO : 63 mg/mL, Ethanol : 34 mg/mL
- Except where otherwise noted, data are given for materials in their standard state (at 25 °C [77 °F], 100 kPa). verify (what is ?) Infobox references

Combretastatin A-4 is a combretastatin and a stilbenoid. It can be isolated from Combretum afrum, the Eastern Cape South African bushwillow tree or in Combretum leprosum, the mofumbo, a species found in Brazil.

== Function ==
Tubulin represents a potent target in cancer chemotherapy, given its role in cell division. Combretastatin is a naturally occurring well known tubulin polymerization inhibitor. Combretastatin A-4 comes in two stereoisomers (cis (shown top right), and trans); The cis form binds much better to the 'colchicine' site on tubulin to inhibit polymerization.

== Derivatives ==
Combretastatin A-4 is the active component of combretastatin A-4 phosphate, a prodrug designed to damage the vasculature (blood vessels) of cancer tumors causing central necrosis.

A large number of synthetic derivatives have been reported, including beta-lactam based compounds.

== Pharmacokinetics ==
CA4 has a half life of 1.8-4.2h in humans. CA4P(a prodrug) has a half life of 0.22-0.36h in humans.

== See also ==
- Ombrabulin, a combretastatin A-4 derivative in clinical trials for treatment of cancer
