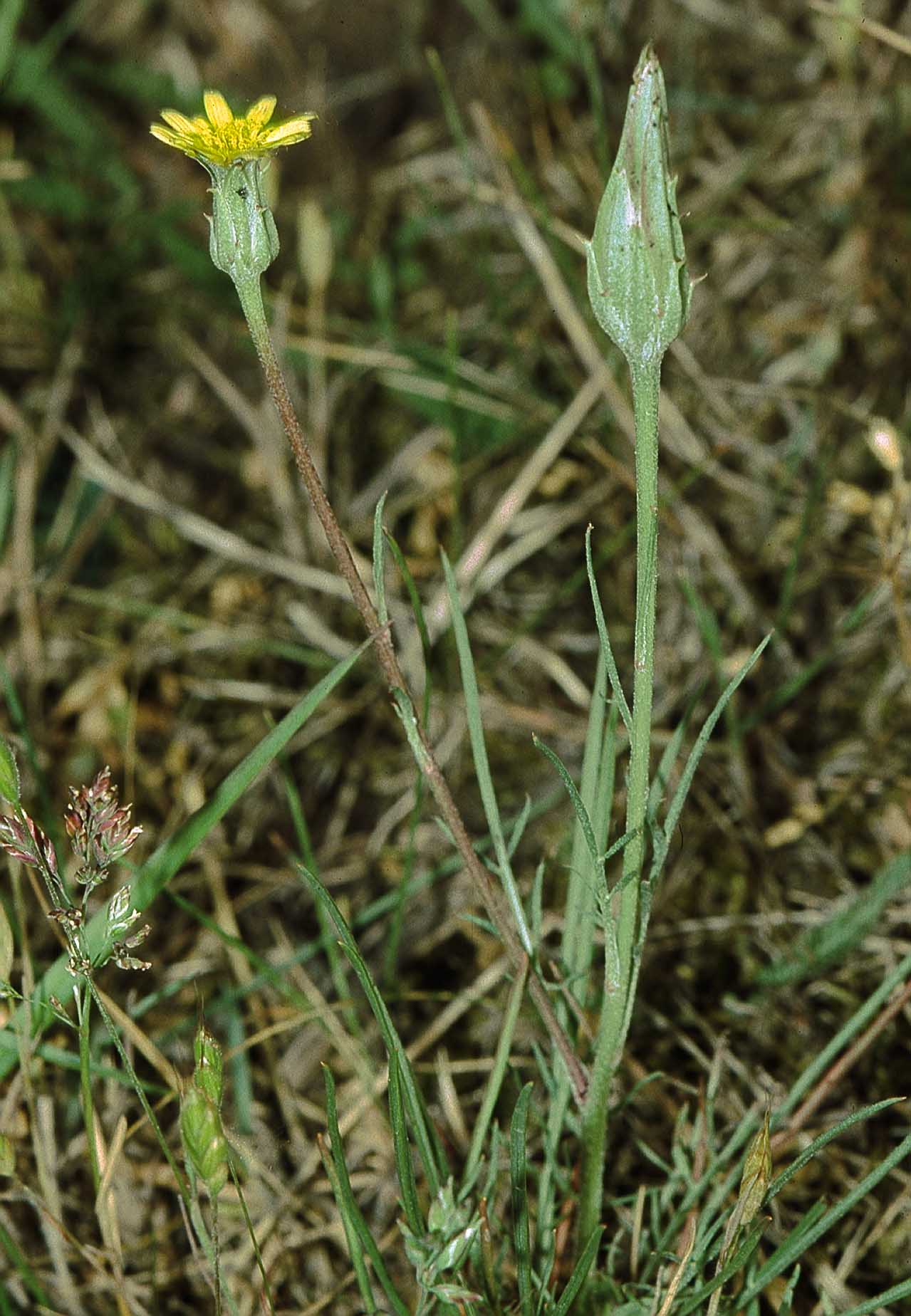

Scientific classification
- Kingdom: Plantae
- Clade: Tracheophytes
- Clade: Angiosperms
- Clade: Eudicots
- Clade: Asterids
- Order: Asterales
- Family: Asteraceae
- Genus: Scorzonera
- Species: S. laciniata

Binomial name
- Scorzonera laciniata L.

Synonyms
- List: Arachnospermum laciniatum (L.) F.W.Schmidt; Podospermum laciniatum (L.) DC.; Hieracium podospermum E.H.L.Krause; Podospermum angustissimum Schur; Podospermum buxbaumii K.Koch; Podospermum coronipifolium Sch.Bip. ex Webb & Berthel.; Podospermum decumbens var. angustifolia Gren. & Godr.; Podospermum heterophyllum K.Koch; Podospermum laciniatum var. heterophyllum Dumort.; Podospermum laciniatum var. integrifolium Gren. & Godr.; Podospermum laciniatum var. intermedium (Guss.) Gren. & Godr.; Podospermum laciniatum var. latifolium Gren. & Godr.; Podospermum laciniatum var. muricatum Lej.; Podospermum laciniatum var. subulatum (Lam.) DC.; Podospermum muricatum DC.; Podospermum muricatum var. spurinum Gaudin; Podospermum octangulare (Willd.) DC.; Podospermum salinum Schur; Podospermum subulatum (Lam.) DC.; Podospermum tenorei DC.; Podospermum tenuifolium Hoffmanns. & Link; Podospermum willkommii Sch.Bip. ex Willk.; Rhabdotheca resedifolia Pomel; Scorzonera calvescens DC.; Scorzonera hoffmanseggiana P.Silva; Scorzonera intermedia Guss.; Scorzonera laciniata var. integrifolia (Gren. & Godr.) Rouy; Scorzonera laciniata var. intermedia (Guss.) Rouy; Scorzonera laciniata f. latifolia (Gren. & Godr.) O.Bolòs & Vigo; Scorzonera laciniata var. latifolia (Gren. & Godr.) Rouy; Scorzonera laciniata var. subintegrifolia Lipsch.; Scorzonera laciniata f. subulata (Lam.) O.Bolòs & Vigo; Scorzonera laciniata var. subulata (Lam.) C.Díaz & Blanca; Scorzonera laciniata var. tenuifolia (Hoffmanns. & Link) Cout.; Scorzonera messeniaca Bory & Chaub.; Scorzonera muricata Balb.; Scorzonera octangularis Willd.; Scorzonera paucifida Lam.; Scorzonera petiolaris Lapeyr.; Scorzonera subulata Lam.; Scorzonera tenorei C.Presl

= Scorzonera laciniata =

Species of flowering plant

Scorzonera laciniata, also known as cutleaf vipergrass, is a species of herb in the family Asteraceae.

== Sources ==
This article incorporates text from a free content work. Licensed under CC0 (license statement/permission). Text taken from Podospermum laciniatum. Encyclopedia of Life.
