= ZD6126 =

Chemical compound

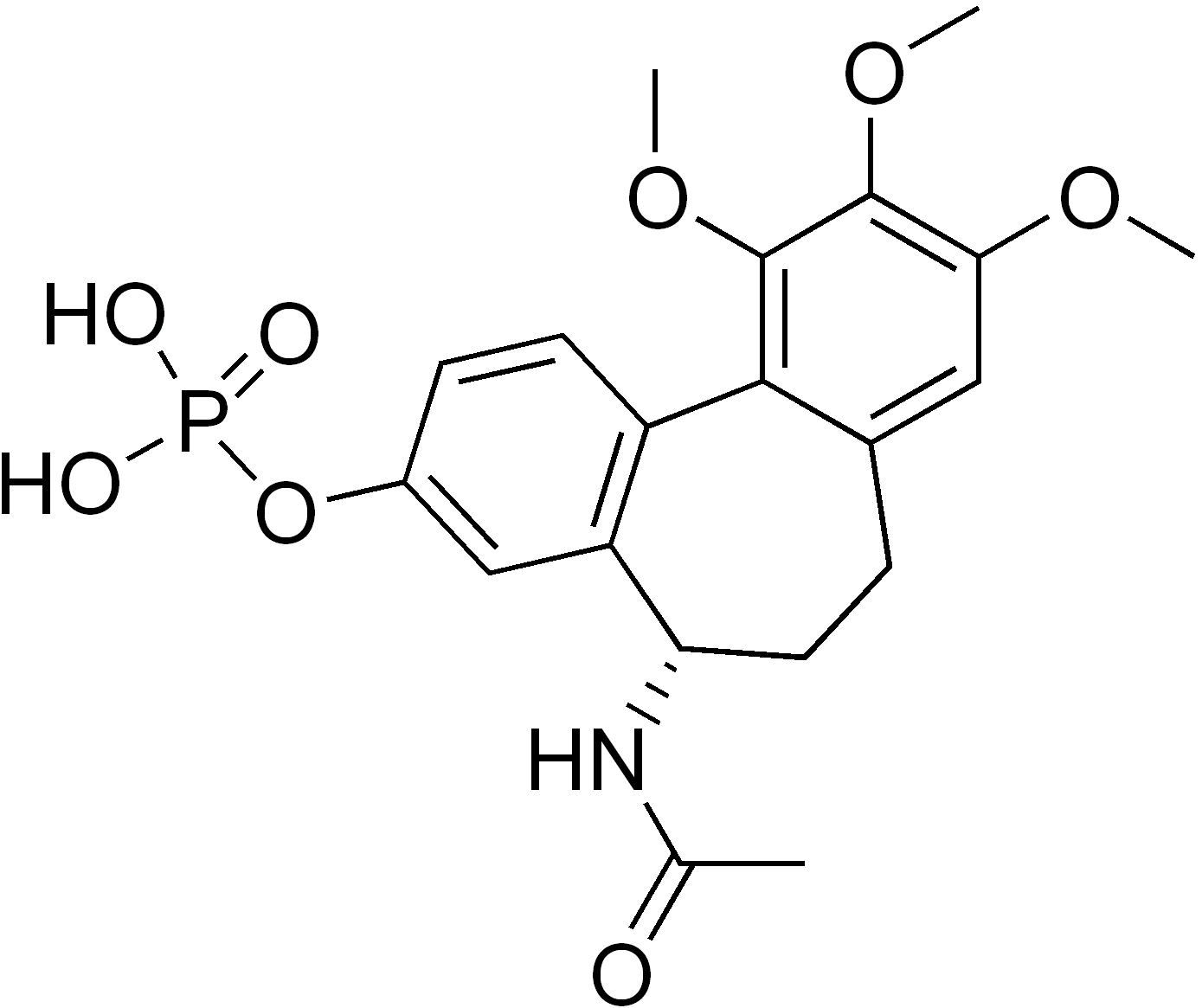

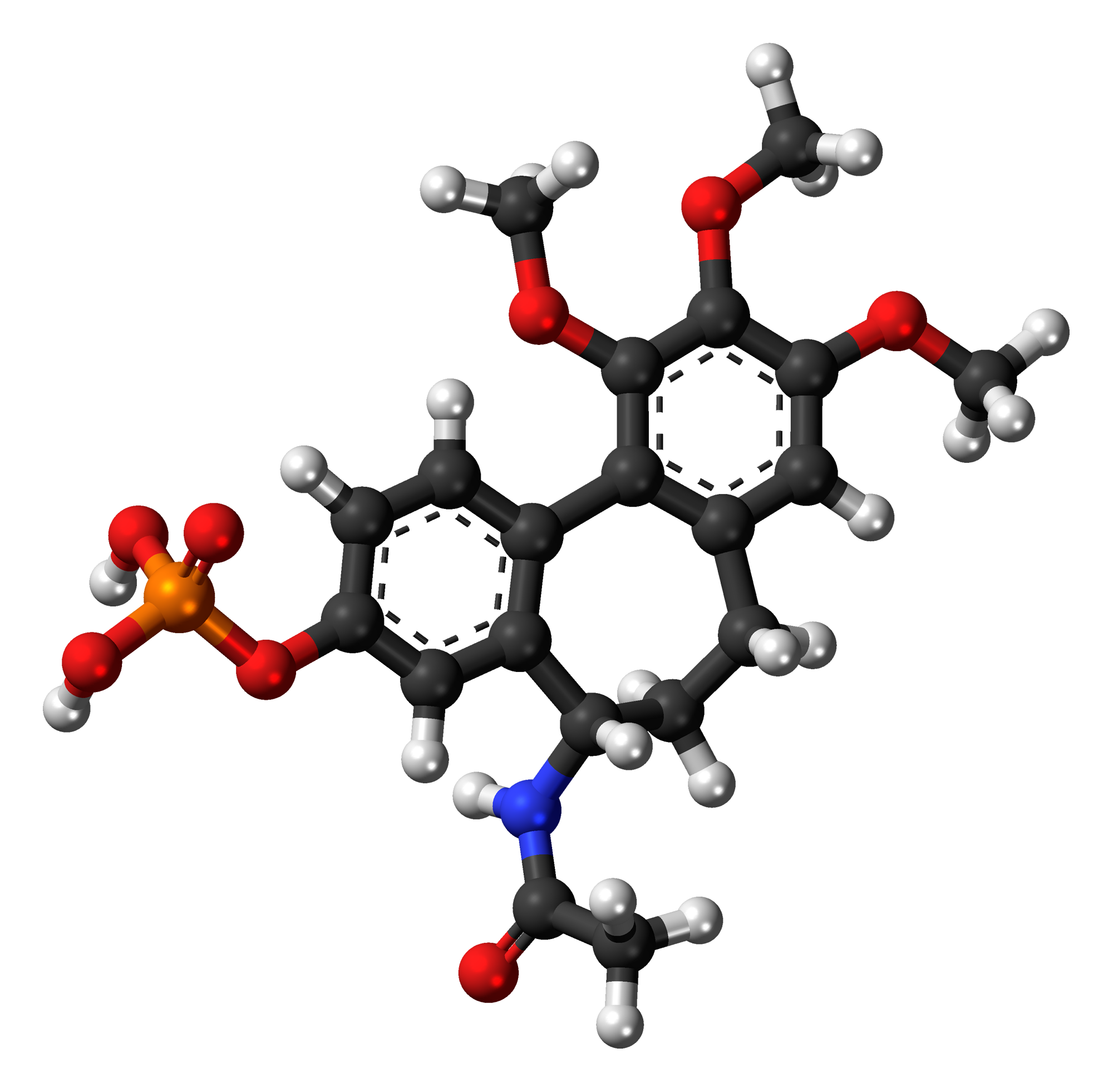

Clinical data
- Other names: ANG 453; AZD 6126; N-Acetylcolchicinol dihydrogenphosphate

Identifiers
- IUPAC name: Phosphoric acid mono-(5-acetylamino-9,10,11-trimethoxy-6,7-dihydro-5H-dibenzo[a,c]cyclohepten-3-yl) ester
- CAS Number: 219923-05-4
- PubChem CID: 9896434
- ChemSpider: 8072099
- UNII: GBO3S6M9W7
- CompTox Dashboard (EPA): DTXSID20944593

Chemical and physical data
- Formula: C_{20}H_{24}NO_{8}P
- Molar mass: 437.385 g·mol^{−1}
- 3D model (JSmol): Interactive image
- SMILES: CC(=O)N[C@H]1CCC2=CC(=C(C(=C2C3=C1C=C(C=C3)OP(=O)(O)O)OC)OC)OC
- InChI: InChI=1S/C20H24NO8P/c1-11(22)21-16-8-5-12-9-17(26-2)19(27-3)20(28-4)18(12)14-7-6-13(10-15(14)16)29-30(23,24)25/h6-7,9-10,16H,5,8H2,1-4H3,(H,21,22)(H2,23,24,25)/t16-/m0/s1; Key:UGBMEXLBFDAOGL-INIZCTEOSA-N

ZD6126 is a vascular-targeting agent and a prodrug of N-acetylcolchinol, related to colchicine. It has shown promising results on tumors in mice.

A phase I clinical trial identified gastrointestinal and cardiac effects as limiting dosing. Two phase II clinical trials were suspended investigating ZD6126 in metastatic renal cell carcinoma and metastatic colorectal cancer.

ZD6126 was being investigated by AstraZeneca as a vascular disrupting agent (VDA). However, the trials were halted, after it became apparent that ZD6126 was too cardiotoxic at the required doses.
