= Scorzonera drarii =

Scientific classification
- Kingdom: Plantae
- Clade: Tracheophytes
- Clade: Angiosperms
- Clade: Eudicots
- Clade: Asterids
- Order: Asterales
- Family: Asteraceae
- Genus: Scorzonera
- Species: S. drarii

Binomial name
- Scorzonera drarii V.Tackh.

Species of plant

Scorzonera drarii is a species of flowering plant in the family Asteraceae, endemic to the Sinai Peninsula. A very rare hemicryptophyte found in cultivated fields, it is believed to be extinct.
