= Scolecomorphus vittatus =

Conservation status
- Least Concern (IUCN 3.1)

Scientific classification
- Kingdom: Animalia
- Phylum: Chordata
- Class: Amphibia
- Order: Gymnophiona
- Clade: Apoda
- Family: Scolecomorphidae
- Genus: Scolecomorphus
- Species: S. vittatus

Binomial name
- Scolecomorphus vittatus (Boulenger, 1895)
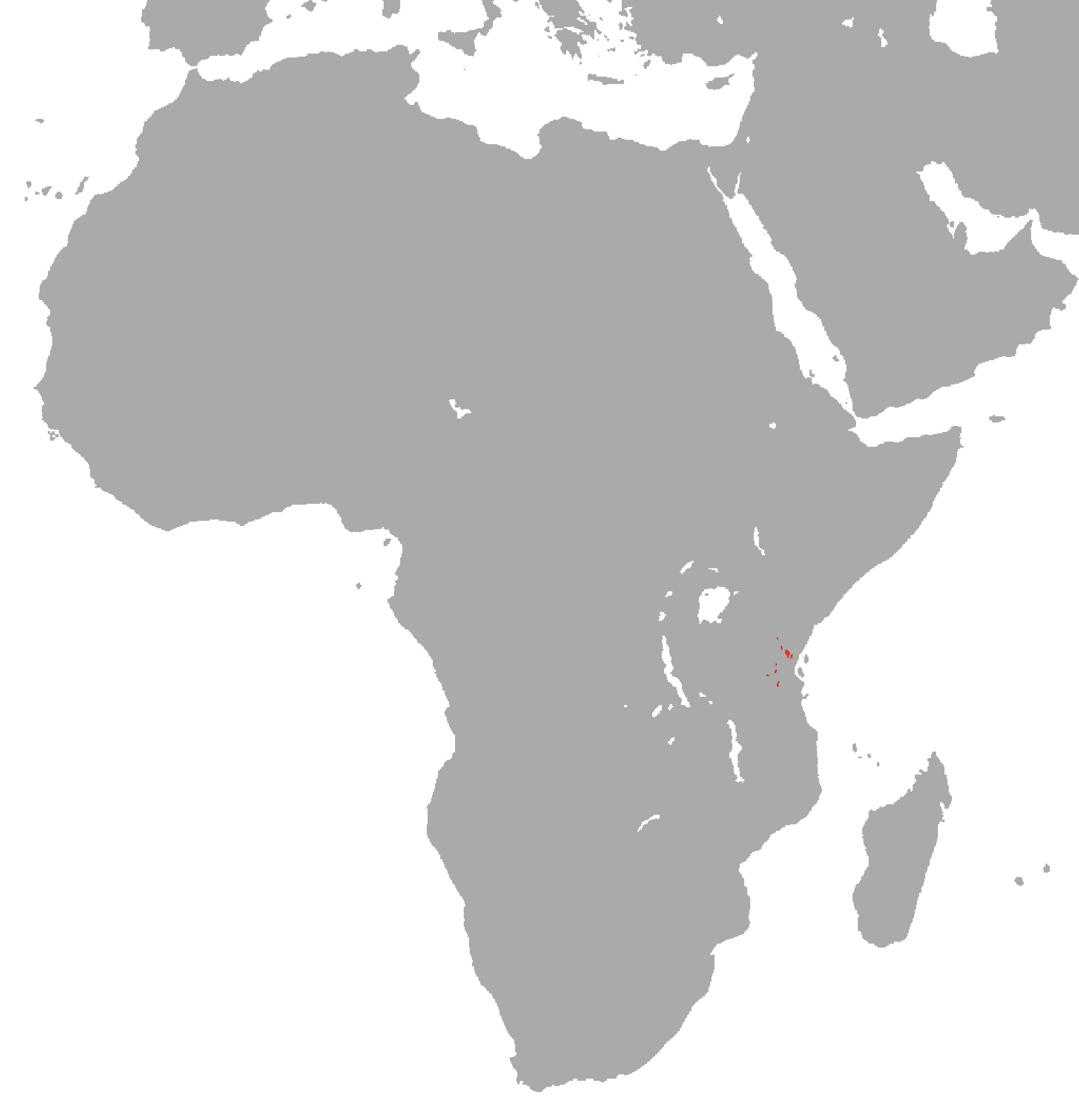

Species of amphibian

Scolecomorphus vittatus, the banded caecilian, is a species of caecilian in the family Scolecomorphidae, endemic to Tanzania. Its natural habitats are subtropical or tropical moist lowland forests, subtropical or tropical moist montane forests, plantations, rural gardens, and heavily degraded former forests.

The effects of S. vittatus skin toxin have been observed after a researcher, as part of a joke, put a specimen in their mouth: it was reported as causing a burning sensation and uncontrollable salivation lasting more than 30 minutes. The specimen was not visibly harmed.
