= Scolecomorphus uluguruensis =

Conservation status
- Endangered (IUCN 3.1)

Scientific classification
- Kingdom: Animalia
- Phylum: Chordata
- Class: Amphibia
- Order: Gymnophiona
- Clade: Apoda
- Family: Scolecomorphidae
- Genus: Scolecomorphus
- Species: S. uluguruensis

Binomial name
- Scolecomorphus uluguruensis Barbour and Loveridge, 1928
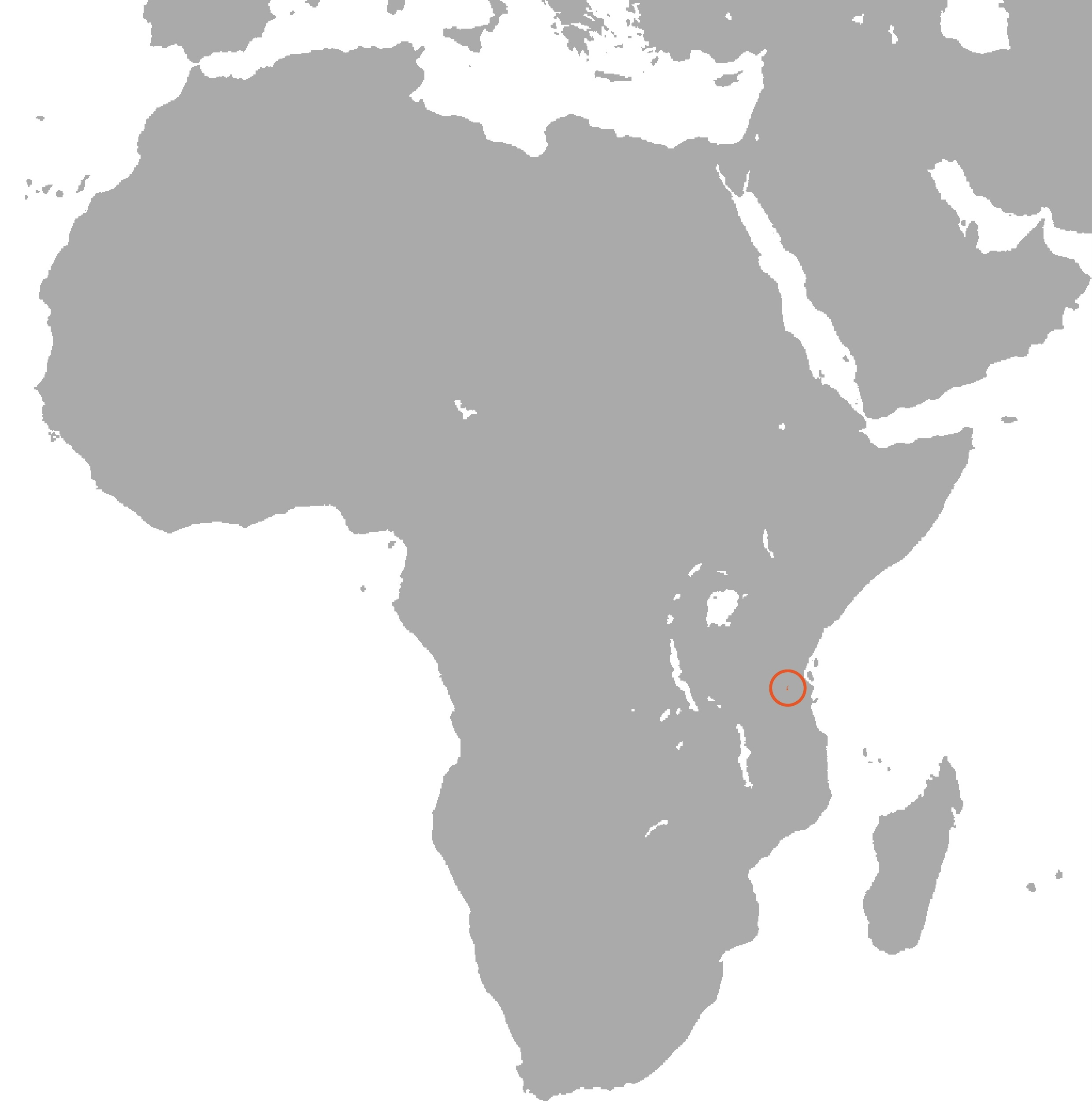

Synonyms
- Scolecomorphus attenuatus Barbour and Loveridge, 1928

Species of amphibian

Scolecomorphus uluguruensis (common names: Uluguru black caecilian, Nyingwa caecilian), is a species of caecilian in the family Scolecomorphidae. It is endemic to the Uluguru Mountains, Tanzania.

== Habitat and conservation ==
Scolecomorphus uluguruensis is a soil-dwelling species that occurs in montane forests at elevations of 1,800–2,050 m (5,910–6,730 ft) above sea level. Presumably, it can also live in secondary habitats such as small-holder agricultural areas. It is viviparous and does not need water bodies for reproduction.

The species has been recorded as locally abundant in the past, and it has also been collected in recent years. It probably suffers from habitat disturbance and conversion caused by deforestation and agricultural intensification, although it is not known whether these constitute significant threats. It occurs in the Uluguru Nature Reserve, but small-holder agriculture is encroaching on the reserve. The International Union for Conservation of Nature (IUCN) has reassessed Scolecomorphus uluguruensis as "Endangered" because it is known only from few locations and there is ongoing habitat loss.
