= Haussknechtia =

Scientific classification
- Kingdom: Plantae
- Clade: Tracheophytes
- Clade: Angiosperms
- Clade: Eudicots
- Clade: Asterids
- Order: Apiales
- Family: Apiaceae
- Subfamily: Apioideae
- Tribe: Pimpinelleae
- Genus: Haussknechtia; Boiss.
- Species: H. elymaitica

Binomial name
- Haussknechtia elymaitica Boiss.

Synonyms
- Dorema elymaitica (Boiss.) Koso-Pol.

Genus of plants

Haussknechtia is a monotypic genus of flowering plants belonging to the family Apiaceae. It only contains one species, Haussknechtia elymaitica. It is commonly known as johour or white celery in Iran.

It is a perennial plant, that is 2-3 m tall glabrous (smooth) and with large bipinnatisect (deeply dissected segments) basal leaves and numerous flowers that are grouped in globose (rounded) umbels, situated on the usually simple or slightly branched stems.

It is native to Iran.

The genus name of Haussknechtia is in honour of Heinrich Carl Haussknecht (1838–1903), a German pharmacist and botanical collector. The Latin specific epithet of elymaitica refers to Elymais, an ancient region, in 2nd century BC to the early 3rd century AD. Haussknechtia elymaitica was first described and published in Fl. Orient. Vol.2 on page 960 in 1872.
