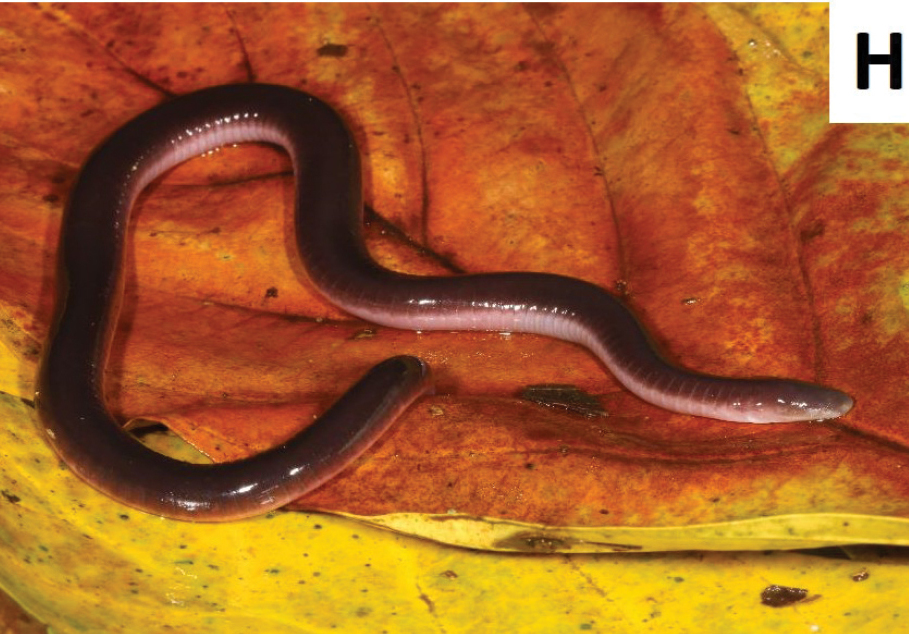

Conservation status
- Least Concern (IUCN 3.1)

Scientific classification
- Kingdom: Animalia
- Phylum: Chordata
- Class: Amphibia
- Order: Gymnophiona
- Clade: Apoda
- Family: Scolecomorphidae
- Genus: Scolecomorphus
- Species: S. kirkii

Binomial name
- Scolecomorphus kirkii Boulenger, 1883

Synonyms
- Scolecomorphus convexus Taylor, 1968

= Scolecomorphus kirkii =

Species of amphibian

Scolecomorphus kirkii (common names: Kirk's caecilian, Lake Tanganyika caecilian) is a species of caecilian in the family Scolecomorphidae. It is known from southern Malawi east of the Shire River, northern Mozambique, and Tanzania (including the Nguru, Udzungwa and Uluguru Mountains); the known distribution is discontinuous but the species is expected to occur in the intervening areas.

== Etymology ==
The specific name kirkii refers to Sir John Kirk, a Scottish diplomat, naturalist, and explorer.

== Description ==
Adults measure 215–463 mm (8.5–18.2 in) in snout–vent length; it is the largest Scolecomorphus species. There are 130–152 primary annuli (ring-shaped folds). The dorsal colouration is lavender-grey and extends to the sides such that it encroaches the flesh or cream coloured mid-ventral surfaces. It is possible that the colouration is aposematic.

Scolecomorphus kirkii is assumed to be viviparous and not to depend on bodies of water in its reproduction. It is an efficient burrower that feeds on arthropods. Among its predators is the fossorial snake Atractaspis aterrima, based on a S. kirkii individual found in the gut of this snake.

== Habitat and conservation ==
Scolecomorphus kirkii is a soil-dwelling species that occurs in montane and submontane forests, generally at elevations above 1,000 m (3,300 ft) above sea level but sometimes down to 500 m (1,600 ft) asl. It can also live in secondary habitats like fruit gardens and small-holder agricultural areas.

It is locally abundant. It can probably suffer from habitat disturbance and conversion caused by deforestation and agricultural intensification, although it is not known whether these constitute significant threats. It has been recorded in pet trade but only rarely. The International Union for Conservation of Nature (IUCN) has assessed it as of "Least Concern".
