= Crotaphatrema bornmuelleri =

Conservation status
- Data Deficient (IUCN 3.1)

Scientific classification
- Kingdom: Animalia
- Phylum: Chordata
- Class: Amphibia
- Order: Gymnophiona
- Clade: Apoda
- Family: Scolecomorphidae
- Genus: Crotaphatrema
- Species: C. bornmuelleri

Binomial name
- Crotaphatrema bornmuelleri (Werner, 1899)
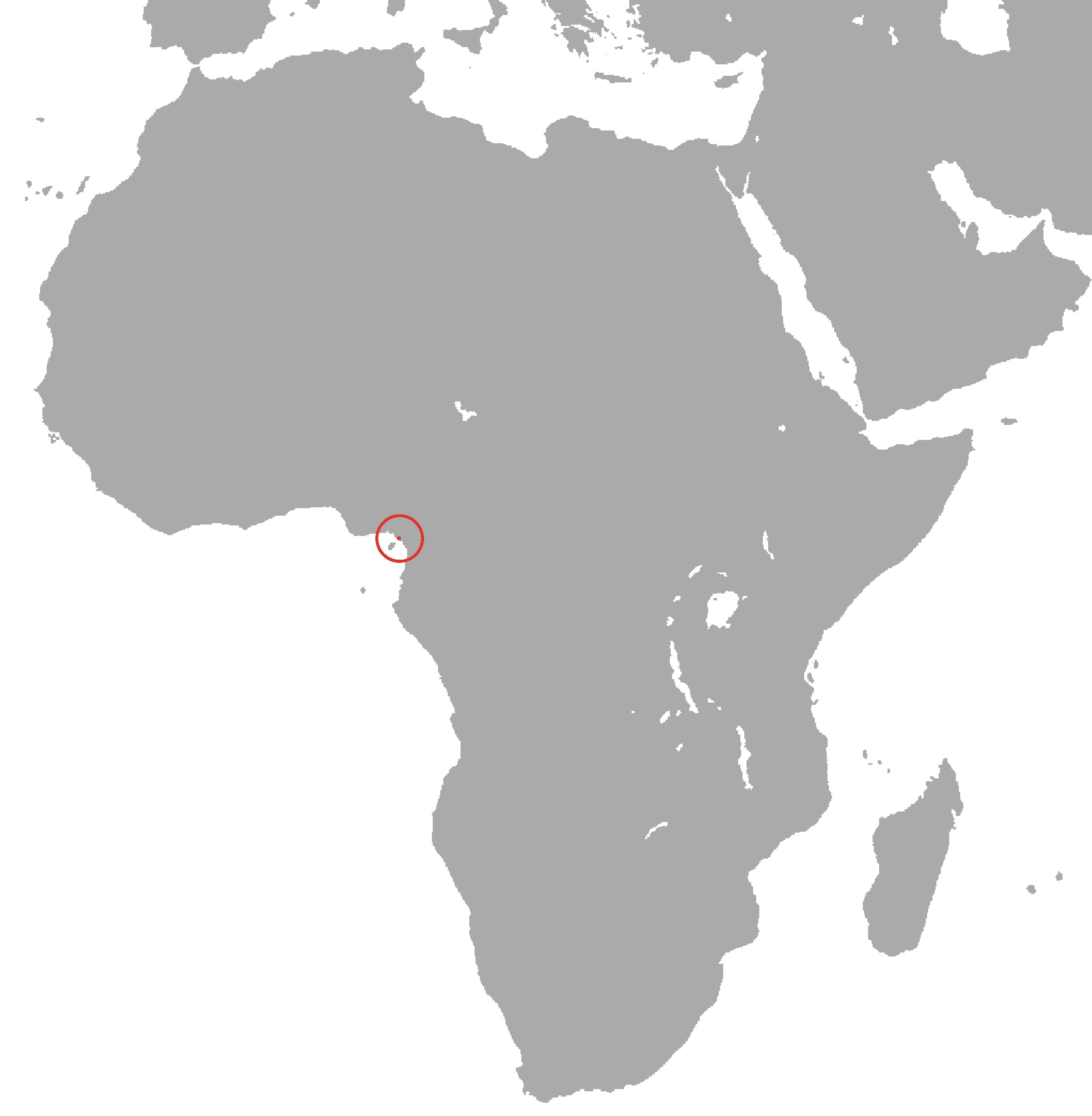

Synonyms
- Herpele bornmuelleri Werner, 1899

Species of amphibian

Crotaphatrema bornmuelleri is a species of caecilian in the family Scolecomorphidae. It is endemic to Cameroon. The specific name bornmuelleri honours Joseph Friedrich Nicolaus Bornmüller, a German botanist. Common names Bornmuller's caecilian and Bornmüller's caecilian have been coined for it.

Like most species of its genus, it may be found at high elevations including Mount Cameroon. It was collected by Werner in 1893 and the holotype was collected by a local in an unknown location but its natural habitats may be subtropical or tropical moist lowland forests, plantations, rural gardens, and heavily degraded former forests. No exact threats are known but if the species relies on soil moisture and temperature maintained by vegetation, it may be threatened by habitat disturbance and agricultural activities including herbicides and pesticides. There has been habitat loss in its range but may be adaptable.
