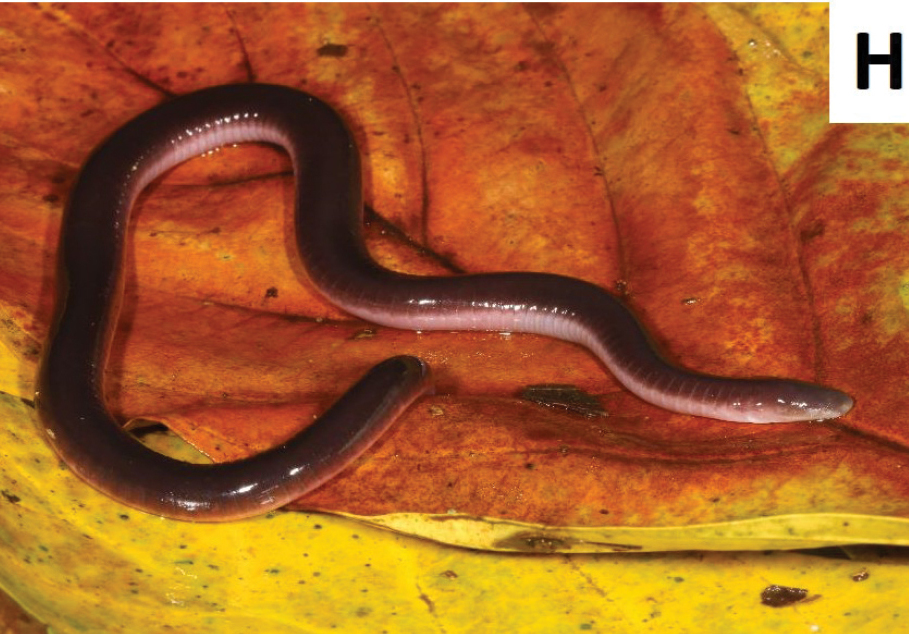
- Scolecomorphus kirkii

Scientific classification
- Kingdom: Animalia
- Phylum: Chordata
- Class: Amphibia
- Order: Gymnophiona
- Clade: Apoda
- Family: Scolecomorphidae; Taylor, 1969

Genera
- Crotaphatrema; Scolecomorphus

= Scolecomorphidae =

Family of amphibians

The Scolecomorphidae (from Greek: σκώλεκώς skólekós, 'wormlike' and Greek: μορφή morphḗ, 'form') are a family of caecilians also known as tropical caecilians, buried-eyed caecilians, or African caecilians. They are found in Cameroon in West Africa, and Malawi and Tanzania in East Africa. Caecilians are legless amphibians which superficially resemble worms or snakes.

Scolecomorphids have only vestigial eyes, which are attached to the base of a pair of tentacles underneath the snout. Unlike other caecilians, they have only primary annuli; these are grooves running incompletely around the body, giving the animal a segmented appearance. All other caecilians have a complex pattern of grooves, with secondary or tertiary annuli present. Also uniquely amongst tetrapods, the scolecomorphids lack a stapes bone in the middle ear.

At least some species of scolecomorphids give birth to live young, retaining the eggs inside the females' bodies until they hatch into fully formed offspring, without the presence of a free-living larval stage.

== Morphology ==
Studies examining the cranial anatomy of Scolecomorphus kirkii revealed that the species possess a highly ossified and compace skull structure, characterized by fusion of several cranial bones. It identified unique configurations of the macillopalatine bone, which helps facilitate the movement of the sensory tentacles on the face of Caecilians. This adaptation is believed to enhance the tentacles protrusion and retraction capabilities, aiding in environmental sensing during subterranean navigation

== Taxonomy ==
Just six species of scolecomorphids are known, grouped into two genera, as follows:

Family Scolecomorphidae

- Genus Crotaphatrema Nussbaum, 1985
  - Crotaphatrema bornmuelleri (Werner, 1899), Bornmuller's caecilian, Cameroon
  - Crotaphatrema lamottei (Nussbaum, 1981), Mont Oku caecilian, Cameroon
  - Crotaphatrema tchabalmbaboensis Lawson, 2000, Cameroon
- Genus Scolecomorphus Boulenger, 1883
  - Scolecomorphus kirkii Boulenger, 1883, Kirk's caecilian or Lake Tanganyika caecilian, East Africa
  - Scolecomorphus uluguruensis Barbour and Loveridge, 1928, Uluguru black caecilian or Nyingwa caecilian, Tanzania
  - Scolecomorphus vittatus (Boulenger, 1895), ribbon caecilian or banded caecilian, Tanzania
