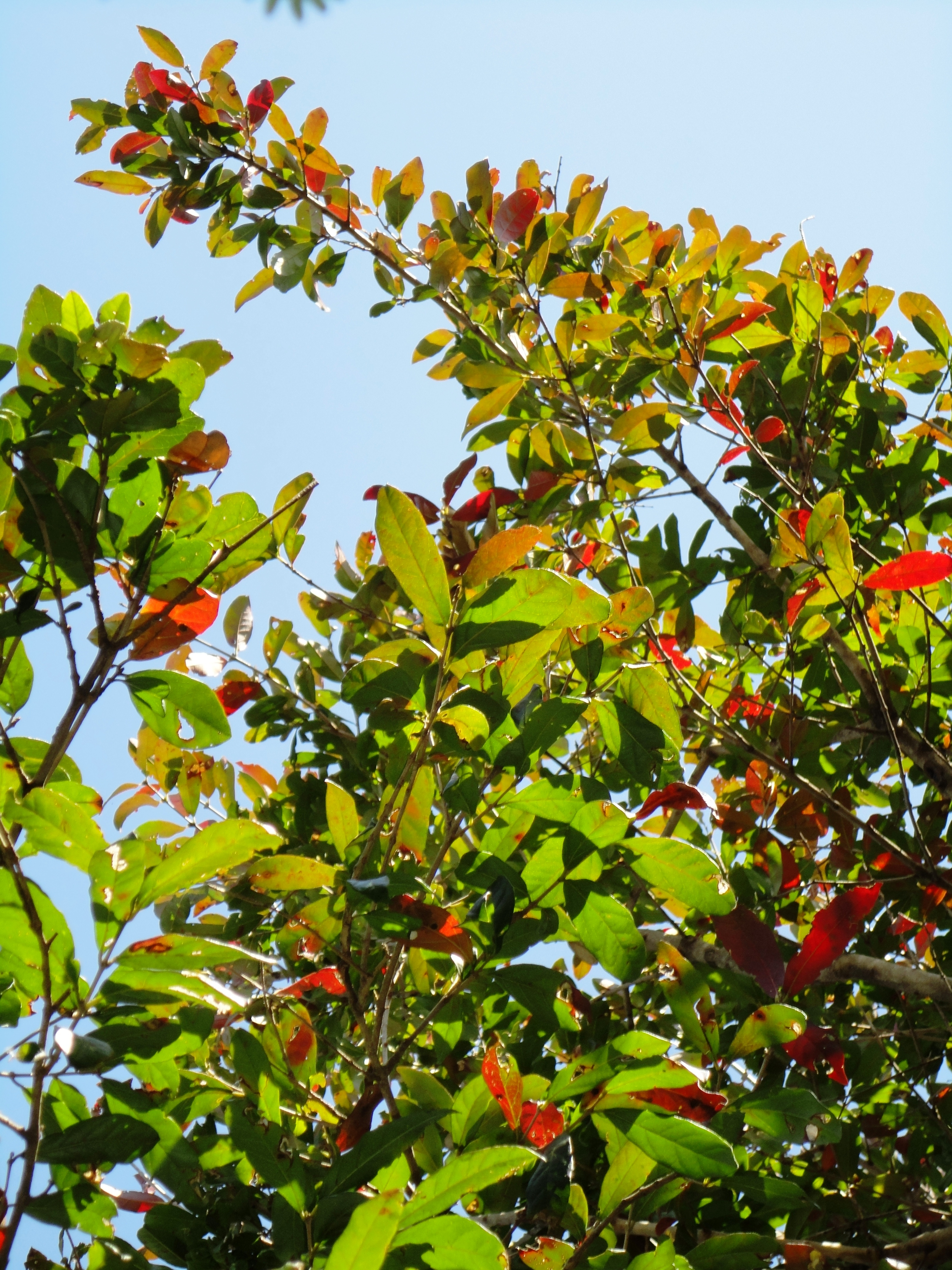
- C. kraussii winter foliage

Conservation status
- Least Concern (IUCN 3.1)

Scientific classification
- Kingdom: Plantae
- Clade: Tracheophytes
- Clade: Angiosperms
- Clade: Eudicots
- Clade: Rosids
- Order: Myrtales
- Family: Combretaceae
- Genus: Combretum
- Species: C. kraussii

Binomial name
- Combretum kraussii Hochst.

Synonyms
- Combretum nelsonii Dümmer; Combretum woodii Dümmer

= Combretum kraussii =

Forest bushwillow

Species of tree

Combretum kraussii, the forest bushwillow, is a medium-sized to large tree in the family Combretaceae. It is found in eastern South Africa, Eswatini and southern Mozambique, in the vicinity of forests. The specific name commemorates Dr. F. Krauss who undertook a collecting trip to South Africa from 1838 to 1840.

== Description ==
The trees are semi-deciduous, as spring leaves only partially replace old foliage. These forest trees become conspicuous in late spring, when the fresh leaves turn to a pale, almost white colour, before returning to green by mid-summer. In winter the foliage turns partially red or purple, which is shed just before flowering starts. The fresh clusters of four-winged fruit are a colourful red or yellowy red colour, before they dry to mid-brown.

== Biochemical ==
Combretastatin B-1, a type of stilbenoid, can be found in C. kraussii.

== Relationships ==
It is closely related to Combretum nelsonii which occurs in rockier habitats, and bears a resemblance to the larger leaved Combretum woodii, which is similarly distributed, but in bushveld.

== Gallery ==
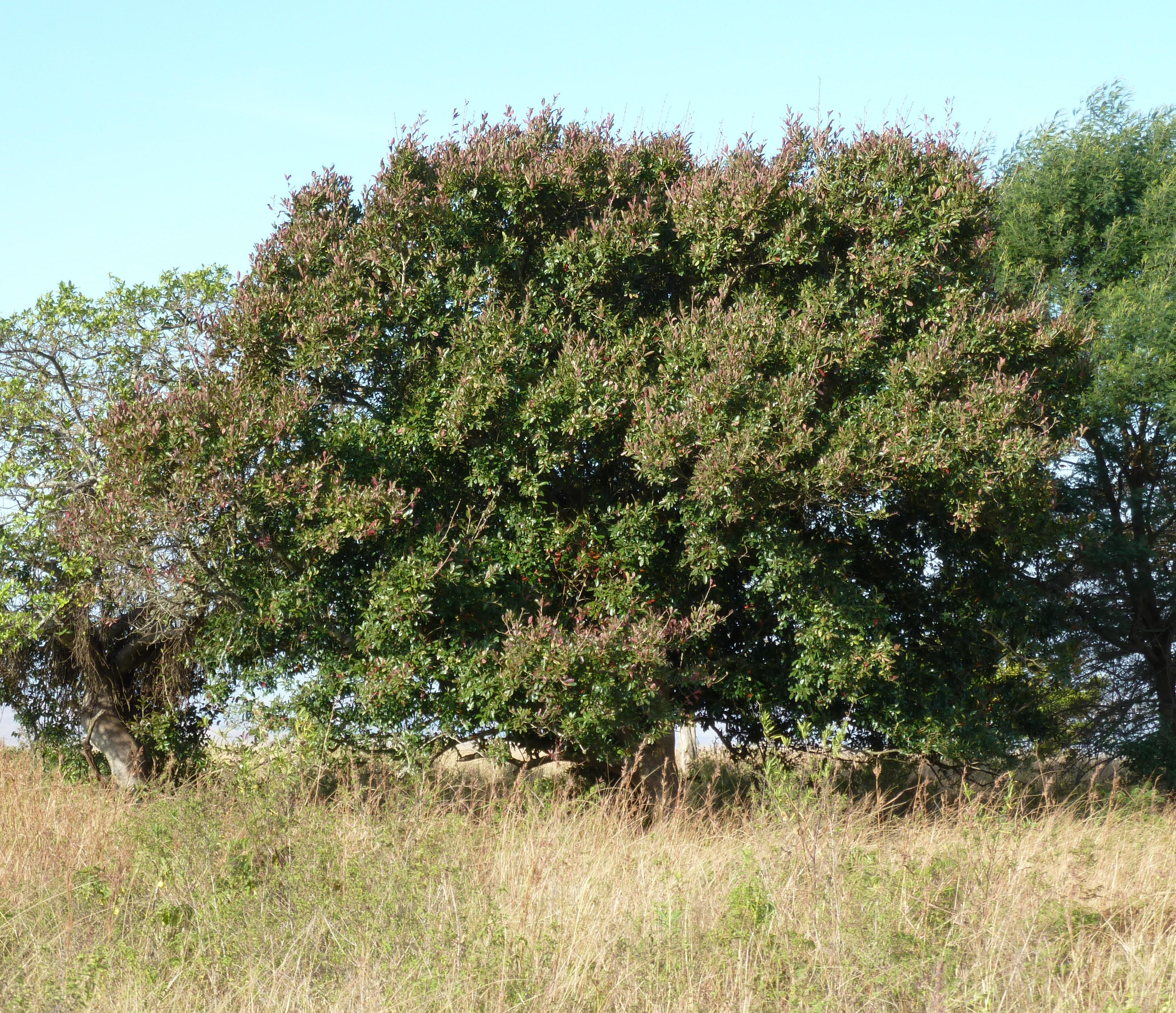
mature tree

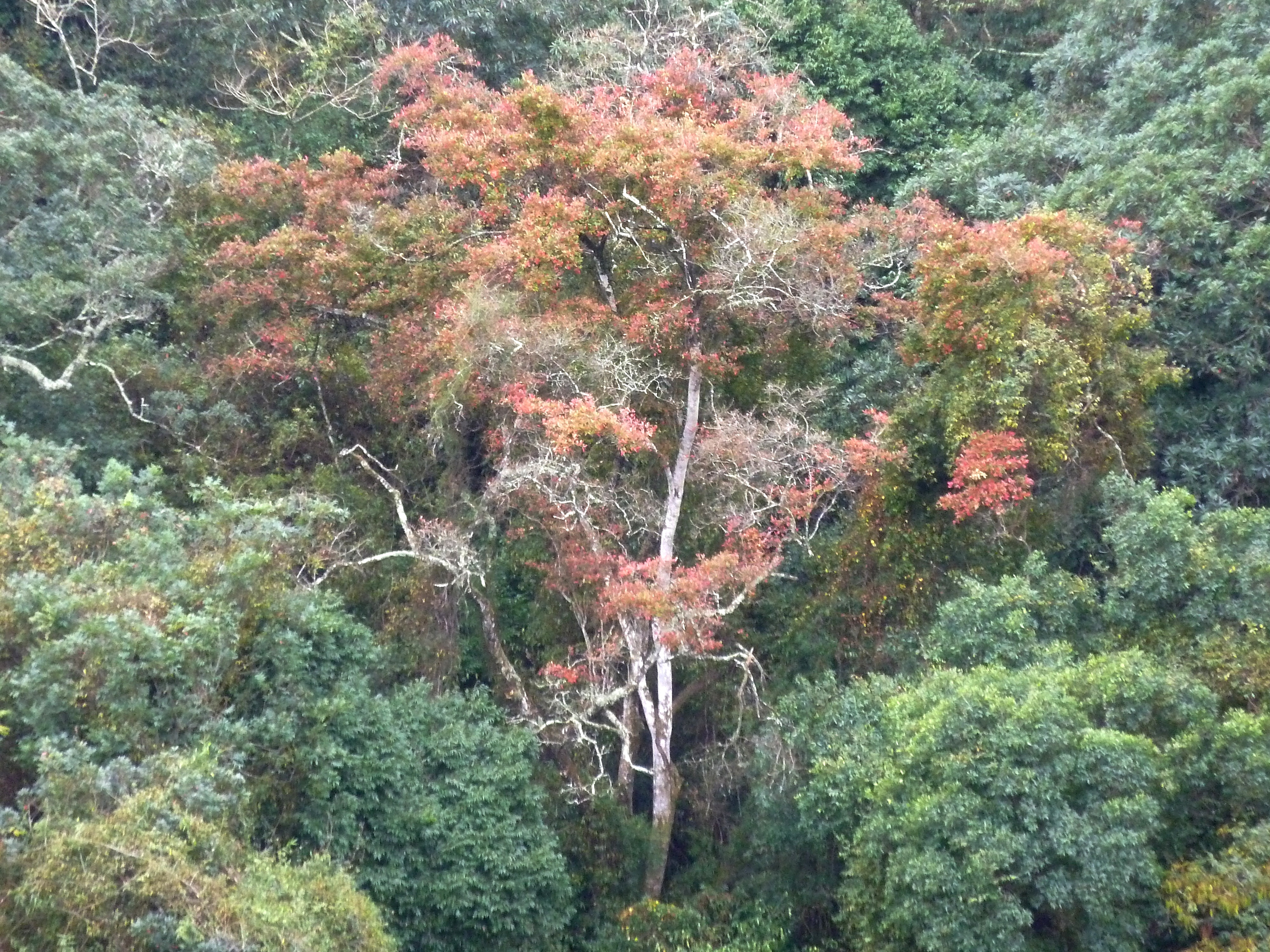
red winter foliage

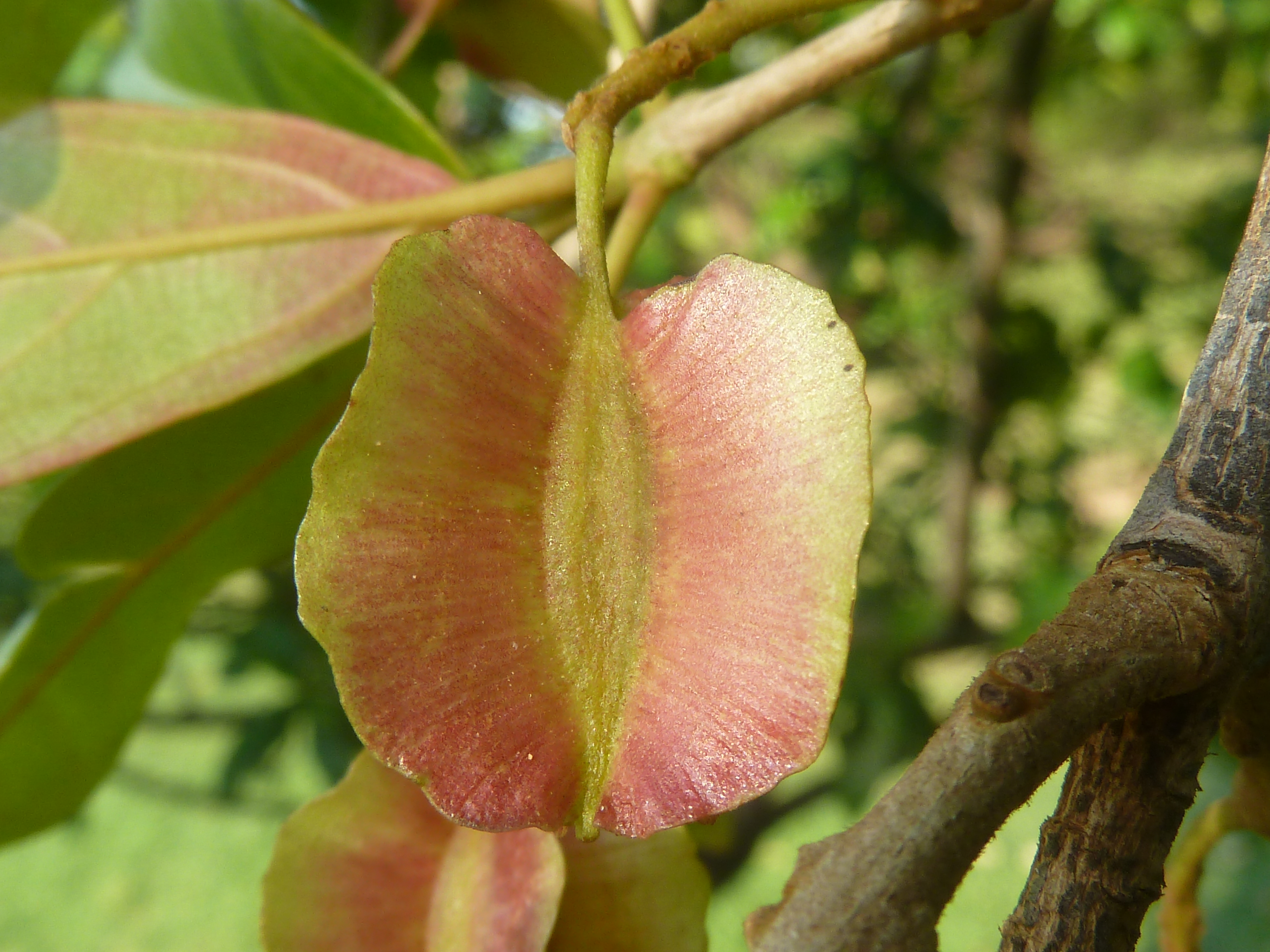
fruit

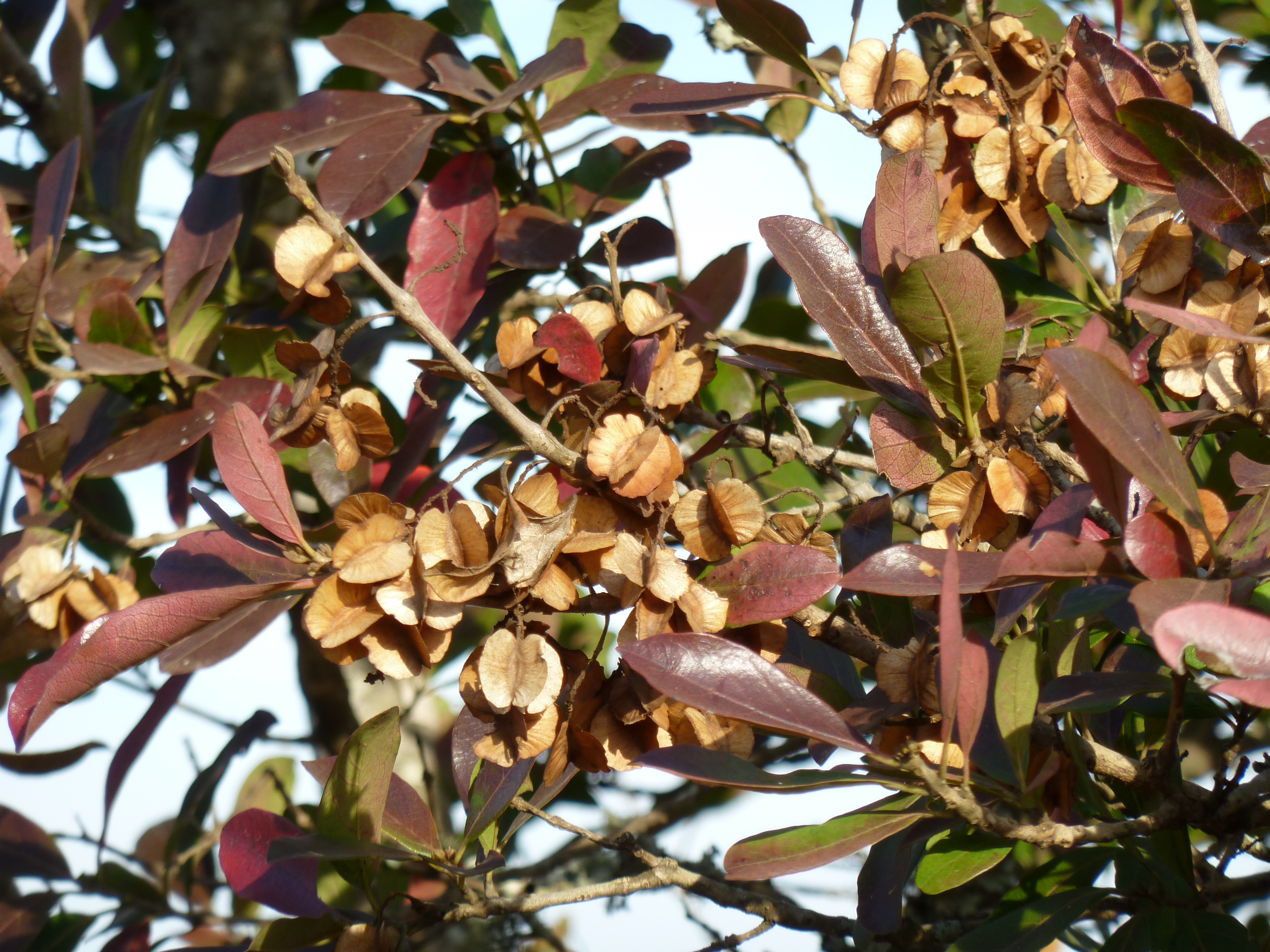
dry fruit in winter
