= Fosbretabulin =

Chemical compound

Clinical data
- Other names: Combretastatin A-4 phosphate; CA4P; CA4PD; fosbretabulin disodium; fosbretabulin tromethamine

Legal status
- Legal status: Investigational

Identifiers
- IUPAC name: Phosphoric acid mono-{2-methoxy-5-[(Z)-2-(3,4,5-trimethoxy-phenyl)-vinyl]-phenyl} ester
- CAS Number: 222030-63-9
- PubChem CID: 5351387
- ChemSpider: 4508406
- UNII: I5590ES2QZ
- CompTox Dashboard (EPA): DTXSID401028843

Chemical and physical data
- Formula: C_{18}H_{21}O_{8}P
- Molar mass: 396.332 g·mol^{−1}
- 3D model (JSmol): Interactive image
- SMILES: O=P(O)(O)Oc1c(OC)ccc(c1)\C=C/c2cc(OC)c(OC)c(OC)c2
- InChI: InChI=1S/C18H21O8P/c1-22-14-8-7-12(9-15(14)26-27(19,20)21)5-6-13-10-16(23-2)18(25-4)17(11-13)24-3/h5-11H,1-4H3,(H2,19,20,21)/b6-5-; Key:WDOGQTQEKVLZIJ-WAYWQWQTSA-N

Fosbretabulin (also known as combretastatin A-4 phosphate or CA4P) is a microtubule destabilizing experimental drug, a type of vascular-targeting agent, a drug designed to damage the vasculature (blood vessels) of cancer tumours causing central necrosis. It is a derivative of combretastatin. It is formulated as the salts fosbretabulin disodium and fosbretabulin tromethamine.

Fosbretabulin is a prodrug. In vivo, it is dephosphorylated to its active metabolite, combretastatin A-4.

In July 2007, the pharmaceutical company OXiGENE initiated a 180-patient phase III clinical trial of fosbretabulin in combination with carboplatin for the treatment of anaplastic thyroid cancer. There is currently no fully FDA approved treatment for this form of cancer. By 2017, it had completed multiple clinical trials (e.g. for solid tumours, non-small cell lung cancer) with more in progress.

== See also ==
- Combretastatin, e.g. for the chemical synthesis
