= Vadimezan =

Chemical compound

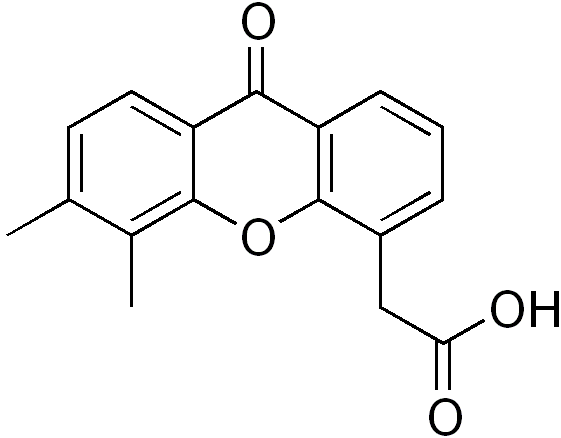

Clinical data
- Other names: ASA404, DMXAA
- ATC code: none

Identifiers
- IUPAC name: (5,6-Dimethyl-9-oxo-9H-xanthen-4-yl)-acetic acid
- CAS Number: 117570-53-3
- ChemSpider: 110486
- UNII: 0829J8133H
- ChEBI: CHEBI:75934
- CompTox Dashboard (EPA): DTXSID2040949
- ECHA InfoCard: 100.107.097

Chemical and physical data
- Formula: C_{17}H_{14}O_{4}
- Molar mass: 282.295 g·mol^{−1}
- 3D model (JSmol): Interactive image
- SMILES: CC1=C(OC(C(CC(O)=O)=CC=C3)=C3C2=O)C2=CC=C1C
- InChI: InChI=1S/C17H14O4/c1-9-6-7-13-15(20)12-5-3-4-11(8-14(18)19)17(12)21-16(13)10(9)2/h3-7H,8H2,1-2H3,(H,18,19); Key:XGOYIMQSIKSOBS-UHFFFAOYSA-N

Vadimezan (also known as or ASA404 and dimethylxanthenone acetic acid or DMXAA) is a tumor-vascular disrupting agent (tumor-VDA) that attacks the blood supply of a cancerous tumor to cause tumor regression.

== Clinical trials ==
=== Non-small cell lung cancer ===
Despite positive results at the preclinical stage, vadimezan failed in human clinical trials. Studies have demonstrated the reason for the inefficacy. Vadimezan was shown to target the STING pathway, however, this effect is mouse specific; it has no effect on human STING. A single amino acid difference at position 162 (S162A) of the cyclic-dinucleotide-binding site of STING makes mouse STING sensitive to the drug, whereas human STING remains insensitive.

Vadimezan had been studied in combination with chemotherapy in at least two Phase II trials for advanced non-small cell lung cancer (NSCLC) and showed survival extensions of around 5 months when compared to chemotherapy alone (14.0 months compared to 8.8 months). In April 2008, a Phase III trial started. In March 2010, the phase III trial of use as a first line therapy for NSCLC gave poor results. Interim results on another phase III trial as second-line therapy for NSCLC were completed in 2011. In November 2010, the second trial also gave poor interim results.

=== Other cancers ===
Vadimezan has also been studied for the treatment of prostate cancer and HER2-negative metastatic breast cancer.

== History ==
Vadimezan was discovered by Bruce Baguley and William Denny and their teams at the Auckland Cancer Society Research Centre at the University of Auckland in New Zealand. It was licensed to Antisoma in 2001. Novartis acquired the worldwide rights for it in 2007 and it underwent development by Antisoma and Novartis. In 2020 CRM Therapeutics, a Dutch drug-development company, initiated research for re-developing Vadimezan in combination with its proprietary targeted delivery platform. Since January 2021, Vadimezan is a registered trademark of CRM Therapeutics B.V., Rotterdam.
