= Combretastatin A-1 =

Names
- Preferred IUPAC name 3-Methoxy-6-[(E)-2-(3,4,5-trimethoxyphenyl)ethen-1-yl]benzene-1,2-diol
- Other names Combretastatin A1; OXi4500

Identifiers
CAS Number	109971-63-3
3D model (JSmol)	Interactive image
ChEMBL	ChEMBL520204
ChemSpider	4800178
PubChem CID	6078282
UNII	2222ATS339
- InChI: InChI=1S/C18H20O6/c1-21-13-8-7-12(16(19)17(13)20)6-5-11-9-14(22-2)18(24-4)15(10-11)23-3/h5-10,19-20H,1-4H3/b6-5+ Key: YUSYSJSHVJULID-AATRIKPKSA-N
- SMILES: COC1=C(C(=C(C=C1)C=CC2=CC(=C(C(=C2)OC)OC)OC)O)O

Properties
Chemical formula	C_{18}H_{20}O_{6}
Molar mass	332.352 g·mol^{−1}
- Except where otherwise noted, data are given for materials in their standard state (at 25 °C [77 °F], 100 kPa). verify (what is ?) Infobox references

Combretastatin A-1 is a combretastatin and a stilbenoid. It can be found in Combretum afrum, the Eastern Cape South African Bushwillow tree.

== Biological effects in mammals ==
It is an antiangiogenic agent acting by destabilizing tubulin, which induces cell apoptosis of proliferating endothelial cells.

== Derivatives as drugs ==
Currently designated an orphan drug by the FDA, combretastatin A1 diphosphate (OXi4503 or CA1P) is in Phase I clinical trials for relapsed and refractory acute myeloid leukemia and myelodysplastic syndrome.
