= Bibenzyl =

Names
- Preferred IUPAC name 1,1′-(Ethane-1,2-diyl)dibenzene
- Other names 1,2-Diphenylethane; Dibenzil; Dibenzyl; Dihydrostilbene sym-Diphenylethane

Identifiers
CAS Number	103-29-7
3D model (JSmol)	Interactive image
Abbreviations	Bn_{2}
ChEBI	CHEBI:34047
ChEMBL	ChEMBL440895
ChemSpider	7364
ECHA InfoCard	100.002.816
PubChem CID	7647
UNII	007C07V77Z
CompTox Dashboard (EPA)	DTXSID8041668
- InChI: InChI=1S/C14H14/c1-3-7-13(8-4-1)11-12-14-9-5-2-6-10-14/h1-10H,11-12H2 Key: QWUWMCYKGHVNAV-UHFFFAOYSA-N; InChI=1/C14H14/c1-3-7-13(8-4-1)11-12-14-9-5-2-6-10-14/h1-10H,11-12H2 Key: QWUWMCYKGHVNAV-UHFFFAOYAL
- SMILES: c1ccc(cc1)CCc2ccccc2

Properties
Chemical formula	C_{14}H_{14}
Molar mass	182.266 g·mol^{−1}
Appearance	Crystalline solid
Density	0.9782 g/cm^{3}
Melting point	52.0 to 52.5 °C (125.6 to 126.5 °F; 325.1 to 325.6 K)
Boiling point	284 °C (543 °F; 557 K)
Solubility in water	Insoluble
Magnetic susceptibility (χ)	−126.8·10^{−6} cm^{3}/mol
- Except where otherwise noted, data are given for materials in their standard state (at 25 °C [77 °F], 100 kPa). verify (what is ?) Infobox references

Bibenzyl is the organic compound with the formula (C_{6}H_{5}CH_{2})_{2}. It can be viewed as a derivative of ethane in which one phenyl group is bonded to each carbon atom. It is a colorless solid.

== Occurrences ==
The compound is the product from the coupling of a pair of benzyl radicals.

Bibenzyl forms the central core of some natural products like dihydrostilbenoids and isoquinoline alkaloids. Marchantins are a family of bis(bibenzyl)-containing macrocycles.

== See also ==
- Benzil
- Benzoin
