= Crotaphatrema tchabalmbaboensis =

Conservation status
- Data Deficient (IUCN 3.1)

Scientific classification
- Kingdom: Animalia
- Phylum: Chordata
- Class: Amphibia
- Order: Gymnophiona
- Clade: Apoda
- Family: Scolecomorphidae
- Genus: Crotaphatrema
- Species: C. tchabalmbaboensis

Binomial name
- Crotaphatrema tchabalmbaboensis Lawson, 2000

Species of amphibian

Crotaphatrema tchabalmbaboensis is a species of caecilian in the family Scolecomorphidae, the tropical or African caecilians. It was discovered in 1997 on Mount Tchabal Mbabo in the Adamawa Plateau, western Cameroon, and described as a new species to science in 2000. Three specimens were collected at the type locality, and no individuals have been observed since.

== Description ==
This caecilian, the third species in the genus Crotaphatrema, is differentiated from the others by size, body shape, color pattern, and the lack of grooves on its collars.

The type series consists of two adult females measuring 298 and 338 mm (11.7 and 13.3 in) in total length, and a subadult female measuring 278 mm (10.9 in). The body width is 8–10 mm (0.3–0.4 in). The eyes are not visible externally. The dorsum is blue- black and the venter is cream. The border between the dorsal and ventral coloration has a serrated pattern.

== Habitat and conservation ==
The species is known only from the northern face of one mountain, where it was collected from forests on steep, sloping terrain at 1,950–2,000 m (6,400–6,560 ft) above sea level. It is not known if it can survive in the surrounding heavily grazed pastureland. Mount Tchabal Mbabo has been proposed as a national park, which provide protection for the species' forest habitat.

Crotaphatrema tchabalmbaboensis is only known from Mount Tchabal Mbabo, Cameroon
