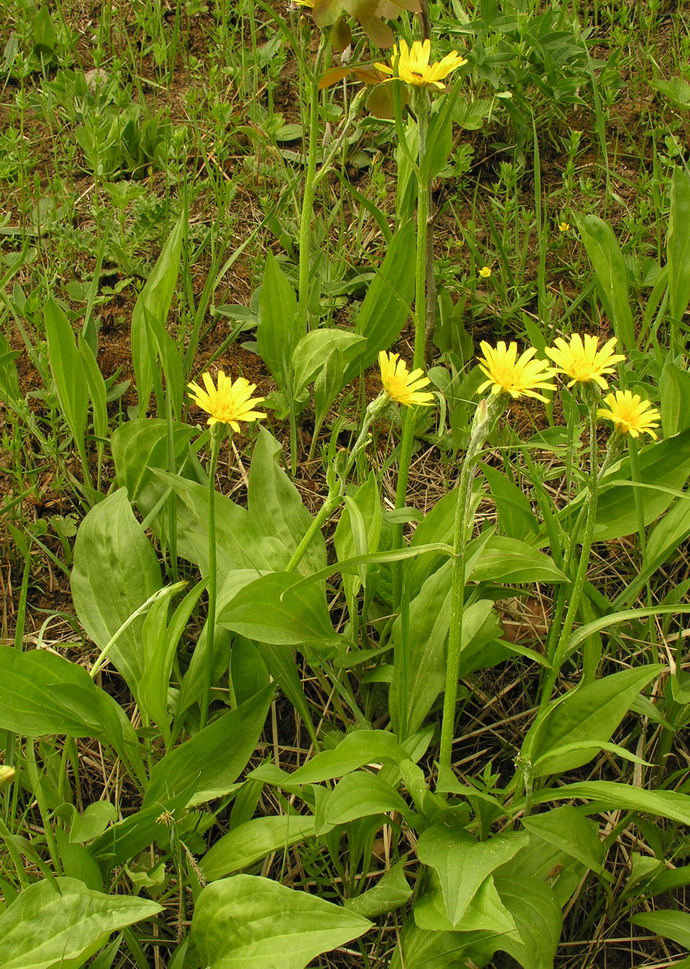

Scientific classification
- Kingdom: Plantae
- Clade: Tracheophytes
- Clade: Angiosperms
- Clade: Eudicots
- Clade: Asterids
- Order: Asterales
- Family: Asteraceae
- Genus: Scorzonera
- Species: S. humilis

Binomial name
- Scorzonera humilis L.

Synonyms
- List: Hieracium scorzoneroides E.H.L.Krause; Podospermum scorzoneroides Turcz. ex DC.; Pseudopodospermum inaequiscapum (Boiss.) Zaika, Sukhor. & N.Kilian; Scorzonera acuminata Boiss. & Balansa; Scorzonera ahmet-duranii Makbul & Coșkunç.; Scorzonera aksekiensis A.Duran & M.Öztürk; Scorzonera alpina Pollini; Scorzonera bohemica F.W.Schmidt; Scorzonera candollei Vis.; Scorzonera candollei subsp. tenuifolia (Schrad. ex DC.) Nyman; Scorzonera clusii Asso; Scorzonera glastifolia Hegetschw.; Scorzonera hispanica var. clusii (Asso) Pau; Scorzonera humilis var. angustifolia Hoffmanns. & Link; Scorzonera humilis var. macrorrhiza (Schleich. ex Gaudin) Rouy; Scorzonera humilis subf. nana J.Erikson; Scorzonera humilis var. plantaginea (Gaudin) Schur; Scorzonera humilis var. ramosa Hoffmanns. & Link; Scorzonera humilis subsp. tenuifolia (Schrad. ex DC.) Arcang.; Scorzonera inaequiscapa Boiss.; Scorzonera lanata Schrank; Scorzonera lanuginosa Baumg.; Scorzonera macrorrhiza Schleich. ex Gaudin; Scorzonera nervosa Lam.; Scorzonera plantaginea Gaudin; Scorzonera plantaginifolia Schleich.; Scorzonera tenuifolia Schrad.

= Scorzonera humilis =

Viper's grass

Species of plant

Scorzonera humilis, the viper's-grass, is a species of perennial plant. In Britain it is a rare plant, restricted to moist meadows, in Dorset and Warwick in England, and in South Wales.

One unique class of stilbenoid derivative was first isolated from S. humilis. They were named the tyrolobibenzyls after Tyrol in the eastern Alps, where the plant was collected.

== Description ==
It differs from goat's-beard, Tragopogon pratensis, in that it has short, pale green bracts, whereas in Goats Beard they are long and pointed.

It grows 7 to 50 cm.

The leaves are unbranched, elliptical-lanceolate.

The flower heads are 2.5 cm wide, and deep yellow in colour. Flowers from May until July.

The achenes are smooth ribbed, beakless, with similar pappus to Tragopogon pratensis.

It exudes a milky juice from its stem.
