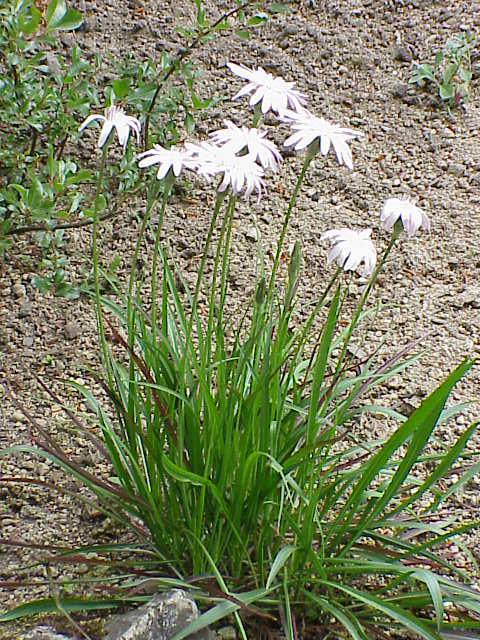
- Scorzonera purpurea

Scientific classification
- Kingdom: Plantae
- Clade: Embryophytes
- Clade: Tracheophytes
- Clade: Angiosperms
- Clade: Eudicots
- Clade: Asterids
- Order: Asterales
- Family: Asteraceae
- Subfamily: Cichorioideae
- Tribe: Cichorieae
- Subtribe: Scorzonerinae
- Genus: Scorzonera; L.

Synonyms
- List: Achyroseris Sch.Bip.; Arachnospermum F.W.Schmidt; Fleischeria Hochst. & Steud. ex Boiss.; Kilicia Yıld.; Podospermum DC.; Yildirimlia Kılıç

= Scorzonera =

Genus of flowering plants

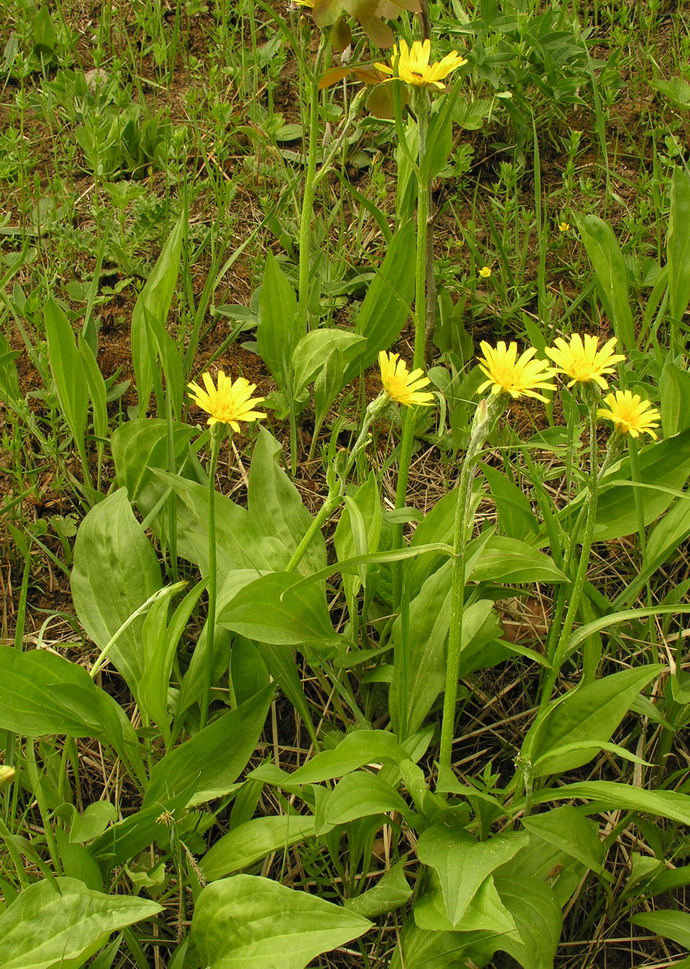
Scorzonera humilis

Scorzonera is a genus of flowering plants in the tribe Cichorieae within the family Asteraceae.

Species of the genus are found in Europe, Asia, and Africa. Its center of diversity is in the Mediterranean.

Scorzonera is recorded as a food plant for the larva of the nutmeg, a species of moth.

== Species ==
As of July 2026, Plants of the World Online accepted the following species:

- Scorzonera adilii A.Duran
- Scorzonera alaica Lipsch.
- Scorzonera alba R.R.Stewart
- Scorzonera albertoregelia C.Winkl.
- Scorzonera albicaulis Bunge
- Scorzonera alborzensis S.R.Safavi & Amini Rad
- Scorzonera alpigena (K.Koch) Grossh.
- Scorzonera angustifolia L.
- Scorzonera aniana N.Kilian
- Scorzonera argyrea Boiss.
- Scorzonera aristata Ramond ex DC.
- Scorzonera armeniaca (Boiss. & A.Huet) Boiss.
- Scorzonera boissieri Lipsch.
- Scorzonera bracteosa C.Winkl.
- Scorzonera bungei Krasch. & Lipsch.
- Scorzonera bupleurifolia Pouzolz ex Timb.-Lagr. & Jeanb.
- Scorzonera calcitrapifolia Vahl
- Scorzonera cana (C.A.Mey.) Griseb.
- Scorzonera charadzae Papava
- Scorzonera coriacea A.Duran & Aksoy
- Scorzonera crassicaulis Rech.f.
- Scorzonera dianthoides (Lipsch. & Krasch.) Lipsch.
- Scorzonera drarii V.Tackh.
- Scorzonera ekimii A.Duran
- Scorzonera franchetii Lipsch.
- Scorzonera gokcheoglui Ünal & Göktürk
- Scorzonera gorovanica Nazarova
- Scorzonera grigoraschvilii (Sosn.) Lipsch.
- Scorzonera grossheimii Lipsch. & Vassilcz.
- Scorzonera helodes Rech.f.
- Scorzonera hieraciifolia Hayek
- Scorzonera hondae Kitam.
- Scorzonera humilis L.
- Scorzonera idae (Sosn.) Lipsch.
- Scorzonera iliensis Krasch.
- Scorzonera isophylla Post
- Scorzonera ispahanica Boiss.
- Scorzonera joharchii S.R.Safavi
- Scorzonera karabelensis Parolly & N.Kilian
- Scorzonera karkasensis Safavi
- Scorzonera kirpicznikovii Lipsch.
- Scorzonera kozlowskyi Sosn. ex Grossh.
- Scorzonera lachnostegia (Woronow) Lipsch.
- Scorzonera laciniata L.
- Scorzonera lafranchisiana Kit Tan & Vold
- Scorzonera lindbergii Rech.f.
- Scorzonera luntaiensis C.Shih
- Scorzonera mariovoensis Micevski
- Scorzonera meshhedensis (Rech.f.) Rech.f.
- Scorzonera meyeri (K.Koch) Lipsch.
- Scorzonera pacis Güzel, Kayıkçı & S.Yıldız
- Scorzonera pamirica C.Shih
- Scorzonera parviflora Jacq.
- Scorzonera persepolitana Boiss.
- Scorzonera petrovii Lipsch.
- Scorzonera pulchra Lomak.
- Scorzonera purpurea L.
- Scorzonera racemosa Franch.
- Scorzonera radiata Fisch. ex Ledeb.
- Scorzonera radicosa Boiss.
- Scorzonera renzii Rech.f.
- Scorzonera rosea Waldst. & Kit.
- Scorzonera rupicola Hausskn. ex Bornm.
- Scorzonera safievii Grossh.
- Scorzonera schischkinii Lipsch. & Vassilcz.
- Scorzonera schweinfurthii Boiss.
- Scorzonera scopariiformis Lipsch.
- Scorzonera scyria M.A.Gust. & Snogerup
- Scorzonera serpentinica Rech.f.
- Scorzonera sinensis (Lipsch. & Krasch.) Nakai
- Scorzonera songorica (Kar. & Kir.) Lipsch. & Vassilcz.
- Scorzonera sublanata Lipsch.
- Scorzonera tadshikorum Krasch. & Lipsch.
- Scorzonera taiwanensis S.S.Ying
- Scorzonera tragopogonoides Regel & Schmalh.
- Scorzonera transiliensis Popov
- Scorzonera tuberculata J.Thiébaut
- Scorzonera turkestanica Franch.
- Scorzonera tuzgoluensis A.Duran, B.Doğan & Makbul
- Scorzonera vavilovii Kult.
- Scorzonera verrucosa Boiss.
- Scorzonera virgata DC.
- Scorzonera yemensis Podlech
- Scorzonera yildirimlii A.Duran & Hamzaoğlu
- Scorzonera zorkunensis Coșkunç. & Makbul

Species formerly placed in the genus include:

- Scorzonera fistulosa Brot. = Avellara fistulosa (Brot.) Blanca & C.Díaz
- Scorzonera judaica Eig = Gelasia psychrophila (Boiss. & Hausskn.) Zaika, Sukhor. & N.Kilian

== Etymology ==
The name of the genus (Scorzonera) has an uncertain etymology; it may derive from multiple roots such as Old French "scorzon", Italian "scorsone", and Spanish "escorzonera", meaning “black rind”; but also viper, perhaps from the use of its roots as an antidote to snake bites, or from the Catalan "escurçonera", derived from "escurçó", i.e. viper.

== Secondary metabolites ==
Some Scorzonera species contain lactones, including members of the guaianolide class of sesquiterpene lactones. Flavonoids found in Scorzonera include apigenin, kaempferol, luteolin, and quercetin. Other secondary metabolites reported from the genus include caffeoylquinic acids, coumarins, lignans, stilbenoids, and triterpenoids. One unique class of stilbenoid derivative was first isolated from Scorzonera humilis. They were named the tyrolobibenzyls after Tyrol in the eastern Alps, where the plant was collected.
