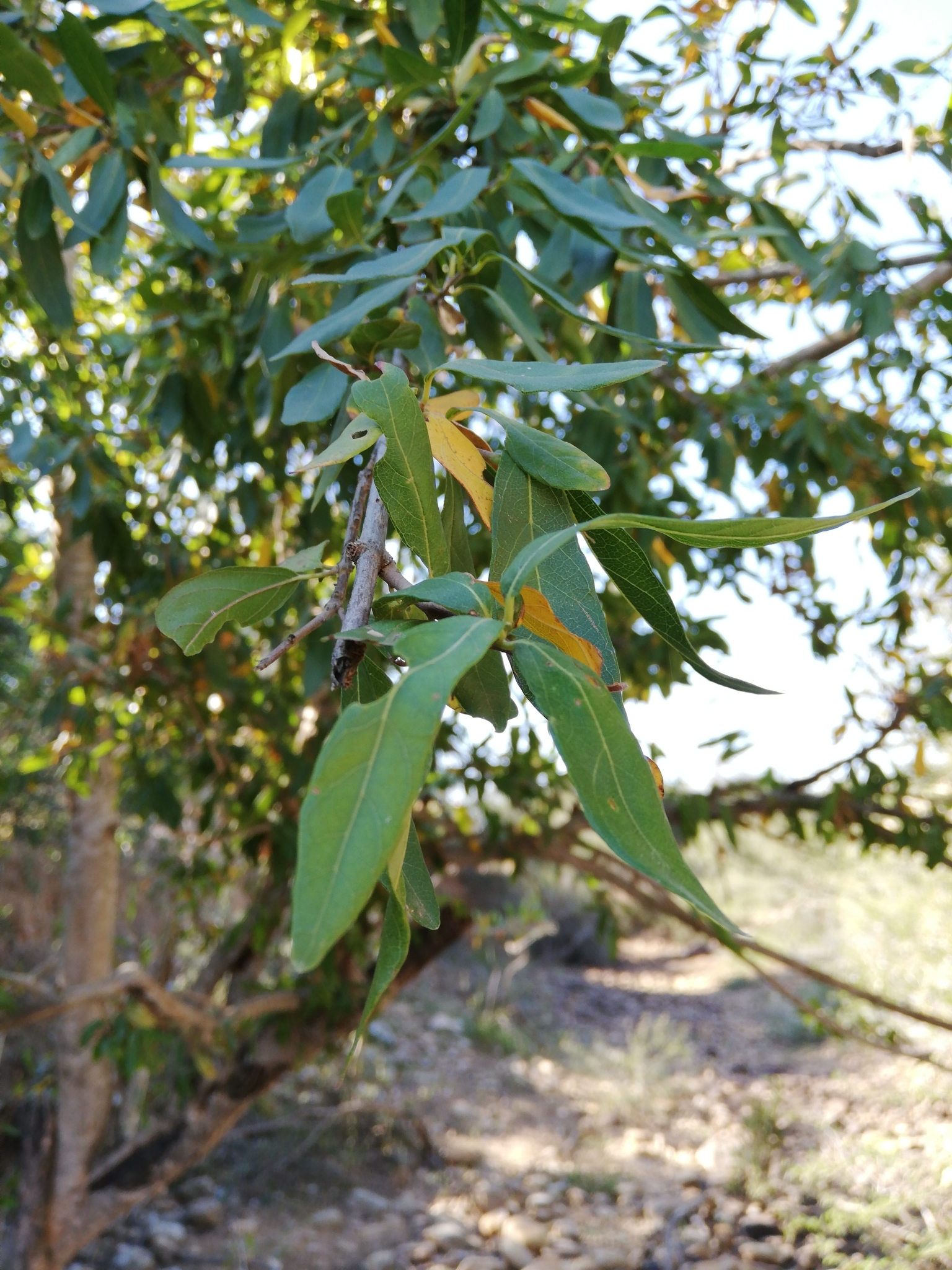

Conservation status
- Least Concern (IUCN 3.1)

Scientific classification
- Kingdom: Plantae
- Clade: Tracheophytes
- Clade: Angiosperms
- Clade: Eudicots
- Clade: Rosids
- Order: Myrtales
- Family: Combretaceae
- Genus: Combretum
- Species: C. afrum

Binomial name
- Combretum afrum (Eckl. & Zeyh.) Kuntze

Synonyms
- Dodonaea afra Eckl. & Zeyh.; Combretum salicifolium E.Mey. ex Hook.; Dodonaea conglomerata Eckl. & Zeyh.; Dodonaea dubia Eckl. & Zeyh.; Combretum caffrum

= Combretum afrum =

Species of flowering plant

Combretum afrum, commonly known as Cape bushwillow, is a species of tree native to South Africa. It is endemic to the Cape Provinces.

== Biochemistry ==
Combretastatin A-4

In C. afrum, combretastatins A-1, A-4 and B-1 can be found.

== Taxonomy ==
The etymology of the original species name caffrum is related to kaffir, an ethnic slur used towards black people in Africa. At the July 2024 International Botanical Congress, a vote was held with the result that "caffrum" related names will be emended to afrum related ones, with the implementation of this happening by the end of July 2024.
