= Ombrabulin =

Names
- IUPAC name N^{1}-{2-Methoxy-5-[(Z)-2-(3,4,5-trimethoxyphenyl)ethen-1-yl]phenyl}-L-serinamide
- Systematic IUPAC name (2S)-2-Amino-3-hydroxy-N-{2-methoxy-5-[(Z)-2-(3,4,5-trimethoxyphenyl)ethen-1-yl]phenyl}propanamide
- Other names AVE-8062; AVE-8062A; AC7700; CS-39-L-Ser.HCl

Identifiers
| CAS Number | 181816-48-8; 253426-24-3 (HCl) |
| 3D model (JSmol) | Interactive image |
| ChemSpider | 5293602 |
| PubChem CID | 6918405; 6918404 (HCl) |
| UNII | 82JB1524Q6; KXZ9NDO6H0 (HCl) |
| CompTox Dashboard (EPA) | DTXSID50939477 |
- InChI: InChI=1S/C21H26N2O6/c1-26-17-8-7-13(9-16(17)23-21(25)15(22)12-24)5-6-14-10-18(27-2)20(29-4)19(11-14)28-3/h5-11,15,24H,12,22H2,1-4H3,(H,23,25)/b6-5-/t15-/m0/s1 Key: IXWNTLSTOZFSCM-YVACAVLKSA-N; InChI=1/C21H26N2O6/c1-26-17-8-7-13(9-16(17)23-21(25)15(22)12-24)5-6-14-10-18(27-2)20(29-4)19(11-14)28-3/h5-11,15,24H,12,22H2,1-4H3,(H,23,25)/b6-5-/t15-/m0/s1 Key: IXWNTLSTOZFSCM-YVACAVLKBS
- SMILES: COC1=C(C=C(C=C1)/C=C\C2=CC(=C(C(=C2)OC)OC)OC)NC(=O)[C@H](CO)N

Properties
| Chemical formula | C_{21}H_{26}N_{2}O_{6} |
| Molar mass | 402.447 g·mol^{−1} |
- Except where otherwise noted, data are given for materials in their standard state (at 25 °C [77 °F], 100 kPa). verify (what is ?) Infobox references

Ombrabulin was an experimental drug candidate discovered by Ajinomoto and further developed by Sanofi-Aventis. Ombrabulin is a combretastatin A-4 derivative that exerts its antitumor effect by disrupting the formation of blood vessels needed for tumor growth.

It was granted orphan drug status by the European Medicines Agency in April 2011.

In January 2013, Sanofi said it discontinued development of ombrabulin after disappointing results from phase III clinical trials.
