= Joseph Friedrich Nicolaus Bornmüller =

German botanist (1862–1948)

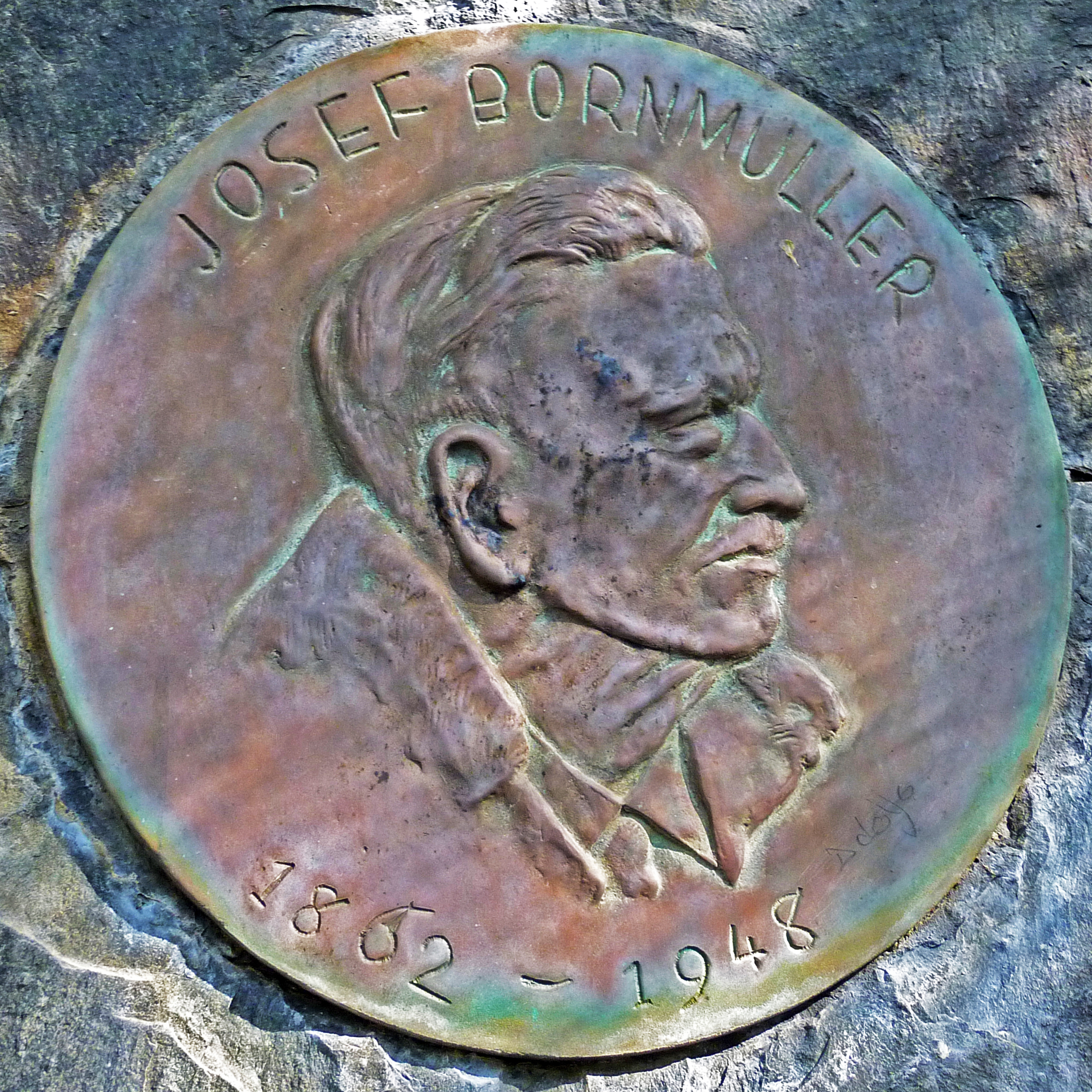
Joseph Bornmüller

Joseph Friedrich Nicolaus Bornmüller (February 6, 1862 – December 19, 1948) was a German botanist born in Hildburghausen, Thuringia.

== Biography ==
He studied horticulture in Potsdam, and in 1886 traveled to the Balkans and Greece on his first botanical expedition. In 1887-88 he worked at the botanical garden in Belgrade, and during his subsequent career conducted botanical studies widely throughout the Middle East, Asia Minor and North Africa. In his research, he also visited Greece, Madeira and the Canary Islands.

In 1903 he succeeded Heinrich Carl Haussknecht (1838–1903) as curator of the "Haussknecht Herbarium" at Weimar, a position he maintained until 1938. Starting with 1888 he curated and distributed about 25 large series of duplicate specimens which resemble exsiccatae. The specimens have collection numbers on printed labels and are found in major herbaria. The series are entitled with reference to his expeditions, e.g., Plantae exsiccatae Serbiae meridionalis 1888, Iter Persico-turcicum. 1892-93 and Lydiae et Cariae plantae exsiccatae 1906.

In 1918 he was awarded an honorary professorship from the University of Jena.

Among Bornmüller's many publications was a treatise on Macedonian flora titled Beiträge zur Flora Mazedoniens (1925–1928).

== Eponymy ==
The plant genus Bornmuellerantha from the family Scrophulariaceae; the plant genus Bornmuellera from the family Brassicaceae; the plant species Allium bornmuelleri, Geocaryum bornmuelleri, and Paronychia bornmuelleri; the venomous viper species Montivipera bornmuelleri; the caecilian species Crotaphatrema bornmuelleri, and the rust Puccinia bornmuelleri are named in his honor. There is also a small group of Mediterranean orchids named in his honour, i.e. Ophrys bornmuelleri (a.k.a. Bornmüller's Ophrys or Bornmüller's Bee Orchid).
