= Heinrich Carl Haussknecht =

German botanist (1838–1903)

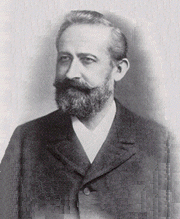
Heinrich Carl Haussknecht (1838–1903)

Heinrich Carl Haussknecht (30 November 1838 – 7 July 1903) was a German pharmacist and botanical collector who was a native of Bennungen, Sachsen-Anhalt.

Trained as a pharmacist, Haussknecht is remembered for collecting and describing numerous species of plants. His botanical explorations took place in Thuringia, Lower Saxony, Greece and the Middle East (the present-day nations of Turkey, Syria, Iraq, Iran), where he discovered, among others Tulipa aleppensis. He established a large herbarium in Weimar, which after his death was placed under the supervision of Joseph Friedrich Nicolaus Bornmüller (1862–1948). In 1949, the "Herbarium Haussknecht" was transferred to the University of Jena.

Haussknecht specialized in the study of the genus Epilobium from the botanical family Onagraceae. In 1884 he published a monograph on the genus called Monographie der Gattung Epilobium. The botanical genus Haussknechtia was named in his honour by Pierre Edmond Boissier (1810–1885) in 1872. Also he was honoured in Ferula haussknechtii Wolff ex Rech. f. in 1952.

Haussknecht distributed several large series of dried plant specimens, all not being exsiccatae in the strong sense, but listed by IndExs – Index of Exsiccatae. The series are entitled with reference to his expeditions, e.g., Iter Syriaco-Armeniarum (1864–1866) and Iter orientale (1867–1868).
