= Marakele National Park =

National park in Limpopo Province, South Africa

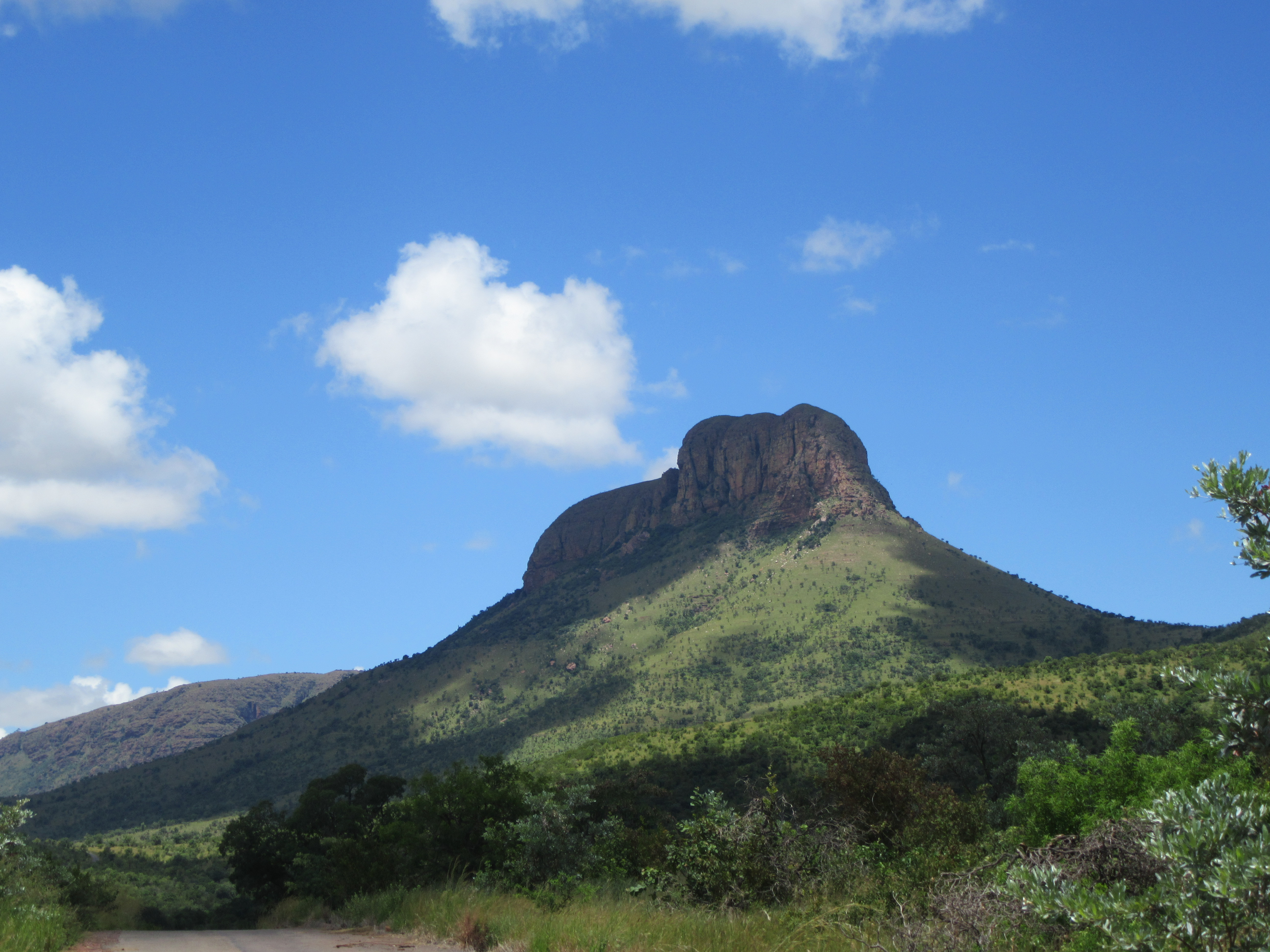
- View of the Waterberg massif, Marakele National Park
- Location of the park
- Location: Limpopo, South Africa
- Nearest city: Thabazimbi
- Coordinates: 24°23′07″S 27°38′08″E
- Area: 670 km^{2} (260 sq mi)
- Established: 1994; 32 years ago
- Governing body: South African National Parks
- Website: www.sanparks.org/parks/marakele
- Marakele National Park (South Africa)

Marakele National Park is a National Park, part of the Waterberg Biosphere in Limpopo Province, South Africa.

== Flora and fauna ==
Marakele is home to the big five (buffalo did not exist in the park, but 20 disease-free buffalo (nine cows and eleven bulls) were re-introduced on 15 October 2013) as well as sixteen species of antelopes and over 250 species of birds, including the largest colony of Cape vultures in the world (around 800 breeding pairs). The Matlabas River runs through the park.

=== Birds found within the park are ===
- African harrier-hawk
- African scops owl
- Cape rock thrush
- Cape vulture
- Fiery-necked nightjar
- Freckled nightjar
- Jackal buzzard
- Purple roller
- Red-eyed bulbul
- Southern boubou
- Snake eagle species
- Lesser spotted eagle
- Wahlberg’s eagle

=== Mammals found within the park are ===
- Black rhinoceros
- Brown hyena
- Chacma baboon
- Elephant
- Hyena
- Impala
- Kudu
- African leopard
- Lion
- Sable
- Vervet monkey
- Waterbuck
- White rhinoceros

=== Vegetation ===
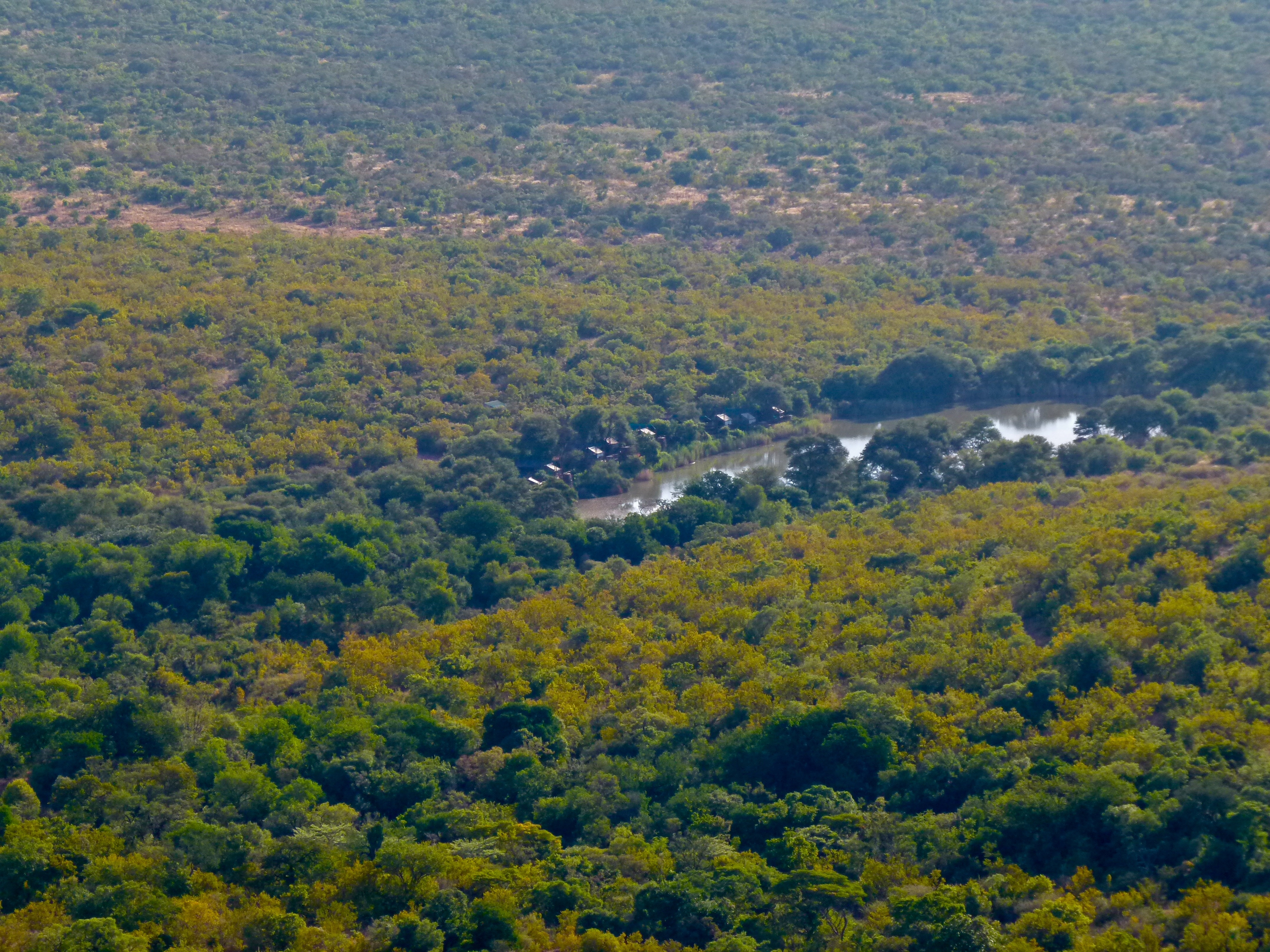
The Apiesrivierpoort Forest on the south-eastern bank of the Apiesrivierpoort Dam (Tlopi Dam)

The park contains a mix of vegetation types representative of fynbos and forest systems, with half the park covered by Waterberg Moist Bushveld and 42% covered by Mixed Bushveld. The 8-hectare Apiesrivierpoort Forest is found to the east of Tlopi Dam. The forest is mainly composed of Red ivory and African olive; other plant species found within the forest are:

- Celtis africana
- Maytenus undata
- Schotia brachypetala
- Chaetacme aristata
- Mimusops zeyheri
- Syzygium guineense
- Green-twigged jackal-coffee (Empogona lanceolata)
- Carex spicatopaniculata
- Suregada africana
- Acokanthera oppositifolia
- Pappea capensis
- Diospyros whyteana
- Calpurnia aurea

Other significant plant species found in the park:

- Waterberg agapanthus (Agapanthus coddii), rare and endemic to the region
- Encephalartos eugene-maraisii, endangered cycad

== History ==
The area now constituting Marakele was home to several iron-age settlements which are not yet open to public viewing. Prior to its foundation as a National Park, it was home to naturalist Eugène Marais. Marakele was founded as Kransberg National Park in 1994 with the purchase of 150 square kilometres (58 sq mi), and was shortly after renamed to its current name. By 1999, the park had expanded to 670 square kilometres (260 sq mi).

== Activities ==
The park is accessible to all passenger vehicles, with the camp and tent sites on good roads. Also, approximately 80 km of roads within the park are accessible to all vehicles, with the remaining requiring a four-wheel drive vehicle. There is a 4x4 eco trail, along with morning and sunset game drives.

A tarred mountain pass leads up to the top of the Waterberg massif.

The park contains bird hides, picnic sites and multiple viewing points at the Bollonoto, Bontle and Tlopi dams.

There are morning and sunset bush walks.

There is an annual birding census organised by the Marakele Honorary rangers.

== Accommodation ==
Two tented camps are laid out in Marakele, namely Tlopi and Bontle.

=== Bontle Camping Site ===
Bontle has 36 camping spots, along with 10 tented units.

=== Tlopi Tented Camp ===
Tlopi is situated on the banks of the Apiesrivierpoort Dam.

== Gallery ==
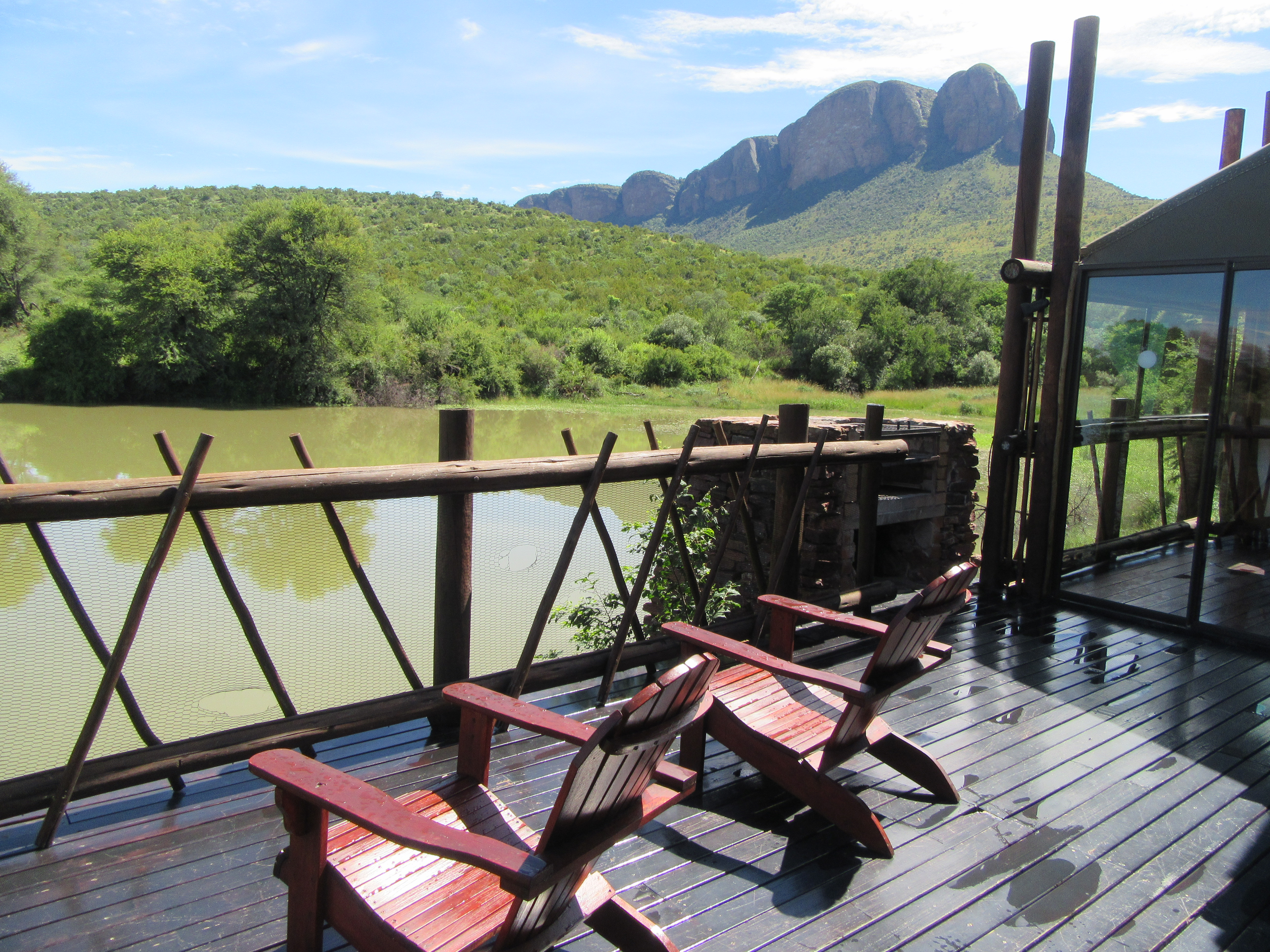
Tlopi Tented Camp

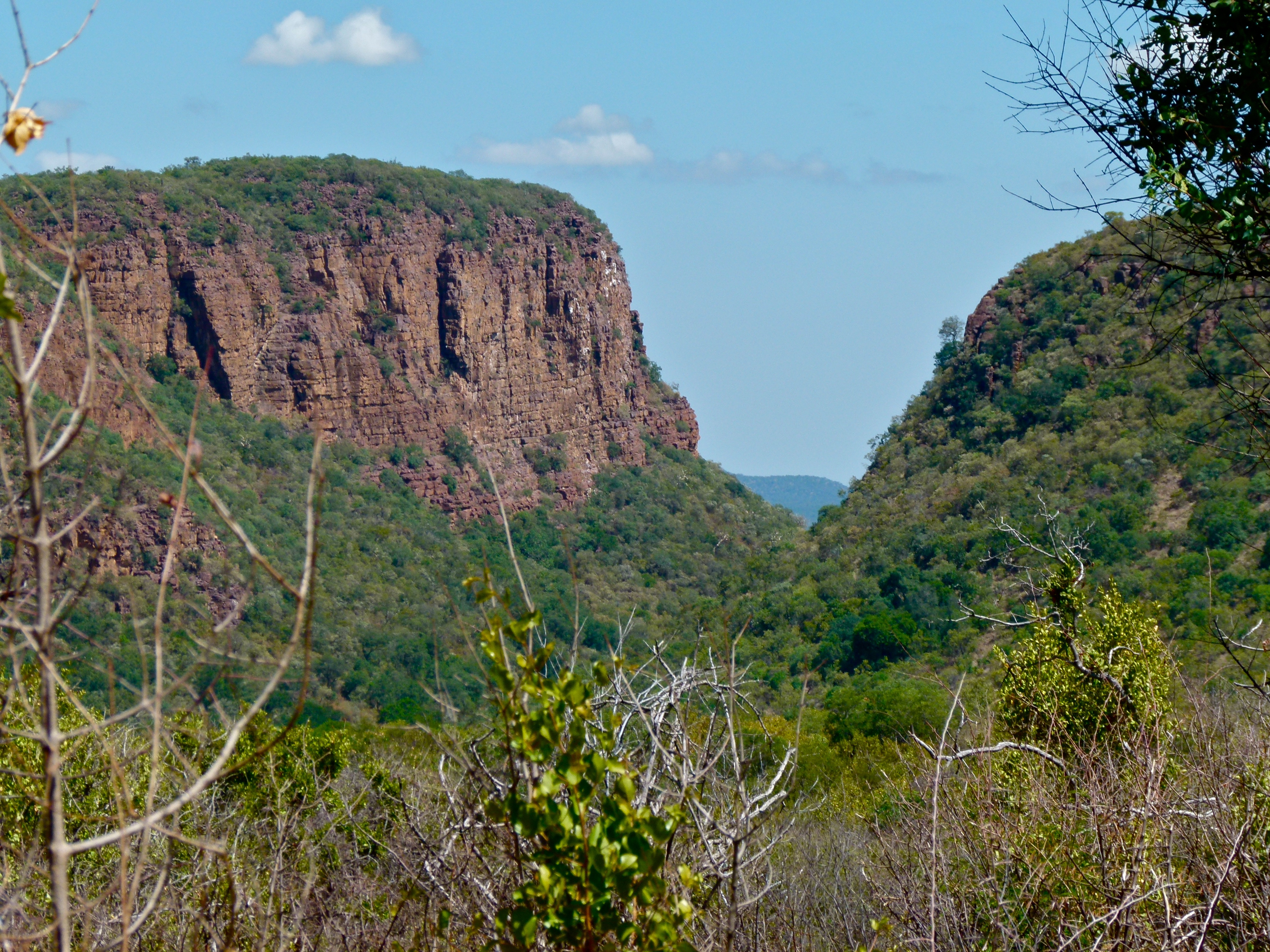

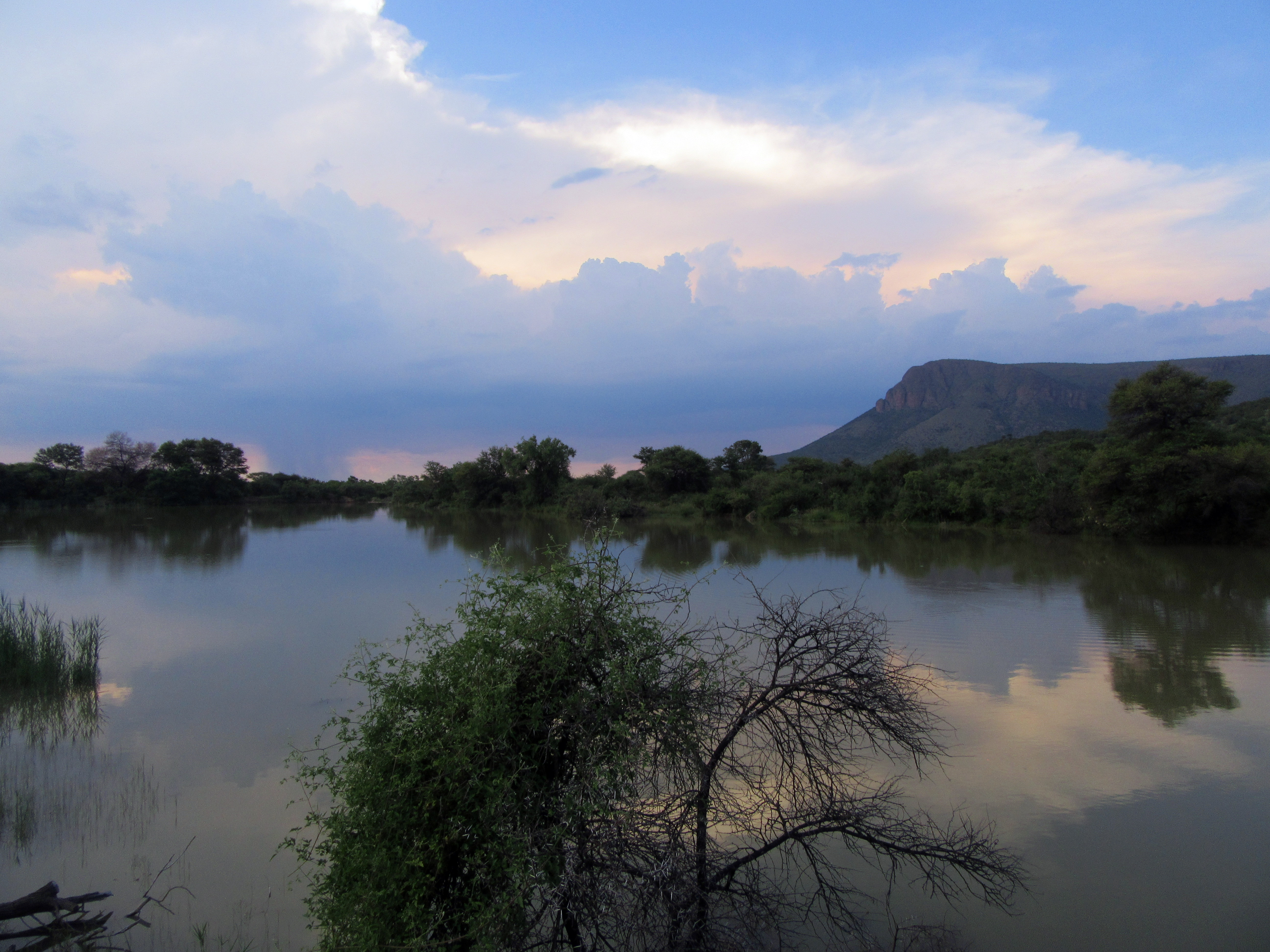
Sunset at Tlopi Dam

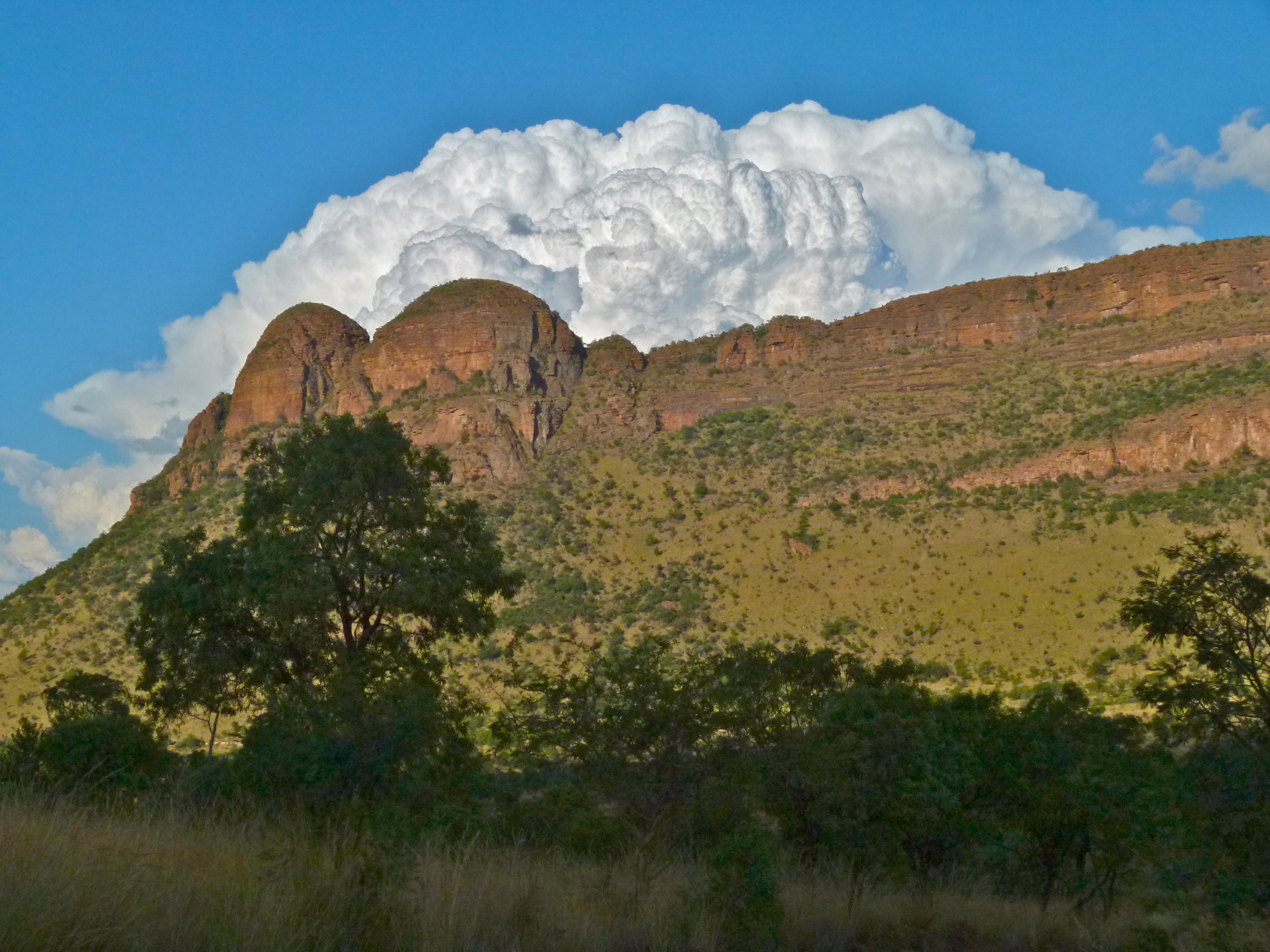

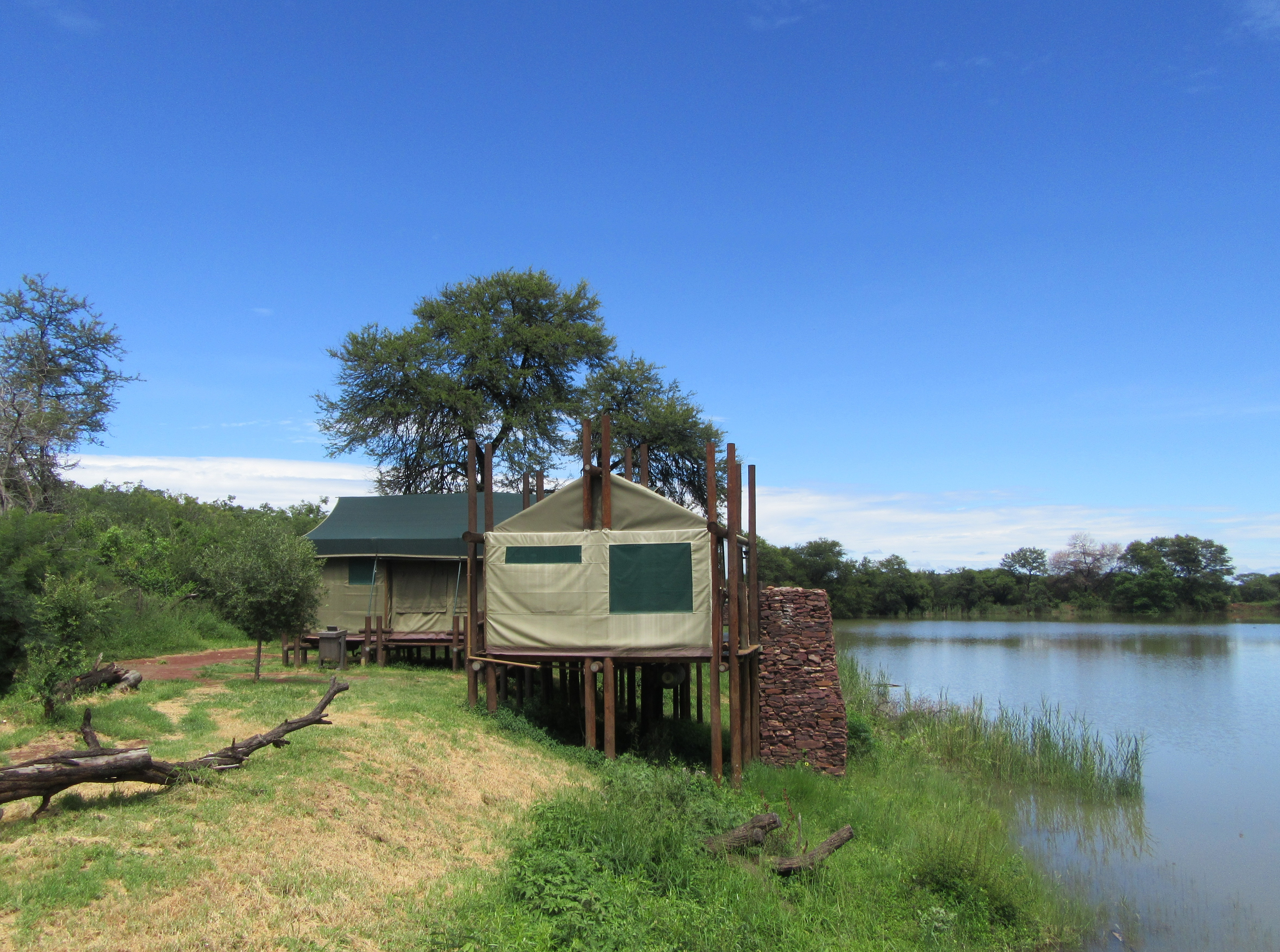
Safari Tent Tlopi Tented Camp on the Tlopi Dam

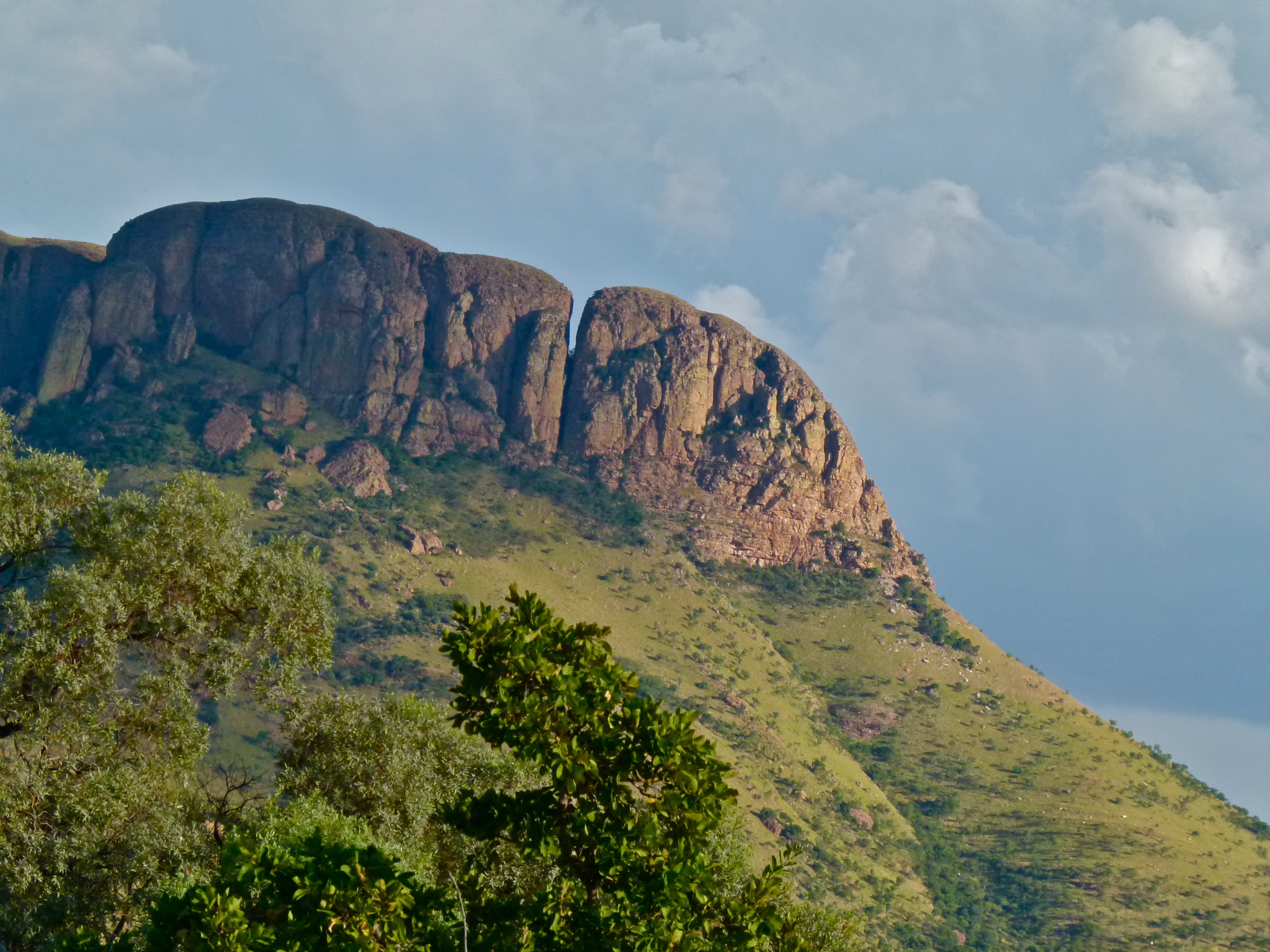

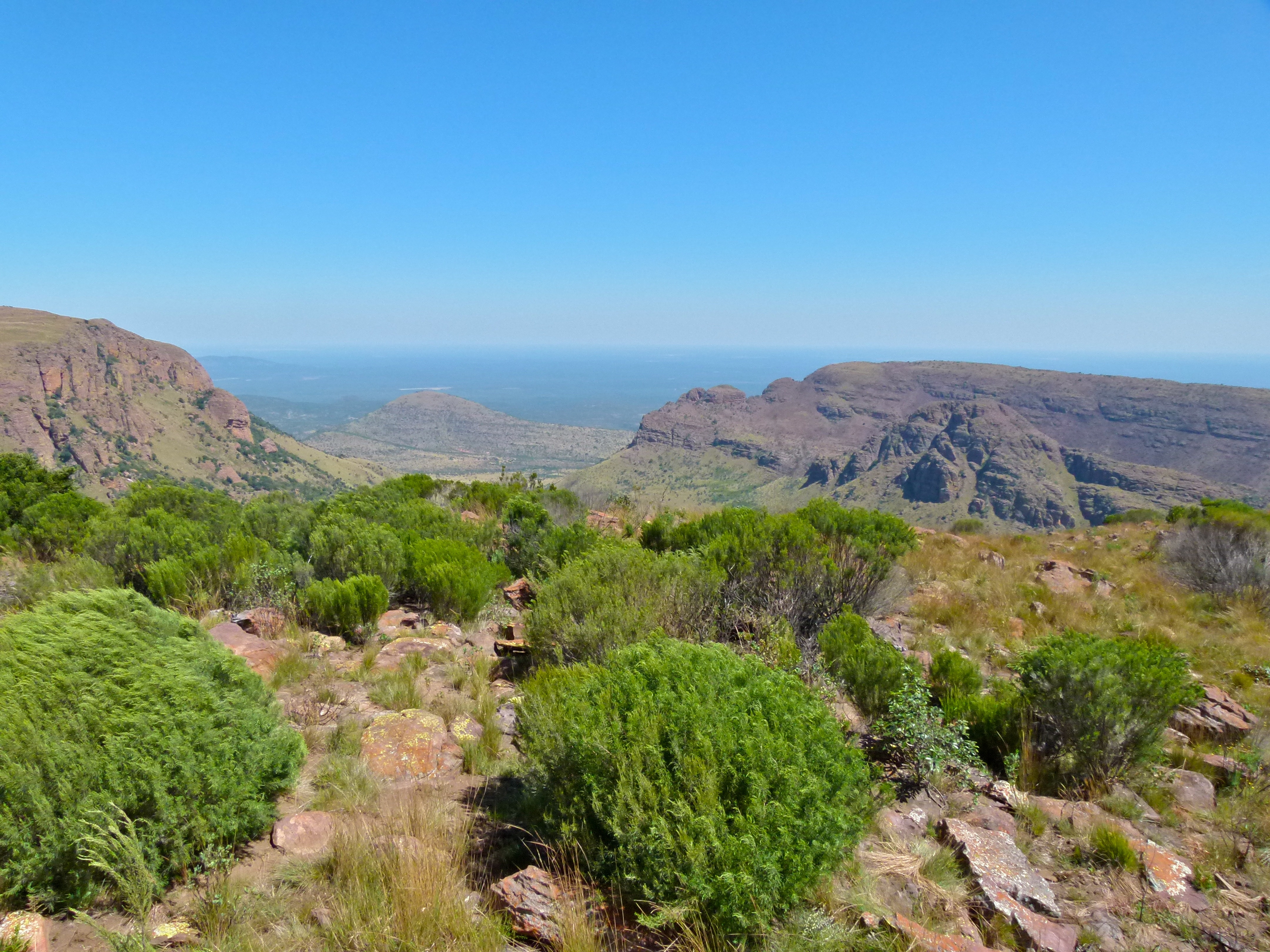
View from the Lenong viewpoint

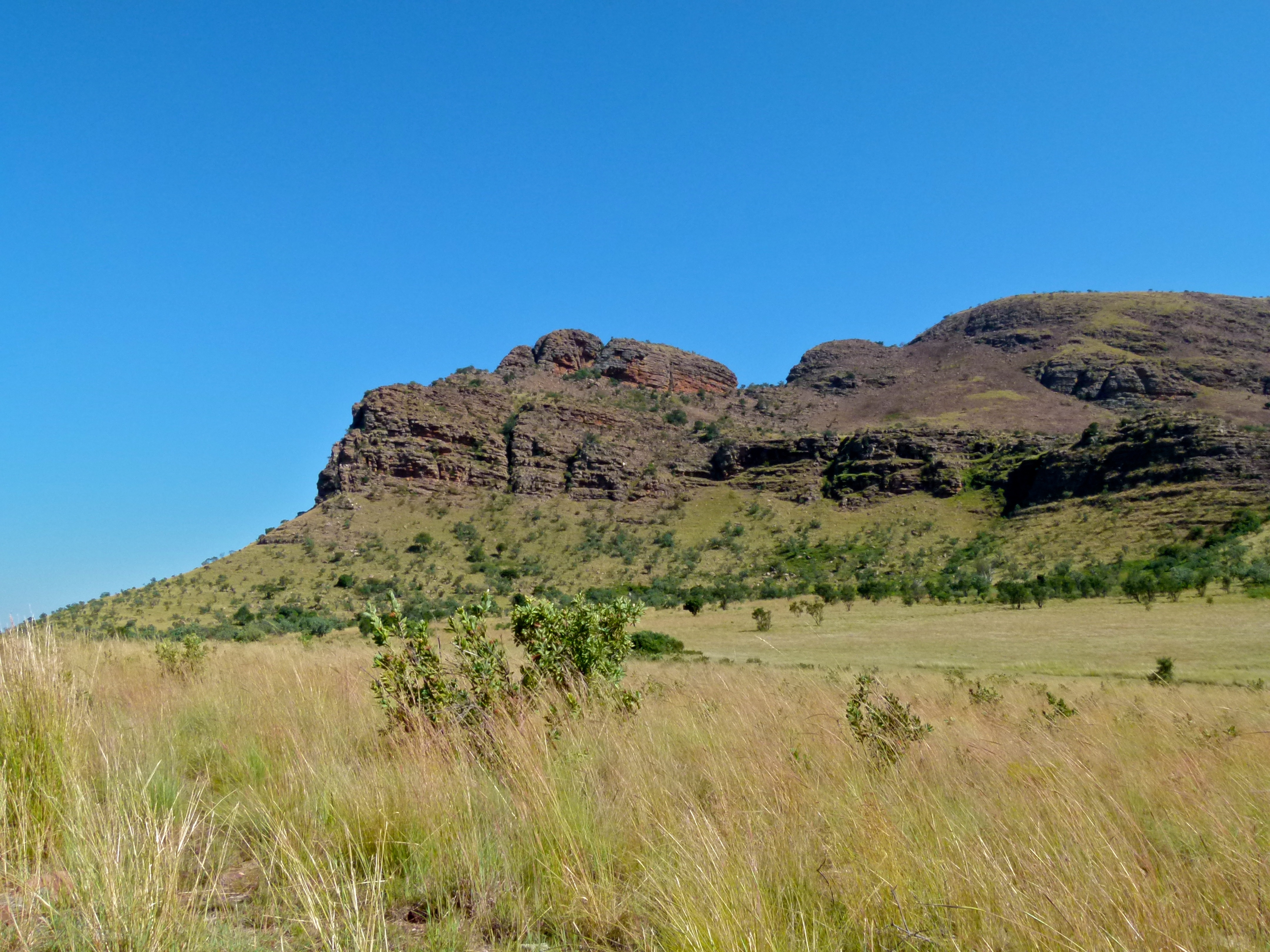
