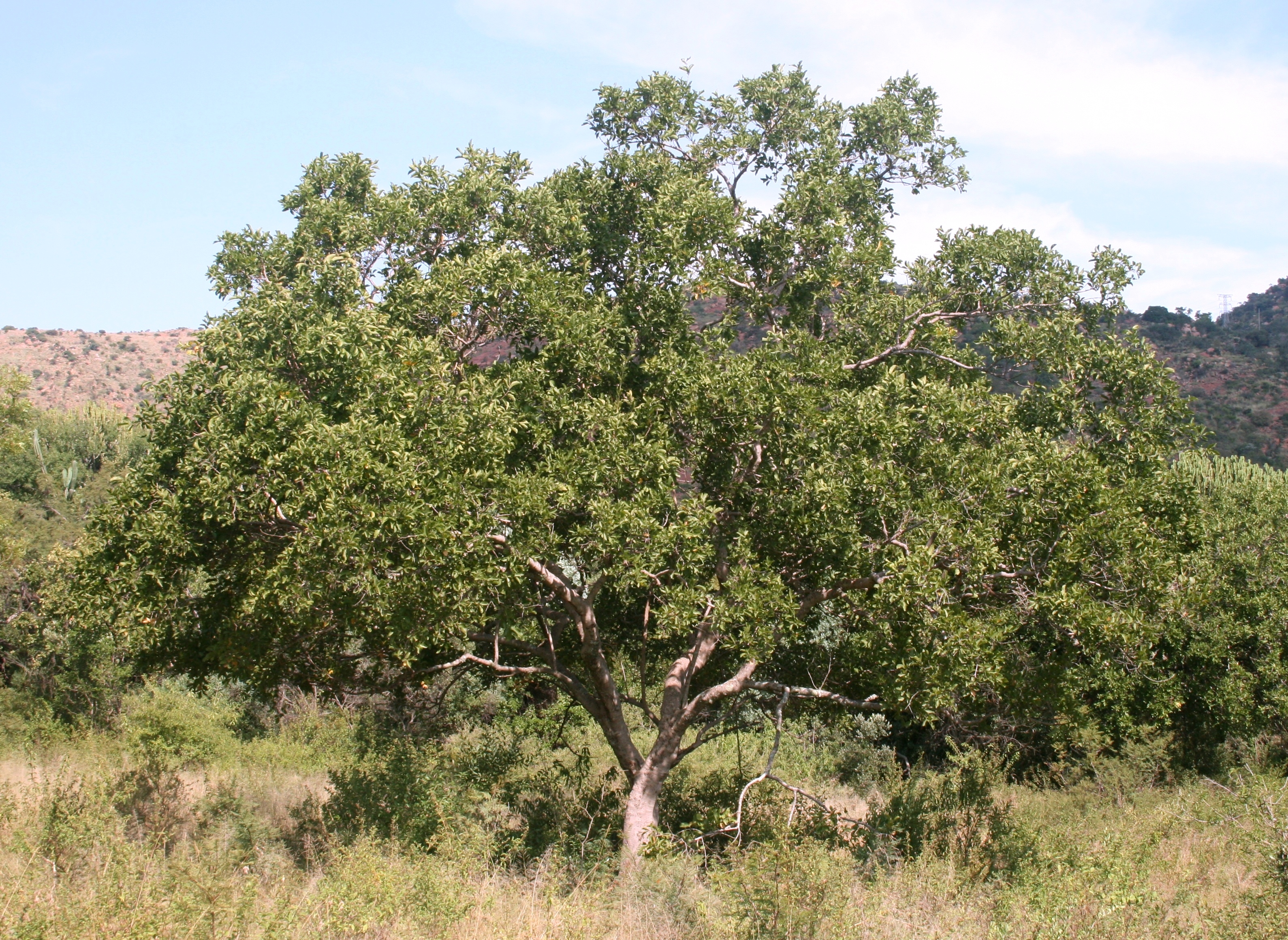
- Near Johannesburg
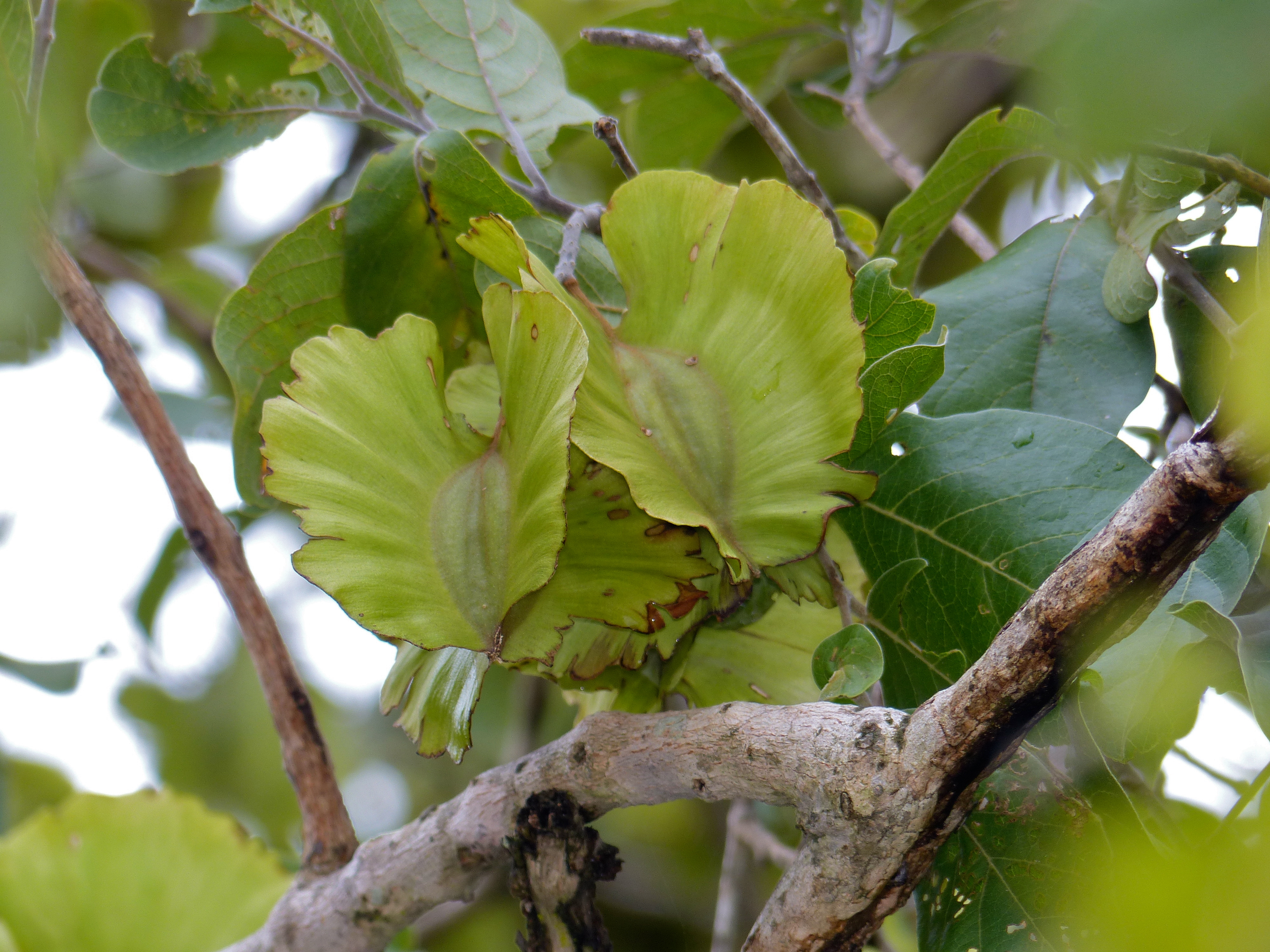
- Winged fruit

Scientific classification
- Kingdom: Plantae
- Clade: Tracheophytes
- Clade: Angiosperms
- Clade: Eudicots
- Clade: Rosids
- Order: Myrtales
- Family: Combretaceae
- Genus: Combretum
- Species: C. zeyheri

Binomial name
- Combretum zeyheri Sond.

Synonyms
- List: Combretum antunesii Engl. & Diels; Combretum bragae Engl.; Combretum calocarpum Gilg ex Suess.; Combretum dilembense De Wild.; Combretum glandulosum F.Hoffm.; Combretum lopolense Engl. & Diels; Combretum oblongum F.Hoffm.; Combretum odontopetalum Engl. & Diels; Combretum platycarpum Engl. & Diels; Combretum sankisiense De Wild.; Combretum sinuatipetalum De Wild.; Combretum teuszii Engl. & Diels; Combretum tinctorum Welw. ex M.A.Lawson

= Combretum zeyheri =

Species of plant

Combretum zeyheri, the large-fruited bushwillow or Zeyher's bushwillow, is a species of flowering plant in the family Combretaceae, usually found growing on acidic or sandy soils in tropical African savannas. A small to medium-sized tree, its roots are used as a source of material for making baskets and as a traditional medicine for haemorrhoids.

Two interlocking wooden logs from a large-fruited bushwillow, connected by a notch, comprise the Kalambo structure. Located at Kalambo Falls, Zambia, and dating to roughly 476,000 years ago, the Kalambo structure is the oldest known wooden structure.

== Etymology ==
The species epithet honours Karl Zeyher (1799–1858), a German botanical and entomological collector active in the Cape Colony from 1822 until his death during the local smallpox epidemic of 1858. Other taxa bearing his name include Erythrina zeyheri, Mimusops zeyheri, Phyllogeiton zeyheri, and Stachys zeyheri.
