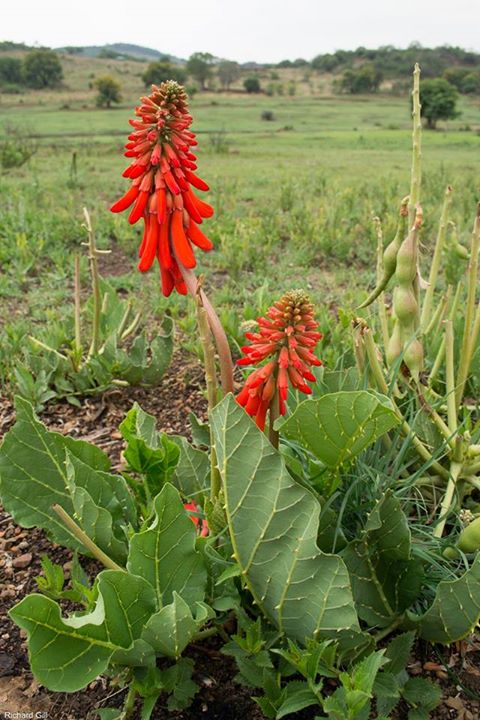

Scientific classification
- Kingdom: Plantae
- Clade: Tracheophytes
- Clade: Angiosperms
- Clade: Eudicots
- Clade: Rosids
- Order: Fabales
- Family: Fabaceae
- Subfamily: Faboideae
- Genus: Erythrina
- Species: E. zeyheri

Binomial name
- Erythrina zeyheri Harv.

Synonyms
- Corallodendron zeyheri (Harv.) Kuntze

= Erythrina zeyheri =

Ploughbreaker

Species of legume

Erythrina zeyheri, commonly known as the ploughbreaker, is a deciduous, geoxylic subshrub and member of the family Fabaceae. It is endemic to southern Africa. It grows no more than 60 cm tall and occurs naturally in the higher elevation grasslands of South Africa's central plateau, and that of adjacent Lesotho. They favour deep clay soil in the vicinity of creeks and marshes, and often form colonies.

== Description ==
It is a geoxylic plant, sometimes called an "underground tree", that produces annual stems, some 50 to 60 cm long. It has glabrous, leathery, trifoliolate leaves with large leaflets. The rachis and main leaf venation, which are prominently raised below, are armed with recurved spines on both leaf surfaces. The petioles and stems are likewise armed to discourage browsers. The shoots and leaves are deciduous, dying away during harsh highveld winters, when the plant survives as an extensive woody, tuberous rootstock.

The upright inflorescences appear in summer, with the leaves, from October to January. The drooping scarlet, or rarely white flowers, are capped by a red calyxes. Their fruit are smooth black pods when mature, each containing a few large (1.0 to 1.7 cm long) seeds. These are hard and orange-red in colour.

== Foodplant ==
It is a foodplant for the moth Terastia margaritis.

== Etymology ==
The species epithet honours Karl Zeyher (1799–1858), a German botanical and entomological collector active in the Cape Colony from 1822 until his death during the local smallpox epidemic of 1858. Other taxa bearing his name include Combretum zeyheri, Mimusops zeyheri, Phyllogeiton zeyheri, and Stachys zeyheri.

== Gallery ==
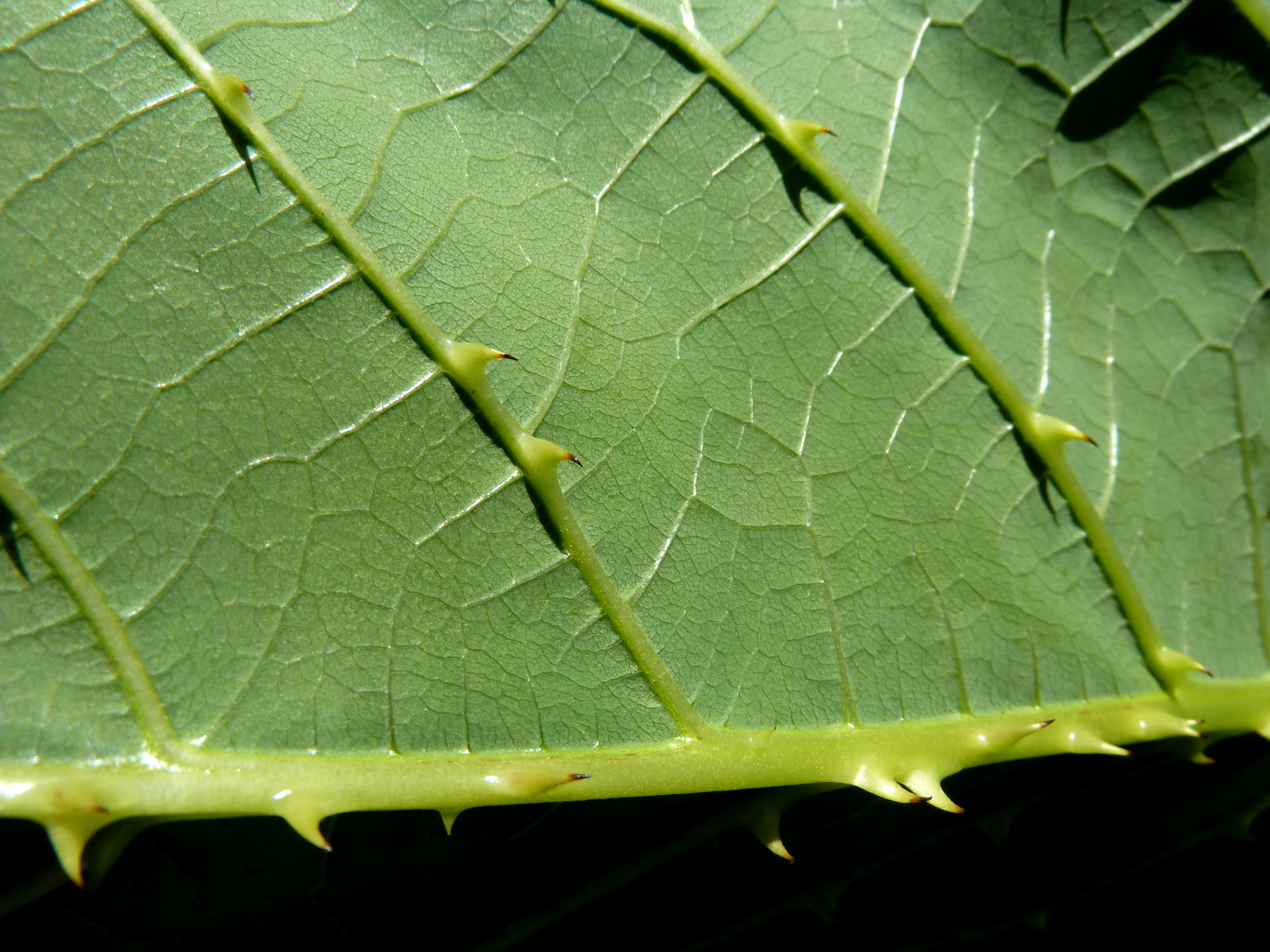
Abaxial leaf surface armed with recurved spines on main veins

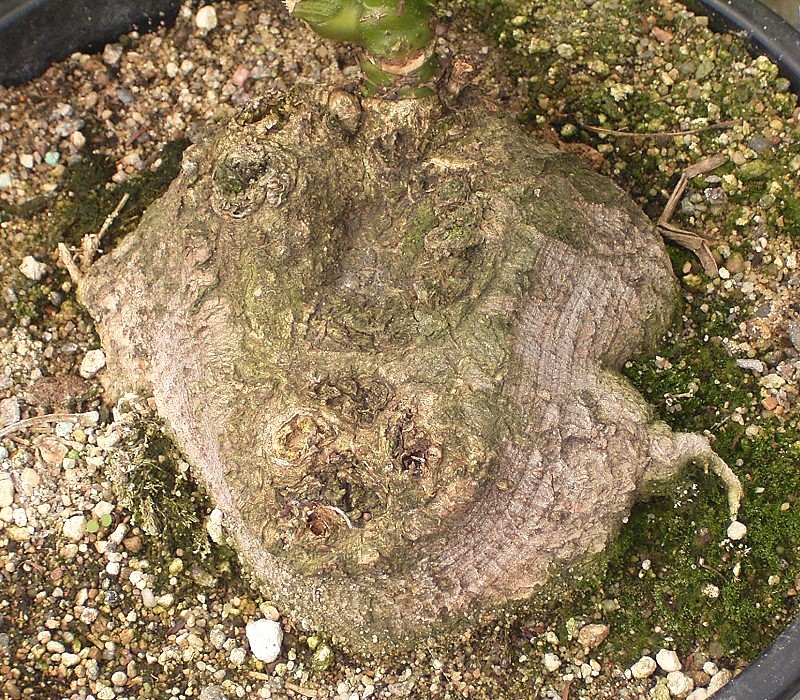
The perennial tuberous rootstock

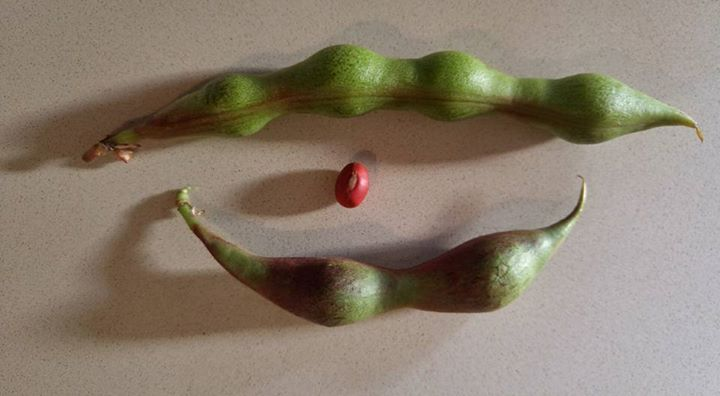
Green pods and seed

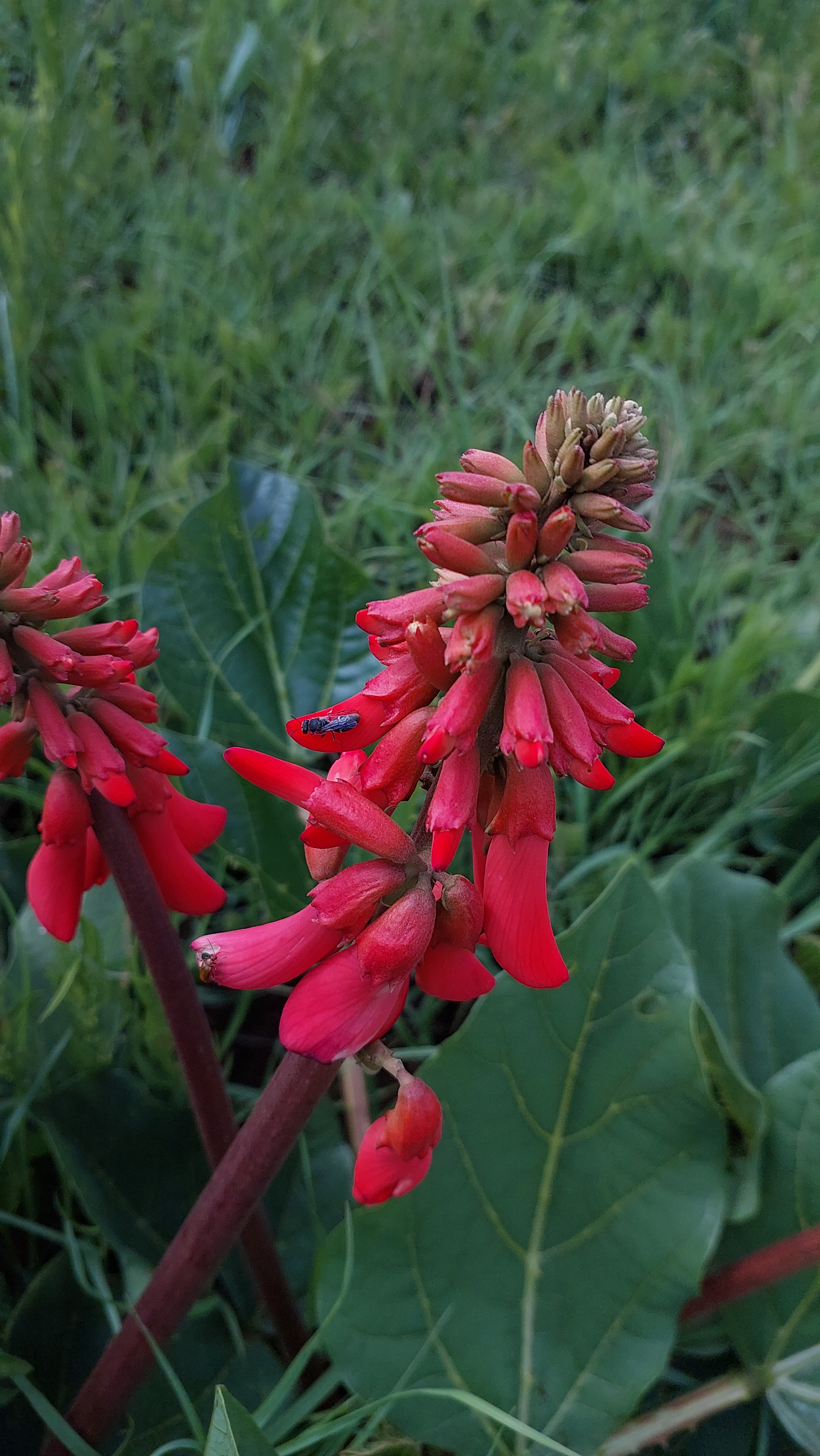
Inflorescence

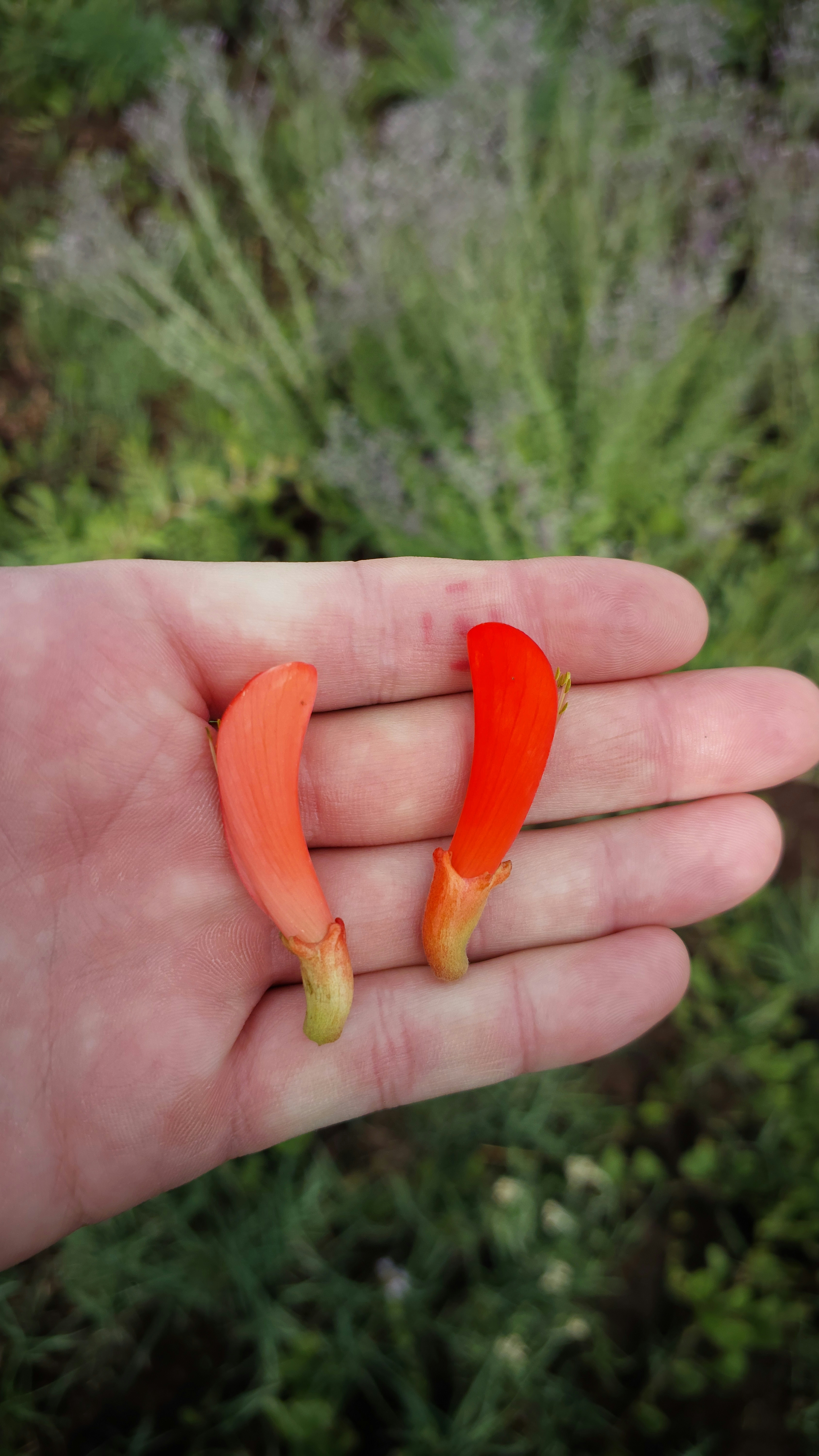
Flowers
