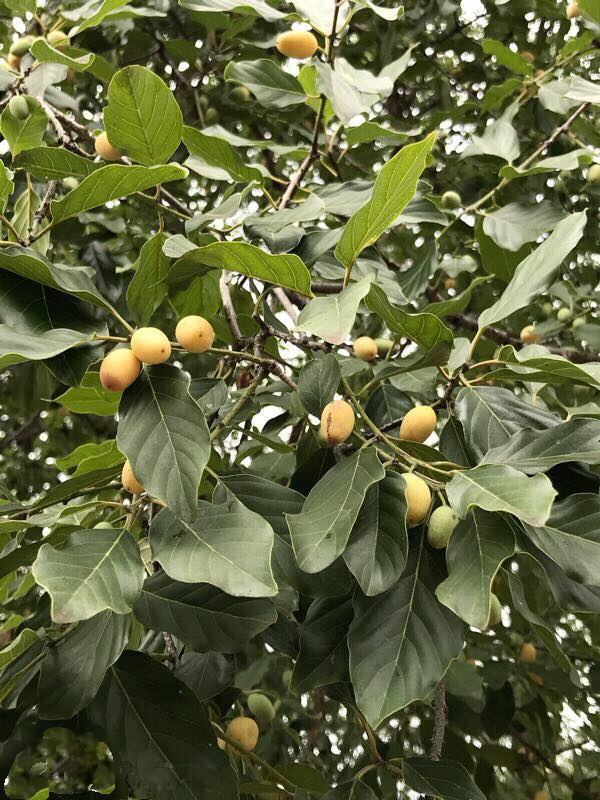

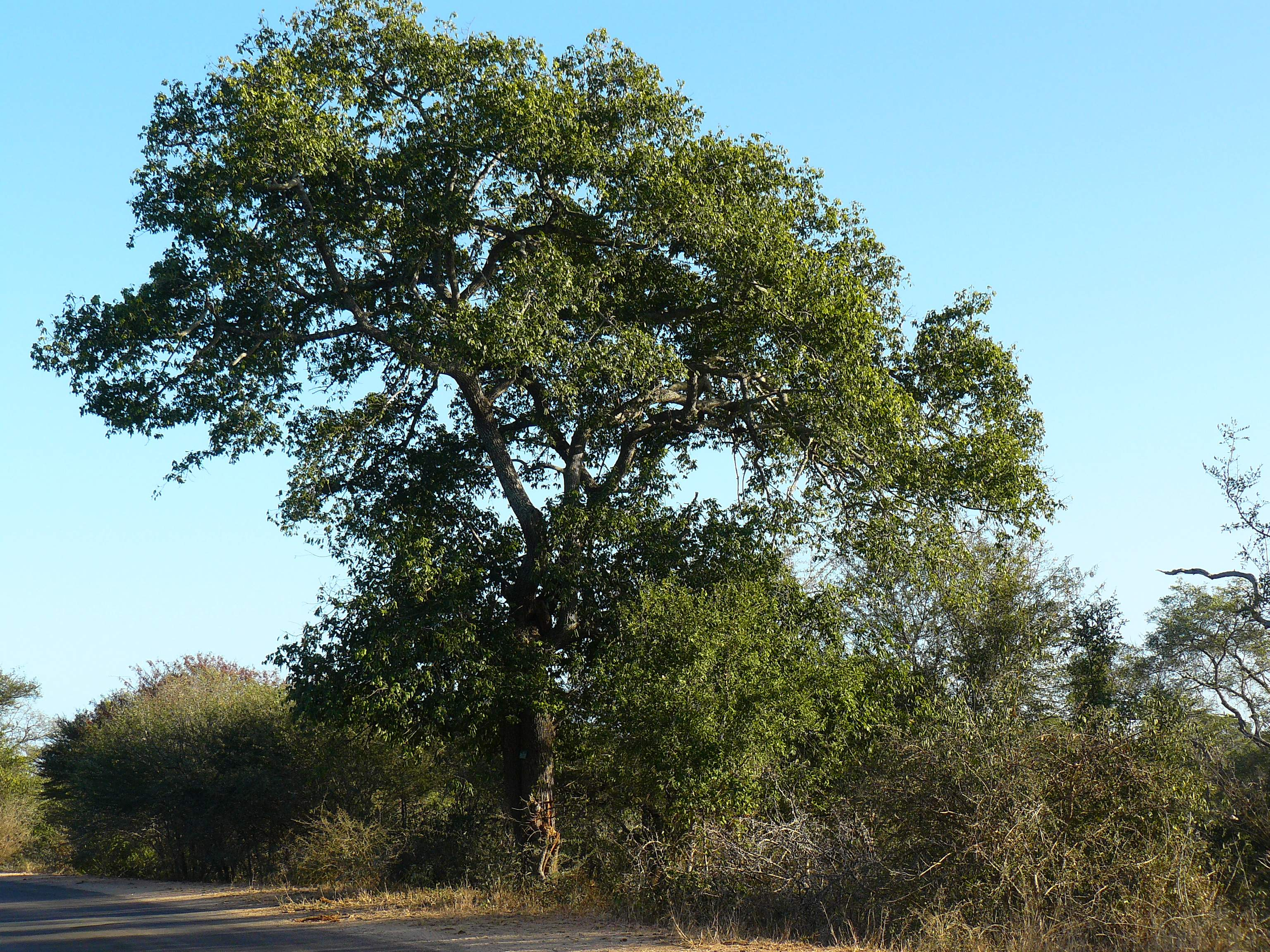
- Brown ivory in the Kruger National Park

Conservation status
- Least Concern (IUCN 3.1)

Scientific classification
- Kingdom: Plantae
- Clade: Tracheophytes
- Clade: Angiosperms
- Clade: Eudicots
- Clade: Rosids
- Order: Rosales
- Family: Rhamnaceae
- Genus: Phyllogeiton
- Species: P. discolor

Binomial name
- Phyllogeiton discolor (Klotzsch) Herzog

Synonyms
- List: Adolia discolor (Klotzsch) Kuntze; Araliorhamnus punctulata H.Perrier; Araliorhamnus vaginata H.Perrier; Berchemia discolor (Klotzsch) Hemsl.; Scutia discolor Klotzsch

= Phyllogeiton discolor =

Species of tree

Phyllogeiton discolor (syn. Berchemia discolor), known as bird plum or brown ivory in English, is a tree native to southern and eastern Africa including Madagascar. It is a broadleaf tree growing to 18 m (60 ft).

The fruits, resembling dates, are edible with sweet flesh surrounding 1-2 flat seeds. They are occasionally sold in local markets, eaten fresh, or dried and pounded and then added to pearl millet pap for their sweet flavour. Animals such as monkeys, baboons and birds also eat them.

== Ecology ==
The leaves are eaten by elephants, giraffe and several antelopes, as well as livestock, such that many trees exhibit a distinct browse line. The wood is hard and attractive, suitable for furniture, charcoal, building material, beehives, crafts, and things like tool handles and pestles.

== Uses ==
Phyllogeiton discolor is also used as a dye, fodder, ornamental tree and as herbal medicine to treat several human and animal diseases and ailments. For instance, the Himba people cook the bark against nausea and diarrhoea.

== Gallery ==
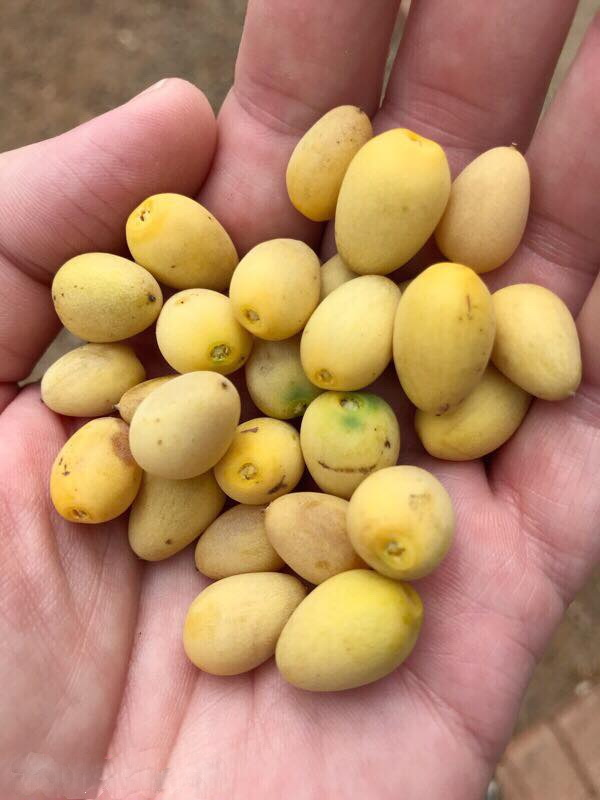
Fruit

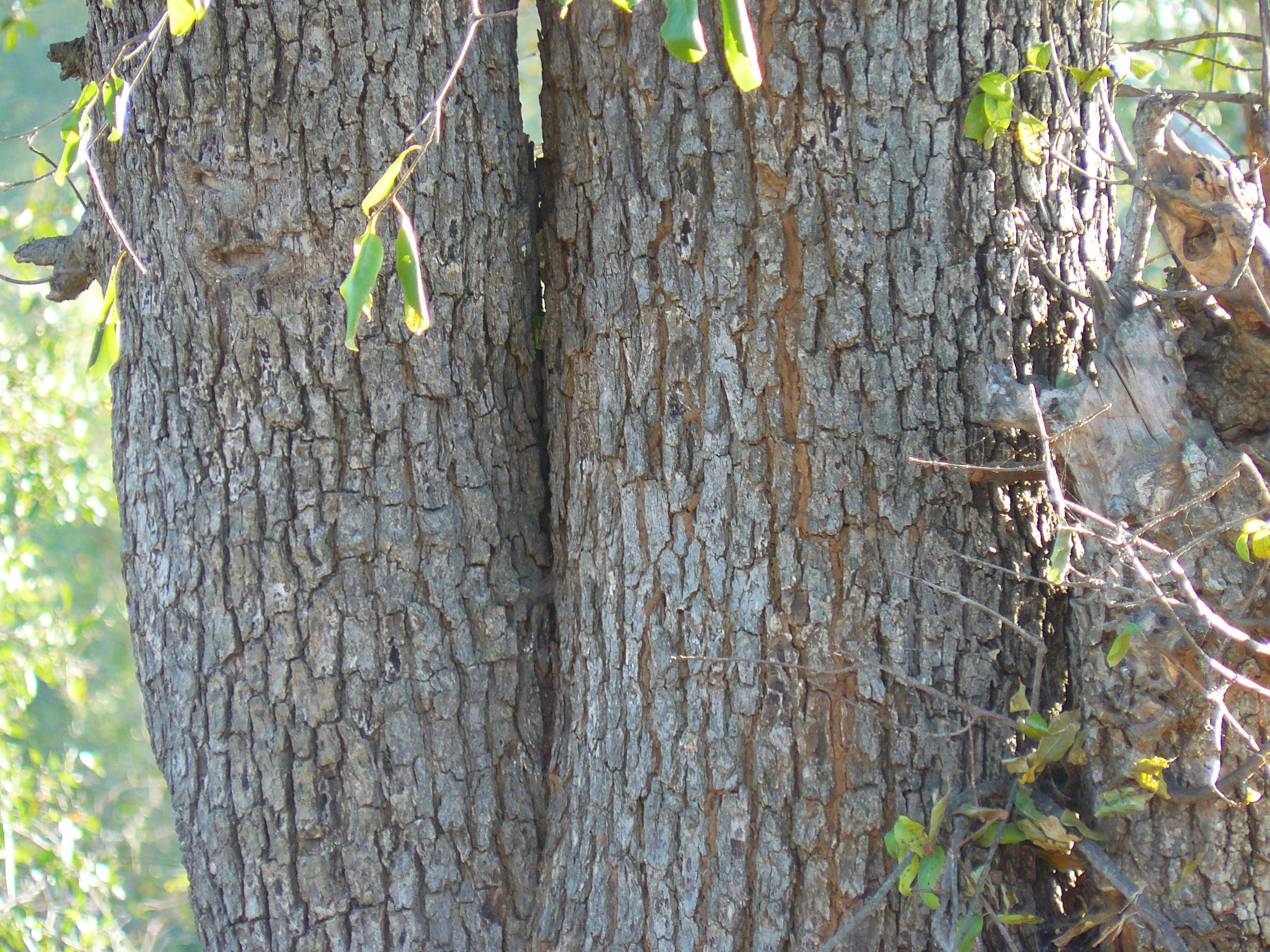
Bark

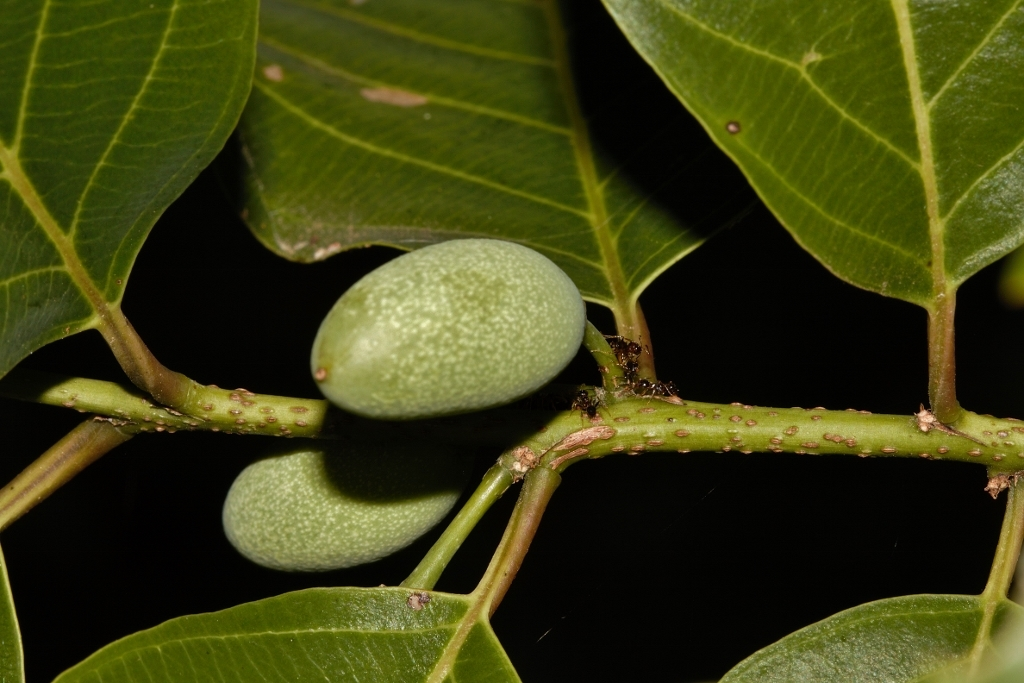
Unripe fruit and leaves
