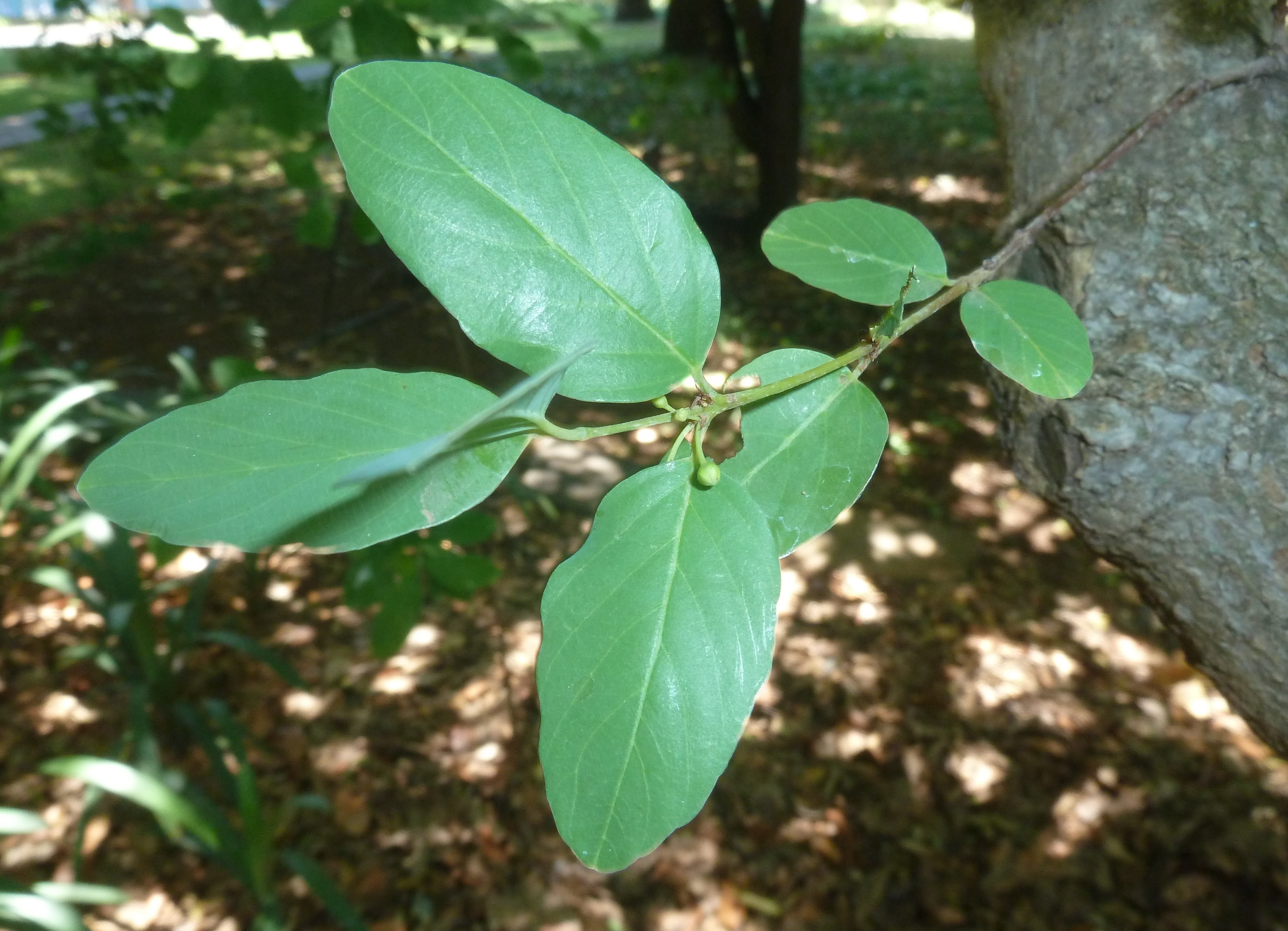

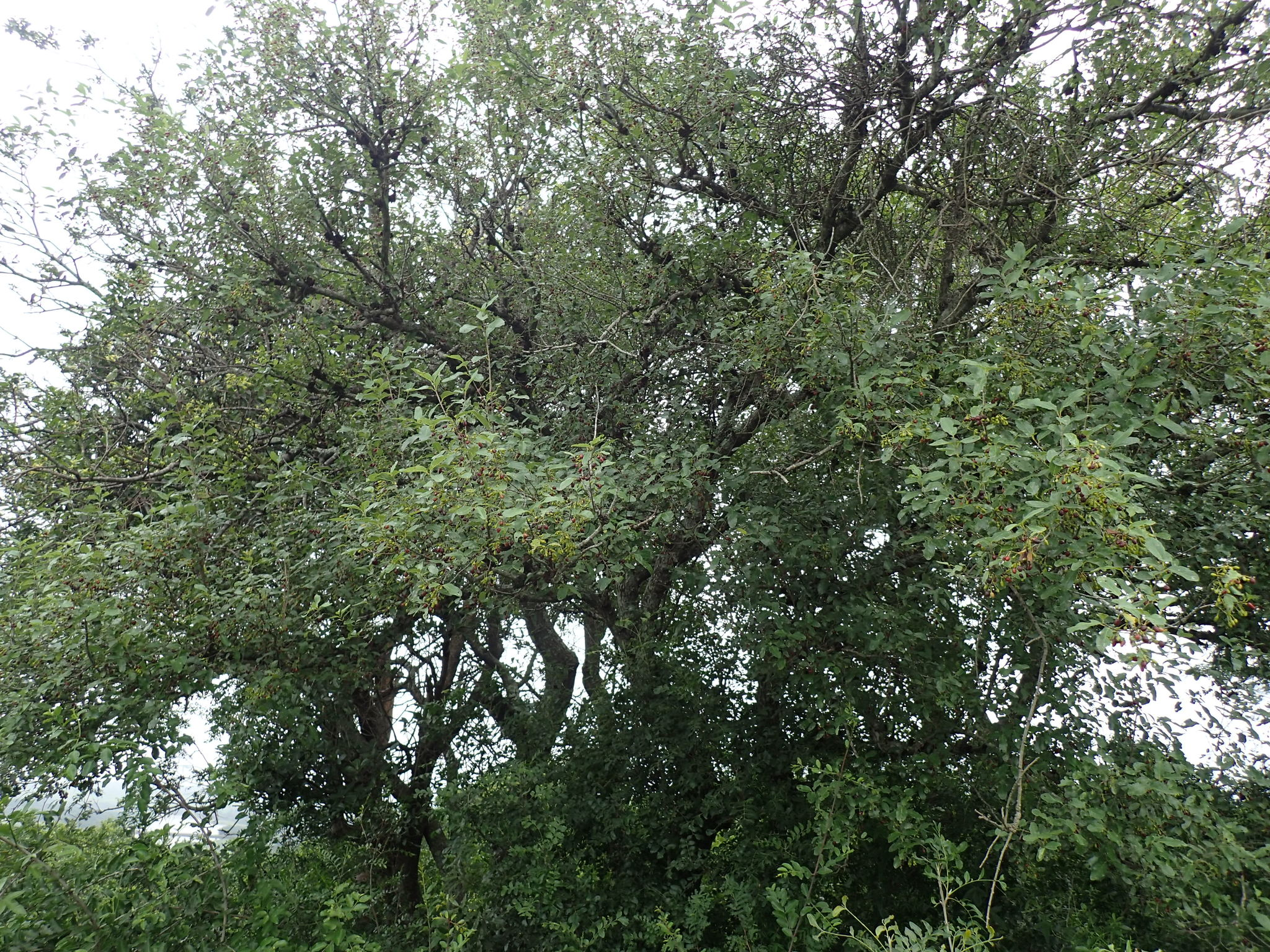

Conservation status
- Least Concern (IUCN 3.1)

Scientific classification
- Kingdom: Plantae
- Clade: Tracheophytes
- Clade: Angiosperms
- Clade: Eudicots
- Clade: Rosids
- Order: Rosales
- Family: Rhamnaceae
- Genus: Phyllogeiton
- Species: P. zeyheri

Binomial name
- Phyllogeiton zeyheri (Sond.) Suess.

Synonyms
- Berchemia zeyheri (Sond.) Grubov; Rhamnus zeyheri Sond.

= Pink ivory =

Species of tree

Pink ivory (Phyllogeiton zeyheri), also called red ivory, purple ivory, unnini or umgoloti, is an African hardwood used to make a variety of products (for example: billiard cues and knife handles). The pink ivory tree grows predominantly in Zimbabwe, Mozambique, Northern Botswana and South Africa. The tree is protected and sustainably maintained in South Africa, only felled by very limited permit. The wood is extremely hard, with a density of 990 g/dm^{3}.

== Usage ==
Pink ivory was the royal tree of the Zulu people and only members of the royal family were allowed to possess it until the Anglo-Zulu War of 1879. Before the Anglo-Zulu War, the Zulu king (and prior to 1818, Zulu chiefs) would possess a pink ivory knobkerrie (a stick with a knob at one end) and also wear jewellery made from precious pink ivory wood. According to rumour, non-royals who possessed the wood would summarily be put to death. After Zululand fell to the British and was separated into 13 separate "kinglets" in 1883, all vying to retake control of what was once theirs precedent to the onset of apartheid, the pink ivory wood became much less important a sign of control than genuine control could be.

The pink ivory tree produces a yellow, brownish, reddish, or purplish drupe fruit that is delicious to taste. Other parts of the tree have been used traditionally as remedies and medicines.

Pink ivory is often cited as one of the most expensive woods in the world, along with African blackwood, sandalwood, agarwood and ebony.

== Etymology ==
The species epithet honours Karl Zeyher (1799–1858), a German botanical and entomological collector active in the Cape Colony from 1822 until his death during the local smallpox epidemic of 1858. Other taxa bearing his name include Combretum zeyheri, Erythrina zeyheri, Mimusops zeyheri, and Stachys zeyheri.

== Gallery ==
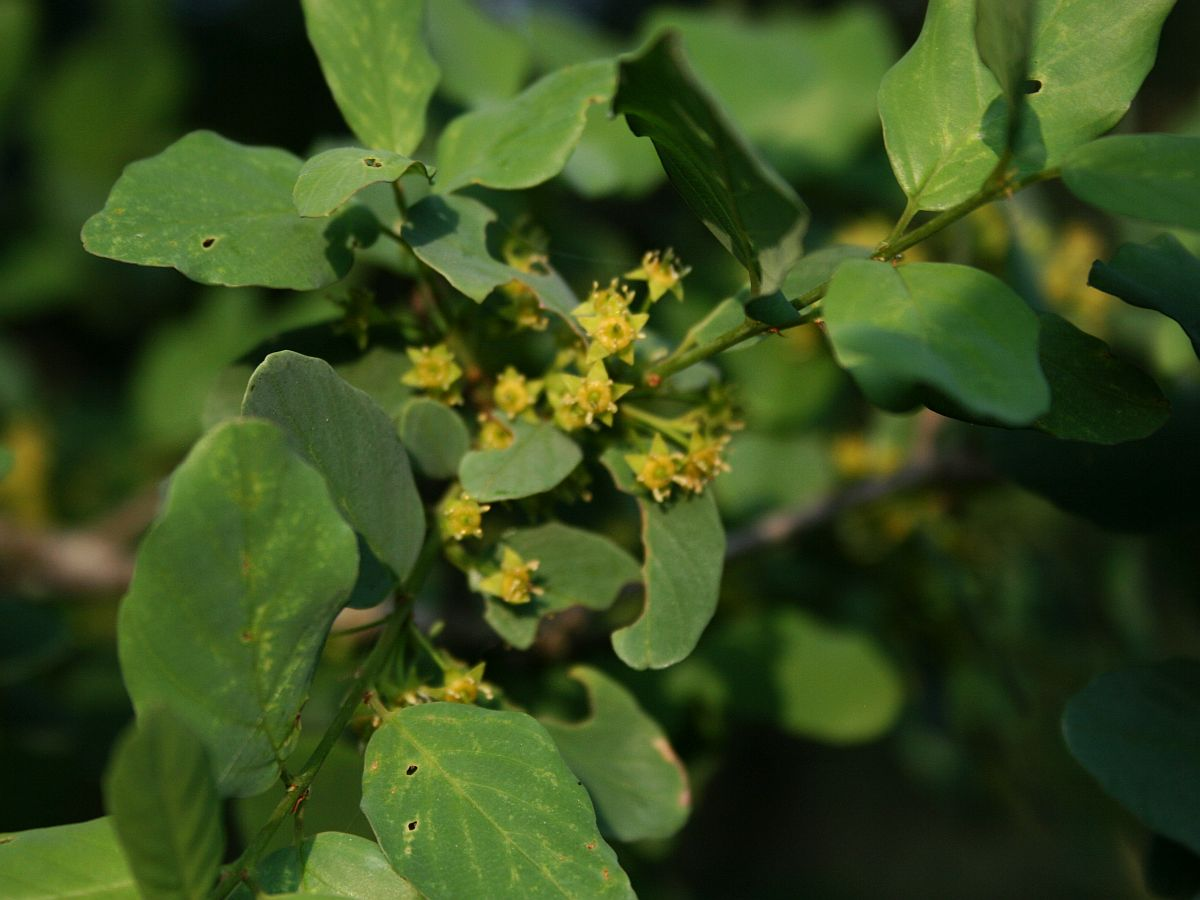
Flowers

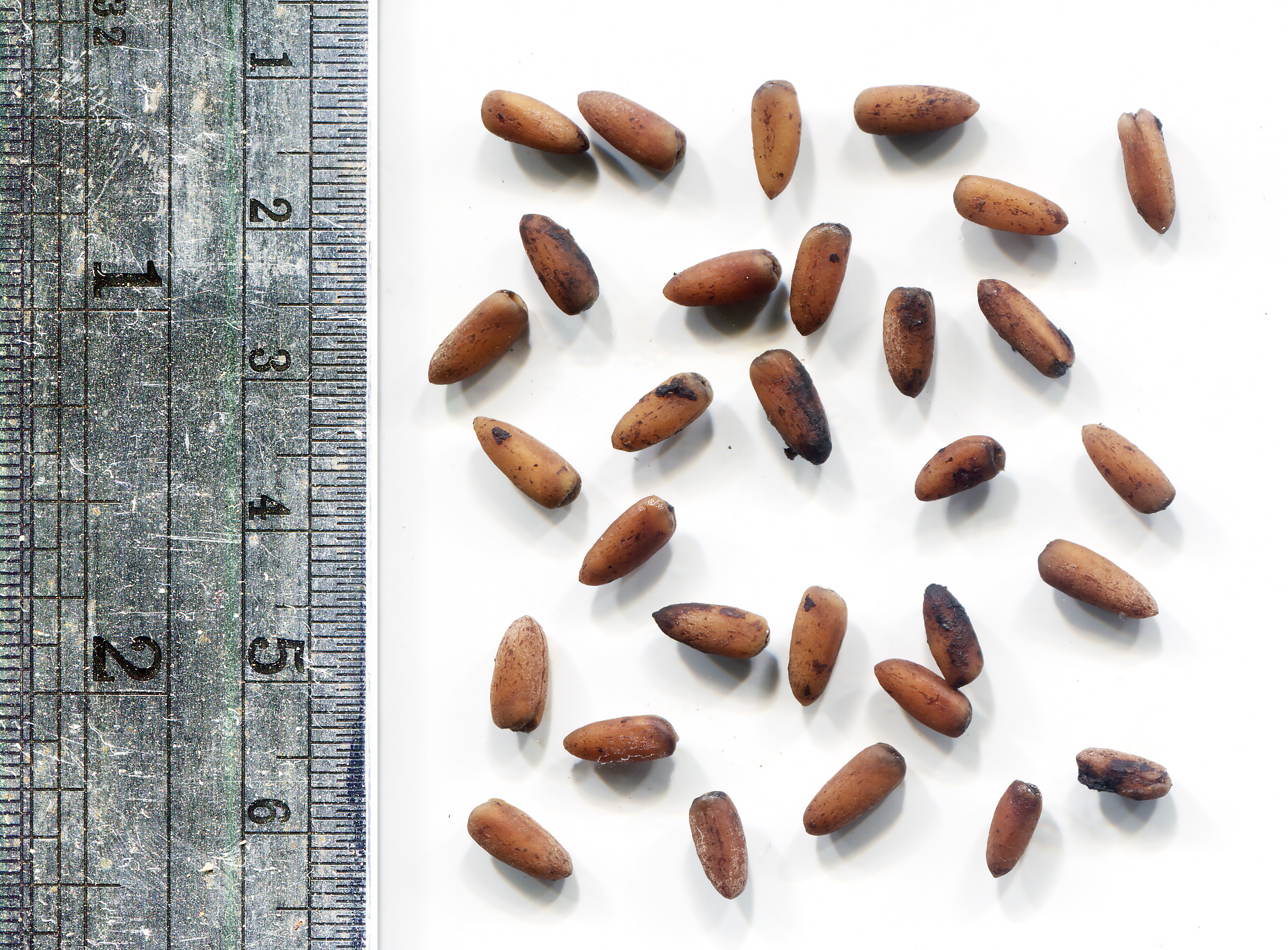
Seeds

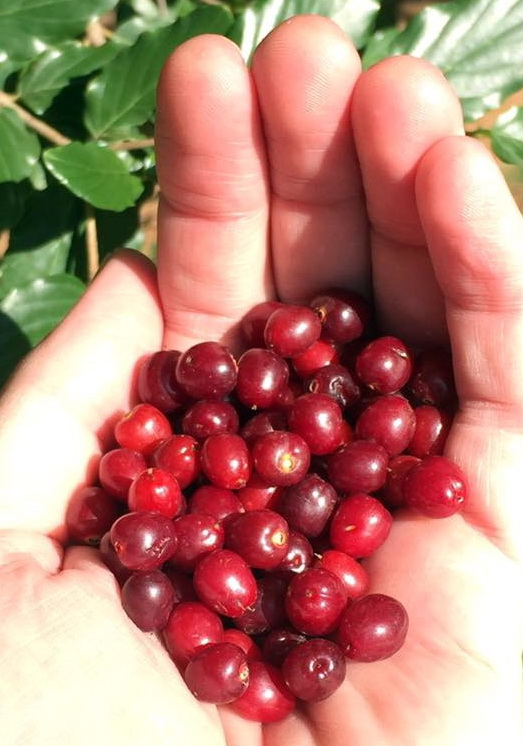
Fruit

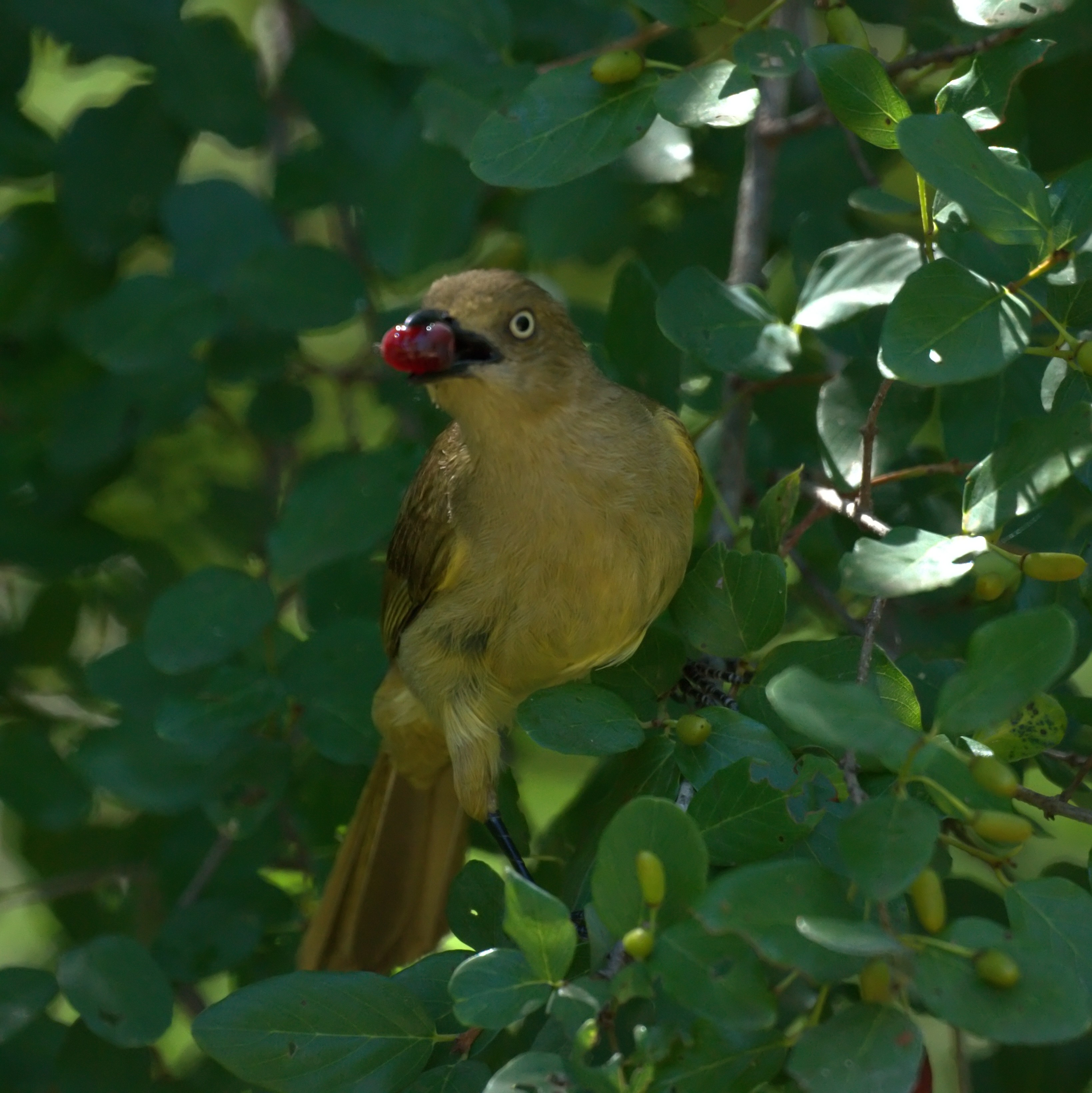
Sombre greenbul (Andropadus importunus) on the eastern shore of Lake Sibayi, feeding on the fruit of the red ivory.
