= Geoxyle =

Plant with large woody underground structure

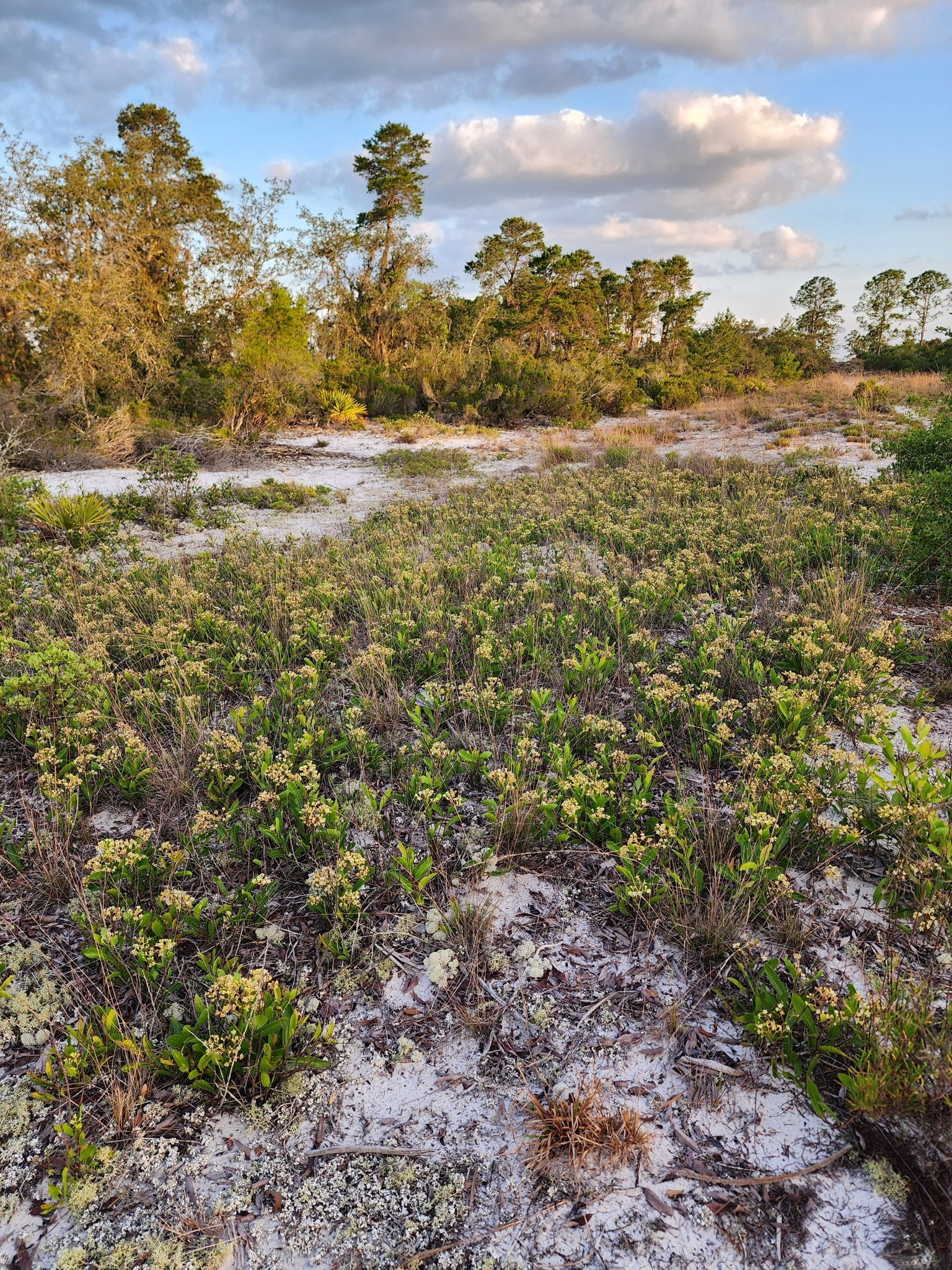
Geobalanus oblongifolius, a geoxyle whose characteristic woody root system remains buried underground, giving the plant the appearance of a collection of shrubs.

A geoxyle is a plant in which an enlarged, woody structure occurs beneath the surface of the ground. Such plants have developed independently in various plant lineages, mostly evolving in the Pliocene and subsequently diverging within the last two million years. In contrast to their close relatives, these plants have developed in areas with both high rainfall and a high frequency of fires. They are sometimes known as underground trees, and the areas where they grow as underground forests.

The geoxylic growth forms of woody subshrubs is characterised by massive lignotubers or underground woody axes from which emerge aerial shoots which may be ephemeral. These growth forms are found in savannahs in southern Africa. It is thought they developed in tandem with the spread of savannahs which resulted in an increase in tall grasses which are easily flammable during the long dry season associated with the savannah climate. Some well-known examples of geoxyles are the sand apple (Parinari capensis), the plough-breaker (Erythrina zeyheri), the red wings (Combretum platypetalum) and the wild grape (Lannea edulis). Others are Ancylobothrys petersiana, Diospyros galpinii, Elephantorrhiza elephantina, Erythrina resupinata, Eugenia albanensis, Eugenia capensis, Maytenus nemorosa, Pachystigma venosum and Salacia kraussii.

Their occurrence is influenced by environmental disturbances and climate seasonality, while soil fertility impacts functional types and their diversity.
