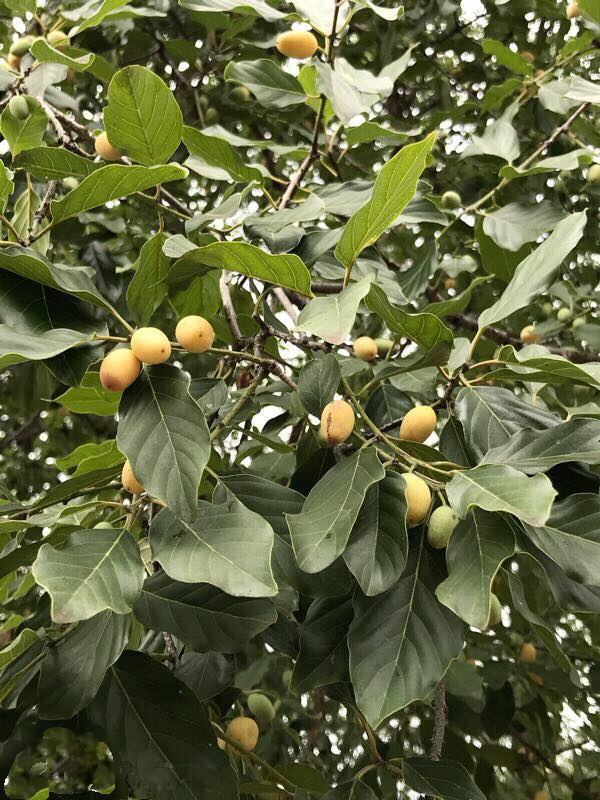
- Phyllogeiton discolor, formerly Berchemia discolor

Scientific classification
- Kingdom: Plantae
- Clade: Embryophytes
- Clade: Tracheophytes
- Clade: Angiosperms
- Clade: Eudicots
- Clade: Rosids
- Order: Rosales
- Family: Rhamnaceae
- Tribe: Rhamneae
- Genus: Phyllogeiton (Weberb.) Herzog

Species
- See text

= Phyllogeiton =

Genus of flowering plants

Phyllogeiton is a small genus of flowering plants in the family Rhamnaceae, native to eastern and southern Africa, Madagascar, and the Arabian Peninsula. It was resurrected from Berchemia.

== Species ==
The following species are accepted:

- Phyllogeiton discolor (Klotzsch) Herzog – bird plum or brown ivory
- Phyllogeiton zeyheri (Sond.) Suess. – pink ivory
