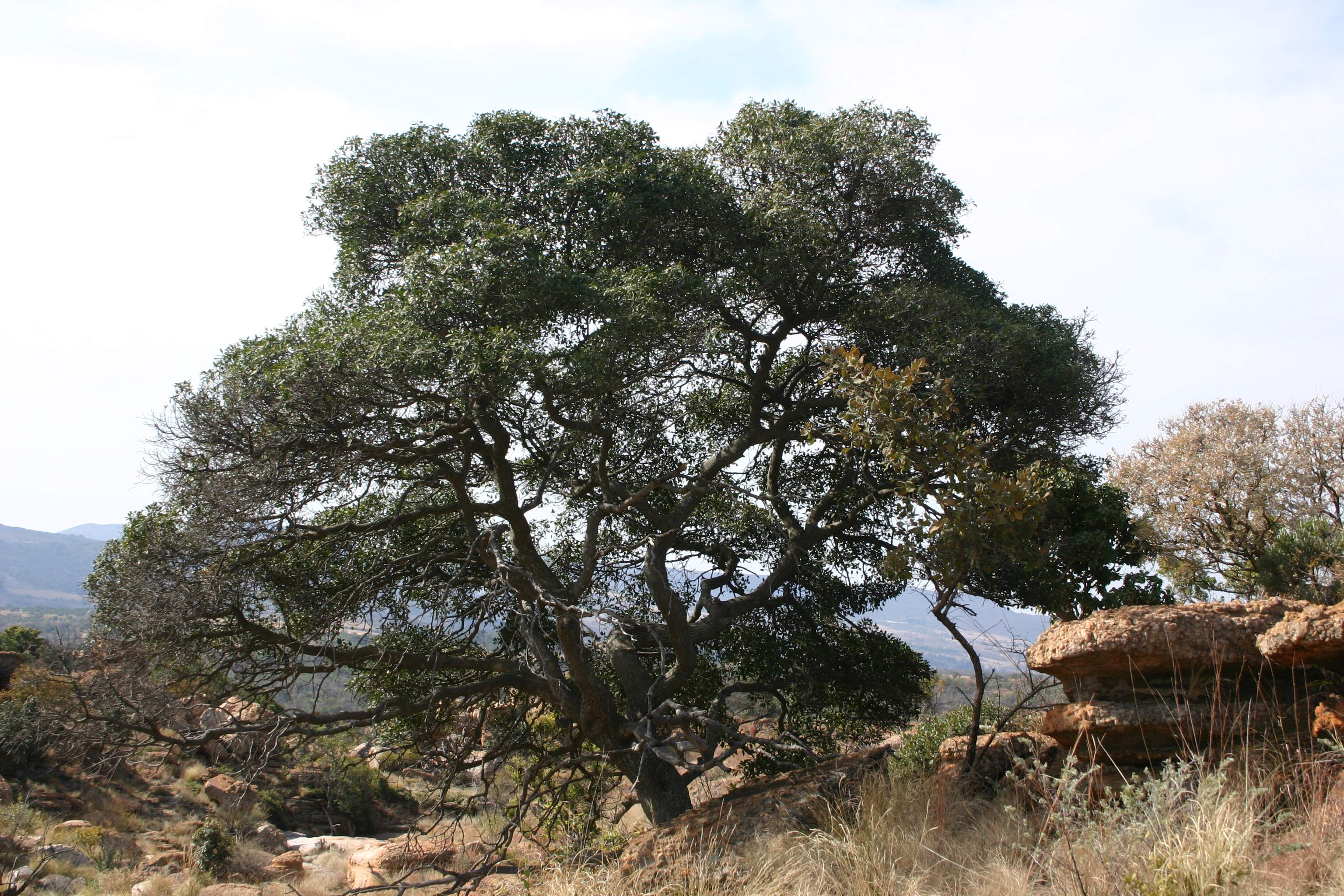

Conservation status
- Least Concern (IUCN 3.1)

Scientific classification
- Kingdom: Plantae
- Clade: Tracheophytes
- Clade: Angiosperms
- Clade: Eudicots
- Clade: Asterids
- Order: Ericales
- Family: Sapotaceae
- Genus: Mimusops
- Species: M. zeyheri

Binomial name
- Mimusops zeyheri Sond.

Synonyms
- Mimusops affinis De Wild.; Mimusops blantyreana Engl.; Mimusops decorifolia S.Moore; Mimusops monroi S.Moore

= Mimusops zeyheri =

Transvaal red milkwood

Species of tree

Mimusops zeyheri is a medium-sized (up to 15m) evergreen tree belonging to the family Sapotaceae and widely distributed in rocky places from the east coast of southern Africa, inland and northwards to tropical Africa. It is commonly known as the moepel or Transvaal red milkwood. It is closely related to Mimusops obovata and M. afra, both of which are South African trees.

== Description ==
Its leaves are leathery and entire. Petioles and young leaves are covered in short rusty red hairs. Small amounts of latex can be seen on bruised leaves or petioles. The ripe yellow fruits have a glossy, brittle skin and are sweet and edible, floury in texture and slightly astringent. The wood is reddish-brown in colour, hard and tough, and was traditionally used in the making of wagons. Clusters of fragrant white flowers appear from October to January.

== Habit ==
Given sufficient space, this species can grow into a very large, densely shady tree. Some enormous specimens are to be seen amongst the ruins of Great Zimbabwe. This species is often found in association with Englerophytum magalismontanum.

== Etymology ==
The species epithet honours Karl Zeyher (1799–1858), a German botanical and entomological collector active in the Cape Colony from 1822 until his death during the local smallpox epidemic of 1858. Other taxa bearing his name include Combretum zeyheri, Erythrina zeyheri, Phyllogeiton zeyheri, and Stachys zeyheri.

== Gallery ==
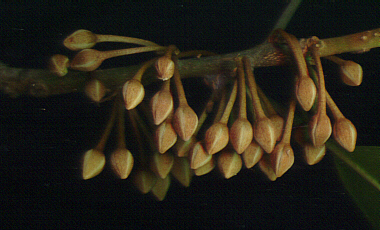
Flower buds

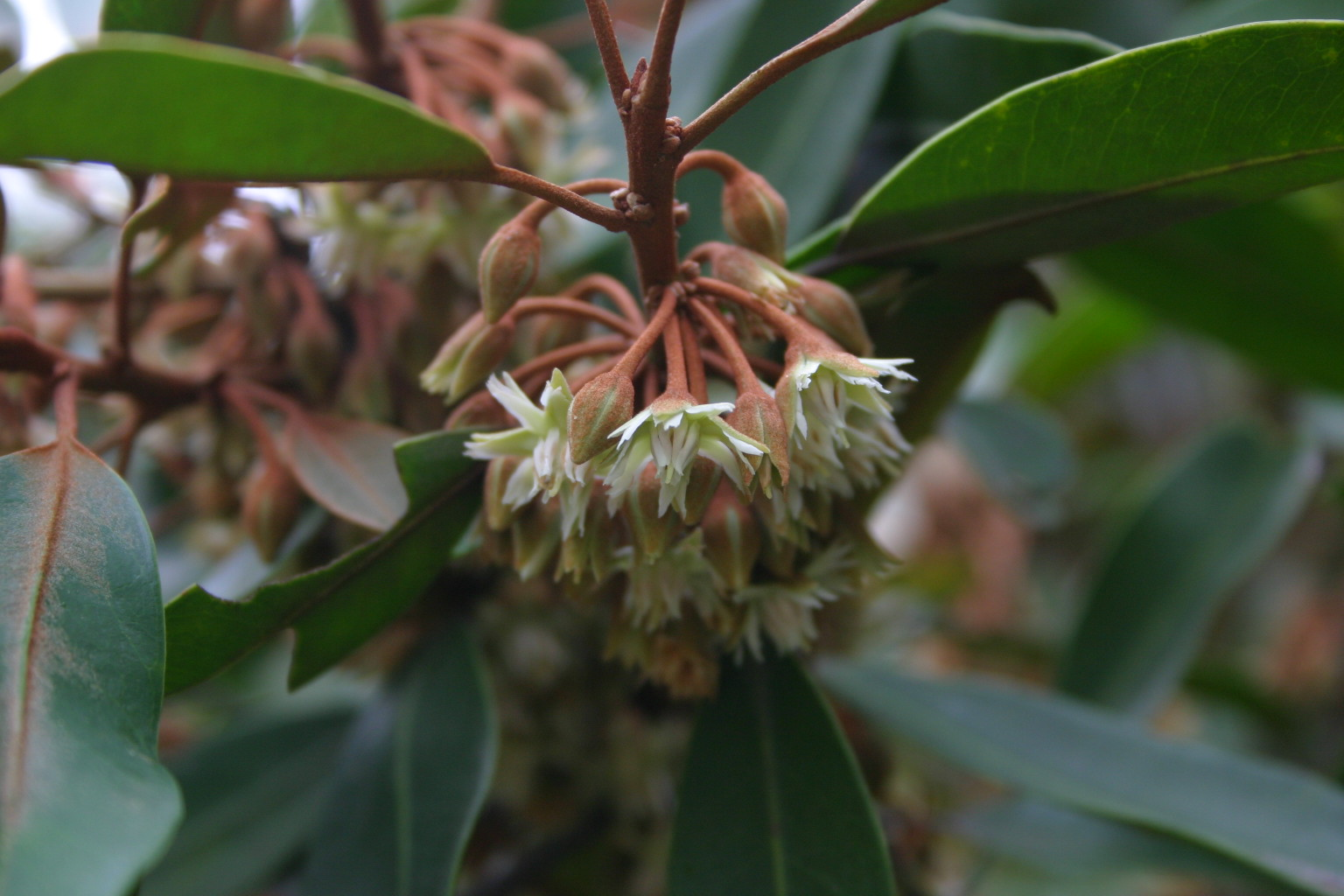
Flowers

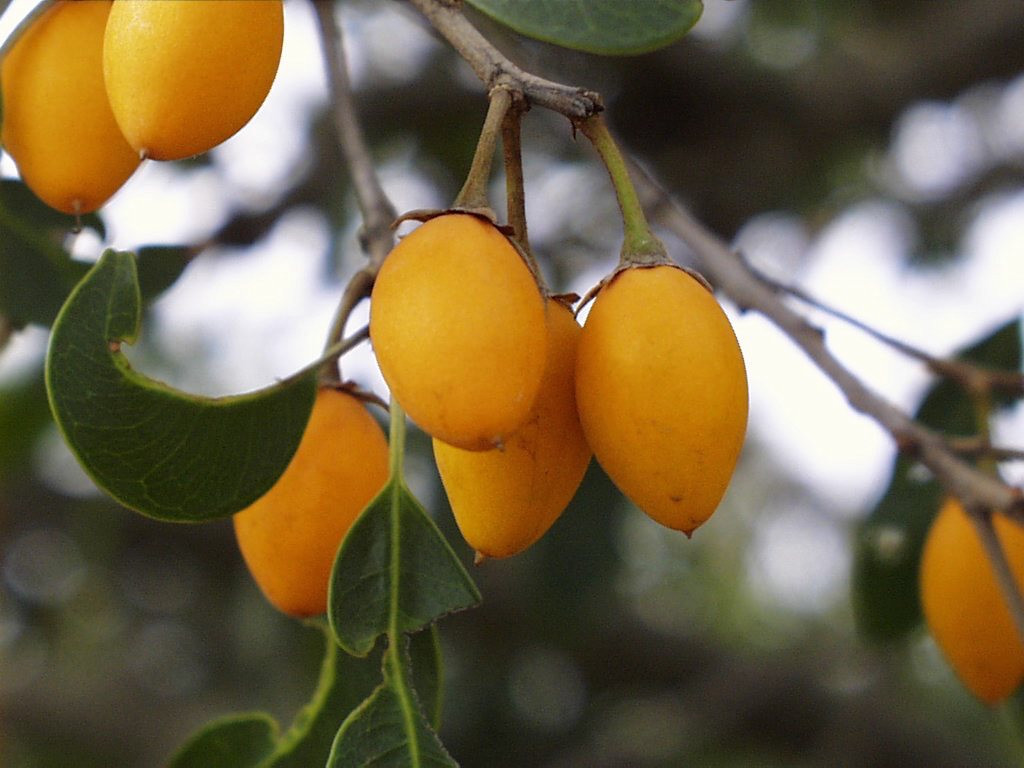
Fruit

== See also ==
- List of Southern African indigenous trees and woody lianes
