= Red-eyed bulbul =

Red-eyed bulbul may refer to:

- African red-eyed bulbul, a species of bird found in south-western Africa
- Asian red-eyed bulbul, a species of bird found in south-eastern Asia
