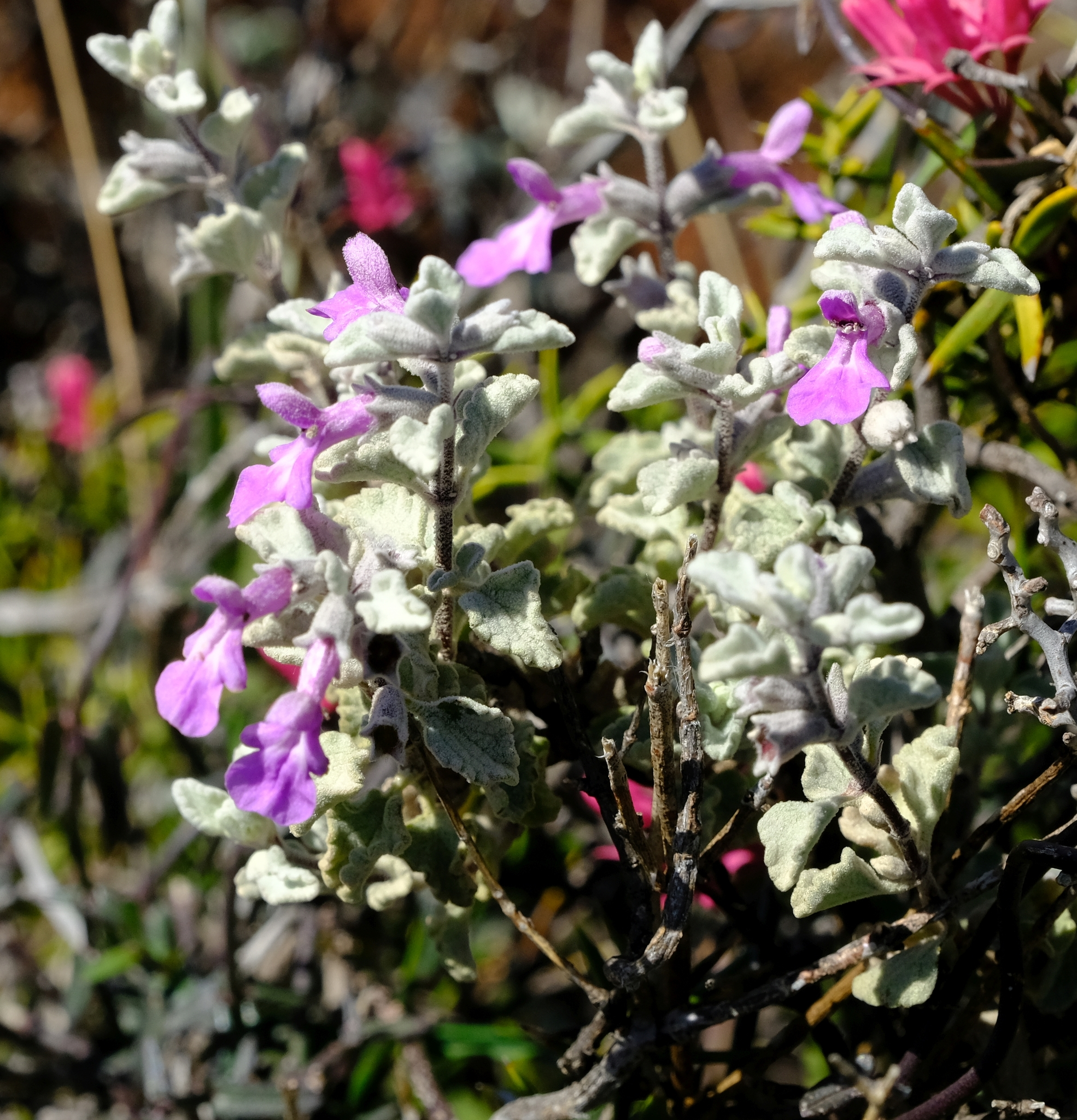

Conservation status
- Least Concern (SANBI Red List)

Scientific classification
- Kingdom: Plantae
- Clade: Embryophytes
- Clade: Tracheophytes
- Clade: Spermatophytes
- Clade: Angiosperms
- Clade: Eudicots
- Clade: Asterids
- Order: Lamiales
- Family: Lamiaceae
- Genus: Stachys
- Species: S. zeyheri

Binomial name
- Stachys zeyheri Skan

= Stachys zeyheri =

Species of flowering plant

Stachys zeyheri, the twiggy woundwort, is a species of hedgenettle endemic to South Africa.

== Description ==
This species is a small, twiggy shrub reaching up to around 1 m (3.3 ft). Young branchlets are densely covered in white, star-shaped hairs, becoming smoother and reddish brown with age.

The leaves are very small and borne on short stalks. The blades are thick, ovate to broadly ovate, 5–10 mm (0.2–0.4 in) long, and densely covered with short white hairs on both surfaces. They have a rounded tip, a blunt to slightly squared base, and finely scalloped margins.

The flowers are arranged in a few small whorls of two flowers each, set among the terminal leaves of short shoots. The calyx is densely hairy. The corolla is pink; it has a short tube and two lips, the lower lip slightly longer than the upper.

Stachys zeyheri flowers from August to January.

== Distribution and habitat ==
Stachys zeyheri grows in arid conditions on rocky slopes at elevations of 500–850 m (1,640–2,790 ft) between southern Bushmanland and the northernmost Kouebokkeveld Mountains.

== Etymology ==
The species epithet honours Karl Zeyher (1799–1858), a German botanical and entomological collector active in the Cape Colony from 1822 until his death during the local smallpox epidemic of 1858. He collected the species' type specimen north of Loeriesfontein.

== See also ==
- List of Lamiaceae of South Africa
