= List of Terminalia species =

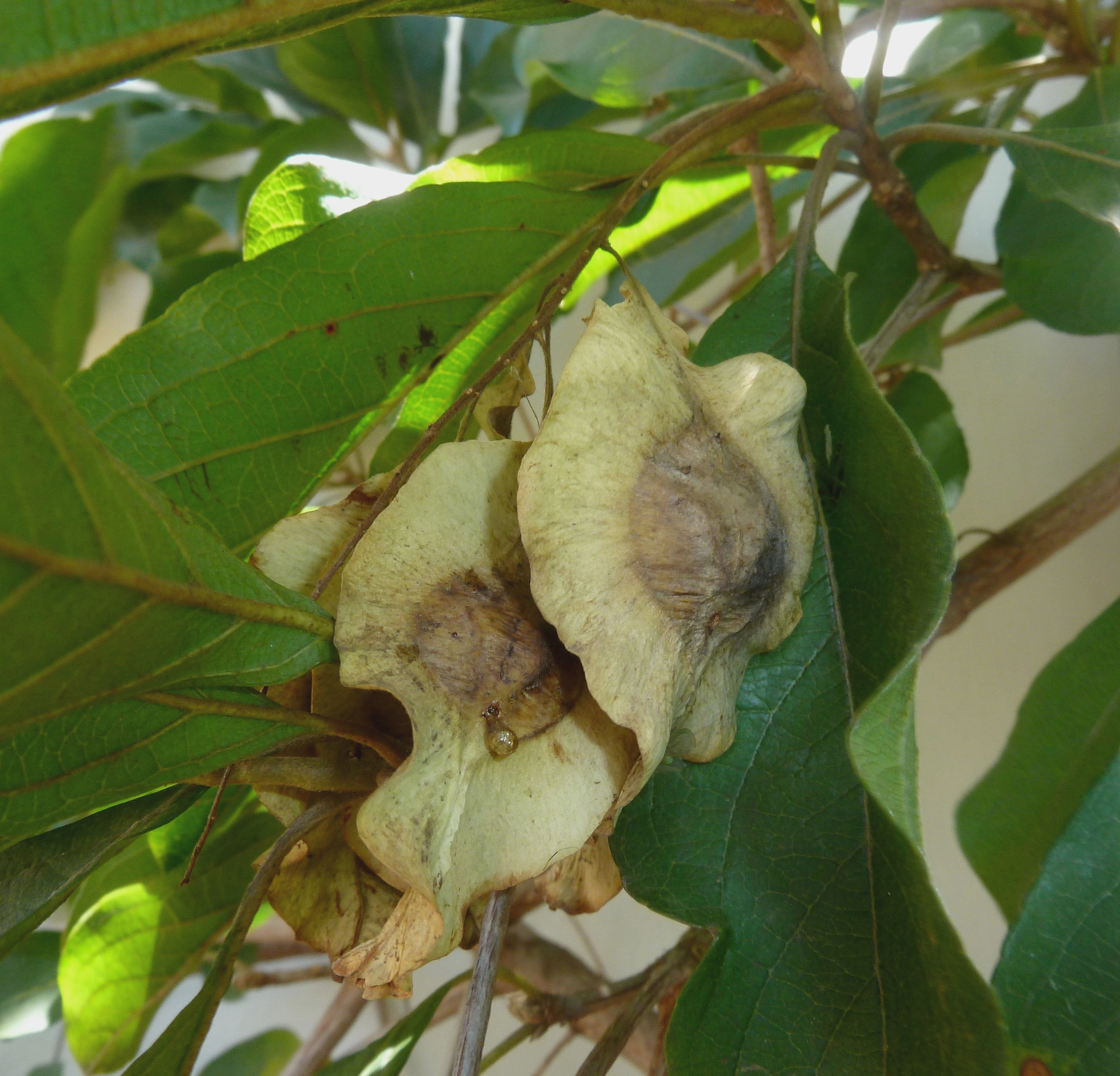
Fruits of Terminalia phanerophlebia

This is a list of Terminalia species, trees in the family Combretaceae. The list follows Plants of the World Online, which recognised 282 accepted species as of April 2021:

- Terminalia actinophylla Mart.
- Terminalia acuminata (Allemão) Eichler
- Terminalia adamantium Cambess.
- Terminalia adenopoda Miq.
- Terminalia albida Scott Elliot
- Terminalia amazonia (J.F.Gmel.) Exell
- Terminalia anisoptera (Welw. ex M.A.Lawson) Gere & Boatwr.
- Terminalia ankaranensis Capuron
- Terminalia anogeissiana Gere & Boatwr.
- Terminalia apetala (Vollesen) Gere & Boatwr.
- Terminalia arbuscula Sw.
- Terminalia archboldiana Exell
- Terminalia archipelagi Coode
- Terminalia arenicola Byrnes
- Terminalia argentea Mart.
- Terminalia aridicola Domin
- Terminalia arjuna (Roxb. ex DC.) Wight & Arn.
- Terminalia aroldoi Bisse
- Terminalia arostrata Ewart & O.B.Davies
- Terminalia aubletii Gere & Boatwr.
- Terminalia australis Cambess.
- Terminalia avicapitis Coode
- Terminalia avicennioides Guill. & Perr.
- Terminalia barbosae (Exell) Gere & Boatwr.
- Terminalia basilei Chiov.
- Terminalia beccarii Exell
- Terminalia belini Capuron
- Terminalia bellirica (Gaertn.) Roxb.
- Terminalia bentii (Baker) Gere & Boatwr.
- Terminalia bentzoe (L.) L.f.
- Terminalia bialata (Roxb.) Steud.
- Terminalia bipleura Borhidi & O.Muñiz
- Terminalia boivinii Tul.
- Terminalia brachystemma Welw. ex Hiern
- Terminalia brassii Exell
- Terminalia brevipes Pamp.
- Terminalia brownii Fresen.
- Terminalia buceras (L.) C.Wright
- Terminalia bucidoides Standl. & L.O.Williams
- Terminalia burmanica King ex Prain
- Terminalia bursarina F.Muell.
- Terminalia calamansanai (Blanco) Rolfe
- Terminalia calcicola H.Perrier
- Terminalia calogemma Coode
- Terminalia calophylla Tul.
- Terminalia cambodiana Gagnep.
- Terminalia camuxa Pickel
- Terminalia canaliculata Exell
- Terminalia canescens (DC.) Radlk.
- Terminalia capitanea A.C.Sm.
- Terminalia capitulata Exell
- Terminalia carolinensis Kaneh.
- Terminalia catappa L.
- Terminalia celebica Exell
- Terminalia cephalota McPherson
- Terminalia chebula Retz.
- Terminalia cherrieri MacKee
- Terminalia citrina (Gaertn.) Roxb.
- Terminalia clemensae Exell
- Terminalia complanata K.Schum.
- Terminalia congesta (Ducke) Gere & Boatwr.
- Terminalia coronata (Stapf) Gere & Boatwr.
- Terminalia corrugata (Ducke) Gere & Boatwr.
- Terminalia corticosa Pierre ex Laness.
- Terminalia costaricensis (Stace) Gere & Boatwr.
- Terminalia crassipes Kaneh. & Hatus.
- Terminalia creaghii Ridl.
- Terminalia crebrifolia A.C.Sm.
- Terminalia crenata Tul.
- Terminalia crispialata (Ducke) Alwan & Stace
- Terminalia cunninghamii C.A.Gardner
- Terminalia cyanocarpa Capuron
- Terminalia darfeuillana Pierre ex Laness.
- Terminalia darlingii Merr.
- Terminalia densiflora Craib
- Terminalia dhofarica (A.J.Scott) Gere & Boatwr.
- Terminalia dichotoma G.Mey.
- Terminalia diptera (Sagra) Greuter & R.Rankin
- Terminalia disjuncta H.Perrier
- Terminalia divaricata H.Perrier
- Terminalia diversipilosa H.Perrier
- Terminalia domingensis Urb.
- Terminalia duckei Gere & Boatwr.
- Terminalia eddowesii Coode
- Terminalia eichleriana Alwan & Stace
- Terminalia elliptica Willd.
- Terminalia engleri Gere & Boatwr.
- Terminalia erici-rosenii R.E.Fr.
- Terminalia eriostachya A.Rich.
- Terminalia erythrocarpa F.Muell.
- Terminalia exelliana Capuron
- Terminalia exsculpta Tul.
- Terminalia fagifolia Mart.
- Terminalia fanshawei (Exell & Maguire) Gere & Boatwr.
- Terminalia fatraea (Poir.) DC.
- Terminalia ferdinandiana Exell
- Terminalia fitzgeraldii C.A.Gardner
- Terminalia flavicans Tul.
- Terminalia foetidissima Griff.
- Terminalia franchetii Gagnep.
- Terminalia gatopensis Guillaumin
- Terminalia gazensis Baker f.
- Terminalia glabrata G.Forst.
- Terminalia glabrescens Mart.
- Terminalia glaucifolia Craib
- Terminalia gossweileri Exell & J.G.García
- Terminalia gracilipes Capuron
- Terminalia gracilis Tul.
- Terminalia grandiflora Benth.
- Terminalia grandis (Ducke) Gere & Boatwr.
- Terminalia griffithsiana Liben
- Terminalia guaiquinimae Maguire & Exell
- Terminalia guyanensis Eichler
- Terminalia habeensis (Aubrév. ex Keay) Gere & Boatwr.
- Terminalia hadleyana W.Fitzg.
- Terminalia harmandii Gagnep.
- Terminalia hoehneana (N.F.Mattos) Gere & Boatwr.
- Terminalia hylobates Eichler
- Terminalia hylodendron (Mildbr.) Gere & Boatwr.
- Terminalia hypargyrea K.Schum. & Lauterb.
- Terminalia impediens Coode
- Terminalia ivorensis A.Chev.
- Terminalia januarensis DC.
- Terminalia kaernbachii Warb.
- Terminalia kaiseriana F.Hoffm.
- Terminalia kajewskii Exell
- Terminalia kanchii Dhabe
- Terminalia kangeanensis Slooten
- Terminalia katikii Coode
- Terminalia kilimandscharica Engl.
- Terminalia kjellbergii Exell
- Terminalia kleinii (Exell) Gere & Boatwr.
- Terminalia kuhlmannii Alwan & Stace
- Terminalia kumpaja R.L.Barrett
- Terminalia laeteviridis Gilg & Ledermann ex Engl.
- Terminalia latifolia Sw.
- Terminalia latipes Benth.
- Terminalia laxiflora Engl.
- Terminalia leandriana H.Perrier
- Terminalia leiocarpa (DC.) Baill.
- Terminalia litoralis Seem.
- Terminalia longespicata Slooten
- Terminalia lucida Hoffmanns. ex Mart.
- Terminalia lundquistii Exell
- Terminalia luteola A.C.Sm.
- Terminalia macadamii Exell
- Terminalia macrantha Rojo
- Terminalia macrophylla (Spruce ex Eichler) Gere & Boatwr.
- Terminalia macroptera Guill. & Perr.
- Terminalia macrostachya (Standl.) Alwan & Stace
- Terminalia maestrensis Bisse
- Terminalia mameluco Pickel
- Terminalia mantaliopsis Capuron
- Terminalia mantaly H.Perrier
- Terminalia maoi Dhabe
- Terminalia megalocarpa Exell
- Terminalia megalophylla (Van Heurck & Müll.Arg.) Gere & Boatwr.
- Terminalia melanocarpa F.Muell.
- Terminalia menezesii Mendes & Exell
- Terminalia microcarpa Decne.
- Terminalia modesta Tul.
- Terminalia molii Exell
- Terminalia molinetii M.Gómez
- Terminalia mollis M.A.Lawson
- Terminalia morobensis Coode
- Terminalia muelleri Benth.
- Terminalia myanmarensis W.J.Kress & DeFilipps
- Terminalia myriocarpa Van Heurck & Müll.Arg.
- Terminalia myrtifolia (M.A.Lawson) Gere & Boatwr.
- Terminalia narnorokensis H.Perrier
- Terminalia neglecta Bisse
- Terminalia neotaliala Capuron
- Terminalia nigrovenulosa Pierre
- Terminalia nipensis Alain
- Terminalia nitens C.Presl
- Terminalia nitidissima Rich.
- Terminalia novocaledonica Däniker
- Terminalia obidensis Ducke
- Terminalia oblonga (Ruiz & Pav.) Steud.
- Terminalia oblongata F.Muell.
- Terminalia ochroprumna (Eichler) Gere & Boatwr.
- Terminalia oliveri Brandis
- Terminalia ombrophila H.Perrier
- Terminalia orbicularis Engl. & Diels
- Terminalia oreadum Diels
- Terminalia orientensis Monach.
- Terminalia oryzetorum Craib
- Terminalia oxycarpa Mart.
- Terminalia oxyphylla Miq.
- Terminalia pachystyla Borhidi
- Terminalia pallida Brandis
- Terminalia pallidovirens (Cuatrec.) Gere & Boatwr.
- Terminalia paniculata Roth
- Terminalia papuana Exell
- Terminalia parvifolia (Ducke) Gere & Boatwr.
- Terminalia parvula Pamp.
- Terminalia pedicellata Nanakorn
- Terminalia pellucida C.Presl
- Terminalia pendula (Edgew.) Gere & Boatwr.
- Terminalia pennyana Anozie
- Terminalia perrieri Capuron
- Terminalia petiolaris A.Cunn. ex Benth.
- Terminalia phaeocarpa Eichler
- Terminalia phanerophlebia Engl. & Diels
- Terminalia phellocarpa King
- Terminalia phillyreifolia (Van Heurck & Müll.Arg.) Gere & Boatwr.
- Terminalia plagata Merr.
- Terminalia platyphylla F.Muell.
- Terminalia platyptera F.Muell.
- Terminalia polyantha C.Presl
- Terminalia polycarpa Engl. & Diels
- Terminalia porphyrocarpa F.Muell. ex Benth.
- Terminalia procera Roxb.
- Terminalia prostrata Pedley
- Terminalia prunioides M.A.Lawson
- Terminalia psilantha A.C.Sm.
- Terminalia pteleopsoides Exell
- Terminalia pterocarpa Melville & P.S.Green
- Terminalia pterocarya F.Muell.
- Terminalia pulcherrima (Exell & Stace) Gere & Boatwr.
- Terminalia quintalata Maguire
- Terminalia ramatuella Alwan & Stace
- Terminalia randii Baker f.
- Terminalia reitzii Exell
- Terminalia rerei Coode
- Terminalia rhopalophora Capuron
- Terminalia richii A.Gray
- Terminalia riedelii Eichler
- Terminalia rivularis (Gagnep.) Gere & Boatwr.
- Terminalia rostrata Fosberg & Falanruw
- Terminalia rubiginosa K.Schum.
- Terminalia rubricarpa Baker f.
- Terminalia rufovestita Capuron
- Terminalia sambesiaca Engl. & Diels
- Terminalia samoensis Rech.
- Terminalia schimperiana Hochst
- Terminalia scutifera Planch. ex M.A.Lawson
- Terminalia sepicana Diels
- Terminalia septentrionalis Capuron
- Terminalia sericea Burch. ex DC.
- Terminalia seyrigii (H.Perrier) Capuron
- Terminalia shankarraoi Dhabe
- Terminalia × silozensis Gibbs
- Terminalia simulans A.C.Sm.
- Terminalia slooteniana Exell
- Terminalia soembawana Slooten
- Terminalia solomonensis Exell
- Terminalia spinosa Engl.
- Terminalia steenisiana Exell
- Terminalia stenostachya Engl. & Diels
- Terminalia strigillosa A.C.Sm.
- Terminalia stuhlmannii Engl.
- Terminalia suaveolens (Eichler) Gere & Boatwr.
- Terminalia subacroptera Domin
- Terminalia subserrata H.Perrier
- Terminalia subspathulata King
- Terminalia sulcata Tul.
- Terminalia superba Engl. & Diels
- Terminalia supitiana Koord.
- Terminalia supranitifolia Byrnes
- Terminalia surigaensis Merr.
- Terminalia tetrandra (Danguy) Capuron
- Terminalia tetraphylla (Aubl.) Gere & Boatwr.
- Terminalia tetraptera (Wickens) Gere & Boatwr.
- Terminalia travancorensis Wight & Arn.
- Terminalia trichopoda Diels
- Terminalia tricristata Capuron
- Terminalia triflora (Griseb.) Lillo
- Terminalia tristis Gilg & Ledermann ex Engl.
- Terminalia tropophylla H.Perrier
- Terminalia uleana Engl. ex Alwan & Stace
- Terminalia ulexoides H.Perrier
- Terminalia urschii H.Perrier
- Terminalia valverdeae A.H.Gentry
- Terminalia vermae M.Gangop. & Chakrab.
- Terminalia virens (Spruce ex Eichler) Alwan & Stace
- Terminalia viridiflora (Ducke) Gere & Boatwr.
- Terminalia vitiensis A.C.Sm.
- Terminalia welwitschii
- Terminalia whitmorei Coode
- Terminalia yapacana Maguire
- Terminalia zeylanica Van Heurck & Müll.Arg.
- Terminalia zollingeri Exell
