= Trabala charon =

Scientific classification
- Domain: Eukaryota
- Kingdom: Animalia
- Phylum: Arthropoda
- Class: Insecta
- Order: Lepidoptera
- Family: Lasiocampidae
- Genus: Trabala
- Species: T. charon

Binomial name
- Trabala charon H. Druce, 1910

Species of moth

Trabala charon is a moth of the family Lasiocampidae, first described by Herbert Druce in 1910. It is found in the Democratic Republic of the Congo, Cameroon, Kenya, Kenya, Malawi, Tanzania, Uganda, Zimbabwe and Zambia.

== Biology ==
Known food plants of this species are Terminalia glaucescens, Terminalia mantaly and Combretum racemosum (Combretaceae).
