= Wild plum =

Wild plum is a common name for several trees with edible fruits, and may refer to:

- Wild growing forms of plums, especially
  - Prunus americana, native to eastern North America
- Amelanchier, a genus in the Rosaceae producing small fruits lacking a pit
- Harpephyllum afrum, an Afrotropical tree species
- Podocarpus drouynianus, a conifer native to Australia
- Terminalia platyphylla, a tree native to Australia
