= River coastline of Argentina =

The river coastline of Argentina refers to the section of the country's coastline overlooking the waters of the Río de la Plata, within a vast river basin located in the central-eastern part of the South American subcontinent, which flows into the Argentine Sea in the south-western Atlantic Ocean. As it is exclusive to the northeast of the province of Buenos Aires, it is also often referred to as the Buenos Aires coast of the Río de la Plata or the Buenos Aires river coast.

The most distinctive features of this coastline are its silty substrate, completely devoid of crystalline rocks; its extensive surrounding plain; its monotony and lack of notable coastal features, with just a few gentle points and river mouths. The most important geographical feature of the Argentine river coast is Samborombón Bay.

== Biota ==
=== Fauna ===
The riverside fauna is an ecotourism attraction on these coasts. A series of biological reserves have been created to ensure their protection. Among the elements that make up their biodiversity, birdlife is particularly noteworthy; around 300 species inhabit these coasts. The banks of the Upper Río de la Plata, which are always moist and have completely fresh water, have allowed the formation of a gallery forest, which, although it has various species of exotic plants, also has native vegetation, including seibos, criollo willows, and curupíes, with abundant subtropical birdlife. This coastline is also frequented by species common to the Argentine coast, such as the neotropic cormorant, ducks, herons such as the black-crowned night heron, kelp gulls, the endangered crab-eating gull, etc.

Samborombón Bay is a stopover point for rest and feeding during the enormous migrations undertaken each year by Nearctic shorebirds, such as birds of the Scolopacidae and Charadriidae families. Notable species include the red knot, the Hudsonian godwit, the white-rumped sandpiper, the sanderling, the white-rumped whimbrel, the ruddy turnstone, etc. It is also noteworthy that 10% of the world's population of buff-breasted sandpiper winter there. It also has good populations of rheas.

Due to profound anthropogenic disturbance, mammals in the northern coastal sector are scarce, with small species such as bats and rodents, especially coypus, predominating. In Samborombón Bay, mammal diversity increases as the human population and agricultural disturbance decrease due to the low productive qualities of the area. This allows the last populations of the southern pampas deer, one of the most endangered deer species in the world, to survive there. They are accompanied by capybaras, South American wildcats, Pampas vizcachas, Pampas foxes, etc.

=== Flora ===
Thanks to the hydrodynamics of the river, the northern portion of these coasts combines vegetation characteristic of the lower Paraná Delta, such as ceibo trees, native willows and river alders, as well as swamps and reed beds. The most biodiverse forest is the threatened monte blanco, a marginal forest that grows on floodplains, a mixed forest of the Paraná phytogeographic province; its species descend through the forest galleries that border the Uruguay River and, to a much lesser extent, the Paraná River. It once covered the lower Paraná River delta island revees, some restricted areas of the Buenos Aires coast of the upper Río de la Plata, and the mouths of the waterways in the same area, but nowadays it is reduced to a few hectares of great ecological value. The tree layer consists of: black laurel, chal-chal, mataojo, blanquillo, yerba del bugre, tarumá, palo amarillo, canelones (Myrsine sp.), anacahuita, ingá, pacara earpod tree, etc.
