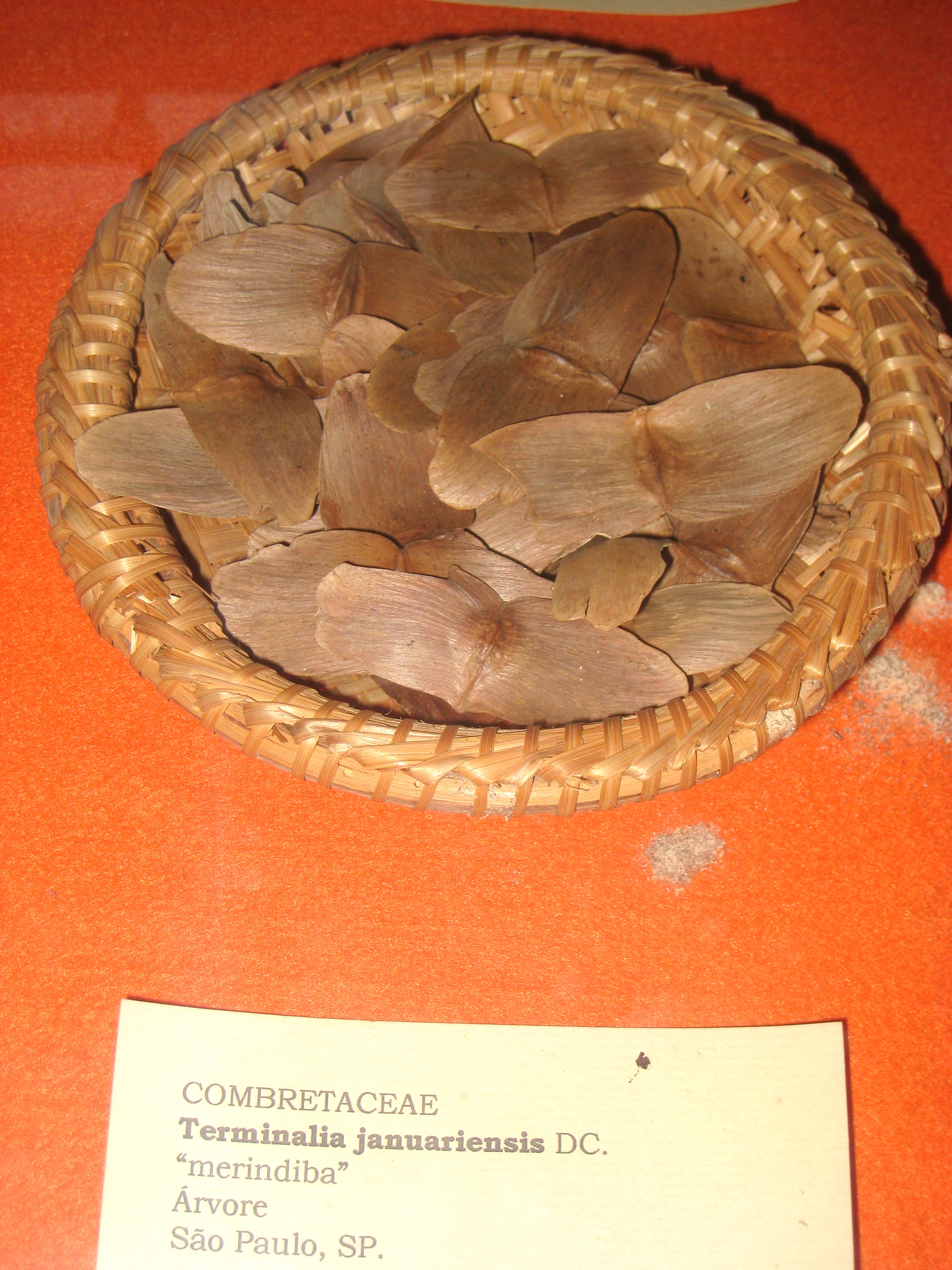
- Terminalia januariensis seeds

Conservation status
- Vulnerable (IUCN 2.3)

Scientific classification
- Kingdom: Plantae
- Clade: Tracheophytes
- Clade: Angiosperms
- Clade: Eudicots
- Clade: Rosids
- Order: Myrtales
- Family: Combretaceae
- Genus: Terminalia
- Species: T. januariensis

Binomial name
- Terminalia januariensis DC.

= Terminalia januariensis =

Species of flowering plant

Terminalia januariensis is a species of plant in the Combretaceae family. It is endemic to the Atlantic Forest ecoregion, in Minas Gerais and Rio de Janeiro states of southeastern Brazil. It is threatened by habitat loss.
