= Terminalia tetraptera =

Conservation status
- Vulnerable (IUCN 3.1)

Scientific classification
- Kingdom: Plantae
- Clade: Tracheophytes
- Clade: Angiosperms
- Clade: Eudicots
- Clade: Rosids
- Order: Myrtales
- Family: Combretaceae
- Genus: Terminalia
- Species: T. tetraptera

Binomial name
- Terminalia tetraptera (Wickens) Gere & Boatwr.

Synonyms
- Pteleopsis tetraptera Wickens

Species of flowering plant

Terminalia tetraptera is a species of flowering plant in the Combretaceae family. It is a tree native to southeastern Kenya and northeastern Tanzania, where it grows in coastal forest and scrub. It is threatened by habitat loss.
