= Aiteta truncata =

Scientific classification
- Kingdom: Animalia
- Phylum: Arthropoda
- Class: Insecta
- Order: Lepidoptera
- Superfamily: Noctuoidea
- Family: Nolidae
- Genus: Aiteta
- Species: A. truncata

Binomial name
- Aiteta truncata (Walker, 1858)

Synonyms
- Brada truncata Walker, 1858

Species of moth

Aiteta truncata is a moth of the family Nolidae first described by Francis Walker in 1858. It is found in India and Sri Lanka.

Its larval food plants are members of the genus Terminalia.
