= Terminalia barbosae =

Conservation status
- Vulnerable (IUCN 3.1)

Scientific classification
- Kingdom: Plantae
- Clade: Tracheophytes
- Clade: Angiosperms
- Clade: Eudicots
- Clade: Rosids
- Order: Myrtales
- Family: Combretaceae
- Genus: Terminalia
- Species: T. barbosae

Binomial name
- Terminalia barbosae (Exell) Gere & Boatwr.

Synonyms
- Pteleopsis barbosae Exell

Species of flowering plant

Terminalia barbosae is a species of flowering plant in the Combretaceae family. It is a tree endemic to Mozambique.
