= Terminalia circumalata =

Scientific classification
- Kingdom: Plantae
- Clade: Tracheophytes
- Clade: Angiosperms
- Clade: Eudicots
- Clade: Rosids
- Order: Myrtales
- Family: Combretaceae
- Genus: Terminalia
- Species: T. circumalata

Binomial name
- Terminalia circumalata F.Muell.

Species of tree

Terminalia circumalata, is a tree of the family Combretaceae. It is endemic to Western Australia. It is found in the Pilbara region of Western Australia.
