= Terminalia littoralis =

Scientific classification
- Kingdom: Plantae
- Clade: Tracheophytes
- Clade: Angiosperms
- Clade: Eudicots
- Clade: Rosids
- Order: Myrtales
- Family: Combretaceae
- Genus: Terminalia
- Species: T. littoralis

Binomial name
- Terminalia littoralis L.

Species of plant

Terminalia littoralis is a large tropical tree in the leadwood tree family, Combretaceae. It grows to 35 metres (115 ft) tall, with an upright, symmetrical crown and horizontal branches, growing in the coast, valuated by its timber. It grows on exposed coastal headlands and along beaches, in Samoa and Fiji islands where it can withstand drought, strong winds, and salt spray. It is related to Terminalia catappa.
