= Terminalia volucris =

Rosewood

Scientific classification
- Kingdom: Plantae
- Clade: Tracheophytes
- Clade: Angiosperms
- Clade: Eudicots
- Clade: Rosids
- Order: Myrtales
- Family: Combretaceae
- Genus: Terminalia
- Species: T. volucris

Binomial name
- Terminalia volucris Benth.

Species of tree

Terminalia volucris, commonly known as rosewood, is a tree of the family Combretaceae native to northern Australia.

The dense shrub or tree can grow to a height of 20 metres (66 ft) in height and is deciduous. It blooms between June and December producing white-cream-yellow flowers.

It is found in the Kimberley region of Western Australia growing in sandy-clay soils over basalt or sandstone.
