= White olive =

White olive may refer to:

- Canarium album, a fruit used in Southeast-Asian cuisines
- Terminalia arbuscula, a plant native to Jamaica
