= Wild peach =

A wild peach is a wild growing form of the Peach (Prunus persica).

Wild peach may also refer to other flowering tree plants not closely related to the peach or each other:

- Kiggelaria africana, native to southern and eastern Africa
- Santalum acuminatum, also known as Quandong, a hemiparasitic plant widely dispersed throughout the central deserts and southern areas of Australia
- Terminalia carpentariae, native to northern Australia

== See also ==
- Wild Peach Village, Texas
