= Terminalia parviflora =

Conservation status
- Vulnerable (IUCN 2.3)

Scientific classification
- Kingdom: Plantae
- Clade: Tracheophytes
- Clade: Angiosperms
- Clade: Eudicots
- Clade: Rosids
- Order: Myrtales
- Family: Combretaceae
- Genus: Terminalia
- Species: T. parviflora

Binomial name
- Terminalia parviflora Thwaites

Species of flowering plant

Terminalia parviflora is a species of plant in the Combretaceae family. It is endemic to Sri Lanka.
