= Terminalia kleinii =

Conservation status
- Near Threatened (IUCN 2.3)

Scientific classification
- Kingdom: Plantae
- Clade: Tracheophytes
- Clade: Angiosperms
- Clade: Eudicots
- Clade: Rosids
- Order: Myrtales
- Family: Combretaceae
- Genus: Terminalia
- Species: T. kleinii

Binomial name
- Terminalia kleinii (Exell) Gere & Boatwr.

Synonyms
- Buchenavia kleinii Exell (1953); Buchenavia kleinii var. paulensis N.F.Mattos; Buchenavia igarataensis N.F.Mattos

Species of flowering plant

Terminalia kleinii is a species of flowering plant in the Combretaceae family. It is a tree endemic to southeastern and southern Brazil. It is threatened by habitat loss.
