= Aiteta apriformis =

Scientific classification
- Kingdom: Animalia
- Phylum: Arthropoda
- Class: Insecta
- Order: Lepidoptera
- Superfamily: Noctuoidea
- Family: Nolidae
- Genus: Aiteta
- Species: A. apriformis

Binomial name
- Aiteta apriformis (Walker, 1857)

Synonyms
- Capotena apriformis Walker, 1857

Species of moth

Aiteta apriformis is a moth of the family Nolidae first described by Francis Walker in 1857. It is found in Sri Lanka.

Its larval food plants are members of the genus Terminalia.
