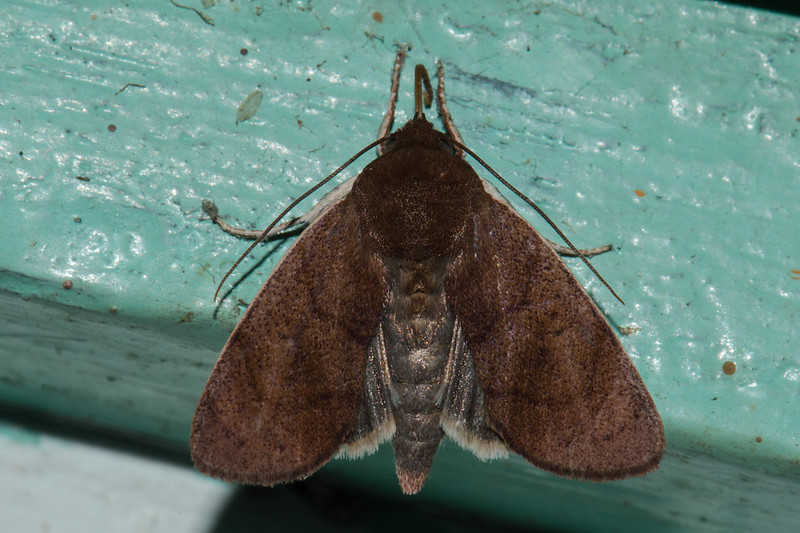
- Aiteta damnipennis - dorsal view - photographed in Assam, India
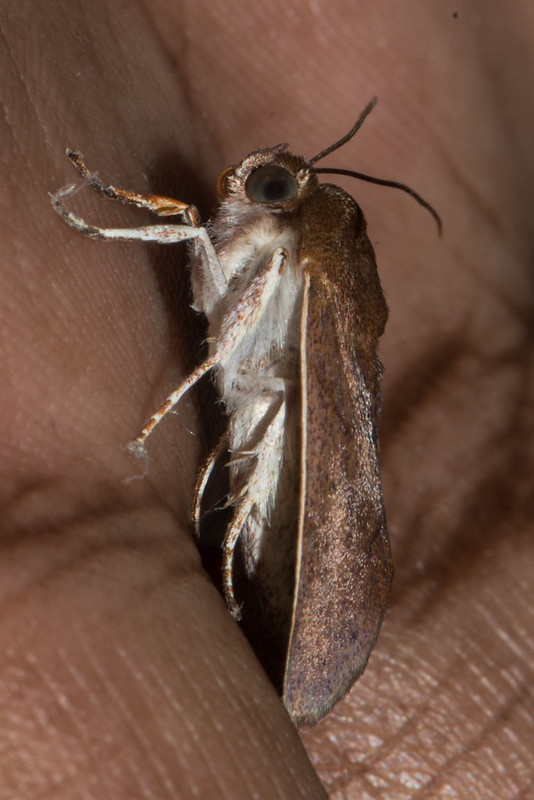
- Aiteta damnipennis - lateral view

Scientific classification
- Kingdom: Animalia
- Phylum: Arthropoda
- Class: Insecta
- Order: Lepidoptera
- Superfamily: Noctuoidea
- Family: Nolidae
- Genus: Aiteta
- Species: A. damnipennis

Binomial name
- Aiteta damnipennis (Walker, 1865)

Synonyms
- Phanaca damnipennis Walker, 1865

= Aiteta damnipennis =

Species of moth

Aiteta damnipennis is a moth of the family Nolidae first described by Francis Walker in 1865. It is found in Sri Lanka, India, Peninsular Malaysia, Sumatra, Borneo and Sulawesi.

Larval food plant is Terminalia species.
