= Terminalia hoehneana =

Conservation status
- Near Threatened (IUCN 3.1)

Scientific classification
- Kingdom: Plantae
- Clade: Tracheophytes
- Clade: Angiosperms
- Clade: Eudicots
- Clade: Rosids
- Order: Myrtales
- Family: Combretaceae
- Genus: Terminalia
- Species: T. hoehneana

Binomial name
- Terminalia hoehneana (N.F.Mattos) Gere & Boatwr.

Synonyms
- Buchenavia hoehneana N.F.Mattos

Species of flowering plant

Terminalia hoehneana is a species of flowering plant in the Combretaceae family. It is endemic to Brazil, found only in a few localities of the Atlantic Forest. It is threatened by habitat loss.

== Taxonomy ==
The species was first described as Buchenavia hoehneana by Nilza Fischer de Mattos in 1967, and published in Loefgrenia; Communicações avulsas de botânica. In 2017 Jephris Gere and James Stephen Boatwright placed the species in genus Terminalia as T. hoehneana.
