= Terminalia novocaledonica =

Conservation status
- Vulnerable (IUCN 2.3)

Scientific classification
- Kingdom: Plantae
- Clade: Tracheophytes
- Clade: Angiosperms
- Clade: Eudicots
- Clade: Rosids
- Order: Myrtales
- Family: Combretaceae
- Genus: Terminalia
- Species: T. novocaledonica

Binomial name
- Terminalia novocaledonica Däniker

Species of flowering plant

Terminalia novocaledonica is a species of plant in the Combretaceae family. It is endemic to New Caledonia.
