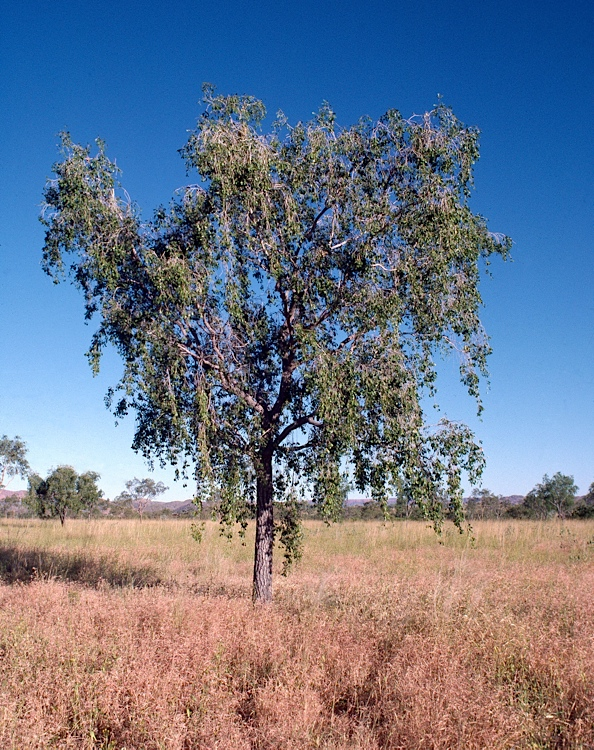

Scientific classification
- Kingdom: Plantae
- Clade: Tracheophytes
- Clade: Angiosperms
- Clade: Eudicots
- Clade: Rosids
- Order: Myrtales
- Family: Combretaceae
- Genus: Terminalia
- Species: T. arostrata

Binomial name
- Terminalia arostrata Ewart & O.B.Davies

= Terminalia arostrata =

Crocodile tree

Species of tree

Terminalia arostrata, commonly known as crocodile tree or nutwood, is a tree of the family Combretaceae native to northern parts of Australia.

The tree typically grows to a height of 4.5 to 12 metres (15 to 39 ft) in height and deciduous to semi-deciduous. It blooms between July and November producing white, orange and red flowers. The tree has a rounded crown and pendulous branches and produces edible seeds. The leaves are 3 to 13 centimetres (1.2 to 5.1 in) long and 10 to 45 centimetres (3.94 to 17.72 in) wide and has beaked fruit that persists year round.

The species was first described by botanists Alfred James Ewart and O.B.Davies in 1917 in The Flora of the Northern Territory.

It is found on flat to slightly undulating places in swampy areas and on basaltic plains in the Kimberley region of Western Australia, the Northern Territory and Queensland growing in alluvium and heavy soils.
