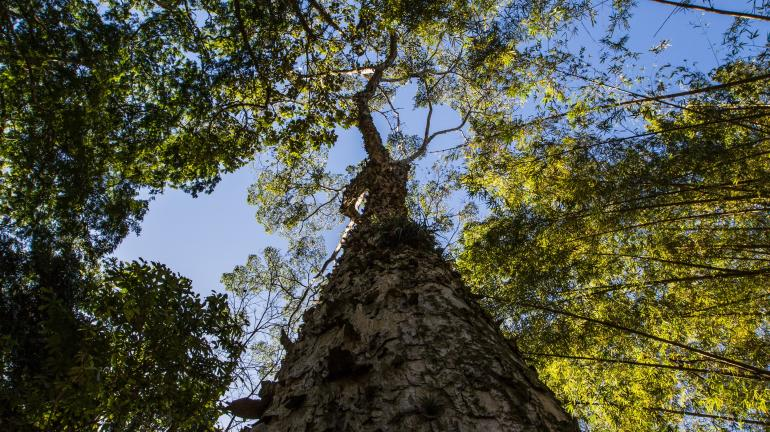

Conservation status
- Endangered (IUCN 3.1)

Scientific classification
- Kingdom: Plantae
- Clade: Tracheophytes
- Clade: Angiosperms
- Clade: Eudicots
- Clade: Rosids
- Order: Myrtales
- Family: Combretaceae
- Genus: Terminalia
- Species: T. acuminata

Binomial name
- Terminalia acuminata (Fr. Allem.) Eichl.

= Terminalia acuminata =

Species of tree

Terminalia acuminata is a tree species in the Combretaceae family. It was endemic to the Atlantic Forest in Brazil. The species was believed to be extinct in the wild from habitat loss, entering the IUCN Red List in 1998, with two individuals remaining in the Rio de Janeiro Botanical Garden.

In May 2016, it was reported that T. acuminata specimens have been discovered in the Serra da Tiririca State Park in Itacoatiara, Niterói; in the Mendanha State Park, in Nova Iguaçu; in the Tijuca National Park, and in the Municipal Natural Park of the City, in Gávea, in the city of Rio de Janeiro.
