= Terminalia kumpaja =

Conservation status
- Priority Three — Poorly Known Taxa (DEC)

Scientific classification
- Kingdom: Plantae
- Clade: Tracheophytes
- Clade: Angiosperms
- Clade: Eudicots
- Clade: Rosids
- Order: Myrtales
- Family: Combretaceae
- Genus: Terminalia
- Species: T. kumpaja

Binomial name
- Terminalia kumpaja R.L.Barrett

Species of tree

Terminalia kumpaja is a tree of the family Combretaceae native to northern Australia.

It is found in a few isolated areas along the coast in the Kimberley and Pilbara regions of Western Australia.
