= Terminalia fitzgeraldii =

Scientific classification
- Kingdom: Plantae
- Clade: Tracheophytes
- Clade: Angiosperms
- Clade: Eudicots
- Clade: Rosids
- Order: Myrtales
- Family: Combretaceae
- Genus: Terminalia
- Species: T. fitzgeraldii

Binomial name
- Terminalia fitzgeraldii C.A.Gardner

Species of tree

Terminalia fitzgeraldii is a tree of the family Combretaceae native to Western Australia.

The tree typically grows to a height of 3 to 10 metres (10 to 33 ft) in height but can reach up to 15 metres (49 ft) and is deciduous. It blooms between July and December producing white-yellow flowers.

It is found in rocky creek beds and on alluvial plains in the Kimberley region of Western Australia growing in lateritic clay soils.
