= Terminalia latifolia =

Conservation status
- Near Threatened (IUCN 2.3)

Scientific classification
- Kingdom: Plantae
- Clade: Tracheophytes
- Clade: Angiosperms
- Clade: Eudicots
- Clade: Rosids
- Order: Myrtales
- Family: Combretaceae
- Genus: Terminalia
- Species: T. latifolia

Binomial name
- Terminalia latifolia Sw.

Species of flowering plant

Terminalia latifolia is a species of plant in the Combretaceae family. It is found in Guatemala and Jamaica.
