= Terminalia glabrata =

Conservation status
- Near Threatened (IUCN 3.1)

Scientific classification
- Kingdom: Plantae
- Clade: Embryophytes
- Clade: Tracheophytes
- Clade: Angiosperms
- Clade: Eudicots
- Clade: Rosids
- Order: Myrtales
- Family: Combretaceae
- Genus: Terminalia
- Species: T. glabrata

Binomial name
- Terminalia glabrata G.Forst. (1786)

Synonyms
- Myrobalanus glabrata (G.Forst.) Kuntze (1891)

Species of flowering plant

Terminalia glabrata is a species of flowering plant in the family Combretaceae. In the Cook Islands it is commonly known as eastern tropical-almond, kauariki, or ‘enua. It is a tree native to the Cook Islands, Marquesas Islands, Samoan Islands, Society Islands, Tuamotu Archipelago, and Tubuai Islands in the South Pacific.

Terminalia glabrata is a tall broad-topped tree which sheds its leaves during the winter. It has large leaves (< 25 centimetres [9.8 in]) which are wide-oval in shape and widest near the tip and grow in terminal clusters. Fruits grow up to 4.5 centimetres (1.8 in) in length and are ovoid and flattened with blunt-edged wings.

In the Cook Islands it is native to the islands of Mangaia and Rarotonga, where it is widespread in interior slope forest from low to mid-elevations.

Four varieties are accepted:

- Terminalia glabrata var. brownii Fosberg & Sachet – Marquesas Islands
- Terminalia glabrata var. glabrata – Cook Islands, Samoan Islands, and Society Islands
- Terminalia glabrata var. haroldii (Exell) Fosberg & Sachet – Tubuai Islands
- Terminalia glabrata var. koariki (Exell) Fosberg & Sachet – Tuamotu Islands (Mangareva)
