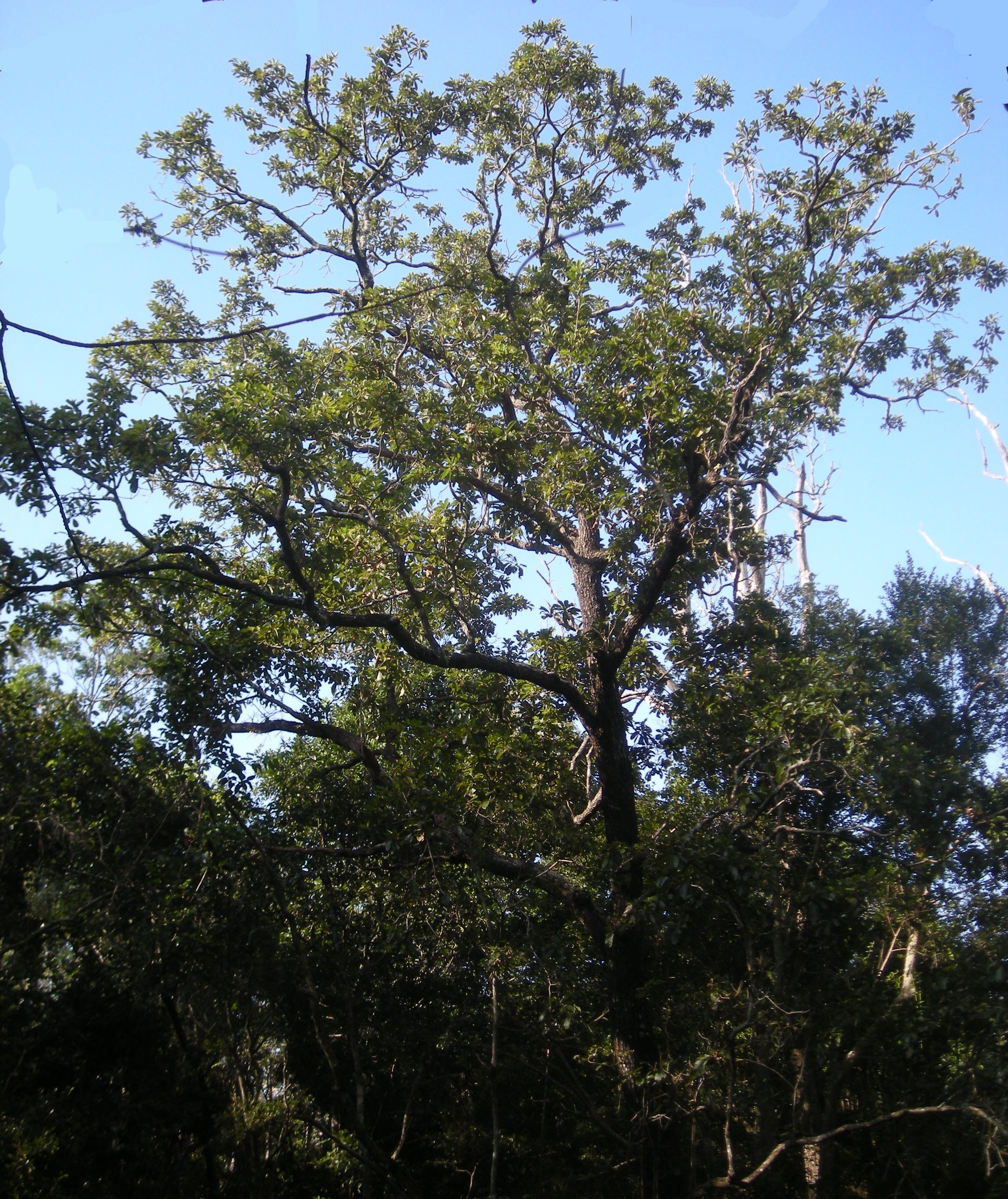

Scientific classification
- Kingdom: Plantae
- Clade: Tracheophytes
- Clade: Angiosperms
- Clade: Eudicots
- Clade: Rosids
- Order: Myrtales
- Family: Combretaceae
- Genus: Terminalia
- Species: T. porphyrocarpa

Binomial name
- Terminalia porphyrocarpa F.Muell. ex Benth.

= Terminalia porphyrocarpa =

Species of tree

Terminalia porphyrocarpa is a species of tree native to dry rainforests of Northeastern Australia and Papua New Guinea.

== Image gallery ==
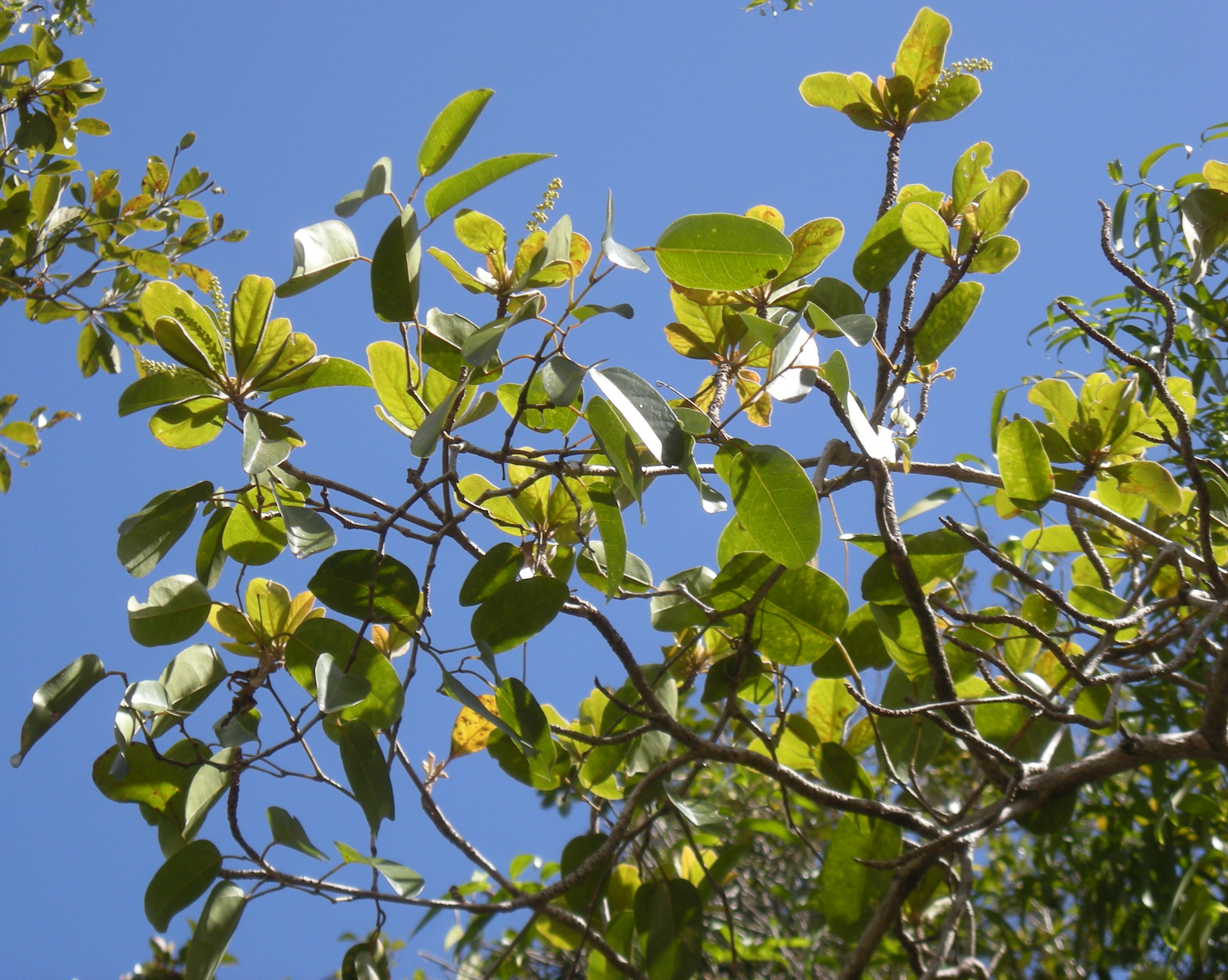
T. porphyrocarpa foliage and flowers

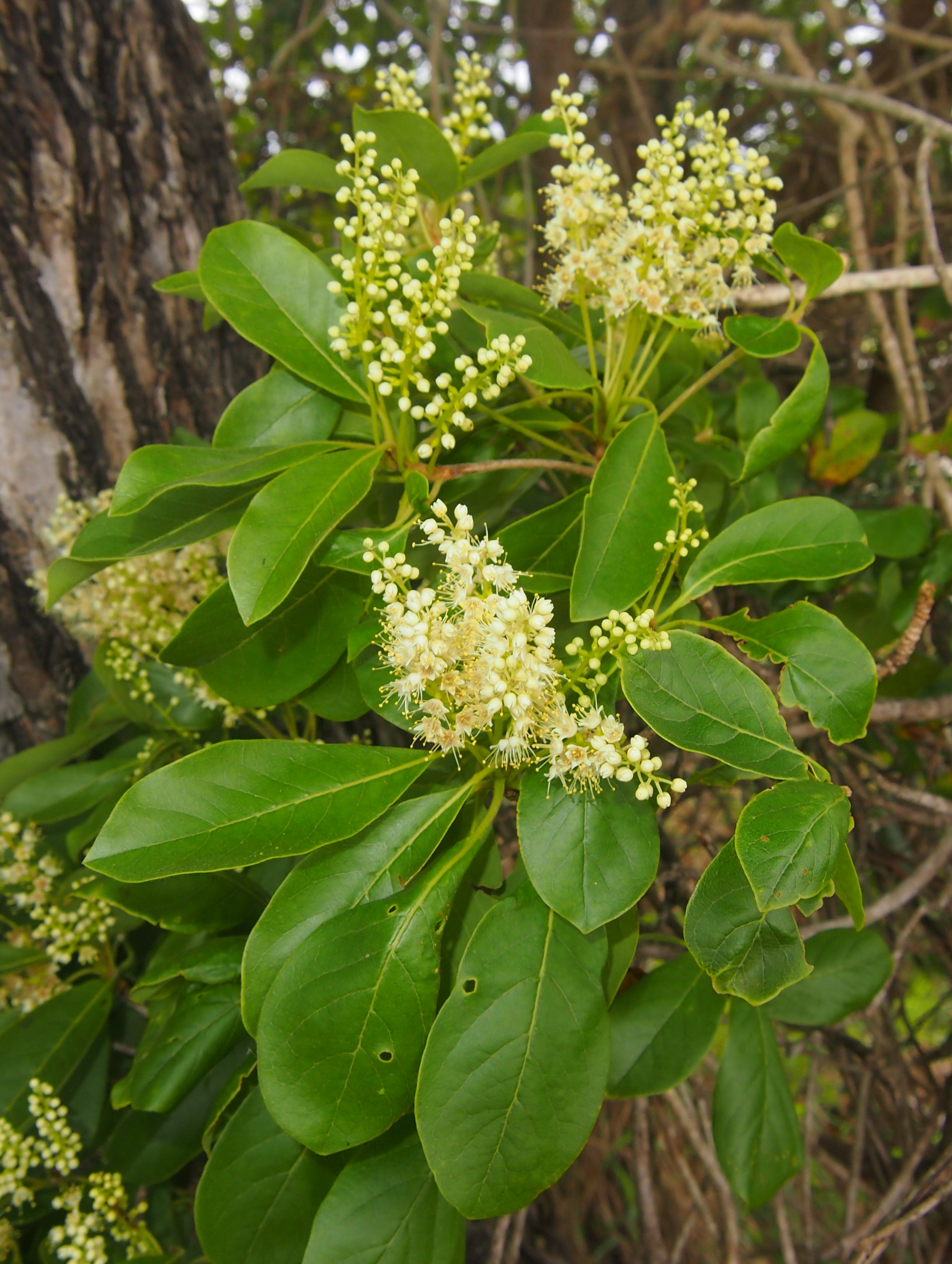
T. porphyrocarpa foliage and flowers

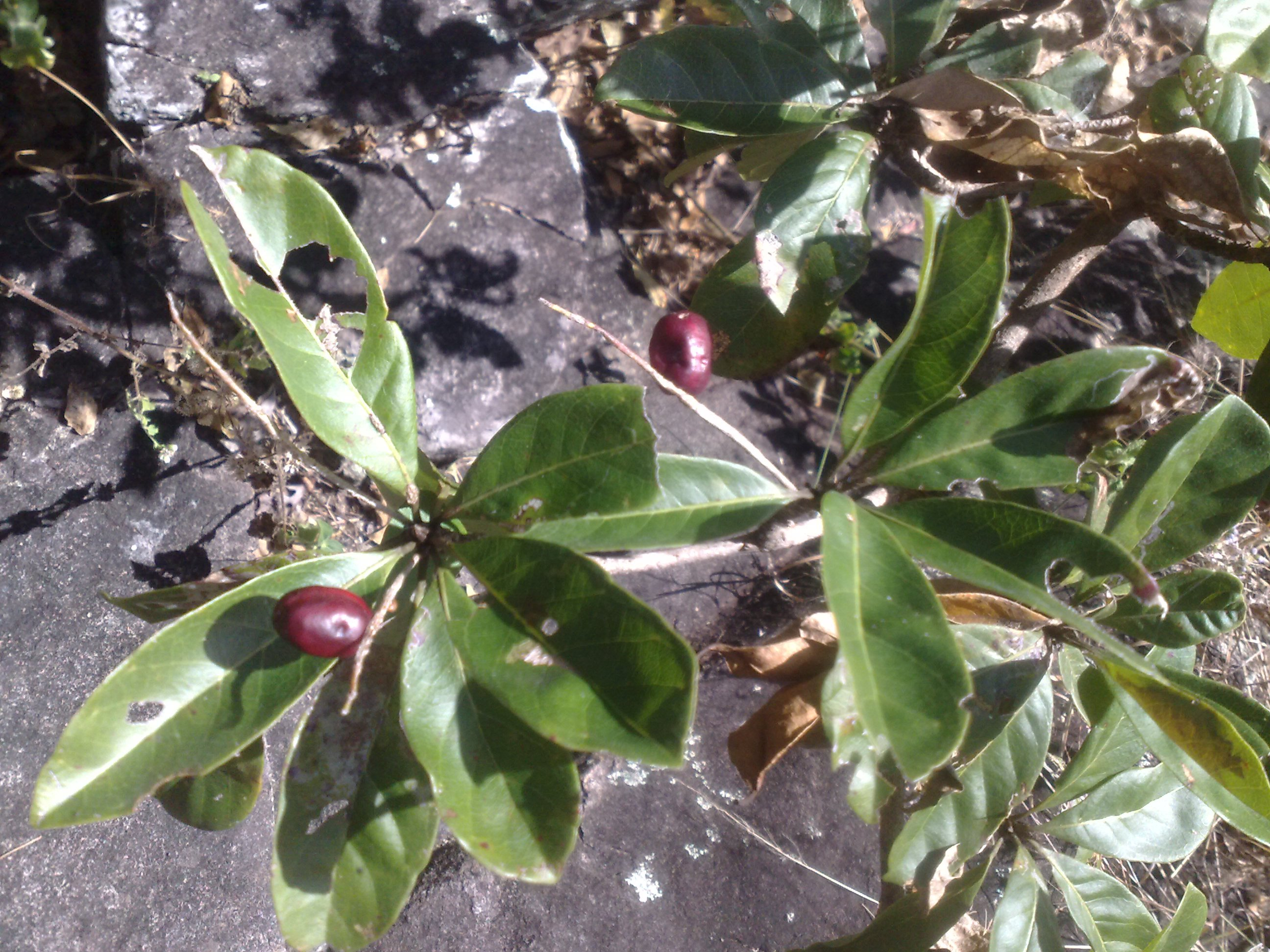
