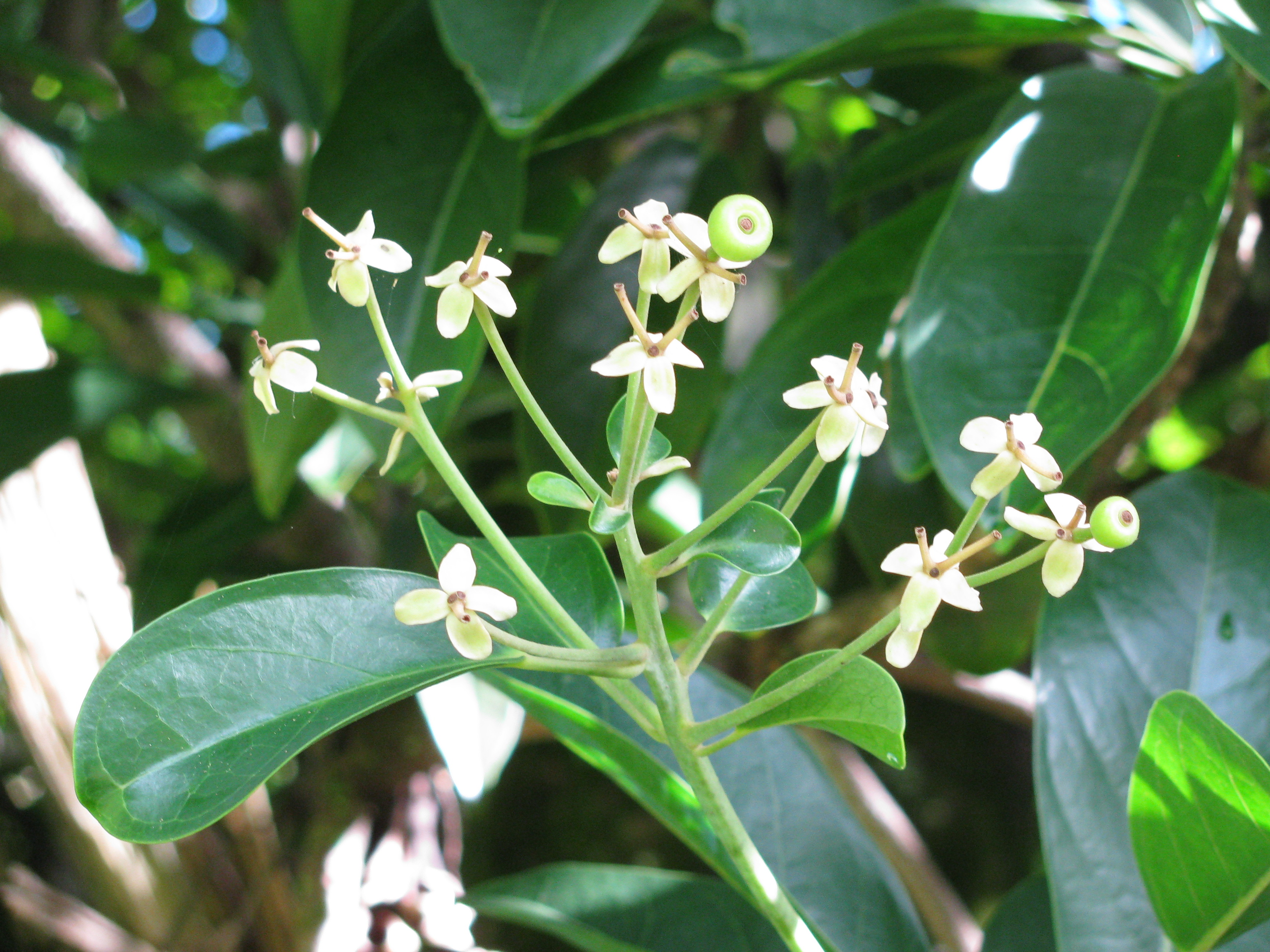
- Flowers and leaves

Conservation status
- Near Threatened (IUCN 3.1)

Scientific classification
- Kingdom: Plantae
- Clade: Tracheophytes
- Clade: Angiosperms
- Clade: Eudicots
- Clade: Rosids
- Order: Myrtales
- Family: Combretaceae
- Genus: Terminalia
- Species: T. megalocarpa

Binomial name
- Terminalia megalocarpa Exell

= Terminalia megalocarpa =

Species of tree

Terminalia megalocarpa is a rainforest tree of eastern New Guinea and Bougainville Island. It is in the family Combretaceae. Its common name is to-oma. Its most interesting feature is that its seeds, 5 cm (2.0 in) long, have five cotyledons rather than the two found in almost all other dicot plants.
