= Terminalia pellucida =

Conservation status
- Vulnerable (IUCN 2.3)

Scientific classification
- Kingdom: Plantae
- Clade: Tracheophytes
- Clade: Angiosperms
- Clade: Eudicots
- Clade: Rosids
- Order: Myrtales
- Family: Combretaceae
- Genus: Terminalia
- Species: T. pellucida

Binomial name
- Terminalia pellucida Presl.

Species of flowering plant

Terminalia pellucida is a species of plant in the Combretaceae family. It is endemic to the Philippines. It is threatened by habitat loss.
