= Terminalia bentii =

Conservation status
- Endangered (IUCN 2.3)

Scientific classification
- Kingdom: Plantae
- Clade: Tracheophytes
- Clade: Angiosperms
- Clade: Eudicots
- Clade: Rosids
- Order: Myrtales
- Family: Combretaceae
- Genus: Terminalia
- Species: T. bentii

Binomial name
- Terminalia bentii (Baker) Gere & Boatwr. (2017)

Synonyms
- Anogeissus bentii Baker (1895)

Species of tree

Terminalia bentii is a species of plant in the Combretaceae family. It is endemic to the fog woodlands of Yemen.

The species was first described as Anogeissus bentii by John Gilbert Baker in 1895. In 2017 the genus Anogeissus was made a synonym of Terminalia, and the species was renamed Terminalia bentii.
