= Terminalia bursarina =

Bendee

Scientific classification
- Kingdom: Plantae
- Clade: Tracheophytes
- Clade: Angiosperms
- Clade: Eudicots
- Clade: Rosids
- Order: Myrtales
- Family: Combretaceae
- Genus: Terminalia
- Species: T. bursarina

Binomial name
- Terminalia bursarina F.Muell.

Species of tree

Terminalia bursarina, commonly known as bendee, is a tree of the family Combretaceae native to northern parts of Australia.

The erect and straggly tree typically grows to a height of 8 metres (26 ft) in height and has deeply fissured bark. It blooms between June and September producing white-yellow flowers. The species is very similar to Terminalia canescens but has smaller leaves and fruits.

It is in rock crevices and in river beds in the Kimberley region of Western Australia and the Northern Territory growing in sandy-stony soils over sandstone.
