= Terminalia triptera =

Scientific classification
- Kingdom: Plantae
- Clade: Tracheophytes
- Clade: Angiosperms
- Clade: Eudicots
- Clade: Rosids
- Order: Myrtales
- Family: Combretaceae
- Genus: Terminalia
- Species: T. triptera

Binomial name
- Terminalia triptera Stapf, 1895

Synonyms
- Terminalia hainanensis Exell, 1934; Terminalia obliqua Craib, 1912; Terminalia nigrovenulosa Pierre ex Gagnep. (1914); Terminalia tripteroides Craib, 1912

Species of tree

Terminalia triptera is a species of tree in the family Combretaceae: also known as Terminalia nigrovenulosa; it is distributed in China, Indo-China, and peninsular Malaysia.
