= Terminalia polycarpa =

Scientific classification
- Kingdom: Plantae
- Clade: Tracheophytes
- Clade: Angiosperms
- Clade: Eudicots
- Clade: Rosids
- Order: Myrtales
- Family: Combretaceae
- Genus: Terminalia
- Species: T. polycarpa

Binomial name
- Terminalia polycarpa Engl. & Diels

Synonyms
- Terminalia hecistocarpa Engl. & Diels; Terminalia kelleri Engl. & Diels

Species of tree

Terminalia polycarpa is a small African tree in the family Combretaceae. It is native to Ethiopia, Kenya, and Somalia. The flowers are white or cream in hairy spikes up to 11 cm (4.3 in) long.
