= Terminalia neotaliala =

Conservation status
- Vulnerable (IUCN 3.1)

Scientific classification
- Kingdom: Plantae
- Clade: Tracheophytes
- Clade: Angiosperms
- Clade: Eudicots
- Clade: Rosids
- Order: Myrtales
- Family: Combretaceae
- Genus: Terminalia
- Species: T. neotaliala

Binomial name
- Terminalia neotaliala Capuron

Synonyms
- Terminalia taliala H. Perrier

Species of tree

Terminalia neotaliala is a tree growing to 8 m (26 ft) in the leadwood tree family, Combretaceae. It is endemic to dry forests in Diana Region and Sava Region of northern Madagascar at elevations of 50-300 m and introduced to Chad.
