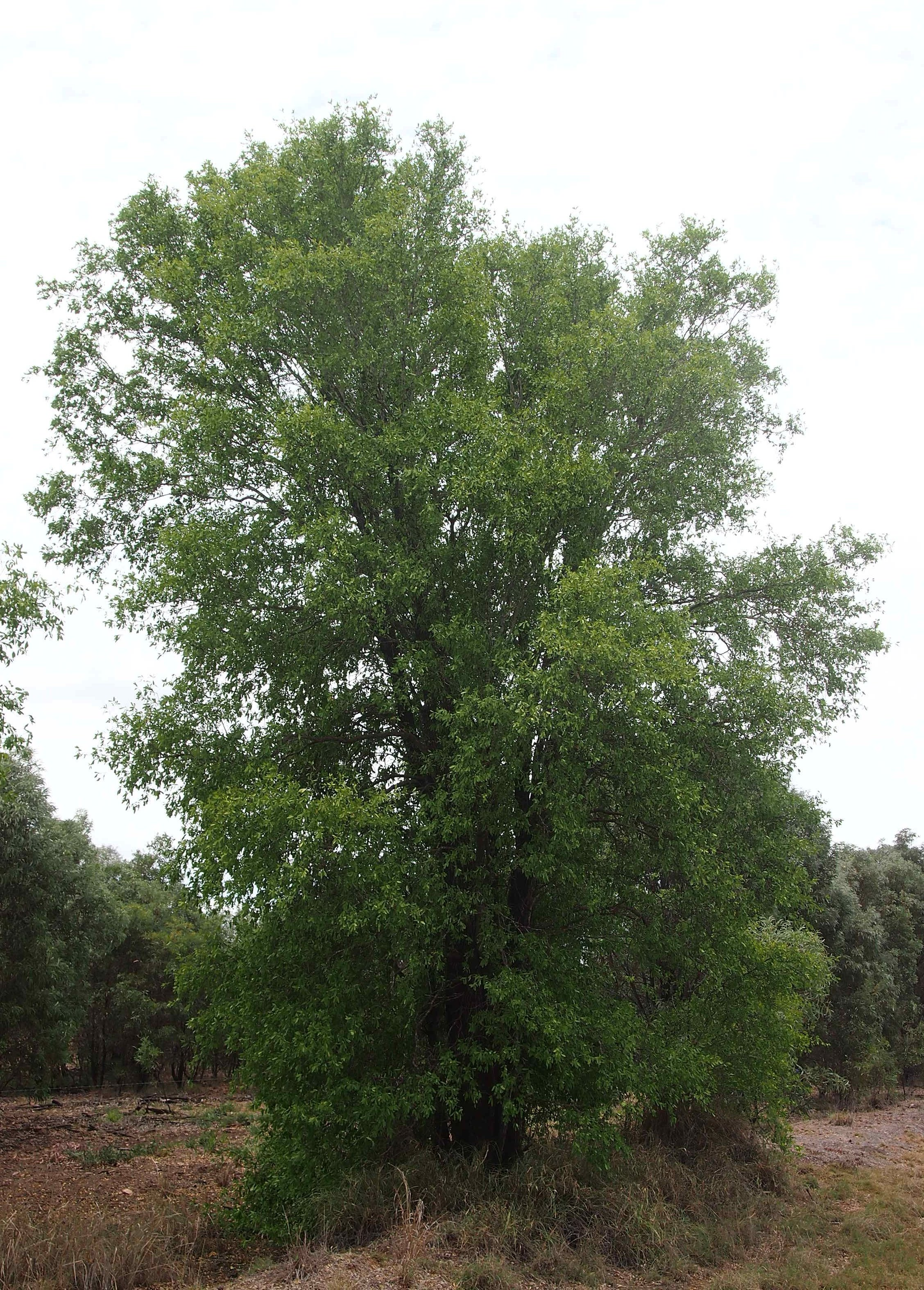

Scientific classification
- Kingdom: Plantae
- Clade: Embryophytes
- Clade: Tracheophytes
- Clade: Spermatophytes
- Clade: Angiosperms
- Clade: Eudicots
- Clade: Rosids
- Order: Myrtales
- Family: Combretaceae
- Genus: Terminalia
- Species: T. oblongata

Binomial name
- Terminalia oblongata F.Muell.

= Terminalia oblongata =

Species of flowering plant

Terminalia oblongata, commonly known as yellow-wood or rosewood, is a species of plant in the Combretaceae family. It is native to Australia. The mean maximum and minimum annual temperatures suitable for its growth are within the range 22 - 38 °C, though it can tolerate 12 - 44 °C as well.
