= Terminalia richii =

Conservation status
- Endangered (IUCN 3.1)

Scientific classification
- Kingdom: Plantae
- Clade: Tracheophytes
- Clade: Angiosperms
- Clade: Eudicots
- Clade: Rosids
- Order: Myrtales
- Family: Combretaceae
- Genus: Terminalia
- Species: T. richii

Binomial name
- Terminalia richii A.Gray (1854)

Species of forest tree

Terminalia richii, with the common name malili, is an upright forest tree that is native to the Samoan Islands.

The wood grown on this tree can be used mainly for construction and timber, and for other numerous purposes.

== Description ==
Mature Terminalia richii trees are usually tall and upright. The species is usually distinguished from other trees because it emerges from the rainforest canopies with a height ranging from 25–35 m (82–115 ft).

Its leaves have a dark green color on top and have a lighter green coloration underneath. The leaves are affixed to the tips of the branches. In fact, the genus name Terminalia comes from the Latin word terminus, which refers to the leaves appearing at the furthest tips of the shoots. Also, the leaves is what makes Malili distinguishable from other trees that are very similar to it. The leaves of Malili are generally smaller and narrower with a lanceolate shape.

The bark of Malili is gray and is usually covered with mosses and lichens. The seeds of this tree are usually covered with a fleshy layer. A mature tree is rather large and can grow up to 35 m (115 ft).

=== Flowers and fruit ===
Flowers of Terminalia richii are generally a blend of yellow and white and are located at the end of the branches. They are arranged in clusters of axillary spikes. Malili flowers are also five-lobed and consist of ten anthers. Flowering in Malili usually occur from September and continue to January. Flowering and fruiting are poor in Malili because of the environmental conditions in which they live in. Common cyclones in the Samoan archipelago damage the fruits and flowers in these trees. Maturation of the fruit of Terminalia richii varies depending on the location of the tree. The lower the altitude of the tree, the faster the fruit ripens. Mature fruits bear a reddish-purple color. Fruits are usually located at the top of the tree and are usually collected by climbing the tree or using other proper equipment. Fruit are not eaten by humans, but is a good source of food for birds like pigeons, doves and manumea (an endangered bird in Samoa). The fruit is usually removed before collecting and using the seeds.

== Distribution ==
Malili (Terminalia richii) is an endangered species found in the lowland areas and lower montane forests of the Samoan archipelago. It can grow in a variety of elevations from 5–830 m (16–2,723 ft). Malili is native to the Pacific islands of Samoa and American Samoa. In addition, the tree was also found in the central South Pacific island of Niue, but is now extinct in the wild and in recent years has been reintroduced in trial wood lots.

Malili was not very frequent in Samoa to begin with. Because of agricultural activities and numerous cyclones, the population of Malili has declined dramatically, making it endangered. Numbers have decreased the most in Upolu, an island in the Samoan archipelago.

It grows in a variety of elevations but is usually found in both lower montane forests and lowland tropical rainforests.

=== Habitat and ecology ===
Terminalia richii is adapted to maritime, moist/humid and tropical climates. Its native habitat experiences a precipitation zone that ranges from 2,050–3,250 mm (80–130 in) per year or more, mostly during the summer. The annual temperature of its habitat ranges from 24–27 °C (75–81 °F). Malili grows in fertile and well-drained soil. It prefers soil that originates from volcanic activity, or basaltic soil. The soil is also usually heavy-textured. Malili protrudes from the canopy of rainforests because it grows best under high and intense amount of sunlight. Because of this requirement, Malili has a very low potential to become an invasive plant. Malili does interact with other species and depends on them for its reproduction. Species of birds including pigeons, doves and bats are pollinators of Malili and are also used for seed dispersal.

== Uses ==
Terminalia richii have a wide range of usage, from timber to construction. Malili is popularly used for building canoes. Timber from this tree is used for construction of buildings. The timber is light with a density of 550 kg (1,210 lb) per square meter. In addition to constructing buildings, the timber is also used for paneling and building furniture for houses. Although its timber is very useful, usage is very limited now due to the fact that the tree is now endangered. In addition, Malili is a preferable tree to use for its timber because of its fast initial growth and a higher resistance to cyclones compared to the rest of the plantation in Samoa. The fruit of the tree is attractive to pigeons, and it is sometimes used for pigeon hunting.

== Conservation ==
The lowland forests of Samoa are damaged and degraded because of a dramatic increase in agricultural activity and deforestation. In addition, regular occurring cyclones also add to the destruction of the forests. Thirdly, the native vine Merremia peltata (which has become an invasive species in other areas) has interfered with the regeneration of the forestry. The vine does this by basically strangling the vegetation. Since Terminalia richii is popular for its timber, it should be conserved and sustained to prevent complete extinction.

Terminalia richii can be propagated from seed and by root cuttings. However, production of seeds in mature trees will be hindered because of cyclones. Also, Malili has a relatively low germination rate of less than 50%. Therefore, the usage of both seeds and root cuttings together is more effective in propagating the plant for restoration projects. Another tree species, Mailkara samoensis, is popular for its timber and is also endangered along with Malili.
