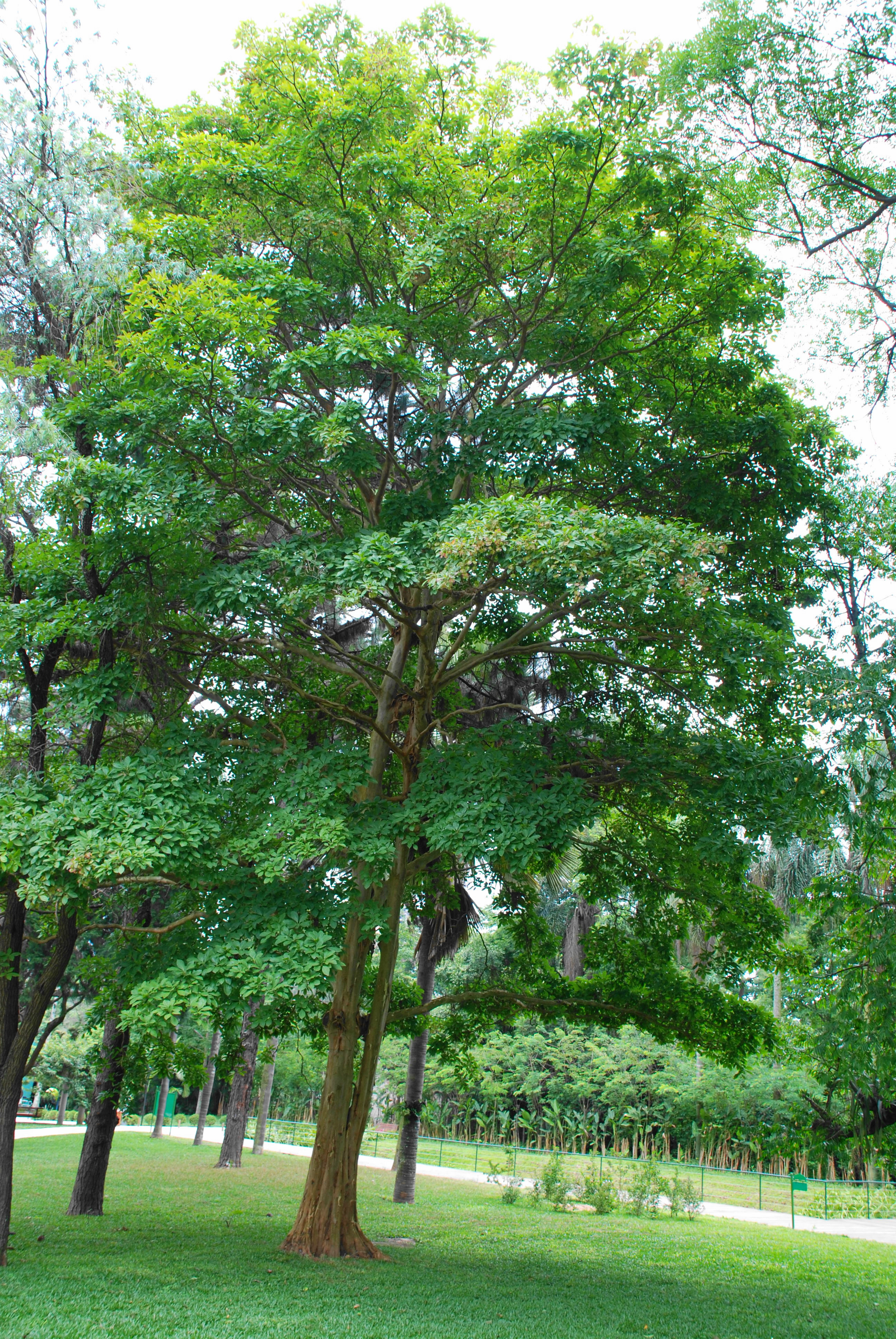

Conservation status
- Vulnerable (IUCN 2.3)

Scientific classification
- Kingdom: Plantae
- Clade: Tracheophytes
- Clade: Angiosperms
- Clade: Eudicots
- Clade: Rosids
- Order: Myrtales
- Family: Combretaceae
- Genus: Terminalia
- Species: T. kuhlmannii

Binomial name
- Terminalia kuhlmannii Alwan & Stace

= Terminalia kuhlmannii =

Species of flowering plant

Terminalia kuhlmannii is a species of plant in the Combretaceae family. It is endemic to Brazil. It is threatened by habitat loss.
