= Terminalia rerei =

Conservation status
- Vulnerable (IUCN 2.3)

Scientific classification
- Kingdom: Plantae
- Clade: Tracheophytes
- Clade: Angiosperms
- Clade: Eudicots
- Clade: Rosids
- Order: Myrtales
- Family: Combretaceae
- Genus: Terminalia
- Species: T. rerei

Binomial name
- Terminalia rerei Coode

Species of flowering plant

Terminalia rerei is a species of plant in the Combretaceae family. It is endemic to the Solomon Islands. It is threatened by habitat loss.
