= Terminalia cunninghamii =

Pindan quondong

Scientific classification
- Kingdom: Plantae
- Clade: Embryophytes
- Clade: Tracheophytes
- Clade: Spermatophytes
- Clade: Angiosperms
- Clade: Eudicots
- Clade: Rosids
- Order: Myrtales
- Family: Combretaceae
- Genus: Terminalia
- Species: T. cunninghamii

Binomial name
- Terminalia cunninghamii C.A.Gardner

Species of tree

Terminalia cunninghamii, commonly known as pindan quondong, pindan walnut or kalumburu almond, is a tree or shrub of the family Combretaceae native to Western Australia. Some Aboriginal people know the plant as kumpaja.

The tree or shrub typically grows to a height of 1.5 to 8 metres (5 to 26 ft) in height and is deciduous. It blooms between January and October producing white-yellow flowers. It will fruit after two or three years, the nut that is produced is edible and when uncooked tastes like almond but when roasted tastes more like cashew nuts.

It is found among sandstone outcrops and on dunes in the Kimberley region of Western Australia growing in sandy soils.

A project is under way as of 2021 to cultivate the tree alongside orchards of gubinge (Terminalia ferdinandiana, a.k.a. Kakadu plum) in the Broome area.
