= Terminalia bucidoides =

Conservation status
- Least Concern (IUCN 3.1)

Scientific classification
- Kingdom: Plantae
- Clade: Tracheophytes
- Clade: Angiosperms
- Clade: Eudicots
- Clade: Rosids
- Order: Myrtales
- Family: Combretaceae
- Genus: Terminalia
- Species: T. bucidoides

Binomial name
- Terminalia bucidoides Standley & L.O. Williams

Species of flowering plant

Terminalia bucidoides is a species of plant in the Combretaceae family. It is found in Costa Rica, Honduras, Nicaragua, and Panama.
