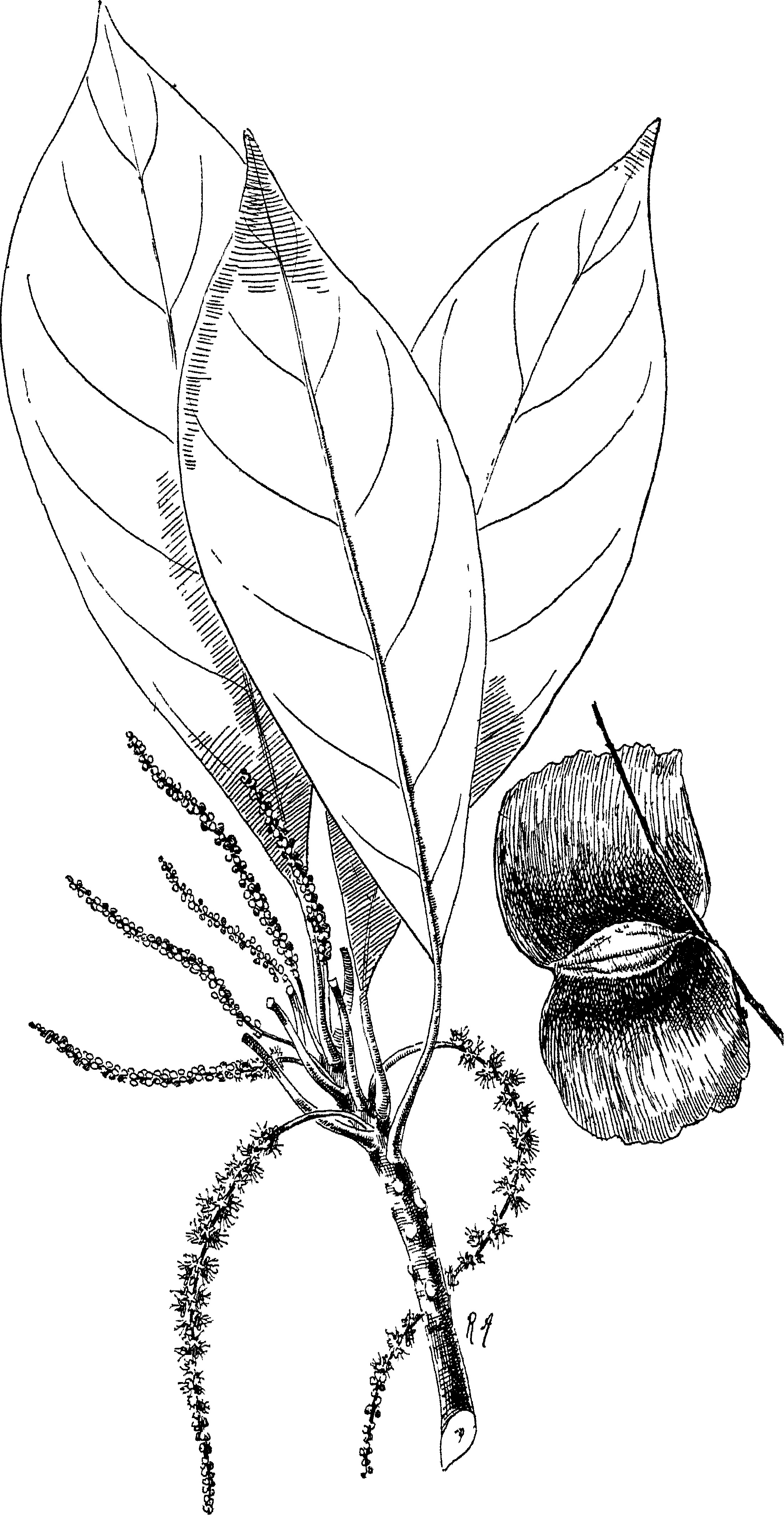

Conservation status
- Least Concern (IUCN 3.1)

Scientific classification
- Kingdom: Plantae
- Clade: Tracheophytes
- Clade: Angiosperms
- Clade: Eudicots
- Clade: Rosids
- Order: Myrtales
- Family: Combretaceae
- Genus: Terminalia
- Species: T. calamansanai

Binomial name
- Terminalia calamansanai (Blanco) Rolfe, 1884

Synonyms
- List: Terminalia pyrifolia; (Presl) Kurz; Terminalia papilio; Hance; Terminalia latialata; C. T. White; Terminalia blancoi; Merrill; Terminalia bialata; Steud.; Terminalia bialata; F. Villar; Pentaptera pyrifolia; Presl; Pentaptera bialata; Roxb.; Myrobalanus pyrifolia; (Presl) Kuntze; Myrobalanus bialata; (Steud.) Kuntze; Gimbernatea calamansanay; Blanco

= Terminalia calamansanai =

Species of plant in the family Combretaceae

Terminalia calamansanai, also spelled Terminalia calamansanay (unresolved name), is a species of plant in the family Combretaceae. It has a large range in SE Asia, from Bangladesh to New Guinea.
