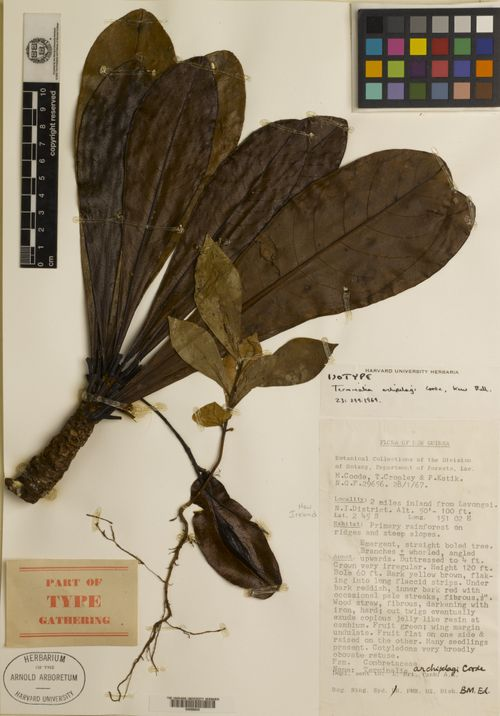

Conservation status
- Vulnerable (IUCN 3.1)

Scientific classification
- Kingdom: Plantae
- Clade: Tracheophytes
- Clade: Angiosperms
- Clade: Eudicots
- Clade: Rosids
- Order: Myrtales
- Family: Combretaceae
- Genus: Terminalia
- Species: T. archipelagi

Binomial name
- Terminalia archipelagi Coode

= Terminalia archipelagi =

Species of tree

Terminalia archipelagi is a species of plant in the Combretaceae family.

It is endemic to the islands of the Bismarck Archipelago, within Papua New Guinea.

It is threatened by habitat loss.
