= Terminalia cambodiana =

Scientific classification
- Kingdom: Plantae
- Clade: Tracheophytes
- Clade: Angiosperms
- Clade: Eudicots
- Clade: Rosids
- Order: Myrtales
- Family: Combretaceae
- Genus: Terminalia
- Species: T. cambodiana

Binomial name
- Terminalia cambodiana Gagnep., Notul. Syst. (Paris) 3: 284 (1916)

Species of tree

Terminalia cambodiana is a species of tree in the family Combretaceae, growing some 6–15 m tall with whitish-grey, exfoliating bark and large greenish branches. It is found in flooded forest communities of Cambodia and southern Vietnam.

There is a report of the trees growing infrequently in seasonally flooded forest along the Se Buy River alongside Na Kae village, Kham Khuean Kaeo District, Yasothon Province, northeast Thailand. These trees, with a dbh of 10 cm, grow mainly at 0 to 3m above the water low level, being flooded from 42 to 83 days a year.

Within the floodplain of the lake Tonle Sap, western Cambodia, T. cambodiana occurs rarely, in isolated pockets of forest within the Secondary scrubland (short tree-shrubland association) community, where sprawling shrubs and lianas form a closed canopy some 3-5m tall. In this area firewood collection was intense in the twentieth century. T. cambodiana and Diospyros cambodiana were extensively exploited for charcoal making in the beginning of the 20th century, and so became rare in the inundated floodplain. People also reported that availability of this tree decreased in the two years around 2007–2009, though it is still harvested.

The branches of the tree, when flooded at Tonle Sap, were one of the favoured spots for the hairy-nosed otter, Lutra sumatrana, to place its spraints.

Tâ' uë, ta-uah is its common name in Khmer. The wood of T. cambodiana is used in the construction of fishing dams, to make columns for buildings and to make charcoal. Its bark is used in traditional medicine to treat diarrhoea, fever, post-natal haemorrhage and fish-bites.
