= Terminalia reitzii =

Conservation status
- Vulnerable (IUCN 2.3)

Scientific classification
- Kingdom: Plantae
- Clade: Tracheophytes
- Clade: Angiosperms
- Clade: Eudicots
- Clade: Rosids
- Order: Myrtales
- Family: Combretaceae
- Genus: Terminalia
- Species: T. reitzii

Binomial name
- Terminalia reitzii Excell

Species of flowering plant

Terminalia reitzii is a species of plant in the Combretaceae family. It is endemic to Brazil, growing primarily in seasonally dry tropical forests in the southern part of the country. It is threatened by habitat loss.
