= Terminalia latipes =

Scientific classification
- Kingdom: Plantae
- Clade: Tracheophytes
- Clade: Angiosperms
- Clade: Eudicots
- Clade: Rosids
- Order: Myrtales
- Family: Combretaceae
- Genus: Terminalia
- Species: T. latipes

Binomial name
- Terminalia latipes Benth.

Species of tree

Terminalia latipes is a tree of the family Combretaceae native to northern Australia.

The tree or shrub typically grows to a height of 3 to 10 metres (10 to 33 ft) in height and is deciduous. It blooms between October and February producing white flowers.

It is found among rocky outcrops and on hills, floodplains and coastal dunes in the Kimberley region of Western Australia growing in sandy-loam-clay soils over sandstone.
