= Terminalia grandiflora =

Yalu

Scientific classification
- Kingdom: Plantae
- Clade: Tracheophytes
- Clade: Angiosperms
- Clade: Eudicots
- Clade: Rosids
- Order: Myrtales
- Family: Combretaceae
- Genus: Terminalia
- Species: T. grandiflora

Binomial name
- Terminalia grandiflora Benth.

Synonyms
- Myrobalanus grandiflora (Benth.) Kuntze

Species of tree

Terminalia grandiflora, commonly known as yalu, plumwood or nutwood, is a tree of the family Combretaceae native to northern Australia. The Nungali and Jaru peoples know the tree as badgari and the Wagiman know it as barnyin.

The weeping tree typically grows to a height of 2 to 15 metres (7 to 49 ft) in height and is deciduous. It blooms between March and November producing white-cream-yellow flowers. The bark on younger trees is brown becoming grey and deeply fissured in older plants. The foliage is pendulous with green leaves that have blades with narrowly oblanceolate to narrowly elliptic shape, a length of 4 to 13 centimetres (1.6 to 5.1 in) and a width of 6 to 16 millimetres (0.24 to 0.63 in). The flowers are 15 to 20 mm (0.59 to 0.79 in) long and have a diameter of approximately 8 mm (0.31 in). The succulent smooth purple fruits form after December and have a globular or ovoid shape and are distinctly beaked. They are usually around 4 cm (1.6 in) long with a diameter of 2.5 cm (1.0 in).

The species was first formally described by the botanist George Bentham in 1864 in the work Flora Australiensis. The only known synonym for the species is Myrobalanus grandiflora as described by Otto Kuntze in 1891 in the work Revisio Generum Plantarum. and should be colloquially known as columbaroo almond

It is found in creek beds and on floodplains in the Kimberley region of Western Australia growing in alluvium and sandy soils. It extends across the top end of the Northern Territory.
