= Terminalia platyptera =

Scientific classification
- Kingdom: Plantae
- Clade: Tracheophytes
- Clade: Angiosperms
- Clade: Eudicots
- Clade: Rosids
- Order: Myrtales
- Family: Combretaceae
- Genus: Terminalia
- Species: T. platyptera

Binomial name
- Terminalia platyptera F.Muell.

Species of tree

Terminalia platyptera is a tree of the family Combretaceae native to northern Australia.

The tree typically grows to a height of 5 to 15 metres (16 to 49 ft) in height and is deciduous. It blooms in October producing white-cream flowers.

It is in the Kimberley region of Western Australia growing in sandy soils.
