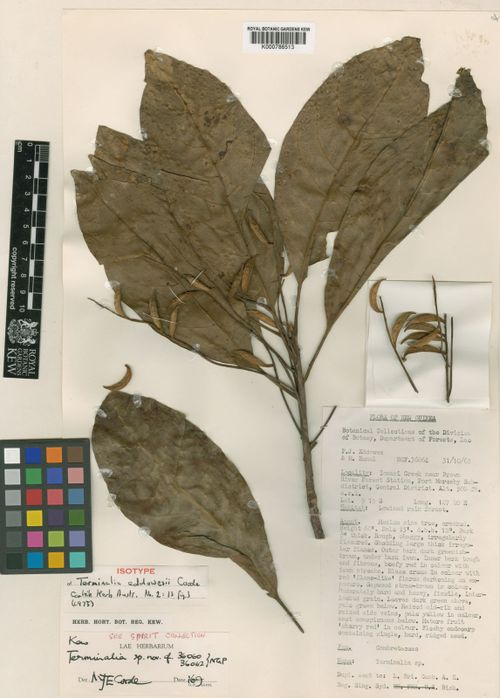

Conservation status
- Vulnerable (IUCN 3.1)

Scientific classification
- Kingdom: Plantae
- Clade: Tracheophytes
- Clade: Angiosperms
- Clade: Eudicots
- Clade: Rosids
- Order: Myrtales
- Family: Combretaceae
- Genus: Terminalia
- Species: T. eddowesii

Binomial name
- Terminalia eddowesii Coode

= Terminalia eddowesii =

Species of tree

Terminalia eddowesii is a species of plant in the Combretaceae family. It is endemic to the Central Province of Papua New Guinea, on the island of New Guinea. The species has been declared Vulnerable by the IUCN. It is threatened by habitat loss.
