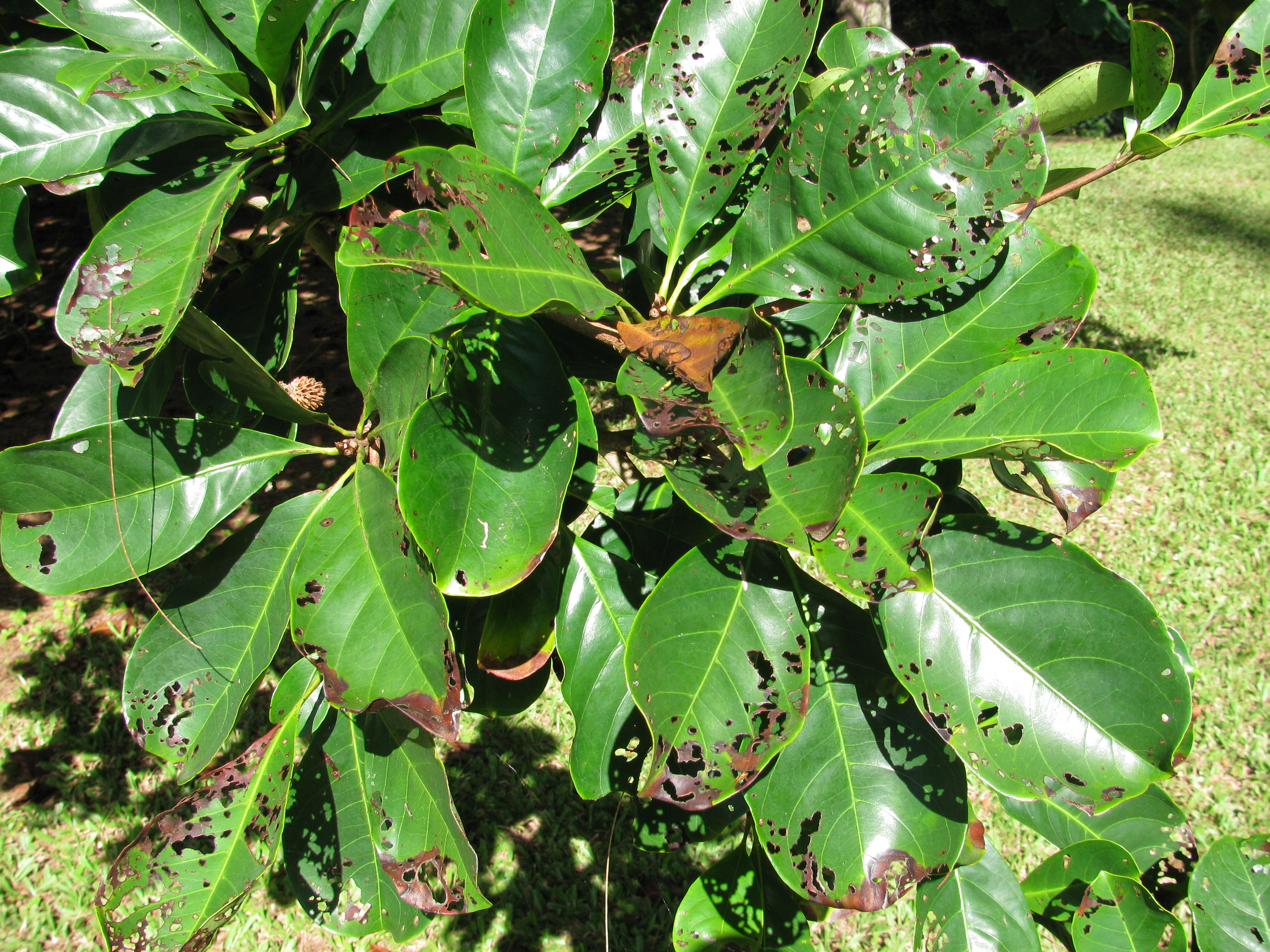
- Leaves

Conservation status
- Least Concern (IUCN 3.1)

Scientific classification
- Kingdom: Plantae
- Clade: Tracheophytes
- Clade: Angiosperms
- Clade: Eudicots
- Clade: Rosids
- Order: Myrtales
- Family: Combretaceae
- Genus: Terminalia
- Species: T. nitens

Binomial name
- Terminalia nitens Presl.

= Terminalia nitens =

Species of flowering plant

Terminalia nitens is a species of plant in the Combretaceae family. It is native to the Philippines and Japan (Bonin Islands). It is threatened by habitat loss.
