= Terminalia mantaly =

Conservation status
- Least Concern (IUCN 3.1)

Scientific classification
- Kingdom: Plantae
- Clade: Tracheophytes
- Clade: Angiosperms
- Clade: Eudicots
- Clade: Rosids
- Order: Myrtales
- Family: Combretaceae
- Genus: Terminalia
- Species: T. mantaly

Binomial name
- Terminalia mantaly H.Perrier

Species of flowering plant

Terminalia mantaly, known as the Madagascar almond or umbrella tree, is a species of plant in the family Combretaceae first described in 1953 by Joseph Marie Henry Alfred Perrier de la Bâthie, native to shrubland and forest in Madagascar from sea level to 500 m, and has been introduced to Comoros, Mauritius, Gambia, Guinea, India, Sumatra, Taiwan, and southern China. It is a fast-growing tree with smooth mottled gray bark and a layered canopy to about 20 m (66 ft) tall, with a fleshy drupe as fruit, and is used as an ornamental tree along streets and parks in subtropical and tropical locations. The cultivar 'Tricolor' is grown for its leaves irregularly edged in cream, which are pinkish-red when young.
