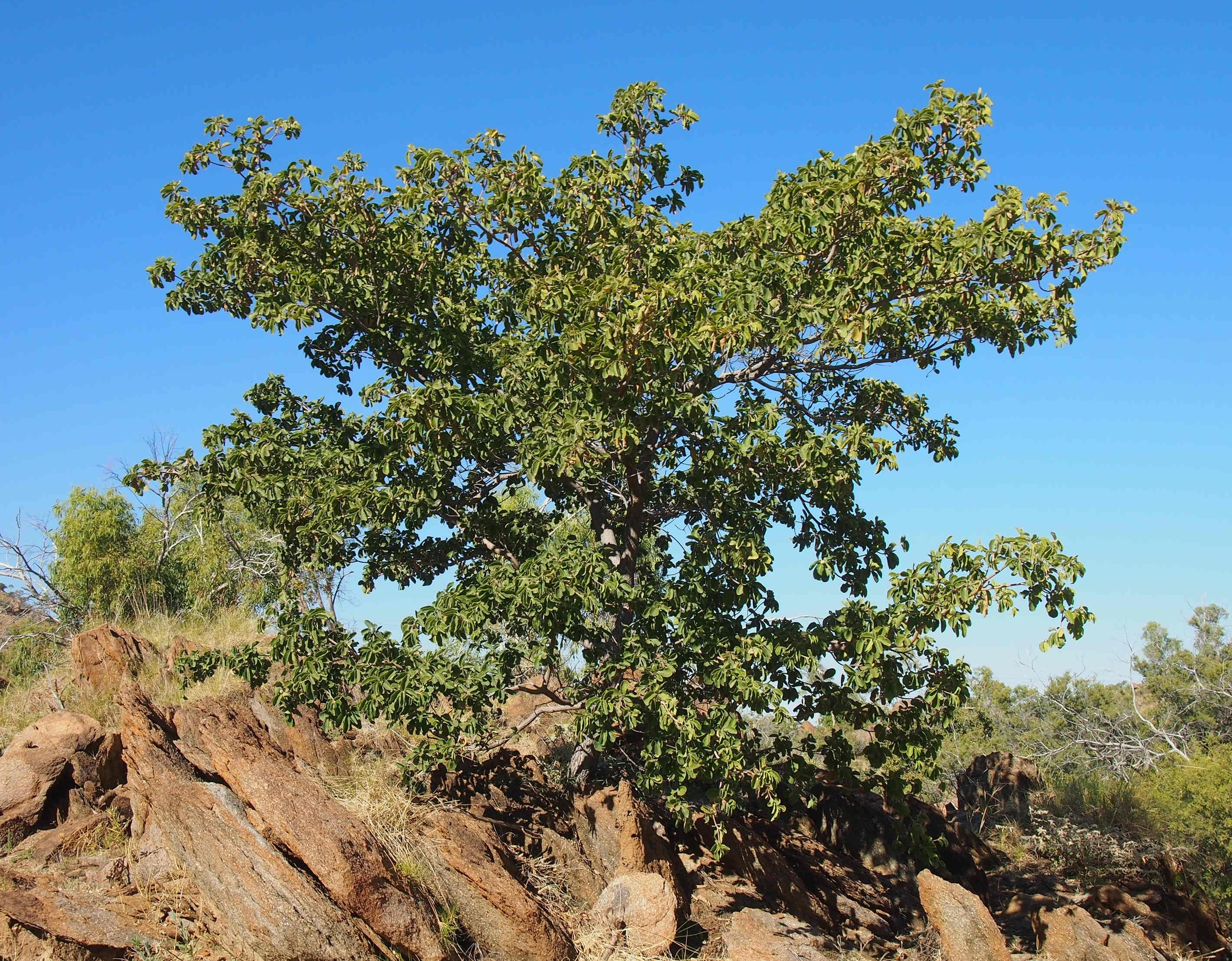
- Terminalia hadleyana subsp. carpentariae

Scientific classification
- Kingdom: Plantae
- Clade: Embryophytes
- Clade: Tracheophytes
- Clade: Spermatophytes
- Clade: Angiosperms
- Clade: Eudicots
- Clade: Rosids
- Order: Myrtales
- Family: Combretaceae
- Genus: Terminalia
- Species: T. hadleyana

Binomial name
- Terminalia hadleyana W.Fitzg.

= Terminalia hadleyana =

Species of tree

Terminalia hadleyana is a tree of the family Combretaceae native to northern Australia.

The tree or shrub typically grows to a height of 2 to 10 metres (7 to 33 ft) but can reach up to 15 metres (49 ft) and is deciduous. It blooms between October and December producing cream-yellow flowers.

== Subspecies ==
Subspecies include:

- Terminalia hadleyana subsp. carpentariae (C.T.White) Pedley — wild peach
- Terminalia hadleyana subsp. hadleyana

The range of T. h. subsp. hadleyana extends through the top end of the Northern Territory to the south eastern extremity of the Gulf of Carpentaria in Queensland and is often part of open woodland communities. In Western Australia it is confined to rocky outcrops and on floodplains in the Kimberley growing in sandy-clay soils over sandstone or limestone.

The edible fruits of T. h. subsp. carpentariae are harvested in the wild. The species was formally described as Terminalia carpentariae in 1950 by botanist Cyril Tenison White. The type specimen was collected in the Crocodile Islands in the Northern Territory. This subspecies is native to northern Australia, occurring on sandy soils and coastal dunes.
