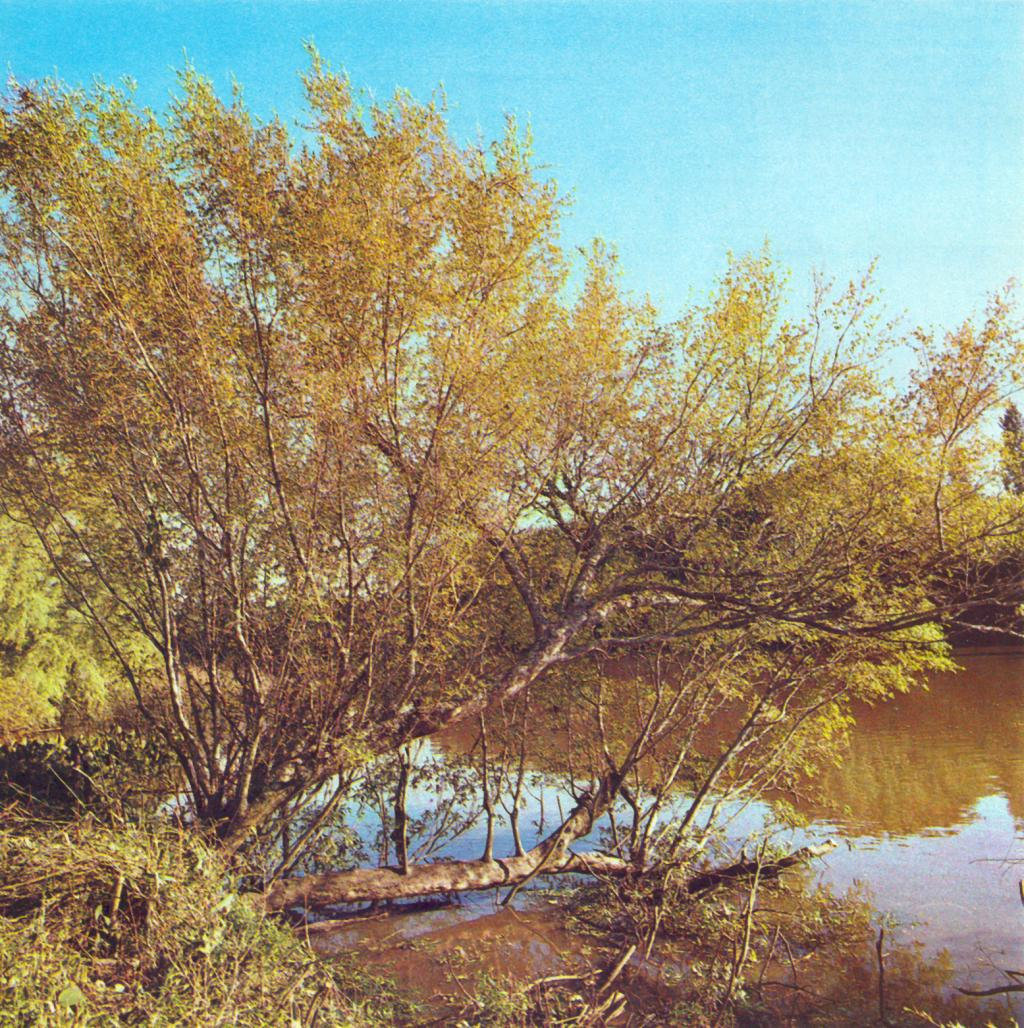

Scientific classification
- Kingdom: Plantae
- Clade: Tracheophytes
- Clade: Angiosperms
- Clade: Eudicots
- Clade: Rosids
- Order: Myrtales
- Family: Combretaceae
- Genus: Terminalia
- Species: T. australis

Binomial name
- Terminalia australis Cambess.

= Terminalia australis =

Species of tree

Terminalia australis is a South American species of large shrub or tree, which reaches up to 12 m in height and 40 cm in diameter. It inhabits the basins of the Paraná River and the Uruguay River around the Argentine Mesopotamia, Paraguay and Uruguay, and part of the Río de la Plata.

The common names of this tree, in Spanish, include the adjective amarillo ("yellow") due to the yellow-ochre colour of its wood: amarillo, palo amarillo, amarillo del río, etc.

This species is found in the gallery forest along the shores of large rivers in the north-east of Argentina and the neighbouring countries. Its wood is finely textured, homogeneous, and moderately heavy (relative density = 0.65). It is used for ornamental and precision works, such as chess pieces, rulers, buttons, etc.
