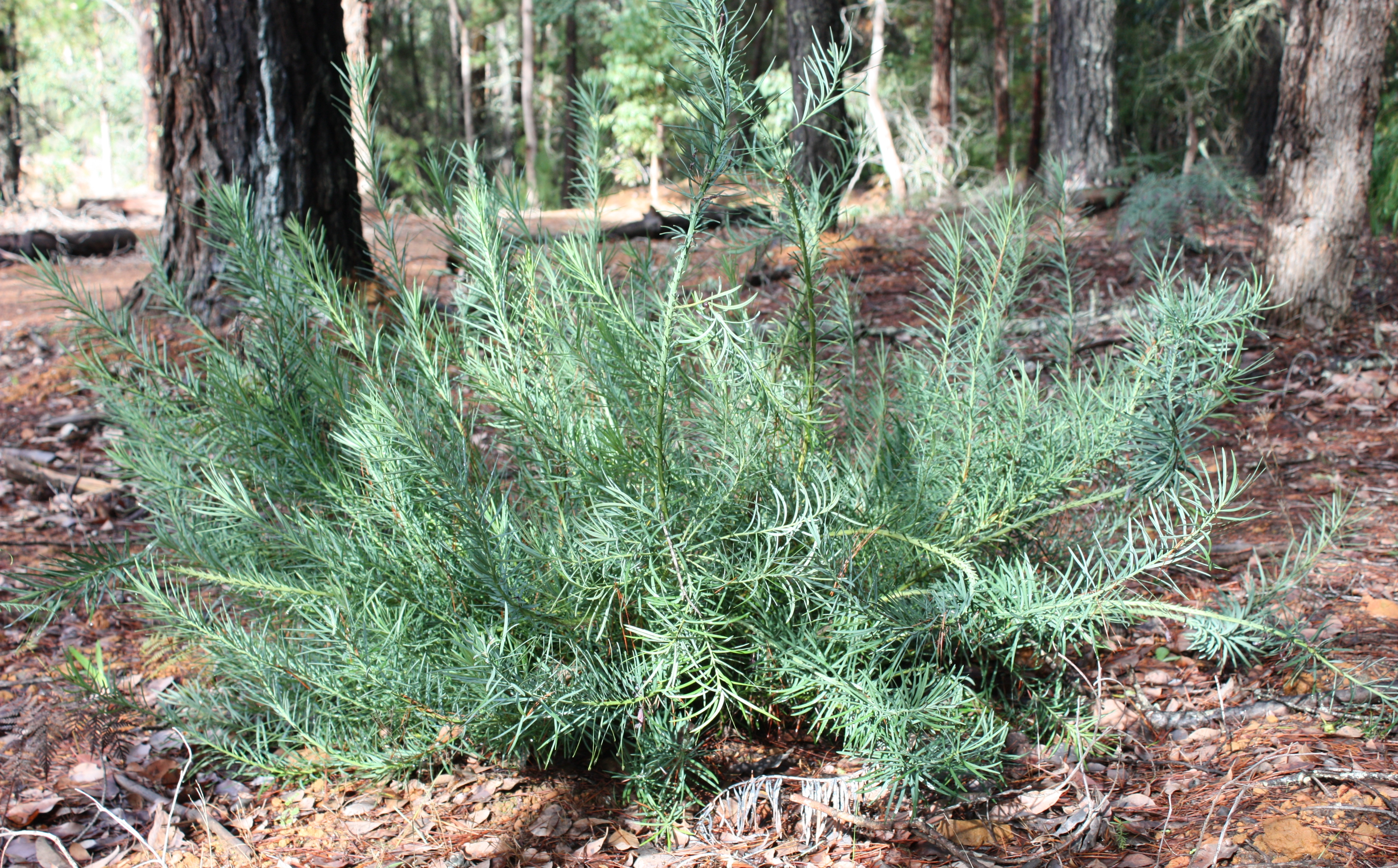

Conservation status
- Least Concern (IUCN 3.1)

Scientific classification
- Kingdom: Plantae
- Clade: Tracheophytes
- Clade: Gymnosperms
- Division: Pinophyta
- Class: Pinopsida
- Order: Araucariales
- Family: Podocarpaceae
- Genus: Podocarpus
- Species: P. drouynianus

Binomial name
- Podocarpus drouynianus F.Muell.

= Podocarpus drouynianus =

Species of conifer

Podocarpus drouynianus, the emu berry, wild plum or native plum, is a species of conifer in the family Podocarpaceae. It is native to the relatively high rainfall southwestern corner of Western Australia. The Noongar name for the plant is koolah.

== Description ==
The plant is usually a shrub, not often forming a single trunk, instead growing multiple branches from around the base. It looks like a conifer, typically grows to a height of 0.75 to 3 metres (2 to 10 ft) and forms clumps a few metres wide. It is dioecious and very slow-growing. The bark is thin and fibrous, green in colour turning red-brown on the outside. The leaves are needle-like, 4 to 8 centimetres (1.6 to 3.1 in) long, sharply pointed, green above and with glaucous stomatal bands beneath. The cones are berry-like, with a fleshy, edible purple aril 2 to 2.5 cm (0.79 to 0.98 in) long and one (rarely two) apical seeds 1 cm (0.39 in)1 cm long.

== Distribution ==
It grows on lower slopes and low-lying areas and around creeks in the South West and Great Southern regions of Western Australia where it grows in loamy, sandy or gravelly soils. It is associated as part of the understorey species present in lowland jarrah and karri and it spreads mostly by root suckering. The extent of occurrence of the species is less than 20,000 square kilometres (7,722 sq mi) over multiple locations. The total area of occupancy by P. drouynianus has reduced as a result of clearing of forest for pasture and the replacement of native forest with exotics.

== Cultivation ==
Ideally Podocarpus drouynianus should be grown in partial shade with plenty of water. Unusually for the genus, it tolerates quite dry conditions. It survives temperatures of up to 45 °C, and grows well in full sun or partial shade.

The plant grows as a rounded form in cultivation, slowly attaining two metres in height and 1.5 metres in width. Propagation from cuttings in the usual method of planting. The presentation of its red and fleshy fruit is unreliable, but the plant is favoured for its appealing foliage. The long and leafy stems are harvested for use in the florist industry. The plum-like fruit is edible, although lacking any distinctive taste, and noted as an important food of the first peoples of Southwest Australia.

== Classification ==
The species was initially described by the botanist Ferdinand von Mueller in 1864 in his work Fragmenta Phytographiae Australiae. There are two synonyms for this species: Nageia drouyniana and Podocarpus drouyniana. The species name honors the statesman Edouard Drouyn de Lhuys who was a member of the Institut de France.
