= Terminalia schimperiana =

Scientific classification
- Kingdom: Plantae
- Clade: Tracheophytes
- Clade: Angiosperms
- Clade: Eudicots
- Clade: Rosids
- Order: Myrtales
- Family: Combretaceae
- Genus: Terminalia
- Species: T. schimperiana

Binomial name
- Terminalia schimperiana Hochst.

Synonyms
- Myrobalanus glaucescens (Planch. ex Benth.) Kuntze; Myrobalanus salicifolia (Schweinf.) Kuntze; Terminalia baumannii Engl. & Diels; Terminalia excelsior A.Chev.; Terminalia flava Engl.; Terminalia glaucescens Planch. ex Benth.; Terminalia longipes Engl.; Terminalia passargei Engl.; Terminalia salacifolia Schweinf.; Terminalia togoensis Engl. & Diels; Terminalia velutina Rolfe

Species of tree

Terminalia schimperiana is a species of flowering plant in the family Combretaceae. It is native to tropical Africa from Guinea and Sierra Leone east to Uganda and Ethiopia.

== Growth ==
It is a broadleaved small tree that can reach up to 7–14 m, variably deciduous in the dry season to semi-evergreen, depending on the climate. The leaves are alternate, simple, elliptic to obovate, entire, 9–15 cm long and 3–8 cm broad, green above with pale undersides. The flowers are tiny and form pale spikes at the base of the leaves. The fruit is a samara with a single wing 6–9 cm long, that turns brown with age.

== Characteristics ==
It can be found in open forest habitats with more than 1300 mm of rainfall per year. as well as closed forest. When it is found in closed forest, it typically is part of the forest canopy. It may be the dominant large tree species where it is found. Fire and debarking by elephants can damage the trees.

== Medicinal uses ==
In parts of West Africa, T. schimperiana is used as a medicinal plant. The bark is applied to wounds, and the twigs may be chewed to promote oral hygiene. In laboratory experiments, extracts of the plant were found to have in vitro antibiotic properties against Staphylococcus. The plant extracts also have antifungal properties in vitro.
