= Terminalia ivorensis =

Conservation status
- Vulnerable (IUCN 2.3)

Scientific classification
- Kingdom: Plantae
- Clade: Tracheophytes
- Clade: Angiosperms
- Clade: Eudicots
- Clade: Rosids
- Order: Myrtales
- Family: Combretaceae
- Genus: Terminalia
- Species: T. ivorensis

Binomial name
- Terminalia ivorensis A.Chev.

Species of tree

Terminalia ivorensis is a species of tree in the family Combretaceae, and is known by the common names of Ivory Coast almond, idigbo, black afara, framire and emeri.

== Description ==
Terminalia ivorensis is found in Cameroon, Ivory Coast, Ghana, Guinea, Liberia, Nigeria, and Sierra Leone. It is listed as vulnerable on the IUCN Red List and is threatened by habitat loss.

The wood has a density of about 560 kg per cubic metre. The wood is a pale yellow-brown in colour, seasons well with little movement in service, but is generally of low strength.

== Uses ==
The durable heartwood is used as timber in joinery and high-class furniture.
