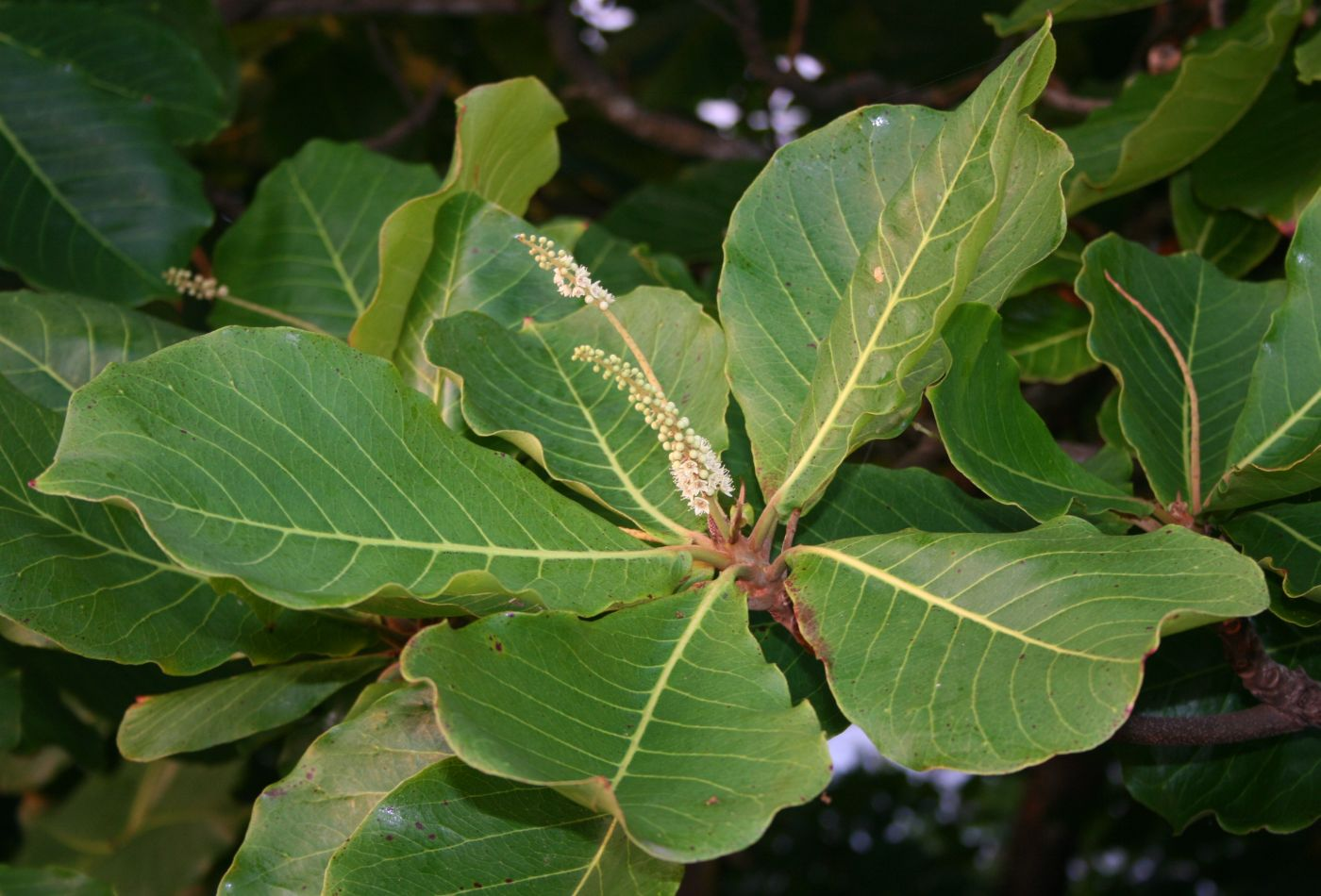
- Terminalia catappa

Scientific classification
- Kingdom: Plantae
- Clade: Tracheophytes
- Clade: Angiosperms
- Clade: Eudicots
- Clade: Rosids
- Order: Myrtales
- Family: Combretaceae
- Genus: Terminalia; L.

Synonyms
- 26 synonyms: Adamaram Adans.; Anogeissus (DC.) Guill.; Badamia Gaertn.; Buceras P.Browne; Buchenavia Eichler; Bucida L.; Catappa Gaertn.; Chicharronia A.Rich.; Chuncoa Pav. ex Juss.; Fatrea Juss.; Finetia Gagnep.; Gimbernatea Ruiz & Pav.; Hudsonia A.Rob. ex Lunan, nom. illeg.; Kniphofia Scop., nom. rej.; Myrobalanifera Houtt.; Myrobalanus Gaertn.; Pamea Aubl.; Panel Adans.; Pentaptera Roxb.; Pteleopsis Engl.; Ramatuela Kunth; Ramatuella Kunth, orth. var.; Resinaria Comm. ex Lam., not validly publ.; Tanibouca Aubl.; Terminaliopsis Danguy; Vicentia Allemão

= Terminalia (plant) =

Genus of flowering plants

Terminalia is a genus of large trees of the flowering plant family Combretaceae, comprising nearly 300 species distributed in tropical regions of the world. The genus name derives from the Latin word terminus, referring to the fact that the leaves appear at the very tips of the shoots.

Axlewood (T. latifolia) is used for its wood and tannins and as a fodder. African birch (T. leiocarpa) is used for its wood and to make yellow dye and medicinal compounds. A yellow dyestuff produced from the leaves of T. leiocarpa has traditionally been used in West Africa to dye leather. Madagascar almond (T. mantaly) is used as an ornamental tree in subtropical and tropical locations.

== Selected species ==
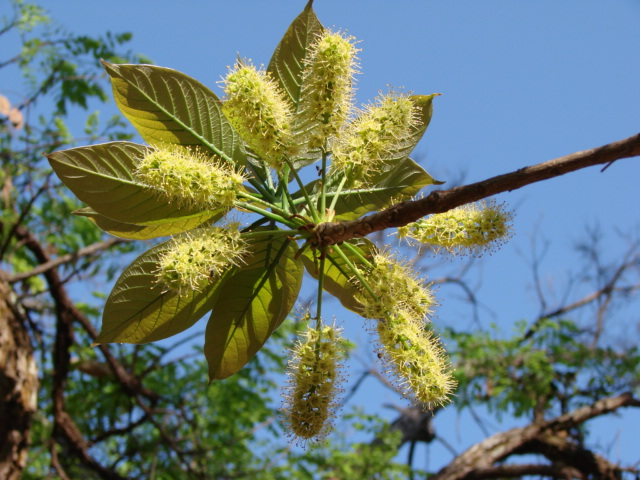
Terminalia argentea flowers

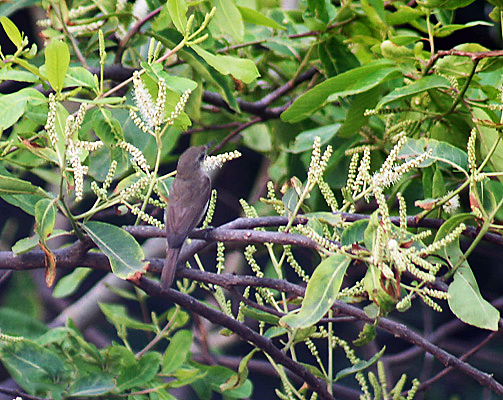
Terminalia arjuna flowers

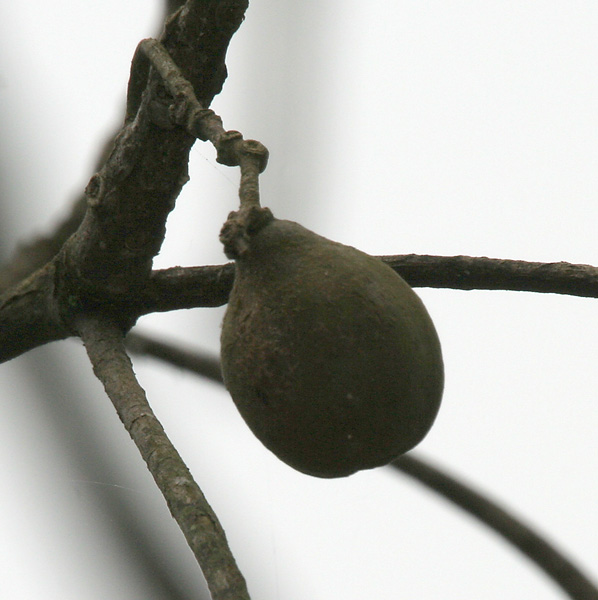
Terminalia bellirica fruit

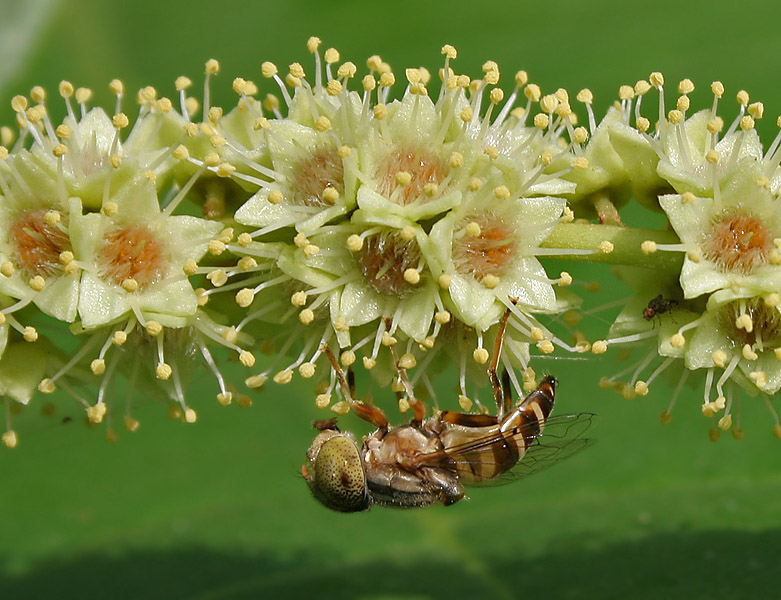
Terminalia catappa flowers with a hoverfly - a close up

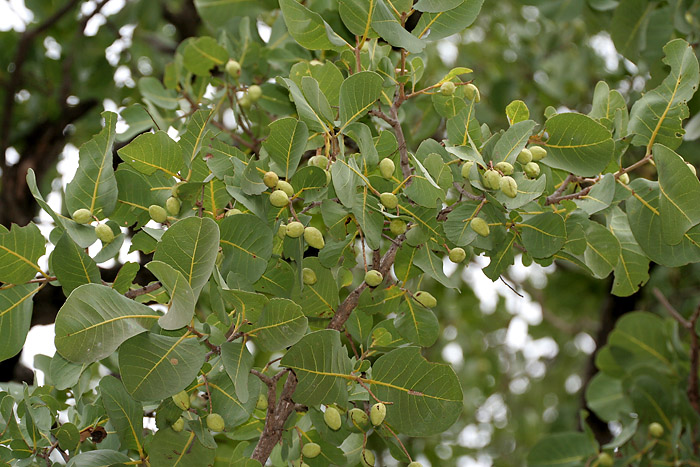
Terminalia pallida in Talakona forest, Chittoor District, Andhra Pradesh, India

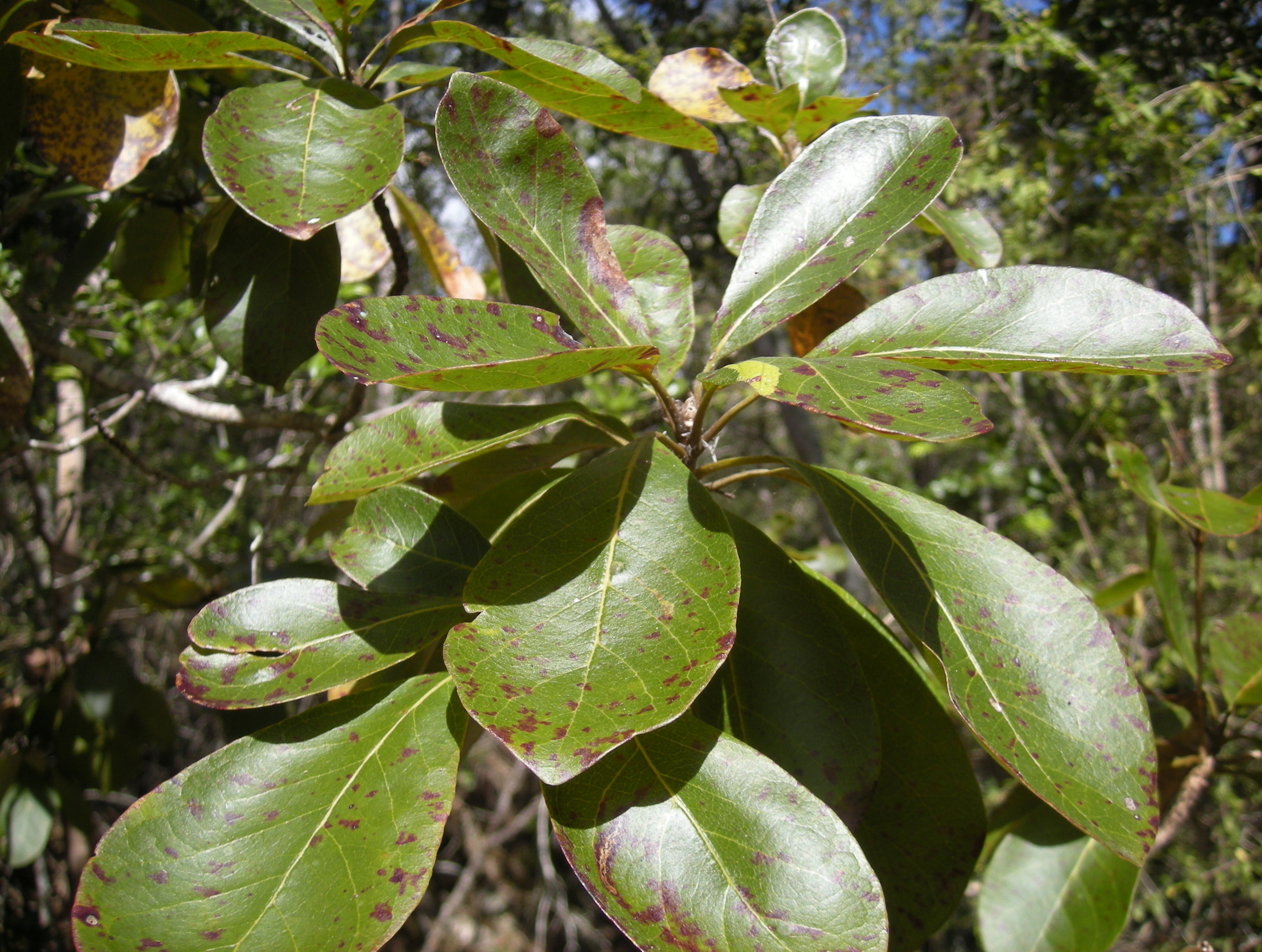
Terminalia porphyrocarpa foliage and flowers

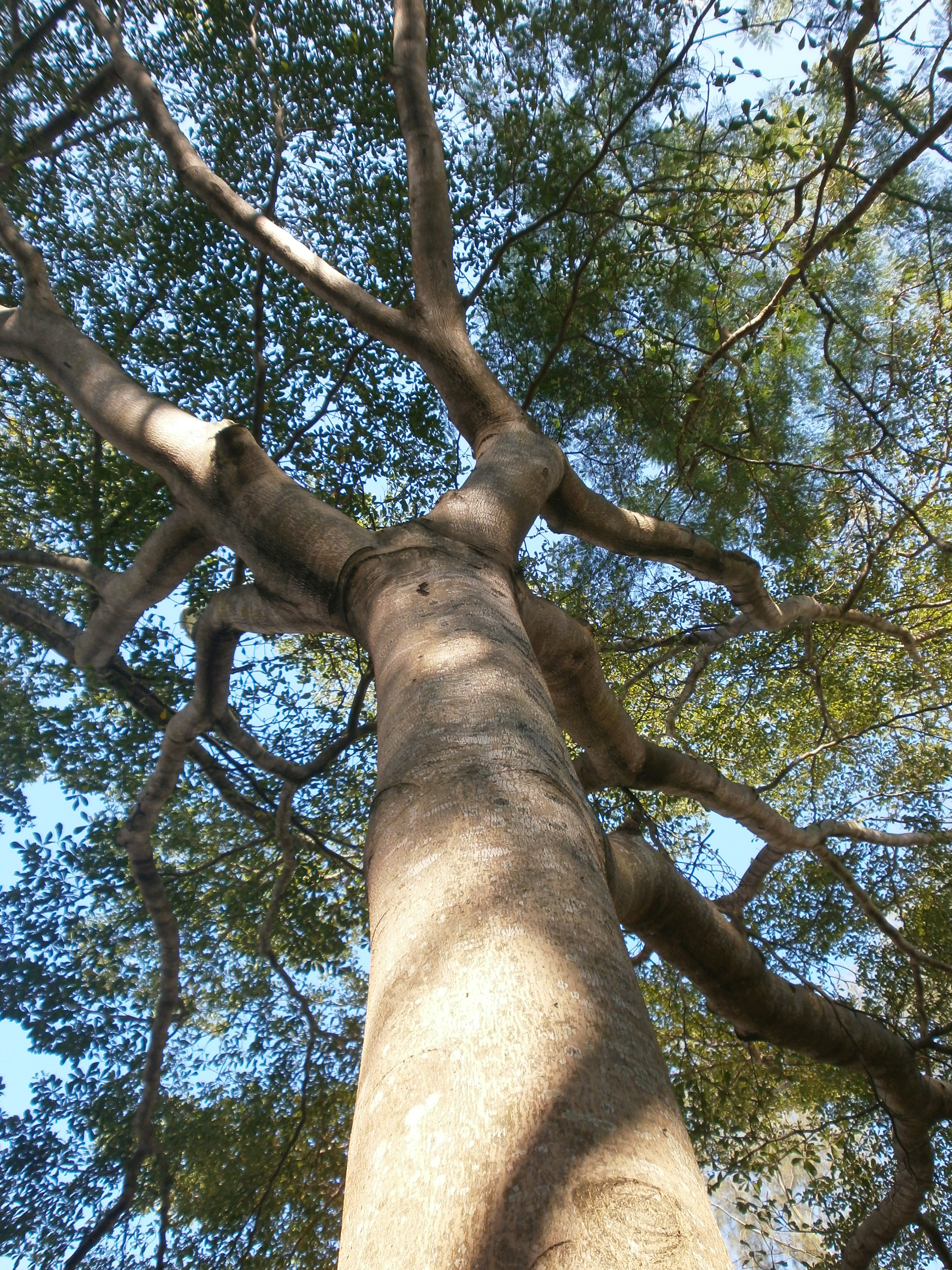
Terminalia mantaly street tree in Hong Kong

There are 278 accepted Terminalia species as of July 2024 according to Plants of the World Online. Selected species include:

- Terminalia acuminata (Fr. Allem.) Eichl.
- Terminalia albida Scott-Elliot
- Terminalia amazonia (J.F.Gmel.) Exell – white olive
- Terminalia anogeissiana Gere & Boatwr. – axlewood
- Terminalia arbuscula Sw.
- Terminalia archipelagi Coode
- Terminalia arenicola Byrnes
- Terminalia arjuna (Roxb. ex DC.) Wight & Arn. – arjuna, koha, white marudah
- Terminalia arostrata Ewart & O.B.Davies – crocodile tree
- Terminalia australis Cambess – palo amarillo, tanimbú
- Terminalia avicennioides Guill. & Perr.
- Terminalia bellirica (Gaertn.) Roxb. – beleric
- Terminalia bentii (Baker) Gere & Boatwr.
- Terminalia bialata (Roxb.) Steud. – Indochina, Philippines
- Terminalia buceras (L.) C.Wright
- Terminalia bucidoides Standley & L.O.Williams
- Terminalia bursarina – Bendee
- Terminalia calamansanai (Blanco) Rolfe
- Terminalia cambodiana Gagnep.
- Terminalia canescens (DC.) Radlk. – jalool
- Terminalia carolinensis Kaneh.
- Terminalia catappa L. – Indian almond, tropical almond, umbrella tree
- Terminalia chebula Retz. – black myrobalan, chebulic myrobalan, inknut
- Terminalia cherrieri McKee
- Terminalia circumalata F.Muell.
- Terminalia cunninghamii C.A.Gardner – Pindan quondong
- Terminalia dhofarica (A.J.Scott) Gere & Boatwr.
- Terminalia eddowesii Coode
- Terminalia engleri Gere & Boatwr. – terenifù (West Africa to Cameroon)
- Terminalia elliptica Willd. – Indian-laurel
- Terminalia eriostachya A.Rich.
- Terminalia ferdinandiana Exell – billygoat plum, Kakadu plum, gubinge
- Terminalia fitzgeraldii C.A.Gardner
- Terminalia glabrata G.Forst.
- Terminalia grandiflora Benth.
- Terminalia hadleyana W.Fitzg.
- Terminalia ivorensis A.Chev. – idigbo, black afara, blackbark, brimstone wood, shingle wood
- Terminalia januariensis DC.
- Terminalia kaernbachii Warb. – okari nut
- Terminalia kangeanensis Slooten – Kangean almond
- Terminalia kuhlmannii Alwan & Stace
- Terminalia kumpaja R.L.Barrett
- Terminalia latifolia Sw.
- Terminalia latipes Benth.
- Terminalia leiocarpa (DC.) Baill.
- Terminalia littoralis L.
- Terminalia macroptera Guill. & Perr.
- Terminalia mantaly H.Perrier. – Madagascar almond, umbrella tree
- Terminalia megalocarpa Exell
- Terminalia microcarpa Decne.
- Terminalia muelleri Benth. – Australian almond
- Terminalia myriocarpa Van Heurck & Müll.Arg.
- Terminalia neotaliala Capuron
- Terminalia nitens C.Presl; sakat (in Philippines)
- Terminalia novocaledonica Däniker
- Terminalia oblongata F.Muell.
- Terminalia paniculata Roth
- Terminalia parviflora Thwaites
- Terminalia pellucida C.Presl
- Terminalia pendula (Edgew.) Gere & Boatwr. (incorporating T. phillyreifolia)
- Terminalia petiolaris Benth. – marool
- Terminalia platyphylla F.Muell.
- Terminalia platyptera F.Muell.
- Terminalia polycarpa Engl. & Diels
- Terminalia porphyrocarpa F.Muell. ex Benth.
- Terminalia prunioides M.A.Lawson
- Terminalia reitzii Excell
- Terminalia rerei Coode
- Terminalia richii A.Gray
- Terminalia rostrata Fosberg & Falanruw
- Terminalia schimperiana Hochst.
- Terminalia sericea Burch. ex DC. – silver terminalia
- Terminalia superba Engl. & Diels – limba
- Terminalia triptera Stapf. (syn. T. nigrovenulosa Pierre)
- Terminalia volucris Benth.
