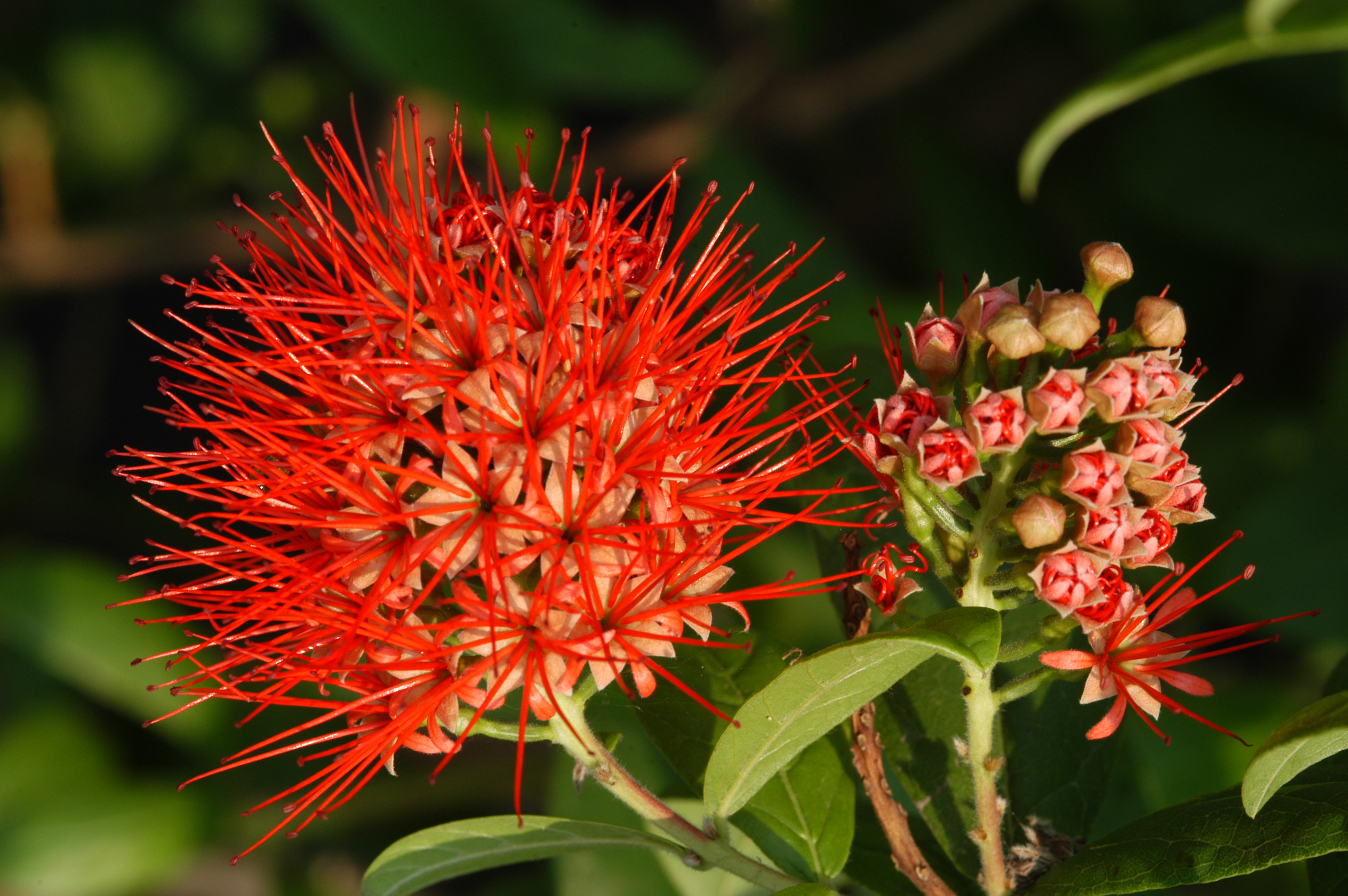
- Combretum constrictum inflorescence

Scientific classification
- Kingdom: Plantae
- Clade: Tracheophytes
- Clade: Angiosperms
- Clade: Eudicots
- Clade: Rosids
- Order: Myrtales
- Family: Combretaceae; R.Br.

Type genus
- Combretum Loefl.

Genera
- see text.

Synonyms
- Bucidaceae Spreng.; Myrobalanaceae Martinov; Strephonemataceae Venkat. & Prak.Rao; Terminaliaceae J.St.-Hil.

= Combretaceae =

Combretaceae Temporal range: Turonian - recent

Family of flowering plants

The Combretaceae, often called the white mangrove family, are a family of flowering plants in the order Myrtales. The family includes about 530 species of trees, shrubs, and lianas in 10 genera. The family includes the leadwood tree, Combretum imberbe. Three genera, Conocarpus, Laguncularia, and Lumnitzera, grow in mangrove habitats (mangals). The Combretaceae are widespread in the subtropics and tropics. Some members of this family produce useful construction timber, such as idigbo from Terminalia ivorensis. The commonly cultivated Quisqualis indica (as well as the entire former genus Quisqualis) is now placed in the genus Combretum. Many plants in the former Quisqualis genus contain quisqualic acid, a potent nerve toxin.

== Taxonomy ==
The family name comes from the type genus Combretum; it also includes the white mangrove, Laguncularia racemosa, found along seacoasts in tropical America and West Africa.

== Genera ==
Plants of the World Online currently includes:

- Combretum Loefl. (synonyms include Meiostemon Exell & Stace, Quisqualis L., and Thiloa Eichler)
- Conocarpus L.
- Dansiea Byrnes
- Getonia Roxb. (synonym Calycopteris)
- Guiera Adans. ex Juss.
- Laguncularia C.F.Gaertn. (monotypic)
- Lumnitzera Willd.
- Macropteranthes F.Muell.
- Strephonema Hook.f.
- Terminalia L. (synonyms include Anogeissus, Buchenavia, Bucida, Pteleopsis, and Terminaliopsis)
