= Ironwood =

Ironwood is a common name for some woods that have a very high hardness, or specifically a density that is greater than that of water (approximately 1000 kg/m^{3}, or >62 pounds per cubic foot).

They come from tree or shrub species whose wood is characterized for its exceptionally high hardness, dry density, and resistance to mechanical wear. Generally, such woods sink into the water rather than float. As a name, ironwood is not a single botanical species, genus, or a family. In addition, this naming is frequently used in the commercially-related terminology in the timber trade.

These unrelated hardwoods originate mostly from the subtropical and tropical regions, and their physical properties make them useful for few applications, requiring very high wear resistance and hardness. Most of the ironwoods are very well suited for woodturning on a lathe. However, their high density and interlocking grain can make sawing, machining, drying, and fastening much more difficult than those of less dense woods.

A list of ironwood species is included below:

== List ==
- Acacia aulacocarpa (Brush ironwood)
- Acacia estrophiolata (Southern ironwood), central Australia
- Acacia excelsa (Ironwood)
- Acacia melanoxylon (Ironwood)
- Acacia stenophylla (Ironwood), Australia
- Aegiphila martinicensis (Ironwood)
- Afzelia africana (Ironwood)
- Androstachys johnsonii (Lebombo ironwood), southeastern Africa and Madagascar
- Allagoptera caudescens, Borassus flabellifer, Caryota urens, Iriartea deltoidea Black Palm, Palmira wood (Black ironwood)
- Argania spinosa (Morocco ironwood, Thorny, Prickly ironwood)
- Astronium fraxinifolium, Astronium urundeuva (Ironwood)
- Backhousia bancroftii (Bancroft's ironwood)
- Backhousia citriodora (Lemon ironwood), northeastern Australia
- Backhousia myrtifolia (Carrol ironwood, Ironwood)
- (Backhousia subargentea Syn.: Choricarpia subargentea) (Giant ironwood), eastern Australia
- Bridelia micrantha (Benin or Yoruba ironwood), Bridelia atroviridis (Yoruba ironwood)
- Carpinus caroliniana American hornbeam (Ironwood, Blue-beech ironwood, Smooth-barked ironwood), eastern North America
- Casuarinaceae, she-oaks in general, Southeast Asia (Australian ironwood)
  - Allocasuarina spp.; Allocasuarina luehmannii, Allocasuarina torulosa, Allocasuarina inophloia (Ironwood), Allocasuarina verticillata (Long-leaved, Longleaf ironwood, Highland or Mountain ironwood)
  - Casuarina cunninghamiana (Small-cone ironwood, Australian coast ironwood, River-oak ironwood)
  - Casuarina equisetifolia Toa (Beach, Coast ironwood, Pacific, Sea, South Sea or Polynesian ironwood or Short-leaf and False ironwood, Lowland Ironwood), native from Burma south to Australia
  - Casuarina cristata (Ironwood)
  - Casuarina glauca (Long-leaf Ironwood, Saltmarsh Ironwood, Blue ironwood)
  - Casuarina stricta (Highland ironwood, Fodder ironwood)
  - Casuarina junghuhniana (Mountain Ironwood)
- (Cenostigma pluviosum Syn.: Caesalpinia pluviosa) (Bolivian ironwood)
- Cercocarpus spp. (Ironwood), Cercocarpus betuloides (Mountain ironwood)
- Chionanthus battiscombei (Water pock ironwood, Small-fruited ironwood, Water Ornate-leaf(ved) ironwood)
- Chionanthus caymanensis (Ironwood, Cayman ironwood)
- Chioanthus compactus (White ironwood)
- Chionanthus panamensis, Chionanthus ligustrinus (Pine ridge ironwood)
- Chionanthus peglerae (Bastard black ironwood or Giant pock ironwood and Pegler's bastard ironwood, Large-leaved ironwood)
- (Citharexylum flexuosum Syn.: Citharexylum spinosum) (White ironwood)
- Cliftonia monophylla (Ironwood)
- Coccoloba pubescens (Broad-leaved ironwood)
- Colophospermum mopane (Black ironwood, Rhodesian ironwood)
- Colubrina elliptica (Ironwood, Martinique ironwood), Colubrina arborescens (West Indian ironwood)
- Combretum imberbe (Ironwood)
- Cordia subcordata (Ironwood)
- Cossinia pinnata (Judas ironwood)
- Cryptocarya lauriflora (Borneo ironwood), Cryptocarya ferrea (Java ironwood)
- Cyrtophyllum fragrans (Ironwood)
- Cynometra alexandri (Uganda ironwood), central and east Africa
- Cyrilla racemiflora (Ironwood, Swamp ironwood)
- Dalbergia melanoxylon (African ironwood)
- Dialium guianense (Ironwood)
- Diploglottis australis Syn.: Diploglottis cunninghamii) (Australian, New Holland ironwood)
- Distylium racemosum (Japanese ironwood)
- Drypetes gerrardii (Bastard white ironwood, Forest ironwood)
- Erythrophleum chlorostachys Steelwood (Cooktown ironwood, Red or Northern ironwood, Leguminous ironwood, Poisonous ironwood), native to northern Australia
- Erythroxylum areolatum (Cartagena ironwood, Jamaica ironwood)
- Eucalyptus spp. (Australian ironwood)
- Eugenia confusa (Red berry ironwood, Tropical ironwood)
- Eusideroxylon zwageri (Borneo ironwood, Chinese ironwood, Real or True ironwood), southeast Asia
- Exostema caribaeum (Bastard ironwood)
- Exothea paniculata (Ironwood)
- Fagraea fragrans (Sumatra or Java ironwood)
- Fagara lentiscifolia (Bastard ironwood)
- Forestiera pubescens (Ironwood)
- Forestiera pubescens var. parvifolia (New Mexican ironwood)
- Genipa americana (Brazilian ironwood)
- Gordonia haematoxylon (Ironwood)
- Gossia bidwillii (Smooth-barked ironwood, Scrub ironwood), Gossia acmenoides (Scrub ironwood), Gossia dulcis (Ironwood), Gossia floribunda (Cape ironwood), Gossia myrsinocarpa (Malanada ironwood)
- Gymnanthes lucida (Narrow-leaf ironwood)
- (Gymnostoma nodiflorum Syn.: Casuarina nodiflora ) (Knot-flowered ironwood)
- (Gymnostoma papuanum Syn.: Casuarina papuana) (Papuan ironwood)
- (Gymnostoma sumatranum Syn.: Casuarina sumatrana) (Ironwood)
- Handroanthus spp. formerly Tabebuia spp.; Handroanthus heptaphyllus, Handroanthus serratifolius etc., Ipê, Brazilian walnut, Lapacho, Yellow poui (Ironwood)
- Heritiera trifoliolata Black stavewood, Heritiera actinophylla Stavewood (Ironwood)
- Holodiscus discolor Oceanspray (Ironwood), western North America
- Homalium dentatum, Homalium letestui (Brown ironwood), Homalium rufescens (Small-leaved brown ironwood), Homalium abdessammadii (Zambezi brown ironwood)
- Hopea odorata, Hopea parviflora (Malabar, Ceylon ironwood)
- Hypelate trifoliata (White ironwood)
- Ilex mitis (Lance-leaved ironwood, Smooth or Mild, Unarmed ironwood)
- Inhambanella henriquesii (Rock, Water or Small ironwood)
- Intsia bijuga, Intsia palembanica (Moluccan, Madagascar ironwood)
- Ixora ferrea (Ironwood, West Indian ironwood, Martinique ironwood, Red ironwood, Three-flowered ironwood)
- Jacquinia keyensis (Ironwood)
- Krugiodendron ferreum (Black ironwood, Caribbean or Guadeloupe ironwood), Caribbean
- (Libidibia ferrea Syn.: Caesalpinia ferrea) (Brazilian ironwood), Brazil
- Lignum vitae; Guaiacum officinale, Guaiacum sanctum and Argentine, Paraguay Lignum Vitae, Verawood Bulnesia arborea also als Maracaibo Lignum Vitae and Bulnesia sarmientoi (Ironwood)
- Lophira alata (West African ironwood, (Small) Red ironwood, Dwarf (red) ironwood, Dryzone (red) ironwood), western and central Africa
- Lophira lanceolata ((Dwarf) Red ironwood)
- Lyonothamnus floribundus (Catalina or Western ironwood, Island or Santa Cruz (Island) Ironwood, Lyon's Ironwood or Fern-leaved ironwood), in the rose family, Channel Islands of California
- Manilkara hexandra (Ceylon ironwood)
- Manilkara kauki (Moluccan ironwood)
- Mesua ferrea (Sri Lankan or Ceylon and Assam ironwood, East Indian Ironwood), southern and southeastern Asia
- Metrosideros spp. all Species (Ironwood), Metrosideros umbellata (New Zealand Ironwood), Metrosideros kermadecensis (Real or True ironwood)
- Millettia grandis (Kafir ironwood)
- Minquartia guianensis (Ironwood)
- Mouriri myrtilloides (Small-leaved ironwood)
- Myoporum obscurum (Bastard ironwood)
- Myracrodruon urundeuva (Ironwood)
- Nestegis apetala (Bastard ironwood), New Zealand and Norfolk Island
- Notelaea ligustrina (Tasmanian ironwood, New-South-Wales ironwood)
- Notelaea longifolia (Norfolk-Island ironwood)
- (Noronhia foveolata Syn.: Chionanthus foveolatus) (Pock ironwood, Bastard ironwood or Cape pock ironwood, Bastard, Forest pock ironwood, Ornate-leaf(ved), Fine-leaved ironwood) native to southern Africa
- Ochna holstii (Red ironwood)
- Oldfieldia africana (West African ironwood)
- Olea capensis (Bastard Black, Forest, Bushveld or False, Bastard ironwood, South African ironwood, Small and Olive ironwood, East African ironwood), Africa
- Olea woodiana (Black ironwood), eastern and southern Africa
- Olinia ventosa (Sproutful ironwood)
- Olneya tesota (desert ironwood, Arizona or Sonora ironwood, Mexican ironwood)
- Ostrya knowltonii Knowlton's or Western hophornbeam (Canyon ironwood, Western Ironwood)
- Ostrya virginiana Hophornbeam, (North-American, American ironwood, Canadian ironwood, Rough-barked ironwood, Eastern ironwood)
- Palicourea cardiomorpha subsp. cardiomorpha (Panicled-flowered ironwood)
- Parrotia persica (Persian ironwood, Transcaucasian ironwood)
- Parrotia subaequalis (Chinese ironwood)
- Paubrasilia echinata (Ironwood)
- Peltophorum rufum (Cochinchina ironwood)
- Pemphis acidula (Maldivian ironwood)
- Picrodendron baccatum (Black ironwood)
- Planchonella costata (Bastard ironwood)
- Planchonella obovata (Silvery ironwood, Obovate ironwood)
- Prosopis juliflora, Prosopis glandulosa (Texas ironwood), Prosopis kuntzei, Prosopis africana (Ironwood) Mesquite
- Prunus africana (Ironwood)
- Quebracho Schinopsis spp.; Schinopsis brasiliensis, Schinopsis balansae, Schinopsis lorentzii and Aspidosperma quebracho-blanco (Ironwood)
- Rapanea melanophloeos (Laurel-leaved ironwood)
- Rauvolfia sandwicensis (Hawaiian ironwood)
- Reynosia septentrionalis, Reynosa latifolia (Red ironwood)
- Rhodamnia acuminata (Cooloola ironwood)
- Rhodomyrtus trineura var. canescens (Crater ironwood), Rhodomyrtus pervagata (Rusty ironwood)
- Rothmannia capensis (Black ironwood, Cape of Good Hope ironwood)
- Schleichera oleosa (Ironwood)
- Senegalia intsia (Indian ironwood)
- Senegalia muricata (Ironwood)
- Senegalia tenuifolia (Antillean ironwood)
- Senna siamea (Indonesian or Indian ironwood)
- Sideroxylon spp. (Ironwood);
  - Sideroxylon inerme (Smooth or White ironwood, Broad-leaved, Unarmed ironwood, Cape or East African ironwood)
  - Sideroxylon lanuginosum or Gum bully (Ironwood)
  - Sideroxylon lycioides (American ironwood, Canada thorny ironwood, Willow-leaved, Boxthorn-leaved ironwood, Ten-threaded, Decandrous ironwood, Bumelia ironwood)
  - Sideroxylon tenax (Silky(-leaved) ironwood, Silvery-leaved ironwood)
  - Sideroxylon celastrinum (Ironwood)
  - Sideroxylon cinereum (White ironwood, Bourbon or Mauritius ironwood)
  - Sideroxylon foetidissimum (Opposite-leaved ironwood)
  - Sideroxylon lanuginosum (Woolly-leaved ironwood)
  - Sideroxylon reclinatum (Reclined ironwood)
- Sloanea dentata (Black ironwood, Broad-leaf ironwood)
- Sloanea jamaicensis, Sloanea sinemariensis (Ironwood)
- Stadmania spp. (Ironwood, Bois de fer, Mauritius ironwood), Stadmania oppositifolia (Bourbon ironwood)
- Swartzia spp.; Swartzia tomentosa (Cayenne ironwood), Swartzia bannia, Swartzia bidentata, Swartzia leiocalycina, Swartzia ingifolia, Swartzia grandifolia, Swartzia panacoco (Guiana ironwood) etc. (Ironwood, South American ironwood, Suriname ironwood)
- Terminalia canescens (Ironwood)
- Tetragastris balsamifera (West Indian ironwood)
- Thouinia striata (Ironwood, Quebracho)
- Trichilia hirta (Bastard ironwood)
- Tristaniopsis laurina (Canungra ironwood)
- Vachellia farnesiana (Ironwood)
- Vepris lanceolata (White ironwood), Vepris reflexa (Woodland white ironwood, Bushveld white ironwood, Drooping or Rock white ironwood), Vepris undulata (White ironwood), Vepris carringtoniana (Coastal white ironwood, Wing-leaved white ironwood), Vepris zambesiaca (Rare white ironwood), Vepris termitaria (Riverine white ironwood) native to South Africa
- Xanthostemon species collectively known as "Philippine ironwood", all endemic to the Philippines
  - Xanthostemon bracteatus (Mapilig)
  - Xanthostemon fruticosus (Sierra Madre mangkono)
  - Xanthostemon philippinensis (Bagoadlau)
  - Xanthostemon verdugonianus (Mangkono)
  - Xanthostemon speciosus (Palawan mangkono)
  - Xanthostemon verus (Asian or Moluccan, Real or True ironwood)
- Xantolis tomentosa (Armed ironwood, Felty, Woolly, Downy-leaved ironwood)
- Xylia xylocarpa (Burma ironwood or Myanmar ironwood)
- Zanthoxylum fagara (Bastard, False ironwood, Yellow ironwood, Jamaica, Brazilian ironwood, Intended-leaved American ironwood)
- Zanthoxylum piperitum (Crenated-leaved ironwood)
- Zanthoxylum tragodes (Prickly-leaved American ironwood)
- Zapoteca tetragona (Antillean ironwood)

== Gallery ==
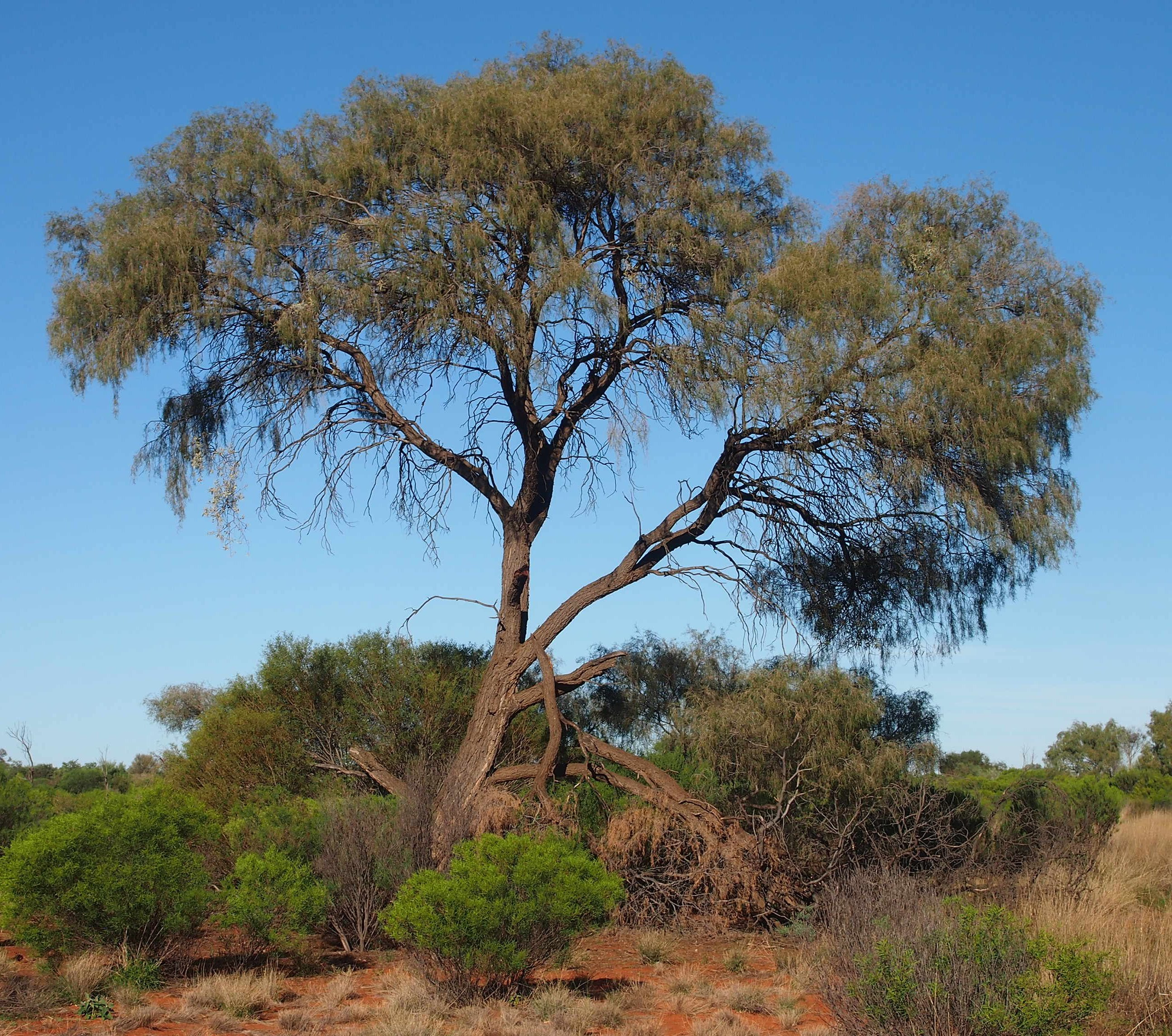
Acacia estrophiolata

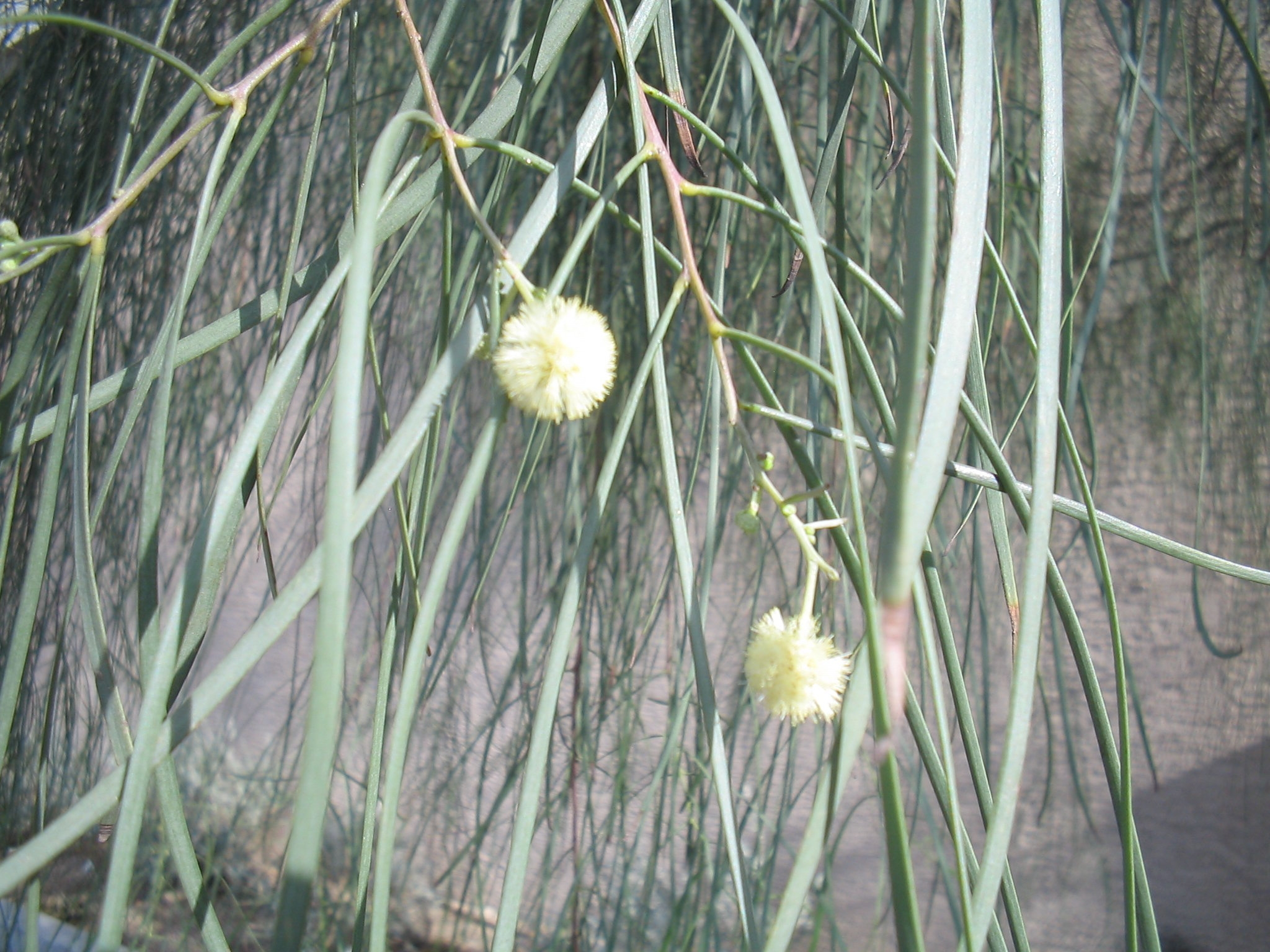
Acacia stenophylla flowers

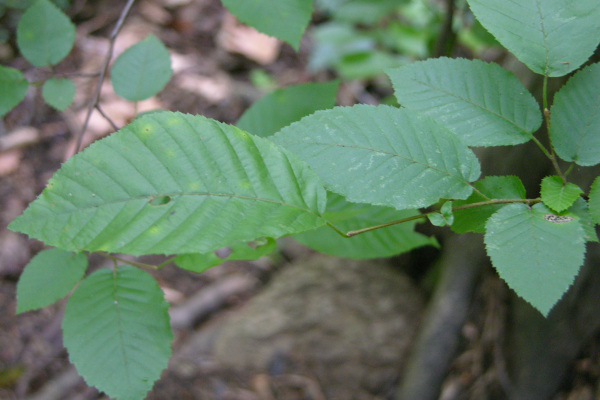
Carpinus caroliniana leaves

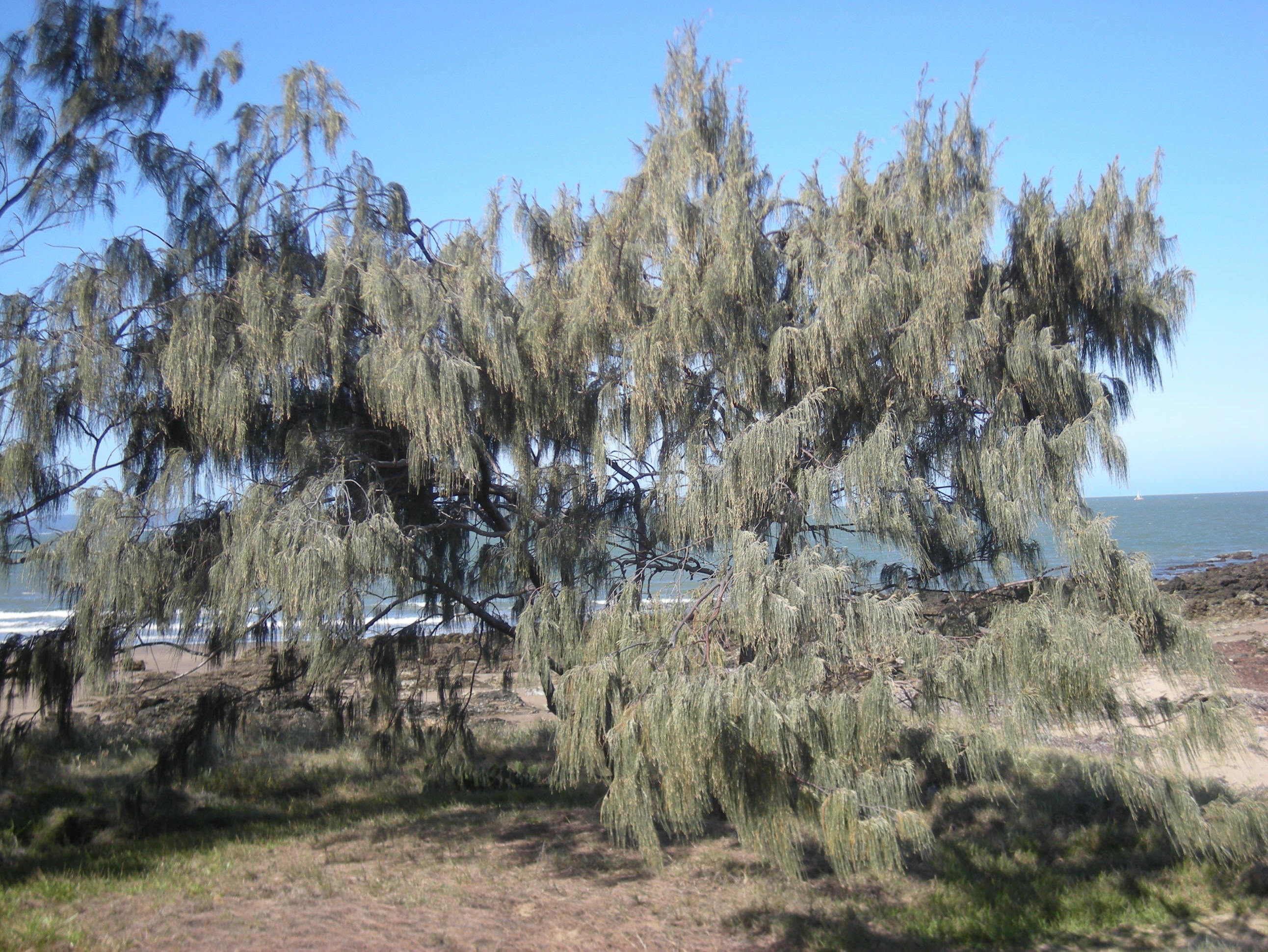
Casuarina equisetifolia subsp. incana

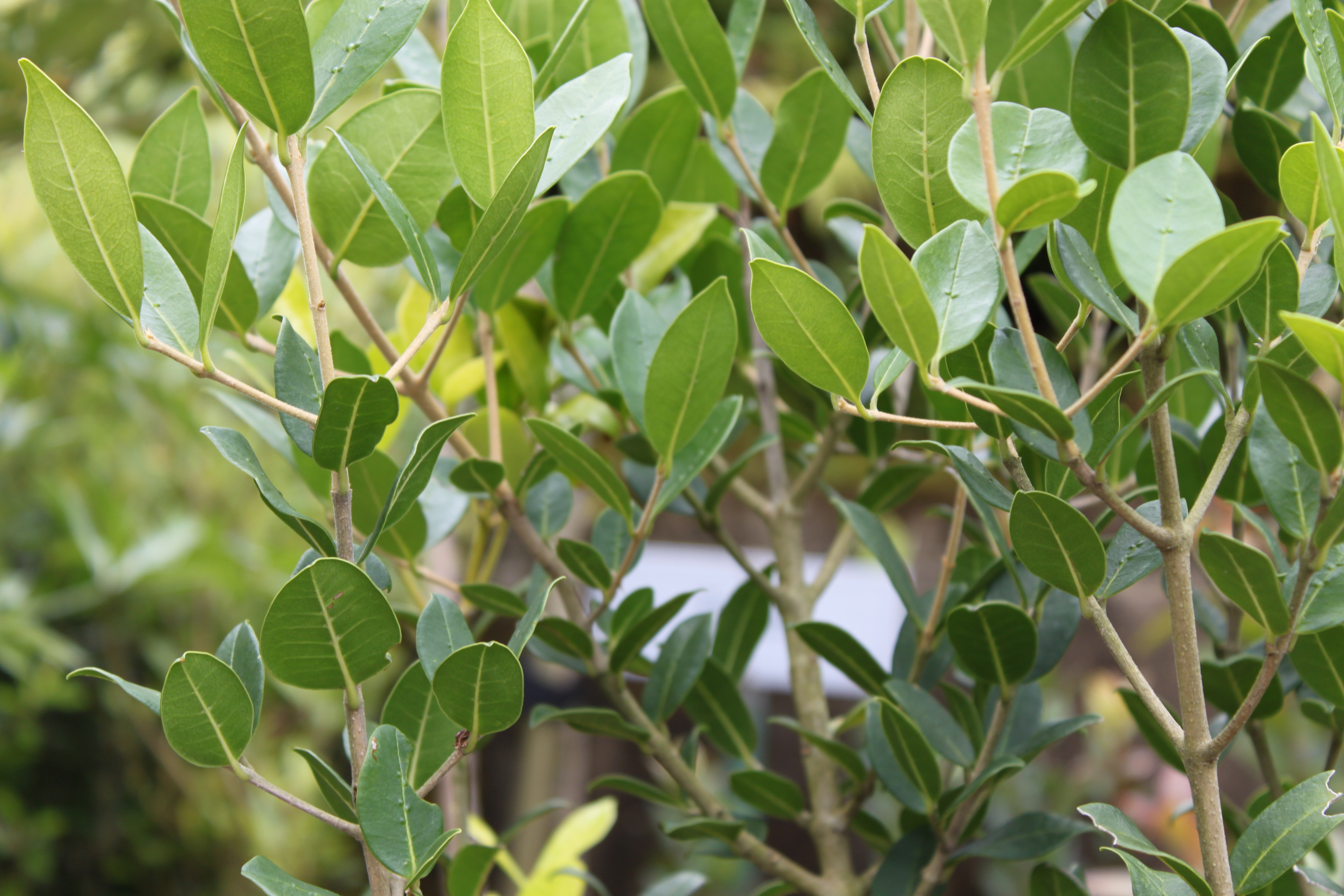
Chionanthus foveolatus leaves

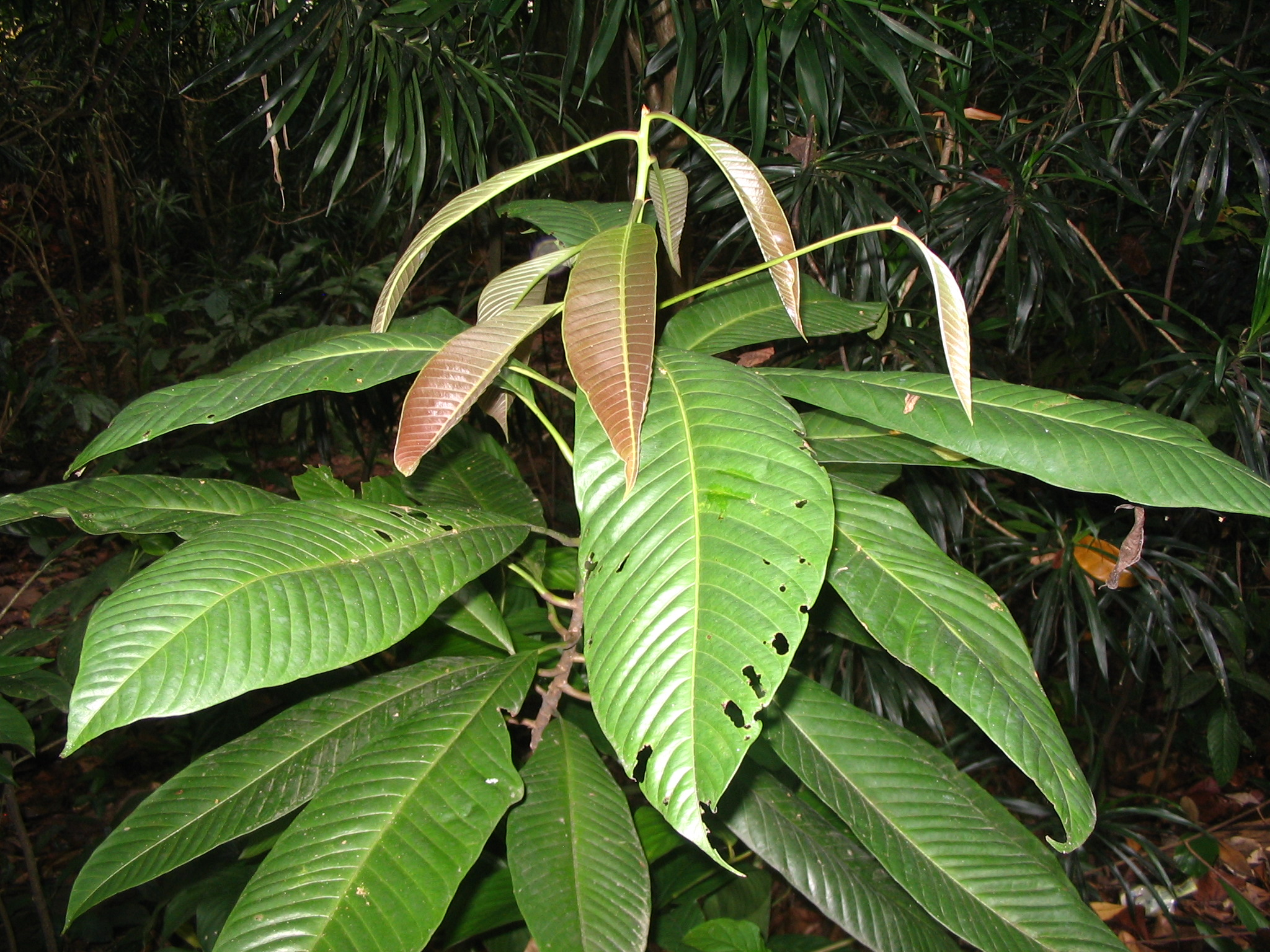
Eusideroxylon zwageri leaves

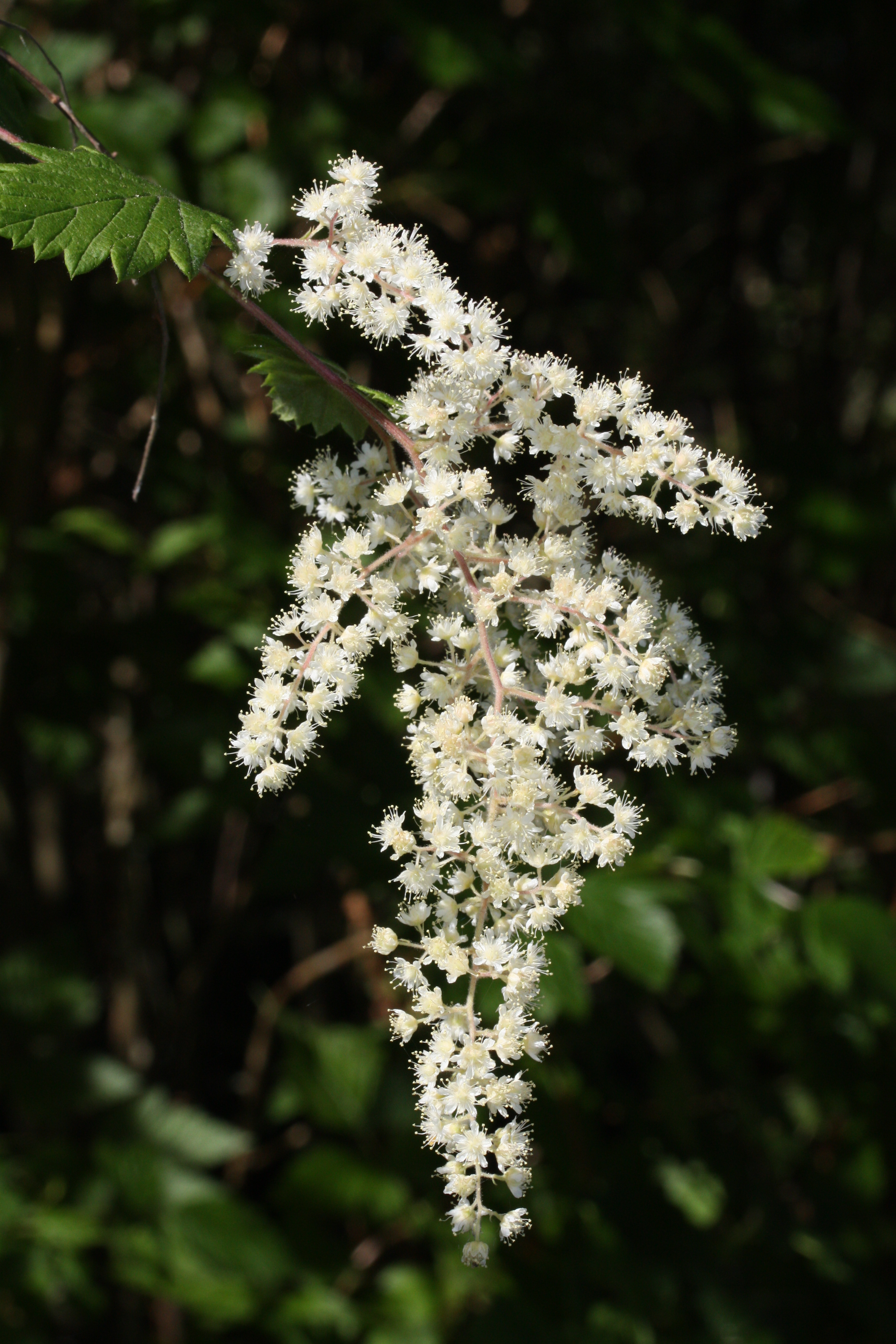
Holodiscus discolor flowers

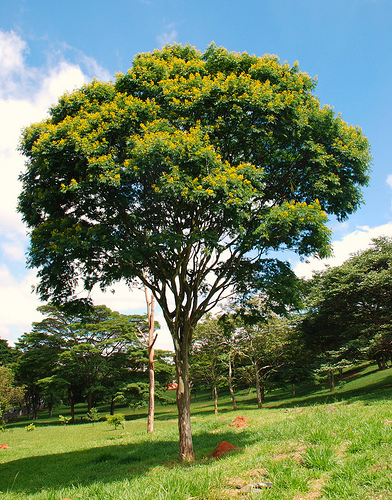
Libidibia ferrea

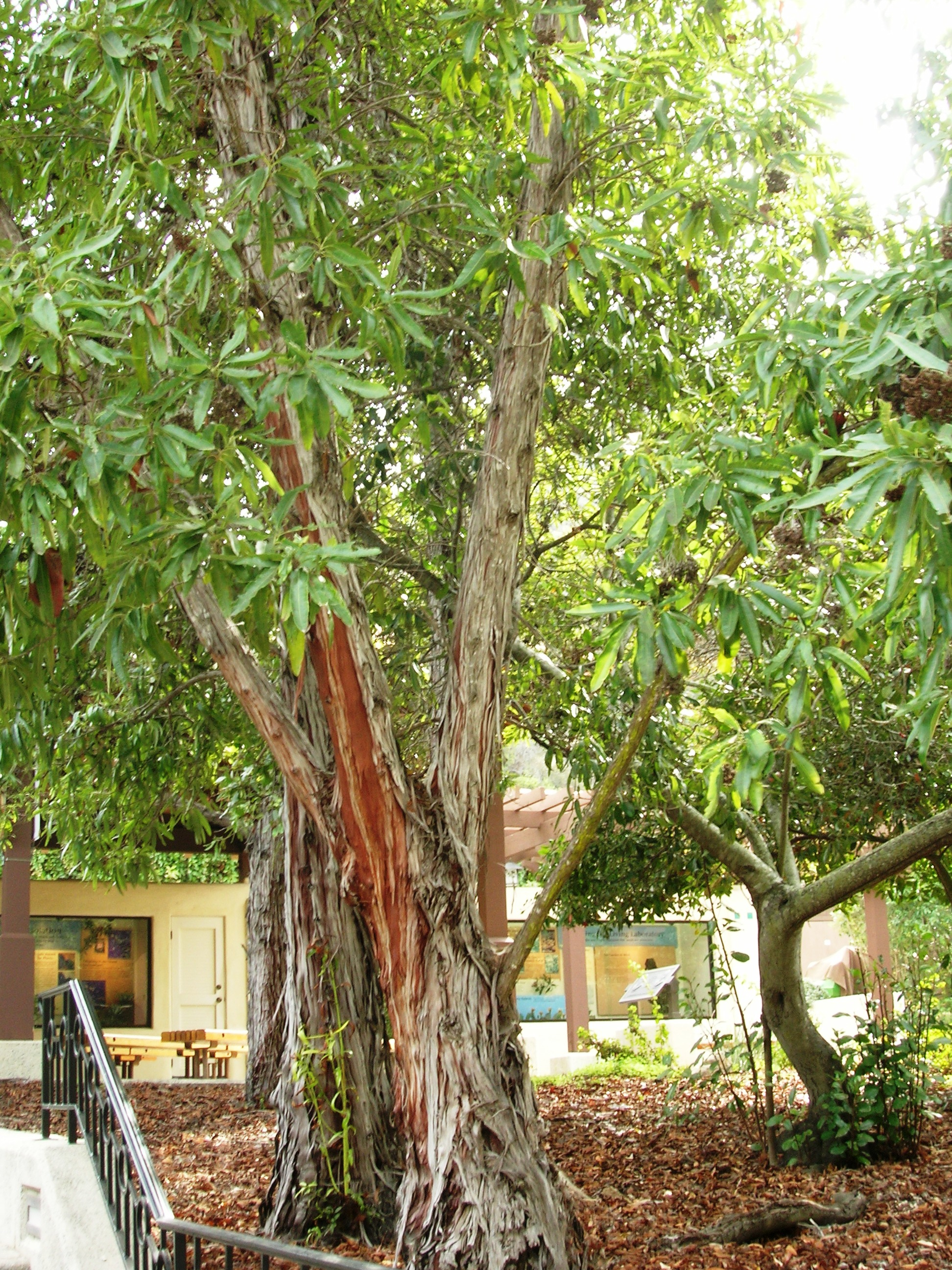
Lyonothamnus floribundus

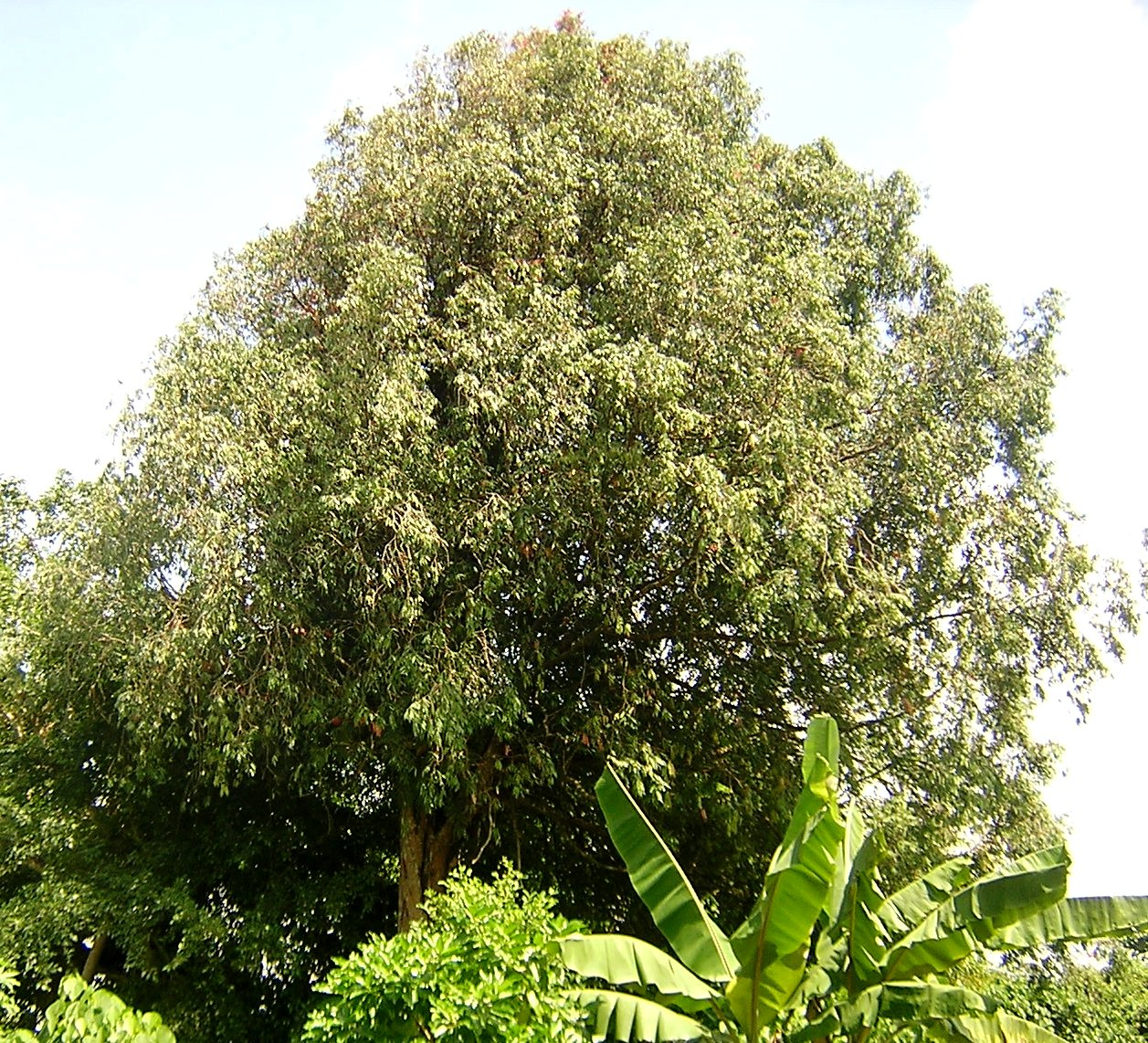
Mesua ferrea

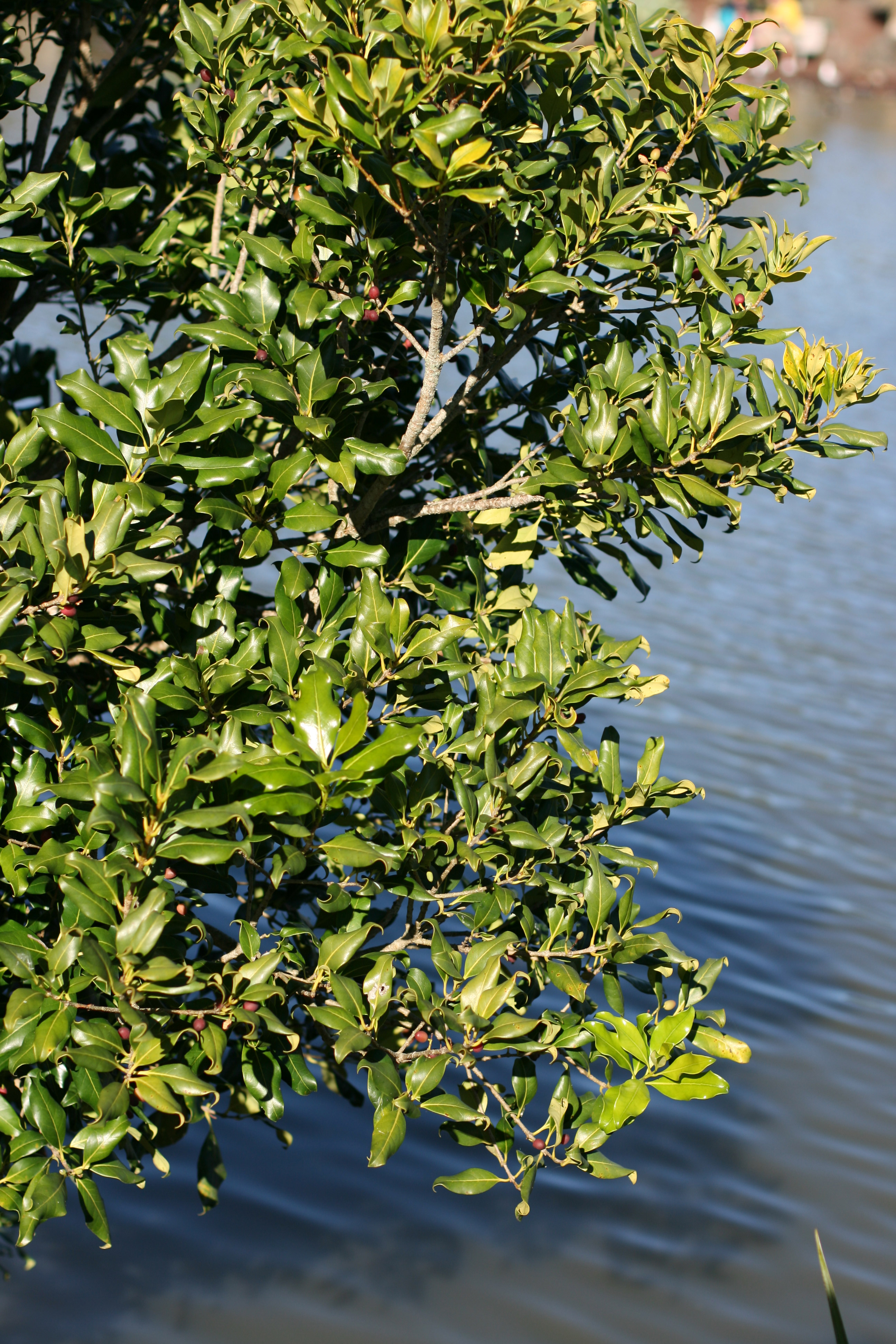
Nestegis apetala

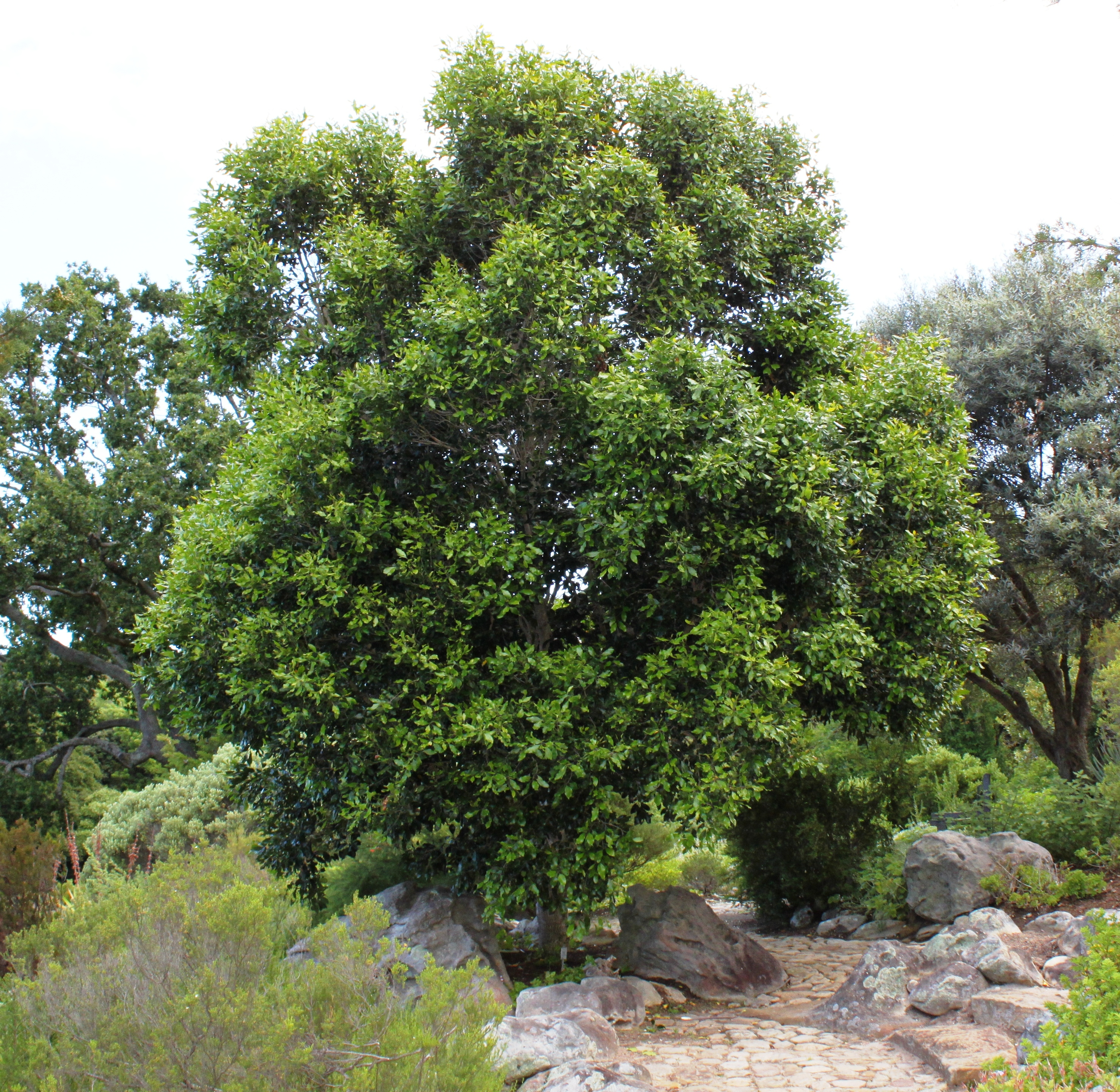
Olea capensis

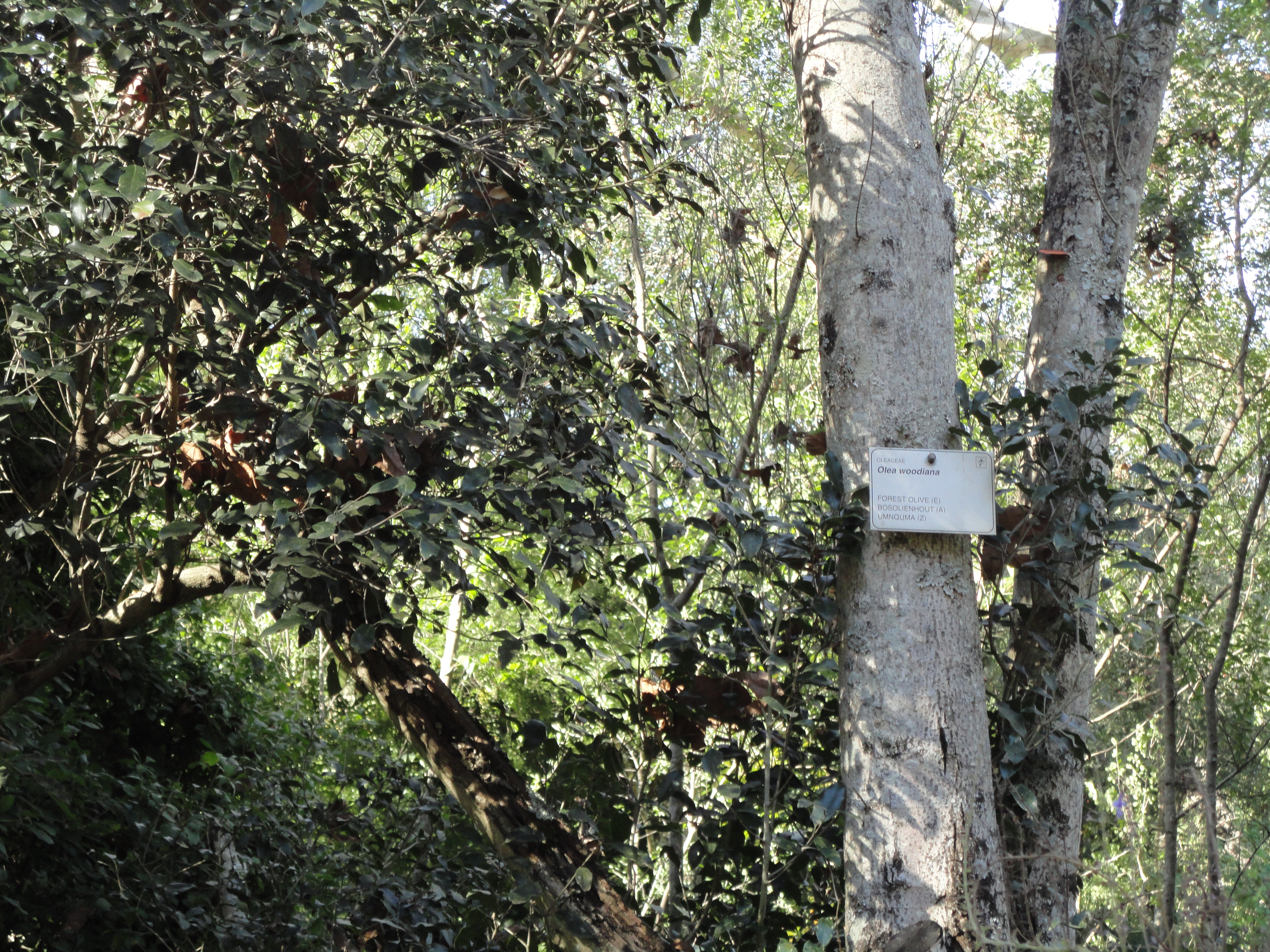
Olea woodiana

== See also ==
- Ironwood Island (Wisconsin)
- Ironwood, Michigan
- Ironwood State Prison
- Black ironwood (disambiguation)
- Ironbark, various Eucalyptus spp.
- Iron tree (disambiguation)
- Janka hardness test
- Sideroxylon, from sideros (σιδηρος) meaning "iron", and xylon (ξύλον) meaning "wood"
- Járnviðr
