= Black ironwood =

Black ironwood is a common name for several plants and may refer to:

- Allagoptera caudescens, Borassus flabellifer, Caryota urens, Iriartea deltoidea Black Palm, Palmira wood
- Colophospermum mopane
- Krugiodendron ferreum, a species of tree found in the Americas
- Olea capensis, a species of tree found in afromontane forests throughout Africa
- Olea woodiana
- Picrodendron baccatum
- Rothmannia capensis
- Sloanea dentata
