= Dichomeris condaliavorella =

Scientific classification
- Domain: Eukaryota
- Kingdom: Animalia
- Phylum: Arthropoda
- Class: Insecta
- Order: Lepidoptera
- Family: Gelechiidae
- Genus: Dichomeris
- Species: D. condaliavorella

Binomial name
- Dichomeris condaliavorella (Busck, 1900)

Synonyms
- Trichotaphe condaliavorella Busck, 1900

Species of moth

Dichomeris condaliavorella is a moth in the family Gelechiidae. It was described by August Busck in 1900. It is found in North America, where it has been recorded from Florida.

The wingspan is about 16 mm. The basal half of the costal edge of the forewings is brown, the remainder greenish grey, thickly suffused with dark fuscous scales. There are five indistinct dark fuscous spots on the disk, one on fold at one-fourth from the base, one above and one below the fold in the middle of the disk and one above and one below the fold at the end of the disk. The latter is smallest, but darker and more distinct. At the beginning of the costal cilia is a very indistinct, double, transverse, whitish V-shaped line and along the apical edge six or seven small black dots. The hindwings are dark bluish grey with silvery reflections, half transparent and with the veins darker.

The larvae feed on Krugiodendron ferreum. The larva at first stitches together any overlapping leaves of its food plant. Later, it folds over a leaf, and finally pupates in such a folded leaf. The mature larva has a reddish head and green body, with a reddish cervical shield and a green dorsal and subdorsal line.
