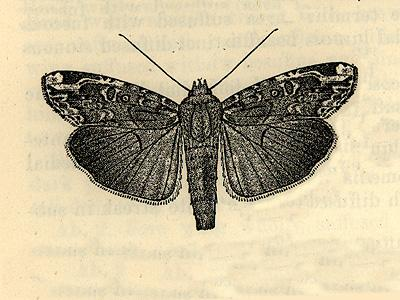

Scientific classification
- Kingdom: Animalia
- Phylum: Arthropoda
- Class: Insecta
- Order: Lepidoptera
- Superfamily: Noctuoidea
- Family: Noctuidae
- Genus: Magusa
- Species: M. orbifera

Binomial name
- Magusa orbifera (Walker, 1857)

Synonyms
- Xylina orbifera Walker, 1857; Magusa orbiferella Strand, 1916; Magusa orbiferana Strand, 1916; Magusa perversa Strand, 1916; Laphygma angustipennis Möschler, 1886

= Magusa orbifera =

Species of moth

Magusa orbifera is a moth of the family Noctuidae. It is found from southern Florida through the Florida Keys to the Caribbean. The species is commonly known as Orbed Narrow-wing, but this name may also be applied to Magusa divaricata, which was treated as a synonym until recently.

The species has a wingspan of approximately 34 mm, and adults are active throughout the year.

The larvae feed on Krugiodendron ferreum and Karwinskia humboldtiana.

== Taxonomy ==
Magusa divaricata was previously treated as a synonym of Magusa orbifera, but was recently reinstated as a valid species.
