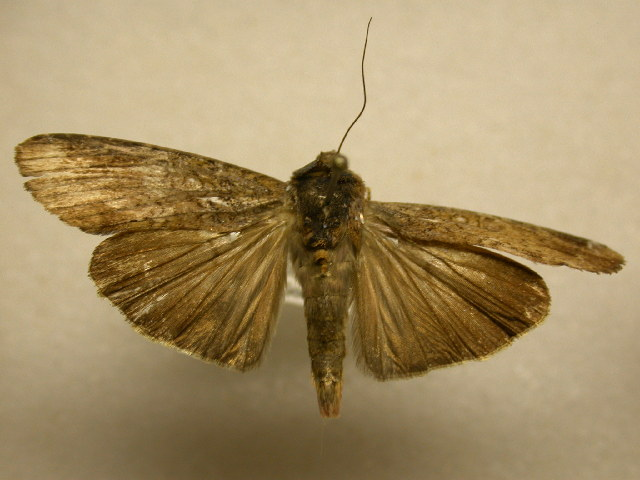

Scientific classification
- Kingdom: Animalia
- Phylum: Arthropoda
- Class: Insecta
- Order: Lepidoptera
- Superfamily: Noctuoidea
- Family: Noctuidae
- Genus: Magusa
- Species: M. divaricata

Binomial name
- Magusa divaricata (Grote, 1874)

Synonyms
- Stictoptera divaricata Grote, 1874; Magusa strigifera Walker, 1857; Magusa discidens Felder & Rogenhofer, 1874; Magusa dissidens; Magusa sarpida Felder & Rogenhofer, 1874

= Magusa divaricata =

Species of moth

Magusa divaricata, the orbed narrow-wing, is a moth of the family Noctuidae. The species was first described by Augustus Radcliffe Grote in 1874. It is found from eastern Canada south through the Caribbean and Central America to Paraguay and Argentina. It is a migratory species, which travels north in late summer and fall.

The wingspan is 40 mm.

== Taxonomy ==
Magusa divaricata was previously treated as a synonym of Magusa orbifera, but was recently reinstated as a valid species.
