= Callixena versicolora =

Scientific classification
- Kingdom: Animalia
- Phylum: Arthropoda
- Clade: Pancrustacea
- Class: Insecta
- Order: Lepidoptera
- Superfamily: Noctuoidea
- Family: Noctuidae
- Genus: Magusa
- Species: M. versicolora

Binomial name
- Magusa versicolora Saalmüller, 1891

Synonyms
- Magusa versicolora plagiata Berio, 1966; Magusa versicolora (Saalmüller, 1891)

Species of moth

Callixena versicolora is a moth of the family Noctuidae first described by Max Saalmüller in 1891. The species can be found in Africa, where it is known from Ghana, Nigeria, the Democratic Republic of the Congo, Malawi, Kenya, South Africa, Comoros, Madagascar and Réunion.

This species has a wingspan from 29 to 40 mm.
