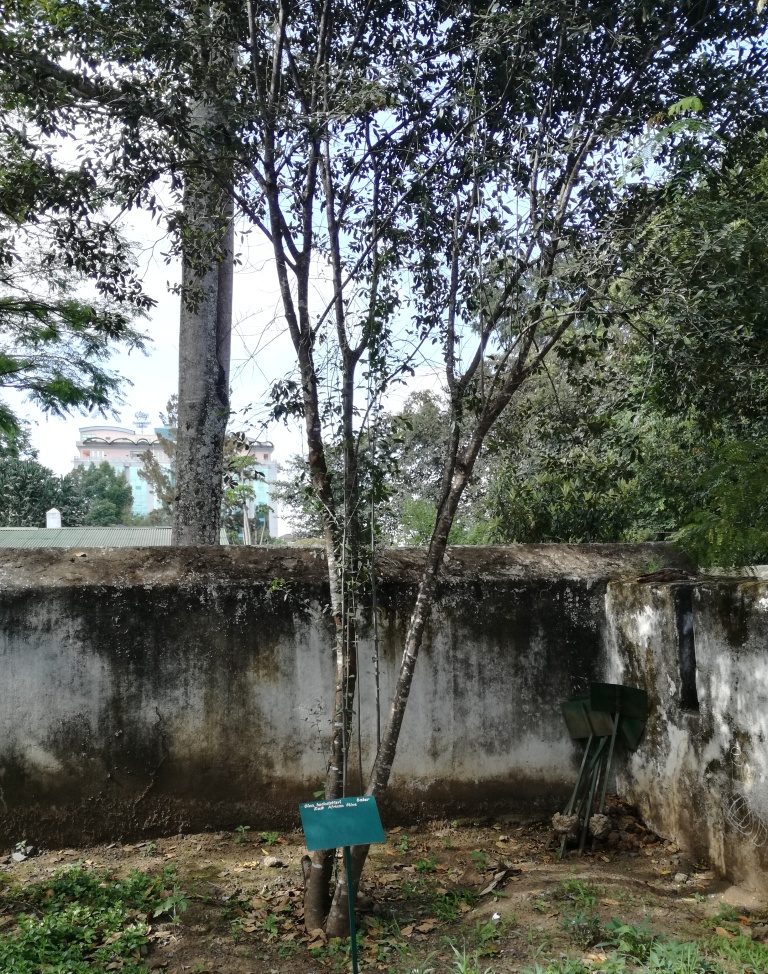

Scientific classification
- Kingdom: Plantae
- Clade: Embryophytes
- Clade: Tracheophytes
- Clade: Spermatophytes
- Clade: Angiosperms
- Clade: Eudicots
- Clade: Asterids
- Order: Lamiales
- Family: Oleaceae
- Genus: Olea
- Species: O. capensis
- Subspecies: O. c. subsp. macrocarpa

Trinomial name
- Olea capensis subsp. macrocarpa (C.H.Wright) I.Verd.

Synonyms
- Linociera urophylla Gilg; Olea capensis subsp. hochstetteri (Baker) Friis & P.S.Green; Olea guineensis Hutch. & C.A.Sm.; Olea hochstetteri Baker; Olea macrocarpa C.H.Wright; Olea madagascariensis Boivin ex H.Perrier; Olea perrieri A.Chev. ex H.Perrier; Olea urophylla (Gilg) Gilg & G.Schellenb.; Steganthus urophyllus (Gilg) Knobl.

= Olea capensis subsp. macrocarpa =

Species of plant

Olea capensis subsp. macrocarpa is a subspecies of tree of the family Oleaceae. Like the related species Olea welwitschii, it grows in sandy desert regions of Kenya, Tanzania and Uganda. It is an inconspicuous plant that does not attain great height, in contrast to O. welwitschii which can attain a height of 25 metres.

== Uses ==
Both these species are sources of firewood, but the wood is also valued for its prominent veins, similar to that of the European olive though finer in texture. As hardwoods they are considered suitable for flooring, furniture, carving, turning and veneers. The leaves have been used in folk medicine as an antibacterial, a property which has found some support in the laboratory.
