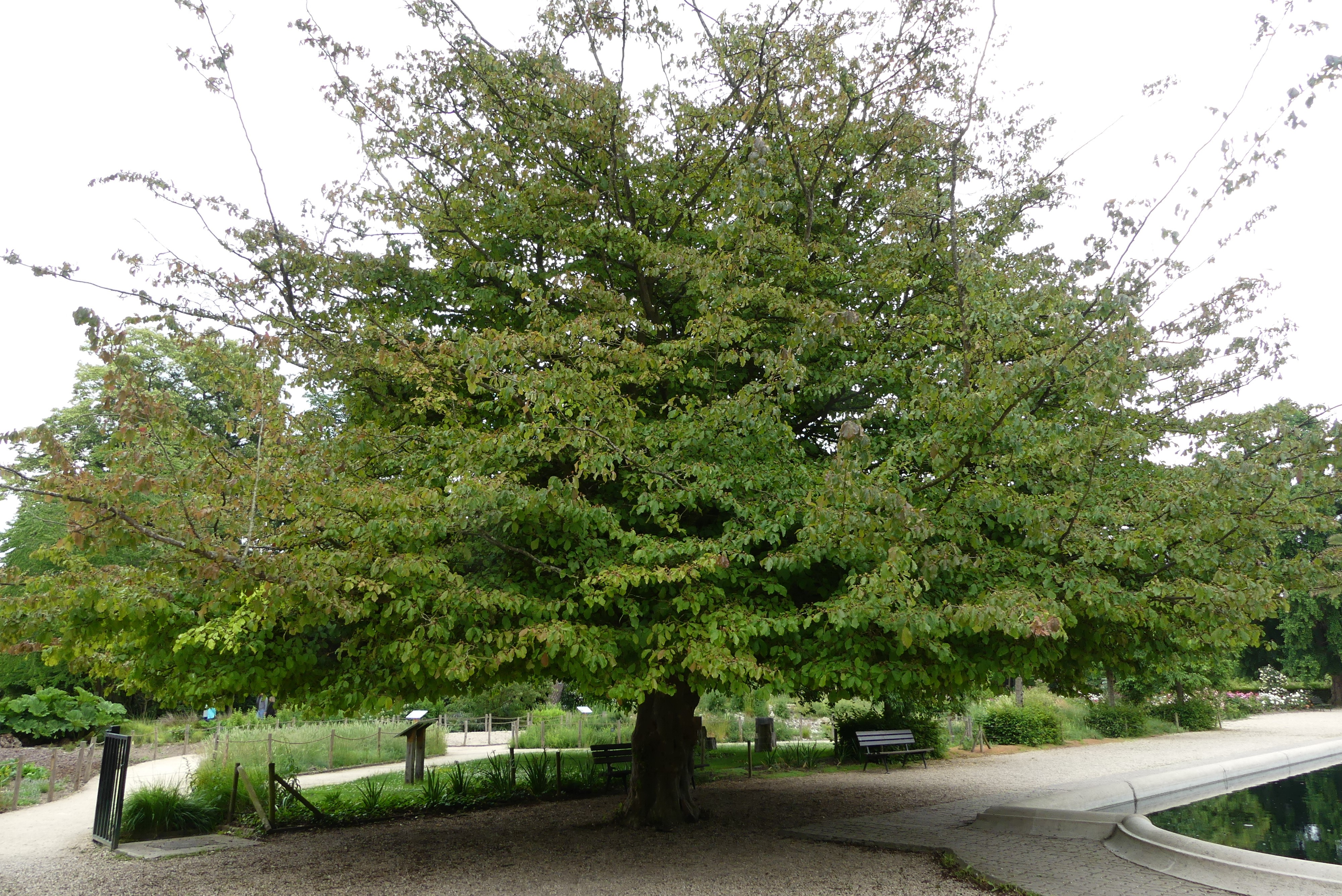
- Parrotia persica

Scientific classification
- Kingdom: Plantae
- Clade: Tracheophytes
- Clade: Angiosperms
- Clade: Eudicots
- Order: Saxifragales
- Family: Hamamelidaceae
- Tribe: Fothergilleae
- Genus: Parrotia; C.A.Mey.

species
- Parrotia persica (DC.) C.A.Mey.; Parrotia subaequalis (Hung T.Chang) R.M.Hao & H.T.Wei

Synonyms
- Shaniodendron M.B.Deng, H.T.Wei & X.Q.Wang

= Parrotia =

Genus of flowering plants

Parrotia is a genus of flowering plants in the witch hazel family, Hamamelidaceae. It includes two species native to Asia.

- Parrotia persica (DC.) C.A.Mey. – Iran and Transcaucasus
- Parrotia subaequalis (Hung T.Chang) R.M.Hao & H.T.Wei – southeastern China

== Fossil record ==
Among the middle Miocene Sarmatian palynoflora from the Lavanttal Basin, Austria, researchers have recognized Parrotia fossil pollen. The sediment containing it had accumulated in a lowland wetland environment with various vegetation units of mixed evergreen/deciduous broadleaved/conifer forests surrounding the wetland basin. Key relatives of the fossil taxa found with Parrotia are presently confined to humid warm temperate environments, suggesting a subtropical climate during the middle Miocene in Austria.
