= Iron tree =

Iron tree may refer to:

- Olea europaea subsp. cuspidata, a subspecies of the olive tree
- Parrotia persica, a tree species found in Iran and Azerbaijan
- Prosopis africana, a tree species found in Africa
- The Iron Tree, the first book in the Crowthistle Chronicles, written by Cecilia Dart-Thornton
- The nickname of a tree discovered in 1896 in Three Tuns, Pennsylvania, United States

== See also ==
- Iron wood (disambiguation)
- Wooden iron, a polemical term often used in philosophical rhetoric to describe the impossibility of an opposing argument
