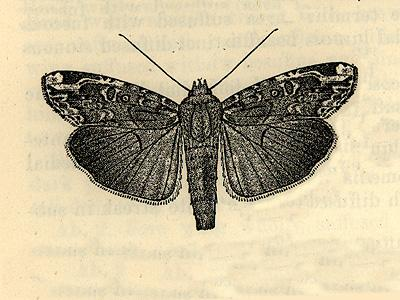
- Magusa orbifera

Scientific classification
- Domain: Eukaryota
- Kingdom: Animalia
- Phylum: Arthropoda
- Class: Insecta
- Order: Lepidoptera
- Superfamily: Noctuoidea
- Family: Noctuidae
- Subfamily: Amphipyrinae
- Genus: Magusa; Walker, 1857

Synonyms
- Callixena Saalmüller, 1891; Parastenopterygia Berio, 1955

= Magusa (moth) =

Genus of moths

Magusa is a genus of moths of the family Noctuidae first described by Francis Walker in 1857.

== Description ==
Similar to Euplexa, differs in third joint of palpi reaching above vertex of head. Dorsal tufts of abdomen are slight. Forewings very long and narrow. Apex rounded with oblique outer margin.

== Species ==
- Magusa barbara (Berio, 1940) Eritrea
- Magusa divaricata (Grote, 1874)
- Magusa erema Hayes, 1975 Galápagos Islands
- Magusa orbifera (Walker, 1857) southern Canada - US - Argentina
- Magusa versicolora (Saalmüller, 1891) Ghana, Nigeria, Cameroon, Central African Republic, Zaire, Malawi, Arabia, Ethiopia, Kenya, Tanzania, Zimbabwe, South Africa, Madagascar, Comoros, Reunion
- Magusa viettei (Berio, 1955) Yemen, Kenya, Tanzania, South Africa, Madagascar
