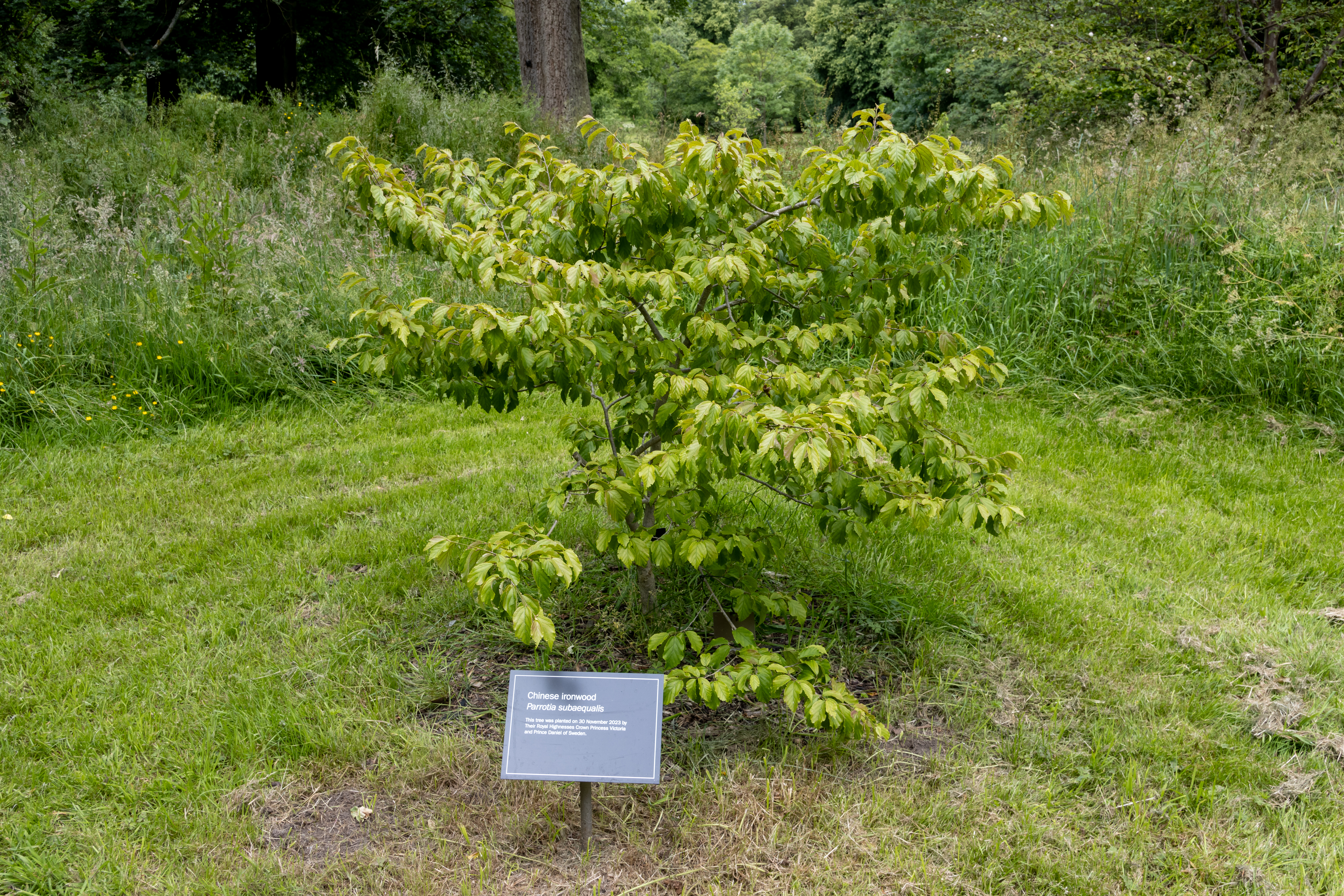

Scientific classification
- Kingdom: Plantae
- Clade: Tracheophytes
- Clade: Angiosperms
- Clade: Eudicots
- Order: Saxifragales
- Family: Hamamelidaceae
- Genus: Parrotia
- Species: P. subaequalis

Binomial name
- Parrotia subaequalis (Hung T.Chang) R.M.Hao & H.T.Wei

Synonyms
- Hamamelis subaequalis Hung T.Chang (1960) (basionym); Shaniodendron subaequale (H.T.Chang) M.B.Deng, H.T.Wei & X.Q.Wang

= Parrotia subaequalis =

Species of flowering plant

Parrotia subaequalis commonly called Chinese ironwood, is a species of flowering plant in the family Hamamelidaceae. It is a tree native to Anhui, southern Jiangsu, and northern Zhejiang provinces in southeastern China. There are five disjunct populations of P. subaequalis in eastern China: two each in Jiangsu and Zhejiang provinces (Huang et al. 2005) and one in Anhui (Shao and Fang 2004).

P. subaequalis is also considered critically endangered (Grade I Key protected Wild Plant) in the China Red Data Book, with a very narrow distribution range. The five known relict populations of P. subaequalis comprise no more than 100 reproductive individuals. Therefore, this species has high conservation priority.
