= Terminalia canescens =

Joolal

Scientific classification
- Kingdom: Plantae
- Clade: Tracheophytes
- Clade: Angiosperms
- Clade: Eudicots
- Clade: Rosids
- Order: Myrtales
- Family: Combretaceae
- Genus: Terminalia
- Species: T. canescens

Binomial name
- Terminalia canescens DC. Radlk.

Species of tree

Terminalia canescens, commonly known as joolal, winged nut tree, or wingnut, and also known by its Aboriginal name djilanydjin in north-western Australia, is a tree of the family Combretaceae native to northern parts of Australia.

== Description ==
The small tree or shrub typically grows to a height of 1 to 10 metres (3 to 33 ft) in height and is deciduous or semi-deciduous. It blooms between July and January producing white-cream-green flowers. The species is very similar to Terminalia bursarina but has larger leaves and fruits.

The bark is grey to brown in colour and sheds in coarse flakes. Leaf blades are narrowly elliptic to oblanceolate in shape with length of 28 to 75 millimetres (1.10 to 2.95 in) and a width of 5 to 35 mm (0.20 to 1.38 in). The inflorescences are 15 to 90 mm (0.59 to 3.54 in) long producing dry winged fruit with a flattened, elliptic to obovate shape and a length of 15 to 40 mm (0.59 to 1.57 in).

It is found in a variety of habitats over laterite or sandstone in the Kimberley region of Western Australia and the Northern Territory growing in sandy-stony soils.

== Uses ==
The leaves, bark and stems of this plant are used in Australian native tea known as "Jilungin tea". This tea is promoted as aiding relaxation and sleep. The tea is said to have a mild, earthy flavour and aroma, similar to green tea or grass. This tea is used by the Indigenous Nyul Nyul people of the Kimberley in Western Australia to promote deep sleep, and as a digestive tonic to provide energy during the day.

A 2017 report by the Centre for Nutrition and Food Sciences, Queensland Alliance for Agriculture and Food, showed antioxidant levels similar to or exceeding those of green tea in a sample of Terminalia canescens prepared as Jilungun Tea.

== Cultivation ==
A project is under way as of 2021 to cultivate the tree alongside orchards of gubinge (Terminalia ferdinandiana, aka Kakadu plum) in the Broome area.
