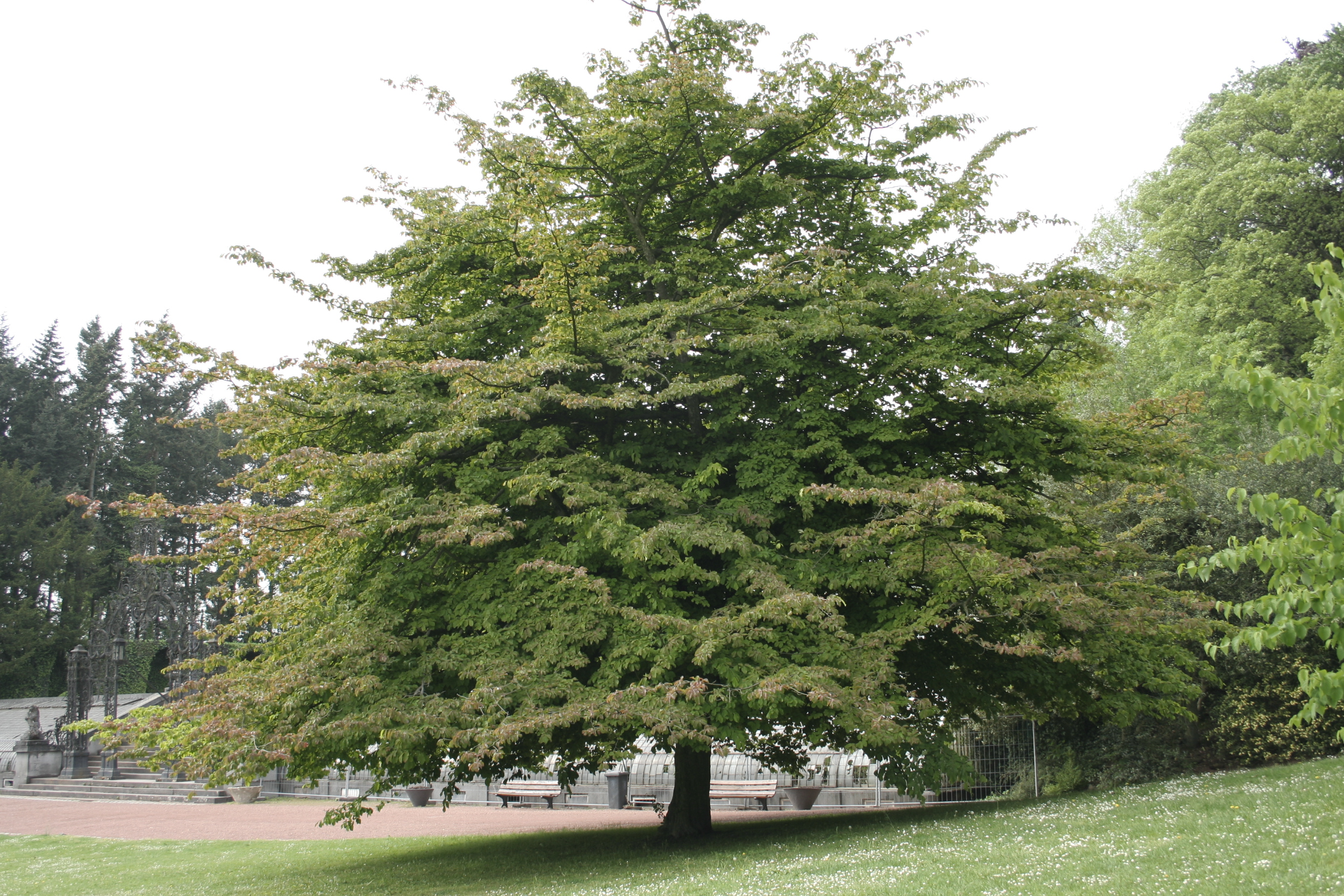
- Specimen planted in Belgium

Scientific classification
- Kingdom: Plantae
- Clade: Embryophytes
- Clade: Tracheophytes
- Clade: Angiosperms
- Clade: Eudicots
- Order: Saxifragales
- Family: Hamamelidaceae
- Genus: Parrotia
- Species: P. persica

Binomial name
- Parrotia persica (DC.) C.A.Mey.

Synonyms
- Hamamelis persica DC. (1830) (basionym); Parrotia siderodendron C.A.Mey. ex Ledeb.

= Parrotia persica =

Species of tree in the witch-hazel family

Parrotia persica, the Persian ironwood, is a deciduous tree in the family Hamamelidaceae, closely related to the witch-hazel genus Hamamelis. It is native to the Caspian region of northern Iran (where it is called انجیلی anjili) and southeastern Azerbaijan (where it is called Dəmirağacı). It is endemic in the Alborz mountains, where it is found mainly in Golestan National Park.

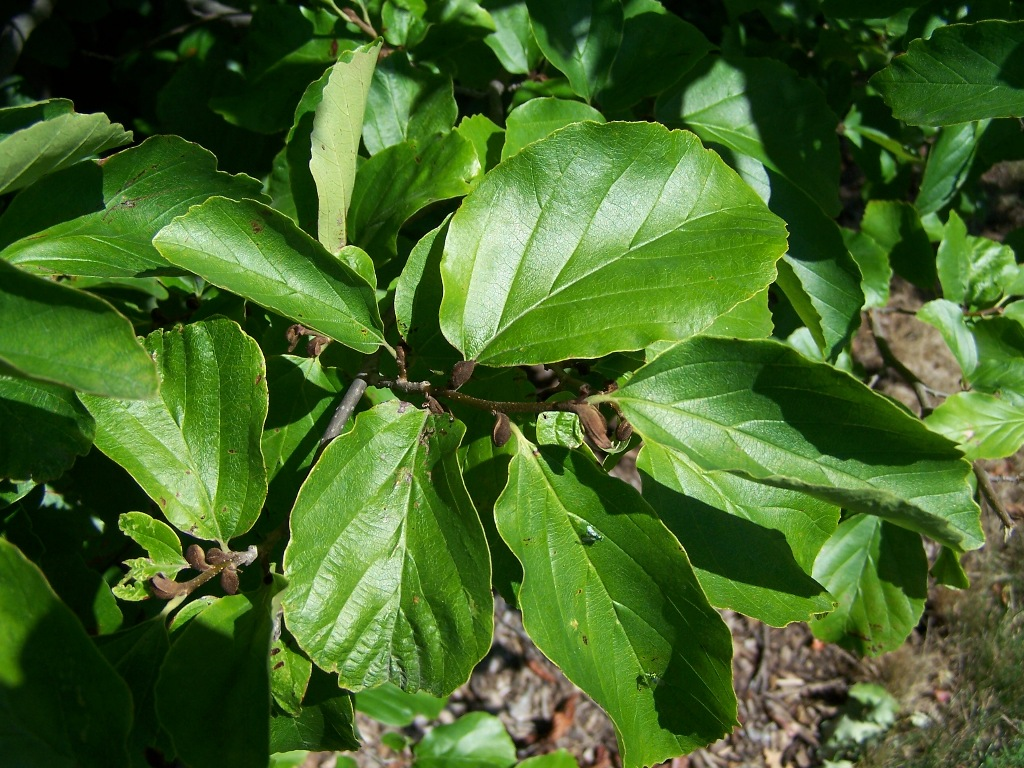
Foliage

== Description ==
Parrotia persica grows swiftly when young, maturing in gardens to 30 m (98 ft) tall and 8–15 m (26–49 ft) broad, multi-stemmed and naturally somewhat congested but prunable to a single trunk up to 150 cm (59 in) in diameter. The bark is smooth, pinkish-brown flaking/peeling to leave a mosaic of cinnamon, pink, green, and pale yellow patches in a similar manner to plane trees. The leaves are alternate, ovoid, often slightly lop-sided, 6–15 cm (2–6 in) long and 4–10 cm (2–4 in) across, with wavy margins; they are glossy green, turning in autumn to a rich purple to orange and brilliant red, often on the same tree.

The flowers are somewhat similar to witch-hazel flowers but dark red; they are likewise produced in late winter on bare stems, but differ in having only four rounded sepals with no petals; the stamens are however fairly conspicuous, forming a dense red cluster 3–4 mm (1/8–3/16 in) across. The fruit is a two-parted capsule containing two seeds, one in each half.

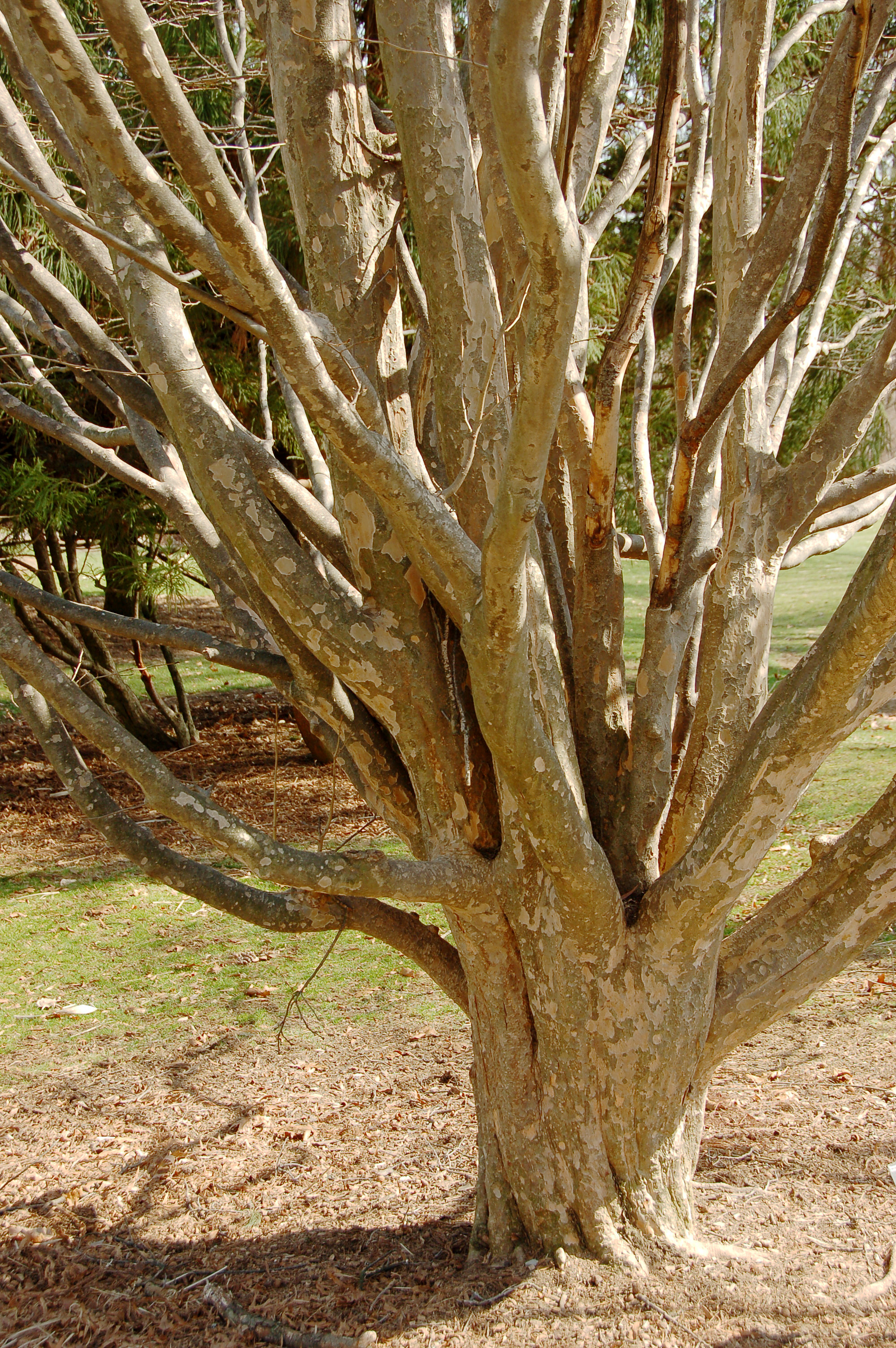
Persian ironwood at Hershey Gardens in Hershey, Pennsylvania

== Taxonomy ==
The species was first described as Hamamelis persica by Augustin Pyramus de Candolle in 1830. In 1831 Carl Anton von Meyer placed it in the new genus Parrotia, which he named in honor of his predecessor at the Imperial University of Dorpat, German naturalist Georg Friedrich Parrot, who botanized in the Alborz on a mountaineering expedition in the 1830s.

== Cultivation ==
Parrotia persica is cultivated as an ornamental tree for its brilliant autumn colour and the smooth, patterned bark. As an uncommon, drought-tolerant garden tree of moderate size, it is prized for its striking autumn colour and the exfoliating bark that develops on mature specimens.

Several cultivars have been selected for garden planting:

- 'Horizontalis': semi-weeping, wide-spreading horizontal branching pattern.
- 'Pendula' (Kew Form): Compact, weeping, quite graceful
- 'Select': Young leaves have purple margins, otherwise same as species
- 'Vanessa': Upright, columnar habit

'Vanessa' has gained the Royal Horticultural Society's Award of Garden Merit.

== Gallery ==
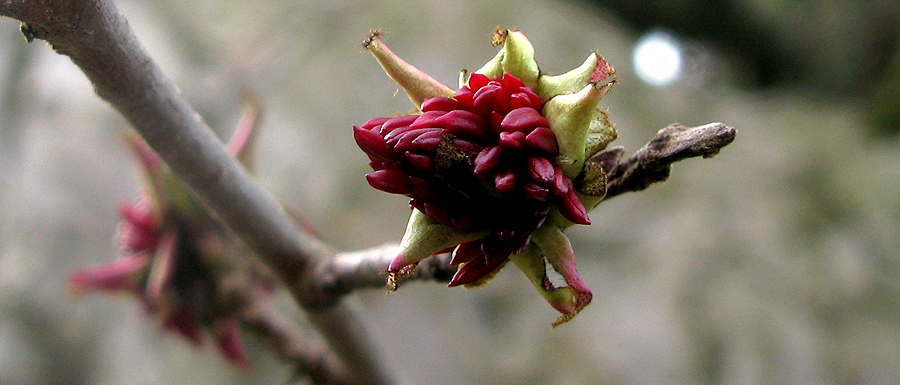
February flowers

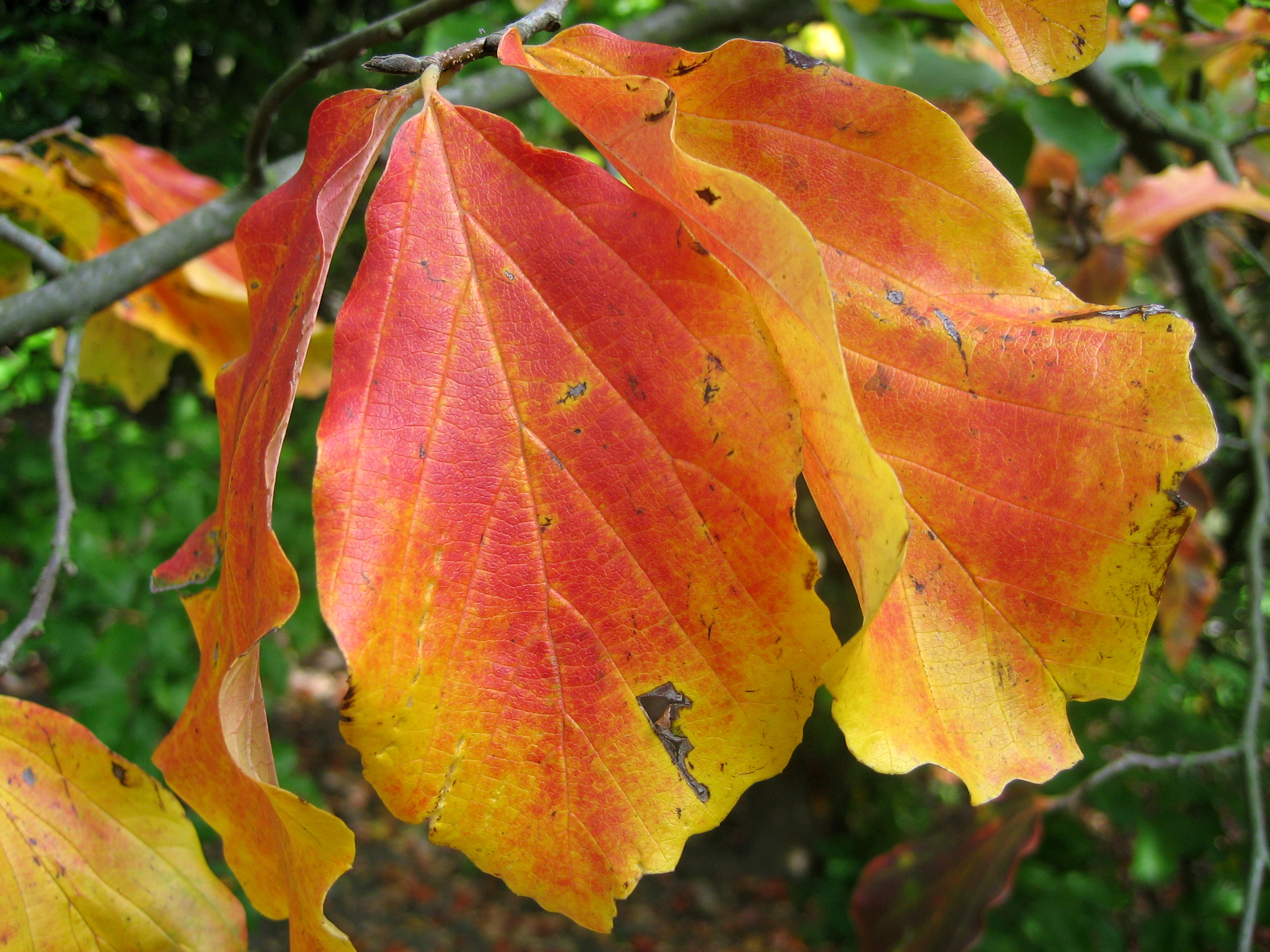
September leaves

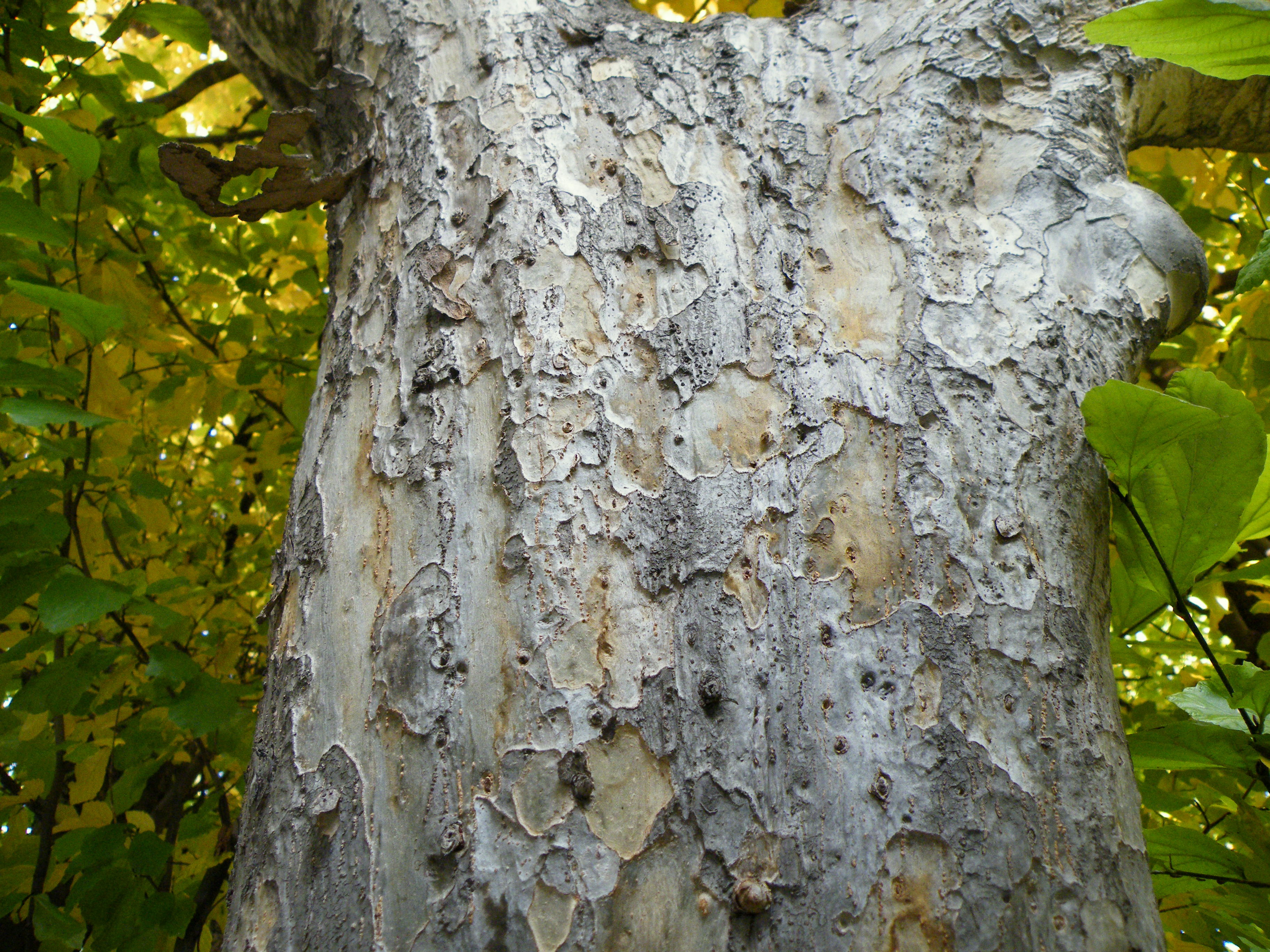
Bark of a specimen in the Jevremovac Botanical Garden
