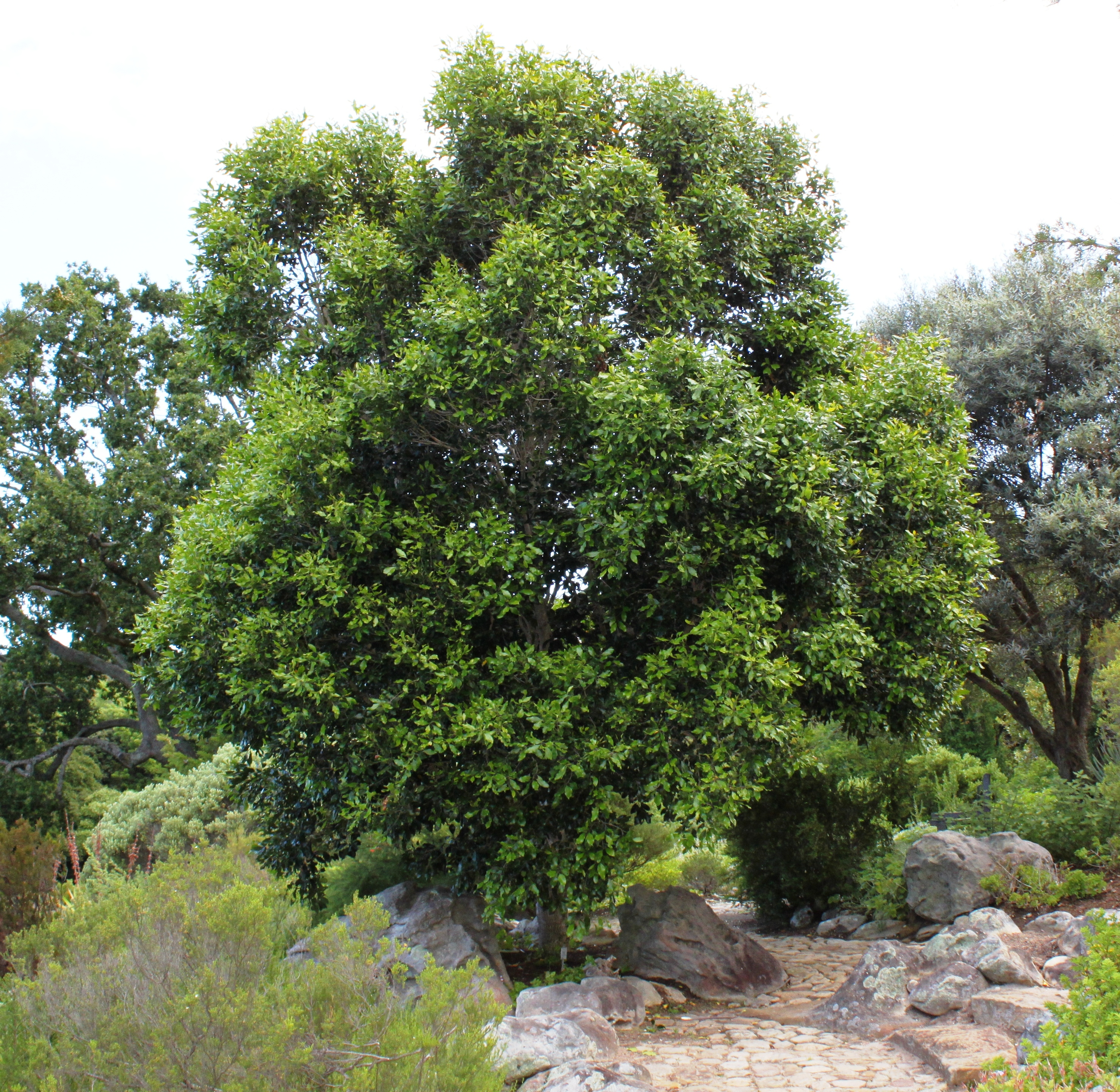
- In Cape Town

Conservation status
- Least Concern (IUCN 3.1)

Scientific classification
- Kingdom: Plantae
- Clade: Embryophytes
- Clade: Tracheophytes
- Clade: Spermatophytes
- Clade: Angiosperms
- Clade: Eudicots
- Clade: Asterids
- Order: Lamiales
- Family: Oleaceae
- Genus: Olea
- Species: O. capensis

Binomial name
- Olea capensis L.
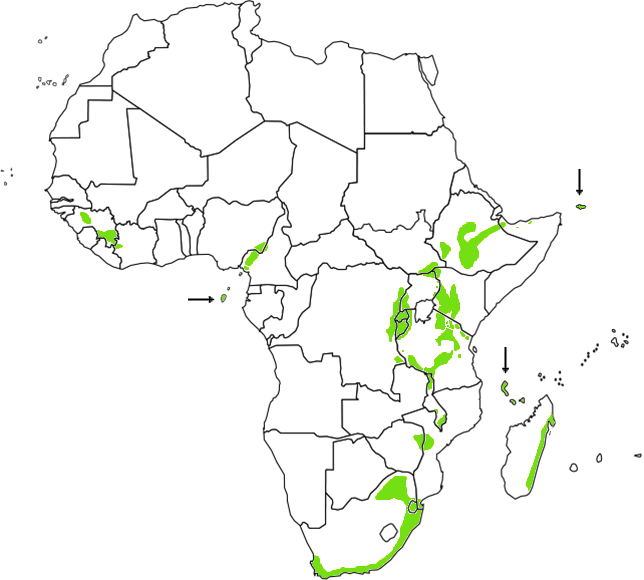
- approximate range

Synonyms
- Olea laurifolia Lam.

= Olea capensis =

Black ironwood

Species of tree with a dense wood

Olea capensis, the black ironwood, is an African tree species in the olive family Oleaceae. It is widespread in sub-Saharan Africa: from the east in Somalia, Ethiopia and Sudan, south to the tip of South Africa, and west to Cameroon, Sierra Leone and the islands of the Gulf of Guinea, as well as Madagascar and the Comoros. It occurs in bush, littoral scrub and evergreen forest.

Other common names in English include ironwood, ironwood olive, East African olive and Elgon olive.

== Description ==
The black ironwood is a bushy shrub, or a small to medium-sized tree, up to 10 metres (33 ft) in height, occasionally reaching 40 metres (130 ft).

- Bark: light grey, becoming dark grey and vertically fissured with age; a characteristic blackish gum is exuded from bark wounds.
- Leaves: light to dark green and glossy above and paler green below; petiole often purplish, 0.3–1.7 cm long; lanceolate-oblong to almost circular, 3–10 x 1.5–5 cm.
- Flowers: white or cream and sweetly scented, small and in many flowered axillary or terminal heads, bisexual, 3–15 cm long.
- Fruit: when ripe they are somewhat succulent purplish drupes; ovoid up to 2 x 1 cm.

=== Subspecies ===
The species has been divided into 3 subspecies:

- Olea capensis subsp. macrocarpa: flowers in lax heads, fruits oblong to elliptic.
- Olea capensis subsp. capensis: flowers in dense heads, leaves very variable, apex often rounded, and fruits almost spherical to oblong elliptic.
- Olea capensis subsp. enervis: leaves usually broadly elliptic, apex tapering.

== Uses ==
=== Food ===
Olea capensis has masses of sweetly scented bisexual flowers that produce large edible fruits.

=== Timber ===
The wood of the tree is very hard, fine grained, and heavy, and although difficult to work, it is widely used for art and artifacts and is an excellent turnery wood. Guinness World Records lists this tree as the world's heaviest wood, with a specific gravity of 1.49, similar to that of anthracite or dry earth. This causes the wood to sink in water, unlike other wood materials. It is also one of the world's hardest woods according to the Janka hardness test.

=== Gardens ===
Olea capensis is cultivated as an ornamental tree in parks and gardens.

== Gallery ==
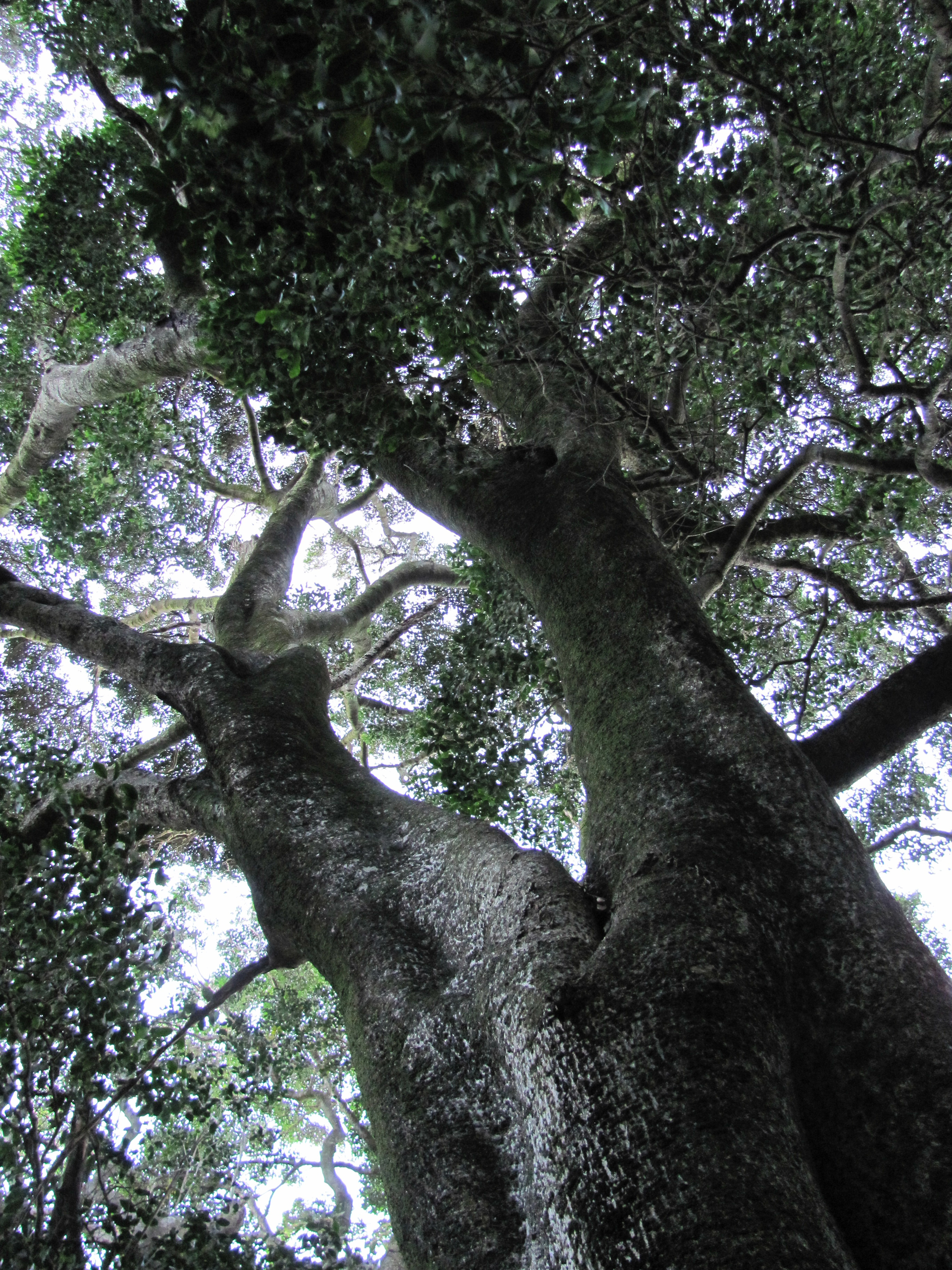
O. c. subsp. macrocarpa, large forest specimen

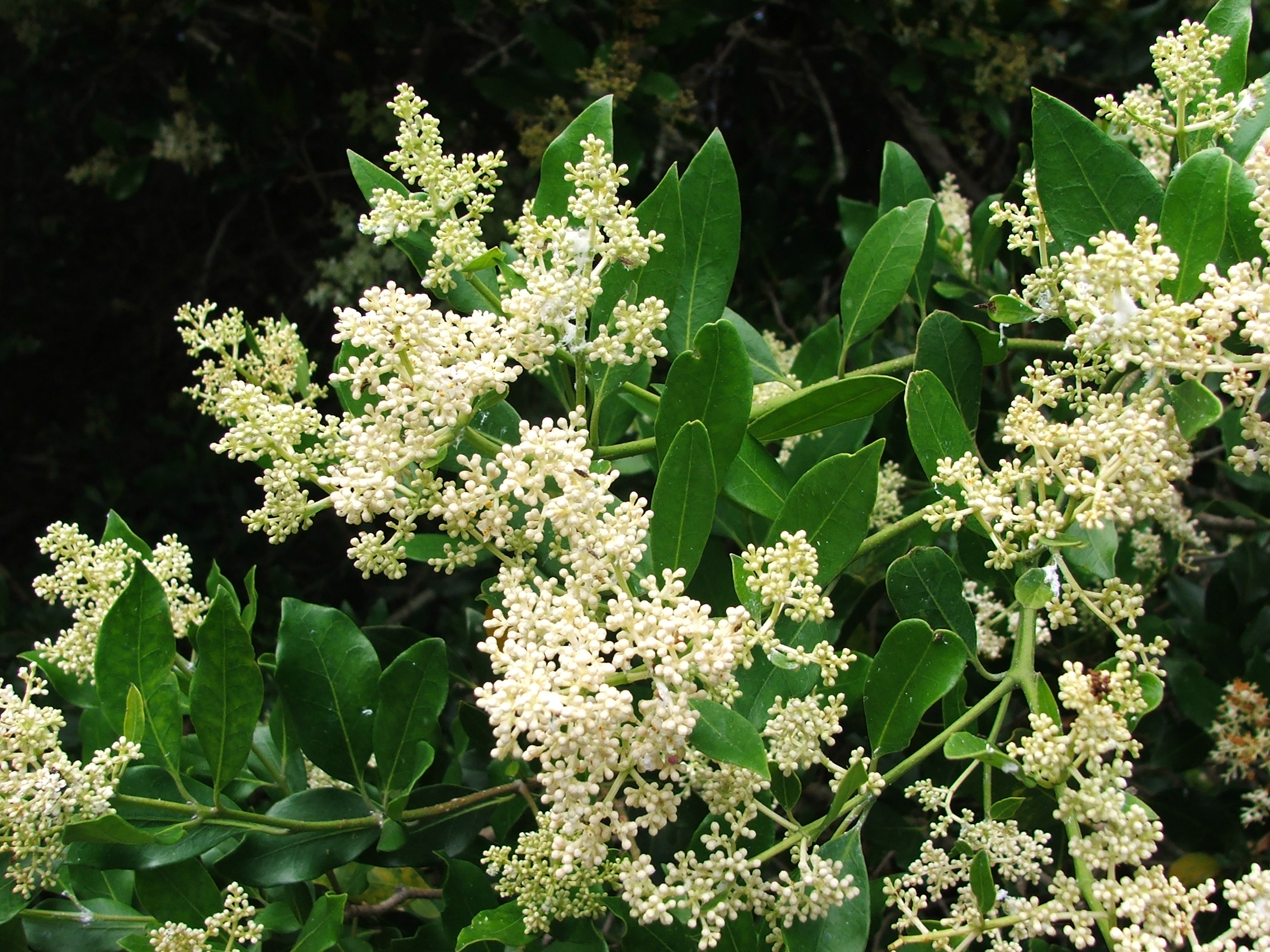
Flowers

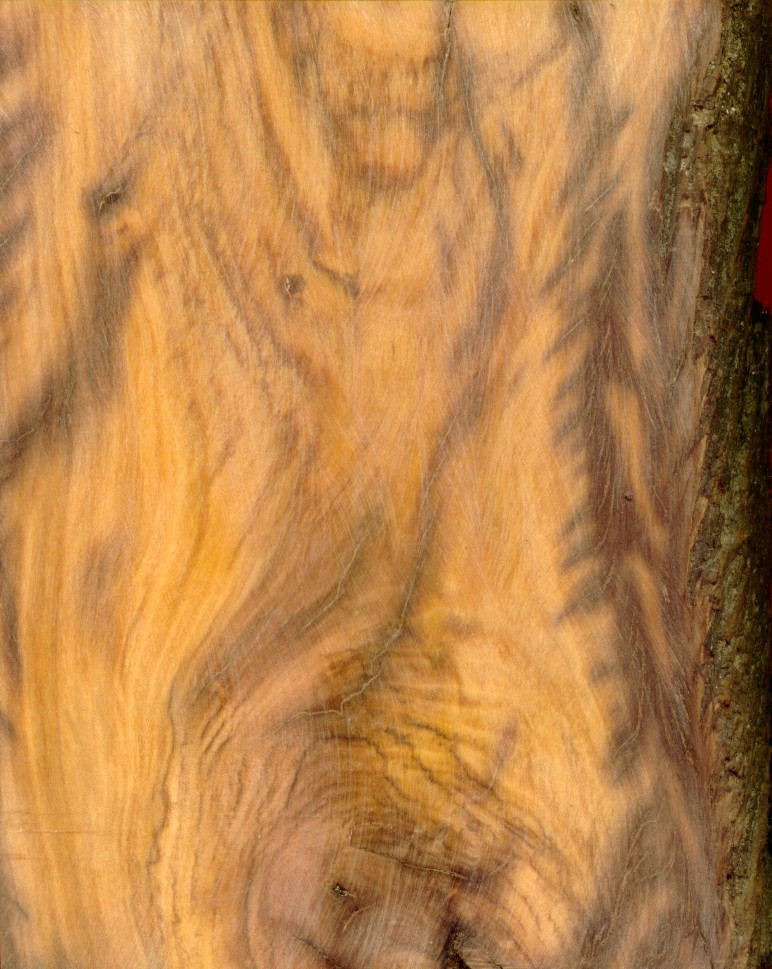
Timber

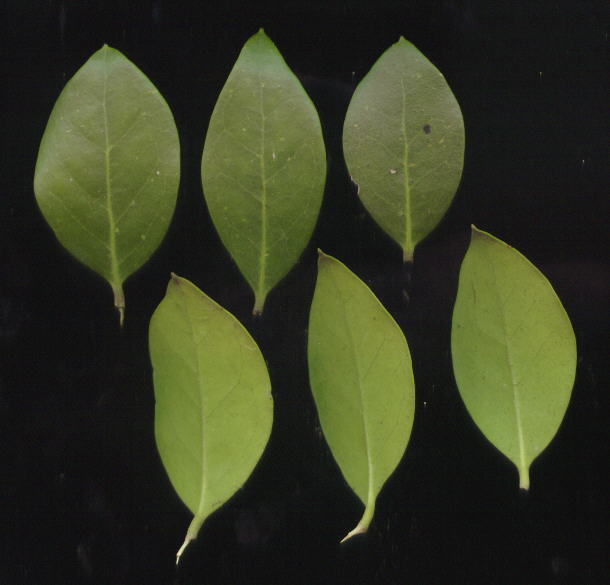
Leaves

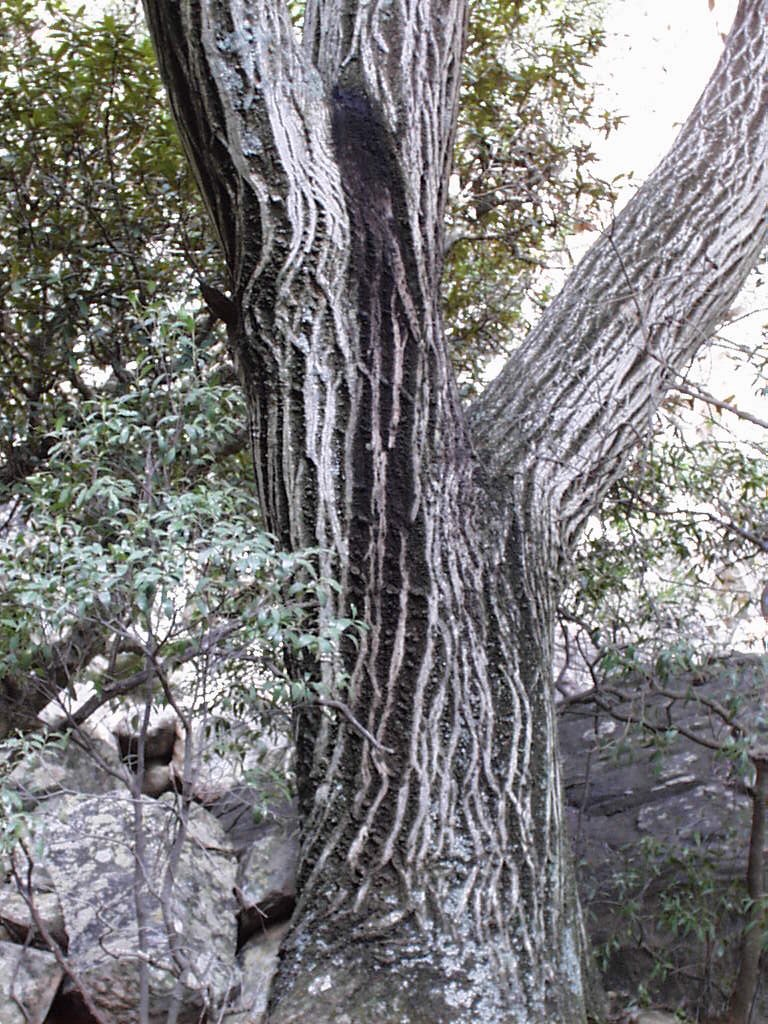
Trunk and bark of O. c. subsp. enervis
