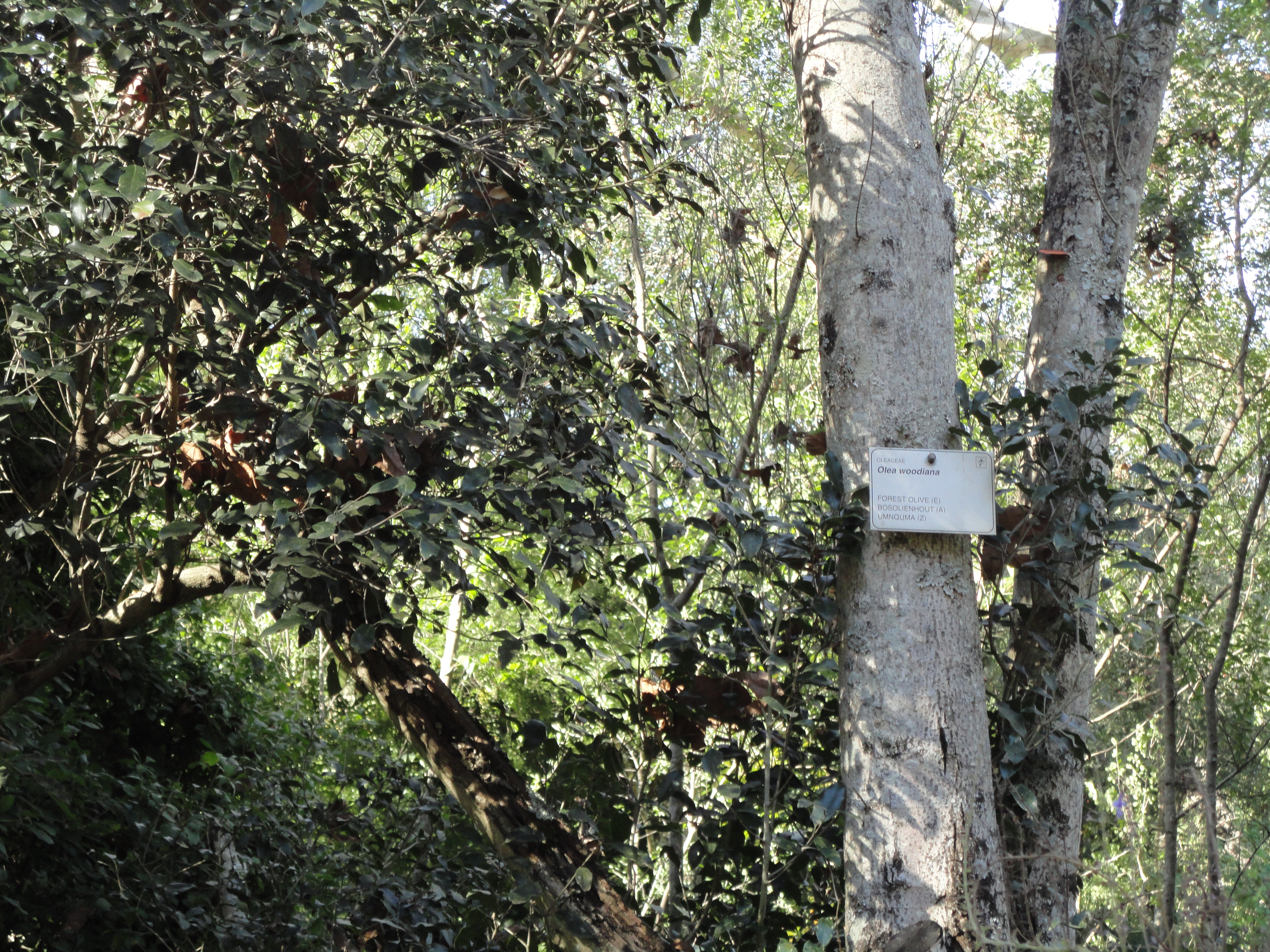
- In the KwaZulu-Natal Botanical Garden

Scientific classification
- Kingdom: Plantae
- Clade: Tracheophytes
- Clade: Angiosperms
- Clade: Eudicots
- Clade: Asterids
- Order: Lamiales
- Family: Oleaceae
- Genus: Olea
- Species: O. woodiana

Binomial name
- Olea woodiana Knobl.

= Olea woodiana =

Forest olive

Species of tree

Olea woodiana, known commonly as the forest olive or black ironwood (Afrikaans: Bosolienhout), is an African tree species belonging to the olive family (Oleaceae).

The tree grows in lower-elevation hill forests from Kenya, Tanzania, Eswatini, and South Africa.

== Description ==
Olea woodiana is a medium-sized to tall tree. The axillary or terminal inflorescences carry small white flowers that are fragrant.

Fruit are produced from late summer. They are oval-shaped and ripen to a purple black colour, when they are consumed by birds.

== Subspecies ==
There are two recognized subspecies:

- Olea woodiana subsp. disjuncta – Kenya, Tanzania
- Olea woodiana subsp. woodiana – Eswatini, South Africa
