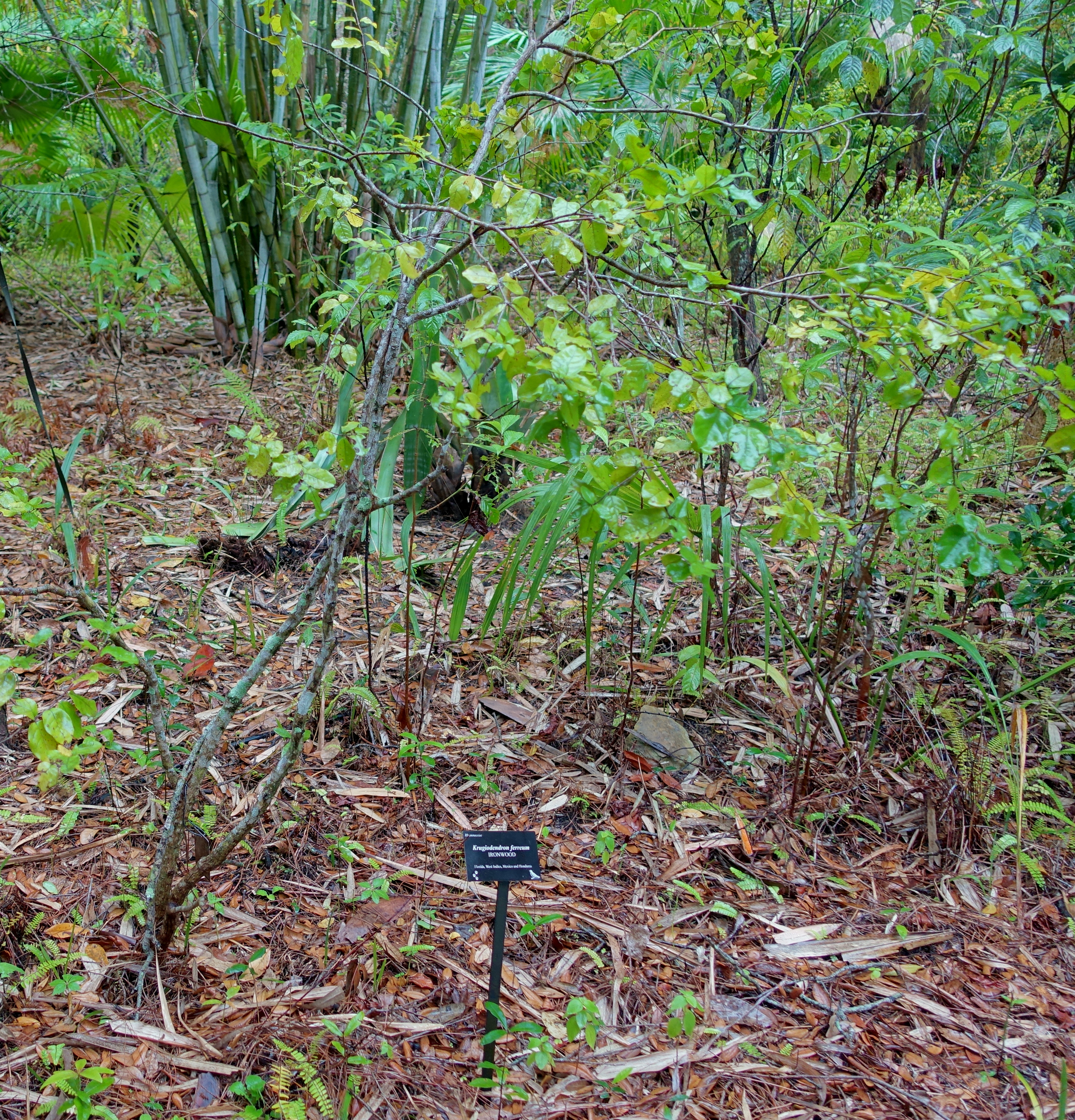

Conservation status
- Least Concern (IUCN 3.1)

Scientific classification
- Kingdom: Plantae
- Clade: Tracheophytes
- Clade: Angiosperms
- Clade: Eudicots
- Clade: Rosids
- Order: Rosales
- Family: Rhamnaceae
- Tribe: Rhamneae
- Genus: Krugiodendron; Urb.
- Species: K. ferreum

Binomial name
- Krugiodendron ferreum (Vahl) Urb.

Synonyms
- Synonymy: Ceanothus ferreus (Vahl) DC.; Condalia ferrea (Vahl) Griseb.; Crossopetalum integrifolium (Poir.) Kuntze; Myginda integrifolia Poir.; Krugiodendron acuminatum J.A.González & Poveda; Krugiodendron ferreum f. continentale Suess.; Reynosia laevigata Sarg.; Rhamnidium ferreum (Vahl) Sarg.; Rhamnidium revolutum Chapm., nom. illeg. homonym. post.; Rhamnus brandegeeana Standl.; Rhamnus ferrea Vahl; Rhamnus purpusii Brandegee, nom. illeg. homonym. post.; Scutia ferrea (Vahl) Brongn.; Scutia laevigata G.Don; Ziziphus emarginata Sw.

= Krugiodendron =

Genus of trees

Krugiodendron ferreum, commonly known as the black ironwood or leadwood, is a species of tree in the family Rhamnaceae. It is native to southern Florida, the Caribbean, Mexico, Central America from Guatemala to Costa Rica, Colombia, and Venezuela. Originally described by Martin Vahl, its specific epithet is the Latin adjective ferreus ("iron-like").

== Taxonomy ==
It is the only species in the genus Krugiodendron. The genus name honors Leopold Krug (1833–1898). The common names for this species refer to its dense wood.

== Description ==
Typical air-dry samples have densities of approximately 1.30 g/cm^{3}, and up to 1.42 g/cm^{3}. The tree reaches 5–10 metres (16–33 ft) in height with oppositely arranged, emarginate leaves and small greenish flowers. The fruit is a drupe 5 to 7 mm long turning purplish red as it matures.

It is widely cultivated in gardens or parks as a drought-tolerant specimen tree.
