= Chebulic =

Chebulic may refer to:

- Chebulic acid, a phenolic acid found in Terminalia chebula
- Chebulic myrobalan, a vernacular name for Terminalia chebula, a tree species native to southern Asia
