= Drakshasava =

Ayurvedic tonic made from grapes

Drakshasava (Sanskrit: द्राक्षासव) is a traditional Ayurvedic tonic made from grapes. Drakshasava is a weak wine because the grape juice is usually only partially fermented. It is also sometimes prepared by using raisin concentrate. The tonic is claimed to be beneficial for maladies such as lethargy, weakness and heat exhaustion. Drakshasava is believed to address health imbalances arising from an excess of the Vata-Vayu Dosha and is said to be useful in curing cardiac disorders and hemorrhoids in the Ayurvedic system.

== Etymology ==
Draksha is the Sanskrit word for grape. "Asava" means "distillate", "juice" or "extract". Thus "Drakshasava" means "extract from grapes".

== Historical references ==
Drakshasava found mention in the Sushruta Samhita, a book of remedies dating to the 3rd–4th century AD/CE.

== See also ==
- Churna
- Chyawanprash
- Dabur
- Dabur Research Foundation
- Grape syrup
- Rasayana
- Triphala
