= Churna =

Mixture used in Ayurvedic medicine

Churna (Sanskrit: चूर्ण cūrṇam "powder", Pali: चुण्ण chunam "powder") is a mixture of powdered herbs and or minerals used in Ayurvedic medicine. Triphala is an example of a classic Ayurvedic formula, used for thousands of years that is made from the powders of three fruits Amalaki (Phyllanthus emblica, syn. Emblica officinalis), Haritaki (Terminalia chebula) and Bibhitaki (Terminalia bellirica).
