= Chebulic acid =

- Chebulic acid, according to Lee, 2010.

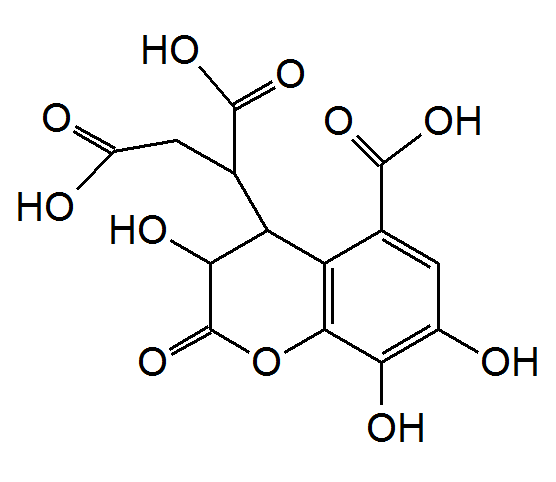
- Chebulic acid, according to Klika, 2004.

Names
- IUPAC name (2R)-2-[(3S)-3-carboxy-5,6,7-trihydroxy-1-oxo-3,4-ihydroisochromen-4-yl]butanedioic acid
- Other names Chebuloyl

Identifiers
CAS Number	23725-05-5
3D model (JSmol)	Interactive image
ChemSpider	27470963
PubChem CID	25255065
UNII	G66Q7V3DPP
CompTox Dashboard (EPA)	DTXSID30745432
- InChI: InChI=1S/C14H12O11/c15-5-1-4-7(10(19)9(5)18)8(3(12(20)21)2-6(16)17)11(13(22)23)25-14(4)24/h1,3,8,11,15,18-19H,2H2,(H,16,17)(H,20,21)(H,22,23)/t3-,8-,11-/m0/s1 Key: COZMWVAACFYLBI-XJEVXTIOSA-N; InChI=1/C14H12O11/c15-5-1-4-7(10(19)9(5)18)8(3(12(20)21)2-6(16)17)11(13(22)23)25-14(4)24/h1,3,8,11,15,18-19H,2H2,(H,16,17)(H,20,21)(H,22,23)/t3-,8-,11-/m0/s1 Key: COZMWVAACFYLBI-XJEVXTIOBW
- SMILES: c1c2c(c(c(c1O)O)O)[C@@H]([C@H](OC2=O)C(=O)O)[C@H](CC(=O)O)C(=O)O

Properties
Chemical formula	C_{14}H_{12}O_{11}
Molar mass	356.23 g/mol
Appearance	Brown powder
- Except where otherwise noted, data are given for materials in their standard state (at 25 °C [77 °F], 100 kPa). verify (what is ?) Infobox references

Chebulic acid is a phenolic compound isolated from the ripe fruits of Terminalia chebula.

This compound possesses an isomer, neochebulic acid.

Chebulic acid is a component of transformed ellagitannins such as chebulagic acid or chebulinic acid.
