= Han E =

Han E (pinyin) or Han O (Wade–Giles) may refer to:

- Han E (scholar) (韓鄂, fl. AD 750 or 875), Tang-era scholar-official
- Han E (warrior) (韓娥, born 1345), female rebel against the Yuan dynasty
