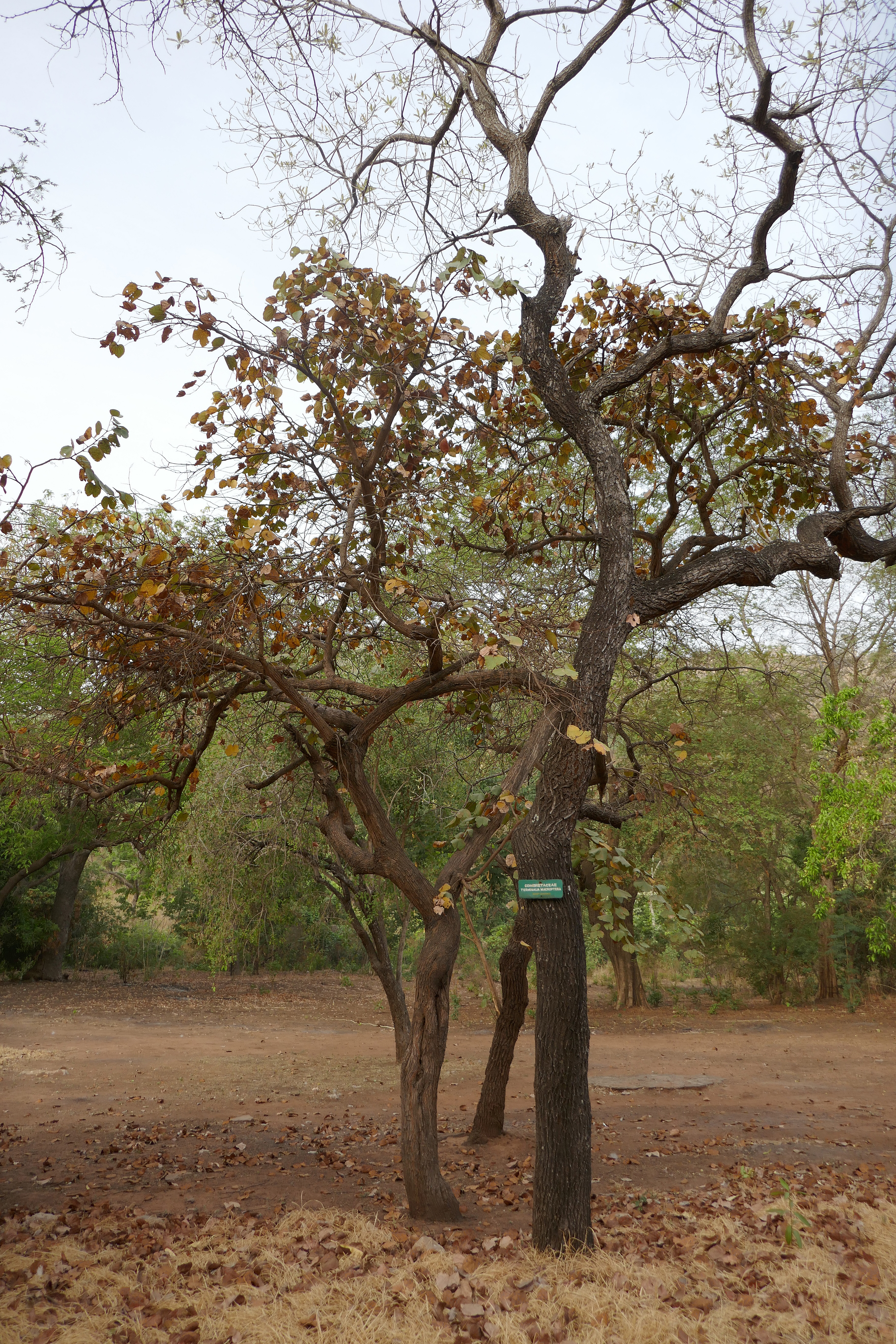

Scientific classification
- Kingdom: Plantae
- Clade: Tracheophytes
- Clade: Angiosperms
- Clade: Eudicots
- Clade: Rosids
- Order: Myrtales
- Family: Combretaceae
- Genus: Terminalia
- Species: T. macroptera

Binomial name
- Terminalia macroptera Guill. & Perr.

= Terminalia macroptera =

Species of flowering plant

Terminalia macroptera is a species of flowering plant in the White Mangrove Family (Combretaceae) known by the Hausa common name kwandari. It is native to Africa, where it can be found in Benin, Burkina Faso, Ghana, Senegal, Sudan, Uganda, Niger and Nigeria. Its most notable botanical feature is its very large winged seed or samara up to 13 cm (5.1 in) long by 3.75 cm (1.48 in) width.

== Uses ==
In several African countries Terminalia macroptera is used in traditional herbal medicine for infectious diseases, tuberculosis, hepatitis, and dysentery. Extracts of the plant have shown in vitro activity against Helicobacter pylori and Neisseria gonorrhoeae.

Parts of the plant are also used to make dye and perfumes.

== Chemical constituents ==
The leaves contain chlorogenic acid, quercetin, isoorientin, the ellagitannins chebulagic acid, chebulinic acid, punicalagin, and terflavin A, gallic acid, and ellagic acid. Different methylated ellagic acid derivatives and the triterpenoid terminolic acid can be found in the heartwood.

Chemical structure of terminolic acid

The plant also contains the hydrolyzable tannins isoterchebulin and 4,6-O-isoterchebuloyl-d-glucose which have a tetraphenylic acid moiety (isoterchebulic acid).
