= Emblicanin =

Chemical structure of emblicanin A

Emblicanins are a family of polyphenol compounds found in Indian gooseberry (Emblica officinalis). They are extracted commercially and used in dietary supplements, cosmetics, and topical products.
