= Triphala =

South and East Asian drink

- Ayurvedic terminology
- Sanskrit: त्रिफला (triphala)
- Hindi: त्रिफला
- Literal meaning: Three fruits

- Traditional Chinese: 三勒漿
- Simplified Chinese: 三勒浆
- Literal meaning: Three Myrobalan Juice
Transcriptions
Standard Mandarin
- Hanyu Pinyin: Sānlèjiāng
- Wade–Giles: San-lê-chiang

Triphala (Hindi: त्रिफला; Sanskrit: त्रिफला, triphalā, "three fruits") is a polyherbal Ayurvedic formulation, specifically a churna or powder, a kwatha or decoction or infusion produced from chebulic myrobalan (Sanskrit: हरीतकी, harītakī; Hindi: हरीतकी, haritaki), beleric myrobalan (Sanskrit: विभीतकी, vibhītakī; Hindi: बिभीतकी, bibhitaki), and emblic myrobalan (Sanskrit: आमलकी, āmalakī; Hindi: आँवला, ā̃vlā). Containing vitamin C, it is considered an Ayurvedic rasayana formula when the dried and powdered fruit are prepared in a 1:1:1 or 1:2:3 ratio. It is one of the most common Ayurvedic treatments in the world because of its ability to balance all three "doshas" simultaneously. Less prominently, as sanlejiang, the drink has a 1200-year history as a kind of fruit wine in China with the non-alcoholic form now being marketed there as a traditional herbal remedy.

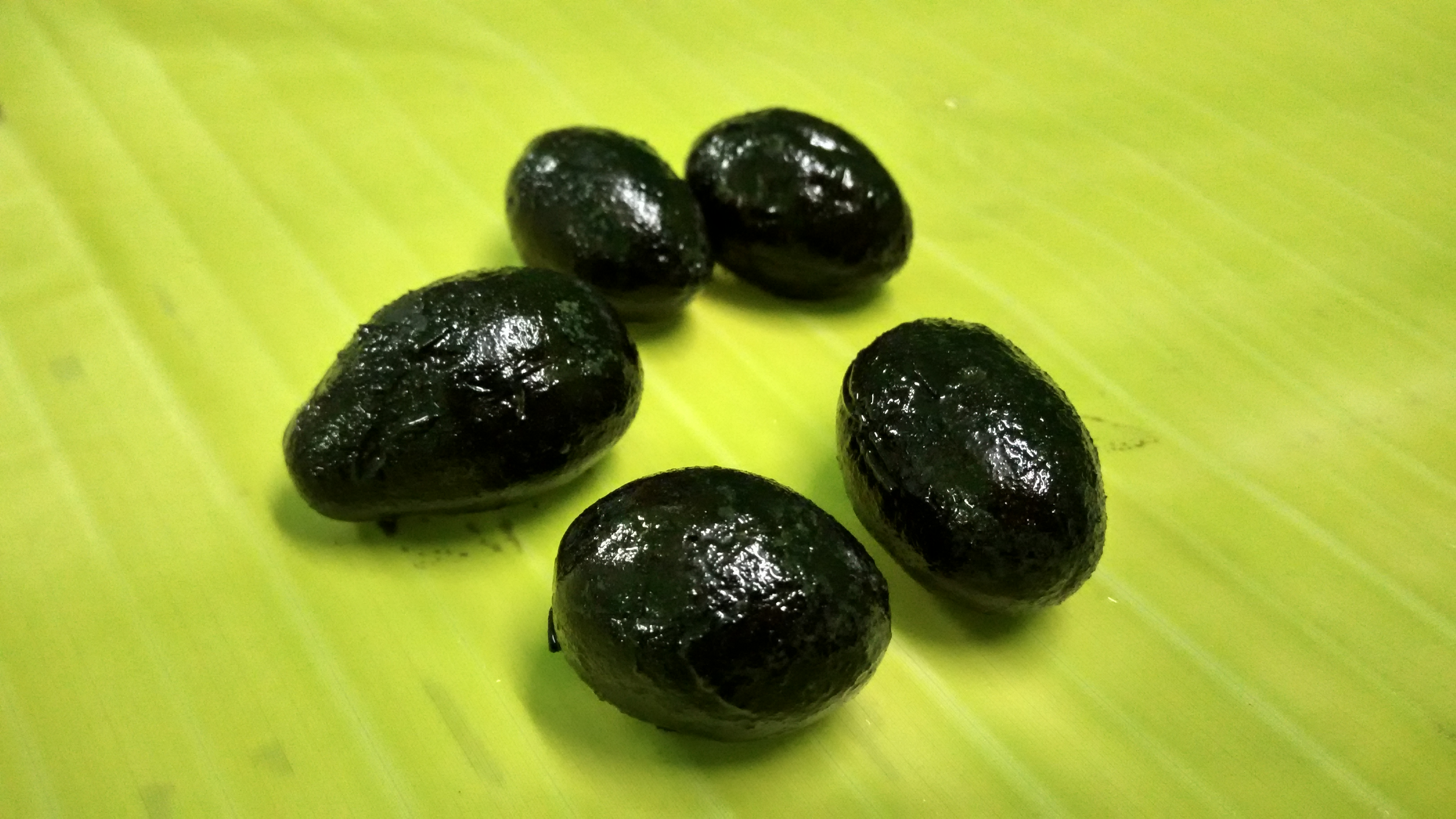
chebulic myrobalan

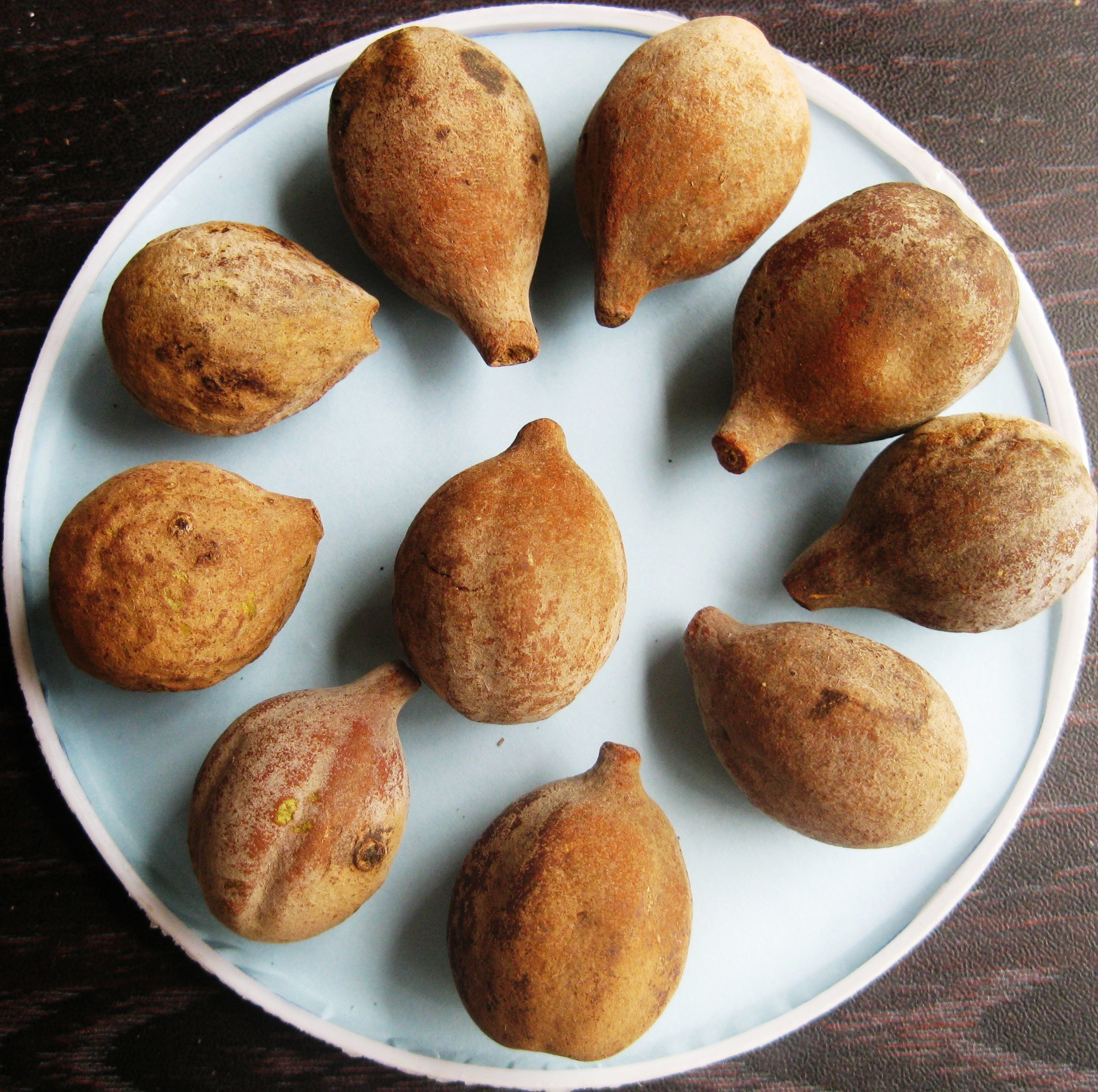
beleric myrobalan

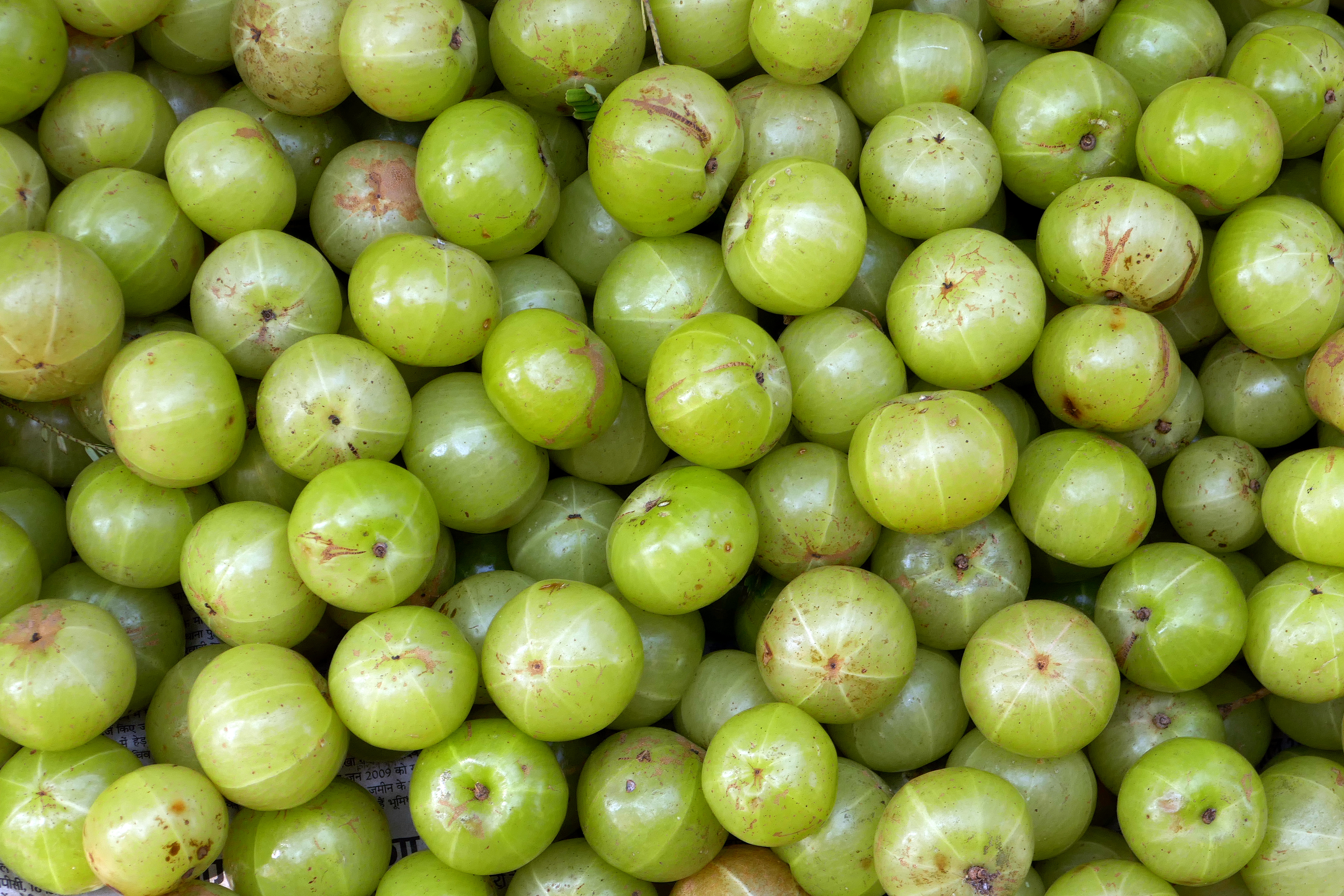
amla, emblic myrobalan

== History ==
The Charaka Samhita as we know today is from 1st century CE finds earliest records of Triphala. According to Charak, taking the Triphala Rasayana (Triphala with honey and ghee) daily has the potential to make a person live for one hundred years devoid of old age and diseases. Sushruta Samhita from 6th century CE and Bhavaprakasha Nighantu from 16th CE also mention triphala repeatedly.

The earliest record of triphala in China is Li Zhao's c. 820 Supplement to the Book of Tang (Tangguoshi Bu), which lists it in a section on domestic and foreign alcohol available in the Tang capital Chang'an. It states the Chinese formulation was based on a recipe from Persia. One such recipe is included in Han E's mid- or late-Tang Summary of the Four Seasons (《四時纂要》, Sì Shí Zuǎnyào), first published in 996: pulverize 3 liang (about 120 grams or 4 ounces) of the pits of each of the 3 fruits to a sesame seed consistency; thoroughly mix 1 dou (about 2 liters or 0.5 U.S. gallons) of clear honey with 2 dou of fresh clear water before adding the pulverized seeds; seal tightly with clean paper; open, stir, remove internal condensation, and reseal to allow fermentation to proceed; and reopen and consume after thirty days. Han praised the sweet resulting wine as a digestif, deflatulent, and mild laxative. The Ming-era encyclopedist Gao Lian copied much of this in his Eight Treatises on Nurturing Life (《遵生八笺》, Zūnshēng Bā Jiān) but emended the recipe to use 3 liang total in the mixture. Commenters varied as to whether preparation in the 8th or 9th lunar month (normally September or October) produced the best results.

== See also ==
- Ayurveda & Rasayana
- Traditional Chinese medicine & Chinese alcohol
- Herbal medicine
