= Chebulinic acid =

Names
- Other names 1,3,6-Tri-O-galloyl-2,4-chebuloyl-β-D-glucopyranoside

Identifiers
CAS Number	18942-26-2
3D model (JSmol)	Interactive image
ChEMBL	ChEMBL501154
ChemSpider	219295
PubChem CID	12401
UNII	HVC8VQJ6EK
CompTox Dashboard (EPA)	DTXSID30940460
- InChI: InChI=1S/C41H32O27/c42-15-1-10(2-16(43)26(15)51)35(56)62-9-22-31-33(66-36(57)11-3-17(44)27(52)18(45)4-11)34(41(63-22)68-37(58)12-5-19(46)28(53)20(47)6-12)67-38(59)13-7-21(48)29(54)32-25(13)24(30(55)40(61)65-32)14(8-23(49)50)39(60)64-31/h1-7,14,22,24,30-31,33-34,41-48,51-55H,8-9H2,(H,49, 50)/t14-,22+,24-,30-,31+,33-,34+,41-/m0/s1 Key: YGVHOSGNOYKRIH-FJPMMHPYSA-N
- SMILES: C1=C(C=C(C(=C1O)O)O)C(=O)OCC2C3C(C(C(O2)OC(=O)C4=CC(=C(C(=C4)O)O)O)OC(=O)C5=CC(=C(C6=C5C(C(C(=O)O3)CC(=O)O)C(C(=O)O6)O)O)O)OC(=O)C7=CC(=C(C(=C7)O)O)O

Properties
Chemical formula	C_{41}H_{32}O_{27}
Molar mass	956.680 g·mol^{−1}
- Except where otherwise noted, data are given for materials in their standard state (at 25 °C [77 °F], 100 kPa). verify (what is ?) Infobox references

Chebulinic acid is an ellagitannin found in the seeds of Euphoria longana, in the fruits of Terminalia chebula or in the leaves of T. macroptera.
