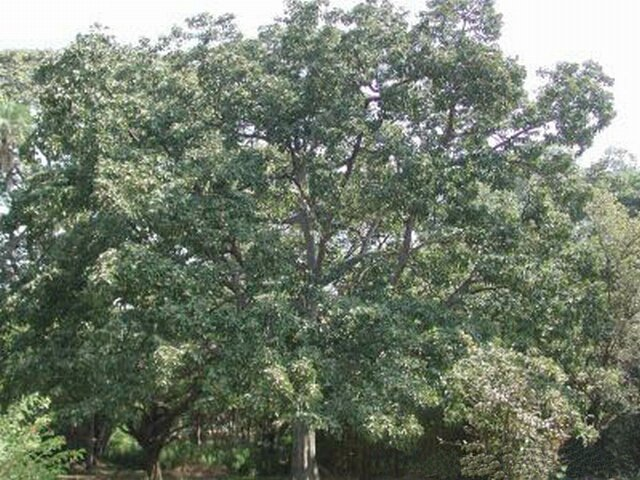

Conservation status
- Least Concern (IUCN 3.1)

Scientific classification
- Kingdom: Plantae
- Clade: Tracheophytes
- Clade: Angiosperms
- Clade: Eudicots
- Clade: Rosids
- Order: Myrtales
- Family: Combretaceae
- Genus: Terminalia
- Species: T. bellirica

Binomial name
- Terminalia bellirica (Gaertn.) Roxb.

= Terminalia bellirica =

Species of flowering plant

Terminalia bellirica, known as bahera, beleric or bastard myrobalan, is a large deciduous tree in the family Combretaceae. It is common on the plains and lower hills in South and Southeast Asia, where it is also grown as an avenue tree. The basionym is Myrobalanus bellirica Gaertn. (Fruct. Sem. Pl. 2: 90, t. 97. 1791). William Roxburgh transferred M. bellirica to Terminalia as "T. bellerica (Gaertn.) Roxb.". This spelling error is now widely used, causing confusion. The correct name is Terminalia bellirica (Gaertn.) Roxb.

== Leaves and seeds ==
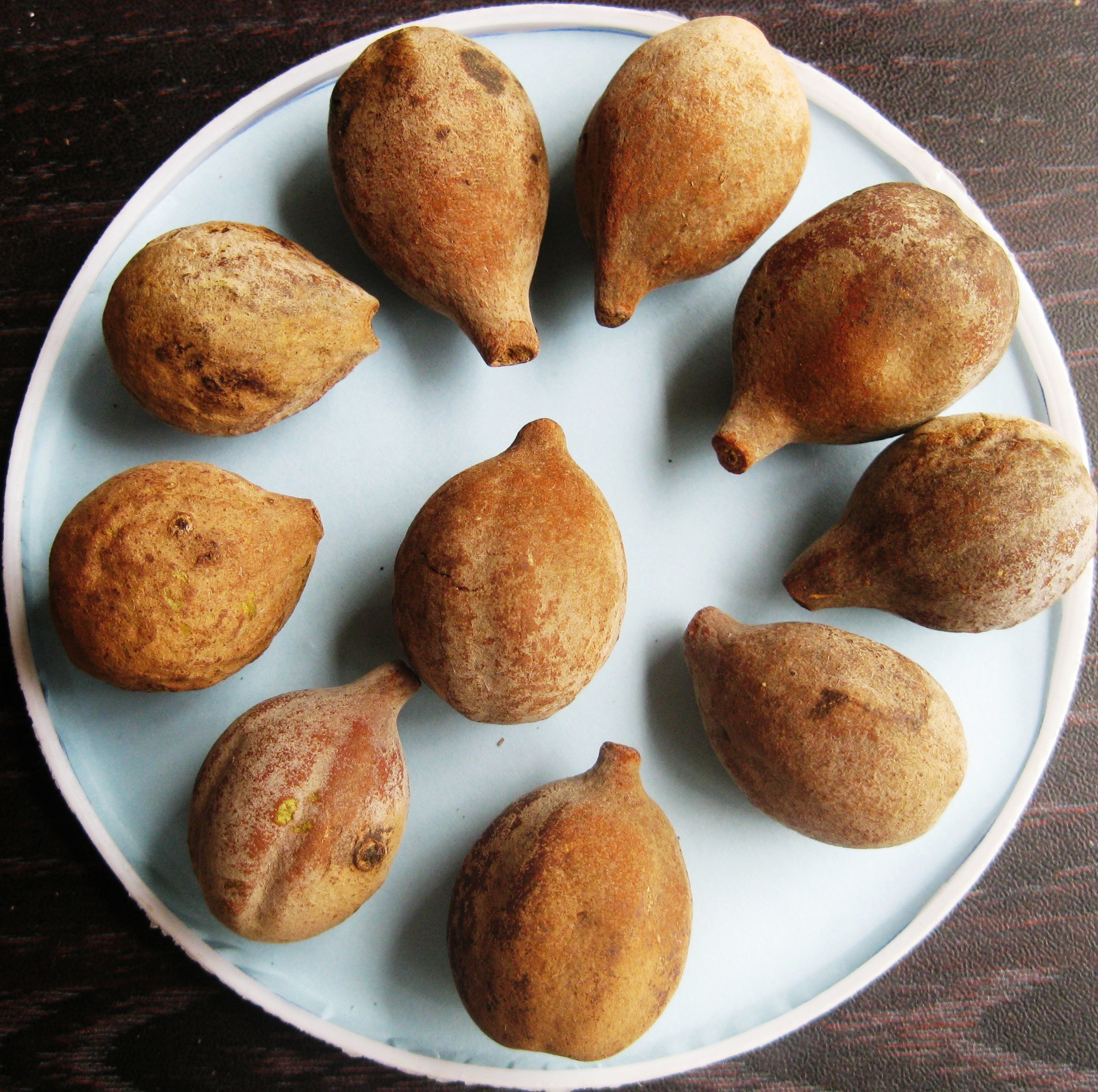
Bahera (Terminalia bellirica) fruits

The leaves are about 15 cm long and crowded toward the ends of the branches. It is considered a good fodder for cattle. Terminalia bellirica seeds have an oil content of 40%, whose fatty acid methyl ester meets all of the major biodiesel requirements in the US (ASTM D 6751-02, ASTM PS 121-99), Germany (DIN V 51606) and European Union (EN 14214). The seeds are called bedda nuts.

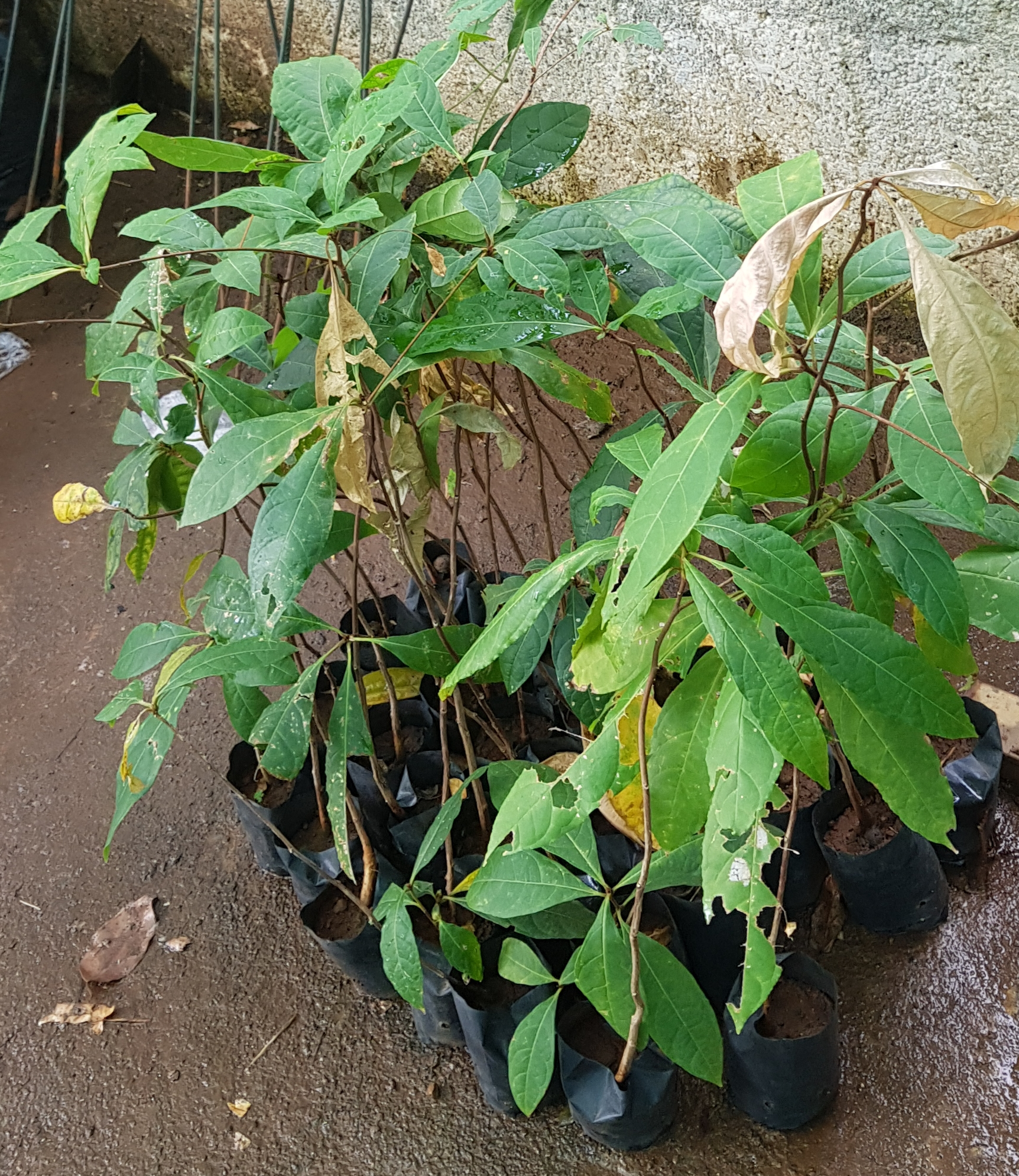
Terminalia bellirica saplings

The kernels are eaten by the Lodha people of the Indian subcontinent for their mind-altering qualities.

The nuts of the tree are rounded but with five flatter sides. It seems that are used as dice in the epic poem Mahabharata and in Rigveda book 10 hymn 34. A handful of nuts would be cast on a gaming board and the players would have to call whether an odd or even number of nuts had been thrown. In the Nala, King Rituparna demonstrates his ability to count large numbers instantaneously by counting the number of nuts on an entire bough of a tree.

== Medicinal use ==
In traditional Indian Ayurvedic medicine, beleric is known as "bibhitaki" (Marathi: "behada" or "bhenda") (Terminalia bellirica). Its fruit is used in the popular Indian herbal rasayana treatment triphala. In Sanskrit it is called bibhītaka बिभीतक. In India, Neemuch, a town in the Malwa region of Madhya Pradesh is a major trading centre of skinless baheda and entire fruits of T. bellirica. The fruits are widely collected in the wild in the Malwa region of Madhya Pradesh.

According to Dymock, Warden, Hooper: Pharmacographia Indica (1890):

This tree, in Sanskrit Bibhita and Bibhitaka (fearless), is avoided by the Hindus of Northern India, who will not sit in its shade, as it is supposed to be inhabited by demons. Two varieties of T. belerica are found in India, one with nearly globular fruit, 1/2 to 3/4 inch in diameter, the other with ovate and much larger fruit. The pulp of the fruit (Beleric myrobalan) is considered by ayurvedic physicians to be astringent and laxative, and is prescribed with salt and long pepper in infections of the throat and chest. As a constituent of the triphala (three fruits), i.e., emblic, beleric and chebulic myrobalans, it is employed in a great number of diseases, and the kernel is sometimes used as an external application to inflamed parts. On account of its medicinal properties the tree bears the Sanskrit synonym of Anila-ghnaka, or "wind-killing." According to the Nighantus the kernels are narcotic.

In the Charaka Samhita, the ancient Ayurvedic text, bibhitaki fruits are mentioned as having qualities to alleviate disease, and bestow longevity, intellectual prowess and strength. There are several "rasaayan" described in the Charaka Samhita, that use bibhitaki.

A description of the Fourth Amalaka Rasaayan, which includes bibhitaki as one of the fruits: "By this treatment, the sages regained youthfulness and attained disease-free life of many hundred years, and endowed with the strength of physique, intellect and senses, practiced penance with utmost devotion."

== Gallery ==
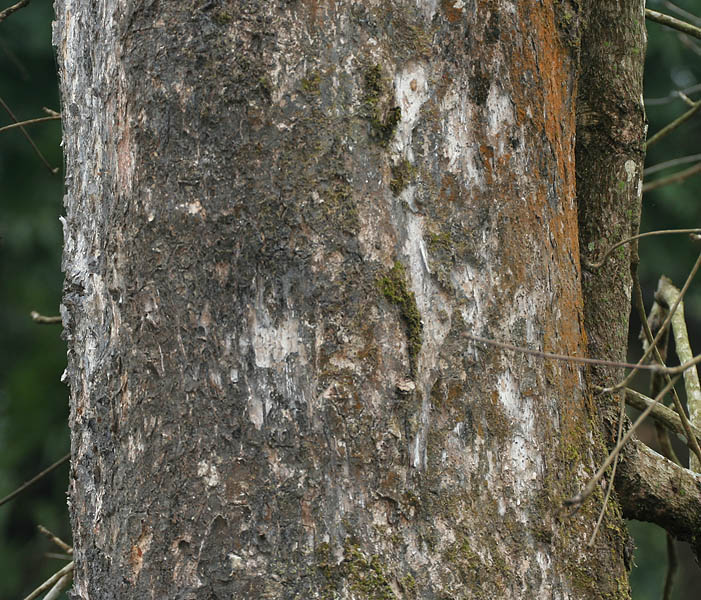
Trunk of T. bellirica

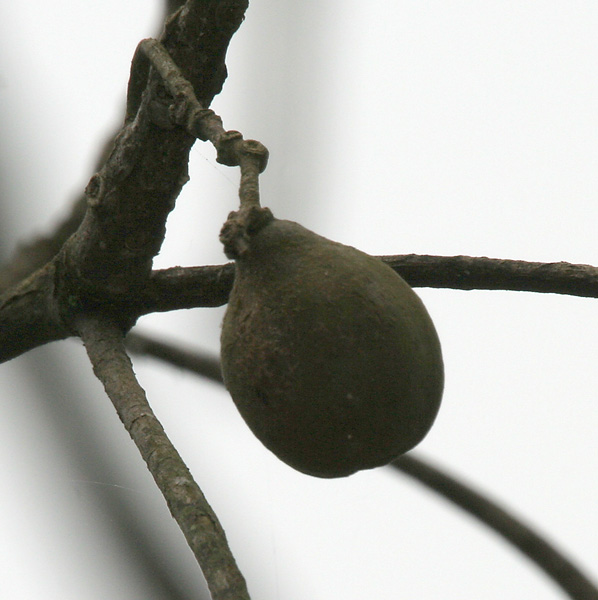
Fruit of T. bellirica

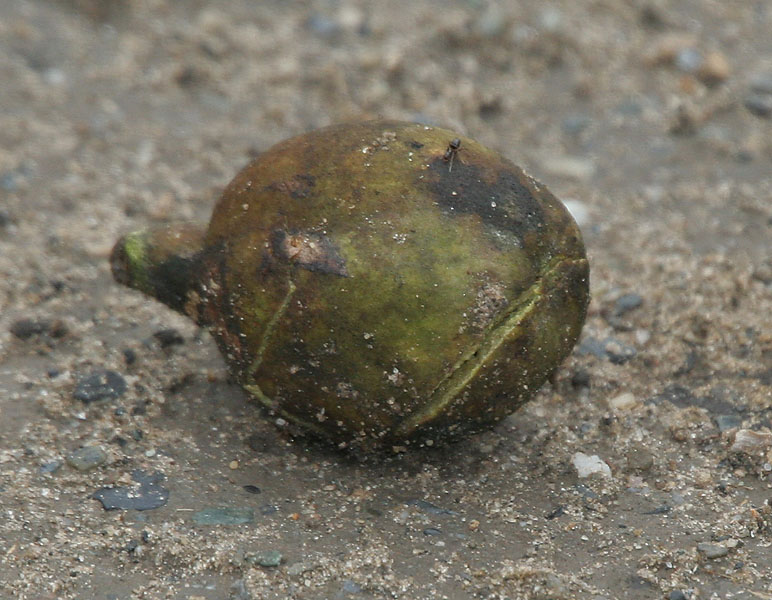
A fallen fruit

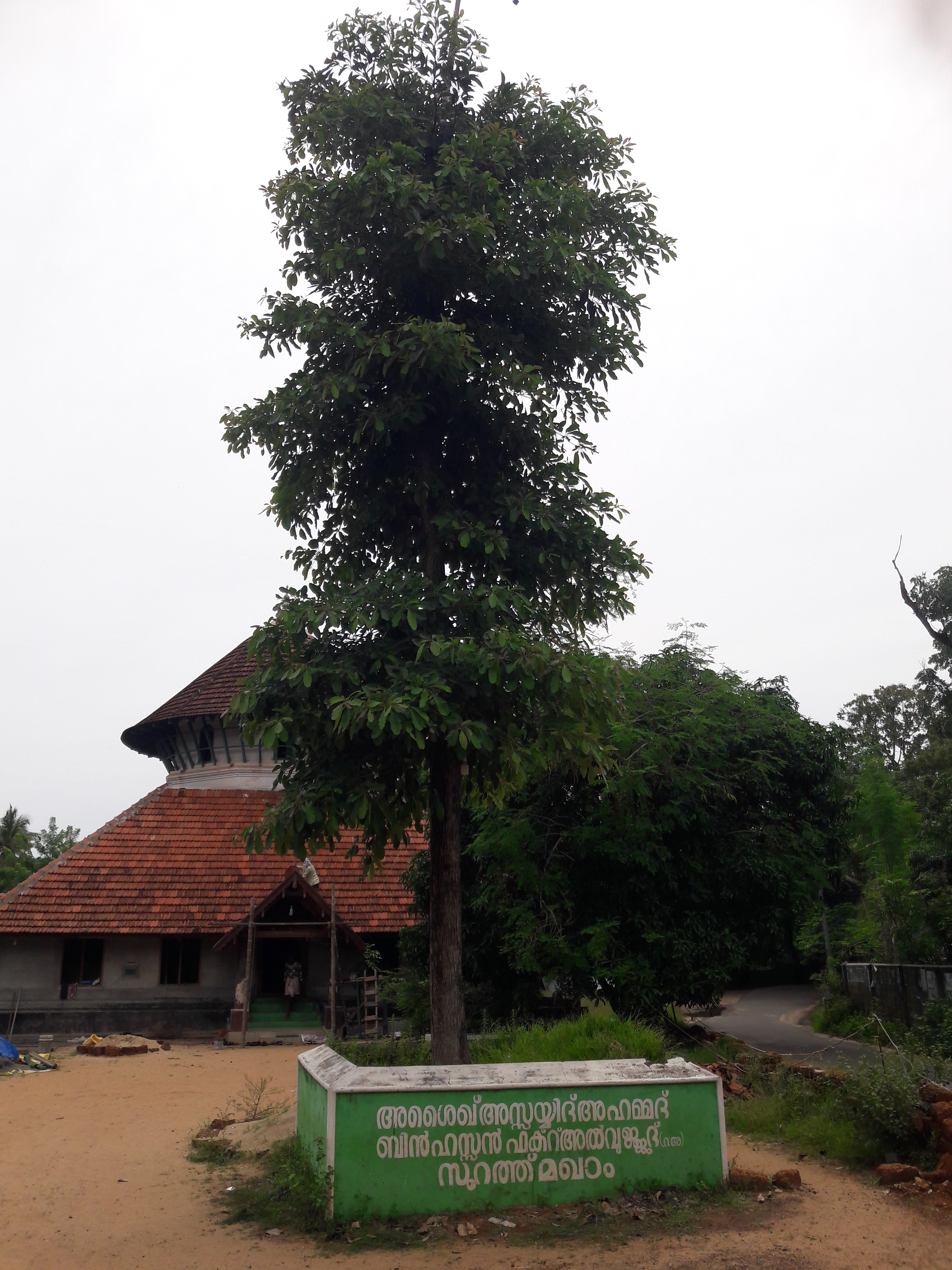
T. bellirica tree
