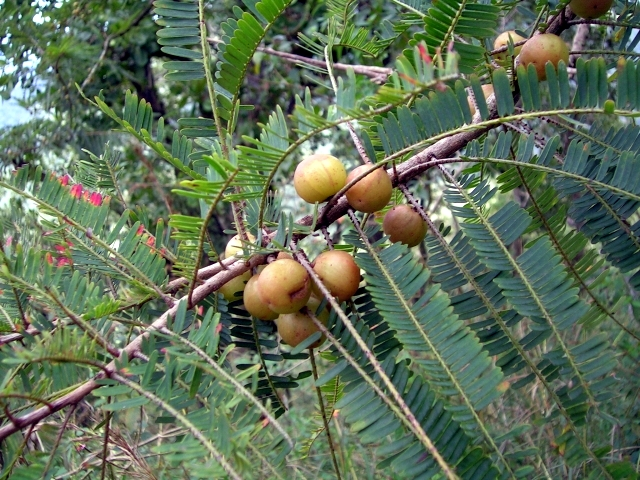
- Plant
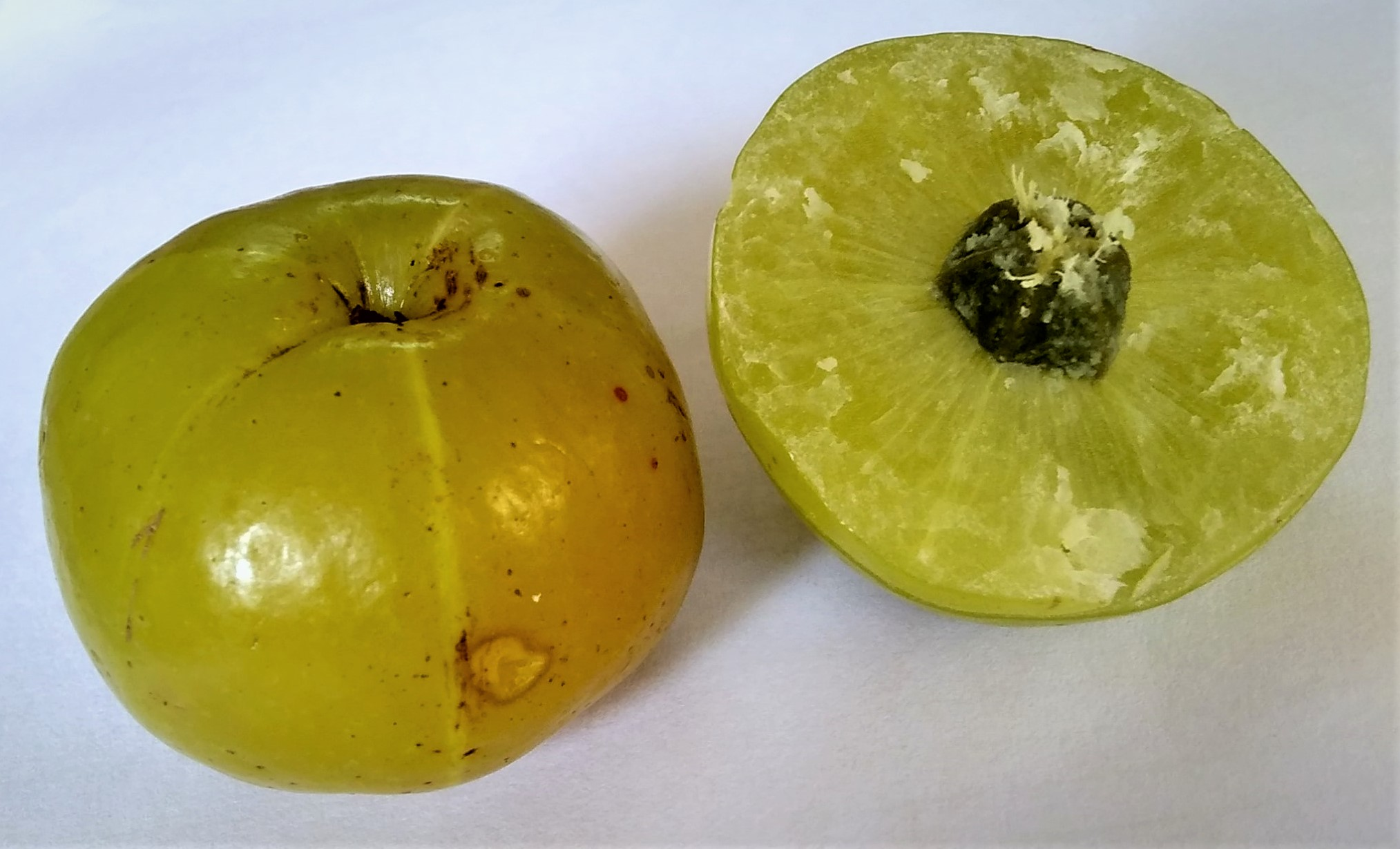
- Fruit, whole and halved

Conservation status
- Least Concern (IUCN 3.1)

Scientific classification
- Kingdom: Plantae
- Clade: Tracheophytes
- Clade: Angiosperms
- Clade: Eudicots
- Clade: Rosids
- Order: Malpighiales
- Family: Phyllanthaceae
- Genus: Phyllanthus
- Species: P. emblica

Binomial name
- Phyllanthus emblica L.

Synonyms
- Cicca emblica (L.) Kurz; Diasperus emblica (L.) Kuntze; Dichelactina nodicaulis Hance; Emblica arborea Raf.; Emblica officinalis Gaertn.; Phyllanthus glomeratus Roxb. ex Wall. nom. inval.; Phyllanthus mairei H.Lév.; Phyllanthus mimosifolius Salisb.; Phyllanthus taxifolius D.Don

= Phyllanthus emblica =

Berry and plant

Phyllanthus emblica, commonly known as emblic, Indian gooseberry, amalaki, amloki, or amla, is a deciduous tree of the family Phyllanthaceae. Its native range is tropical and southern Asia.

== Description ==
The tree is small to medium in size, reaching 1–8 metres (3 1/2–26 feet) in height. The bark is mottled. The branchlets are finely pubescent (not glabrous), 10–20 centimetres (4–8 inches) long, usually deciduous. March–April is the main blooming season. Grafted trees begin flowering in 3–4 years, while seed-grown trees may take 7–10 years. The leaves are simple, subsessile and closely set along branchlets, light green, resembling pinnate leaves. The flowers are greenish–yellow. The fruit is nearly spherical, light greenish–yellow, quite smooth and hard on appearance, with six vertical stripes or furrows. The fruit is up to 26 millimetres (1 in) in diameter, and, while the fruit of wild plants weigh approximately 5.5 grams (0.2 ounces), cultivated fruits average 28.4 g (1 oz) to 56 g (2 oz).

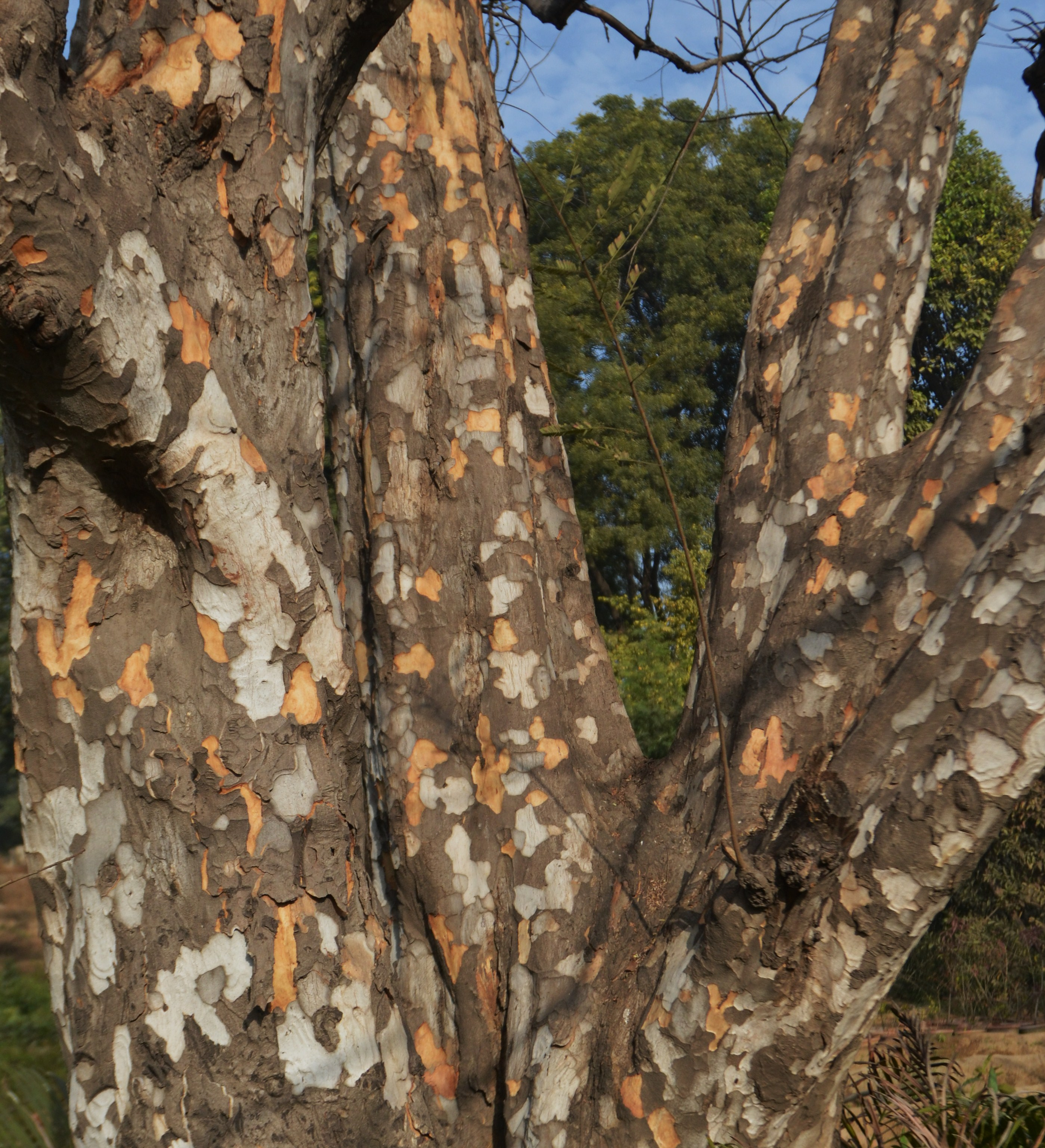
Trunk and main branches

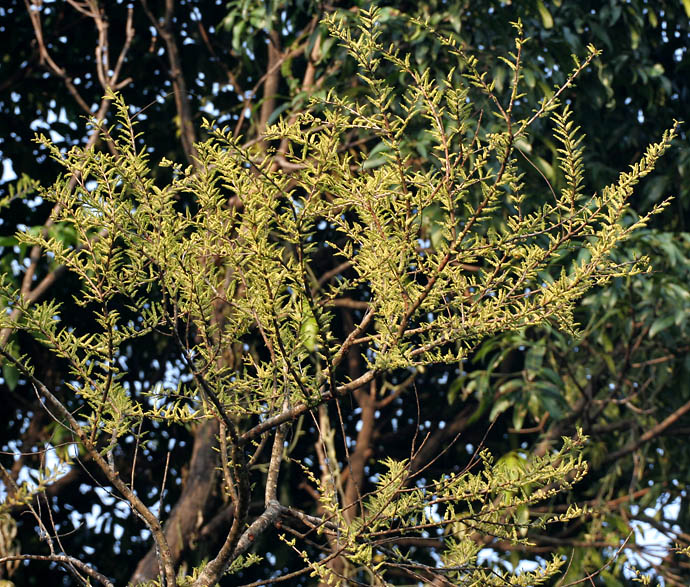
Leaves

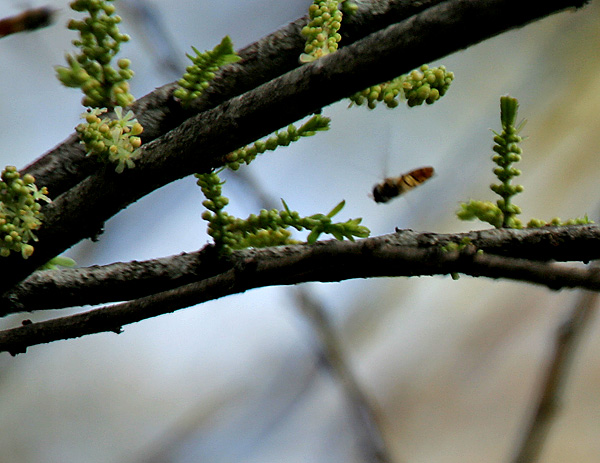
Budding and flowers

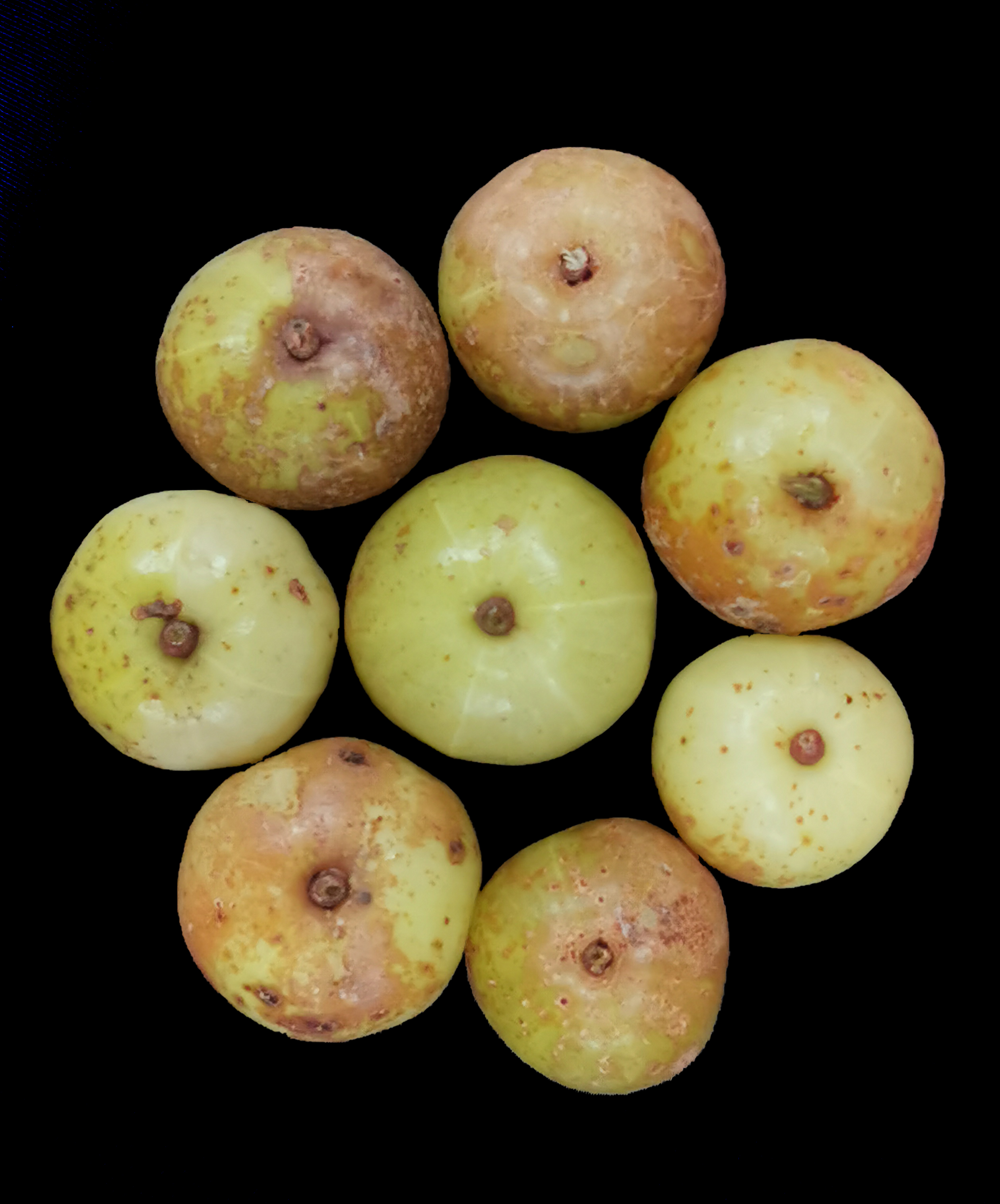
Fruits

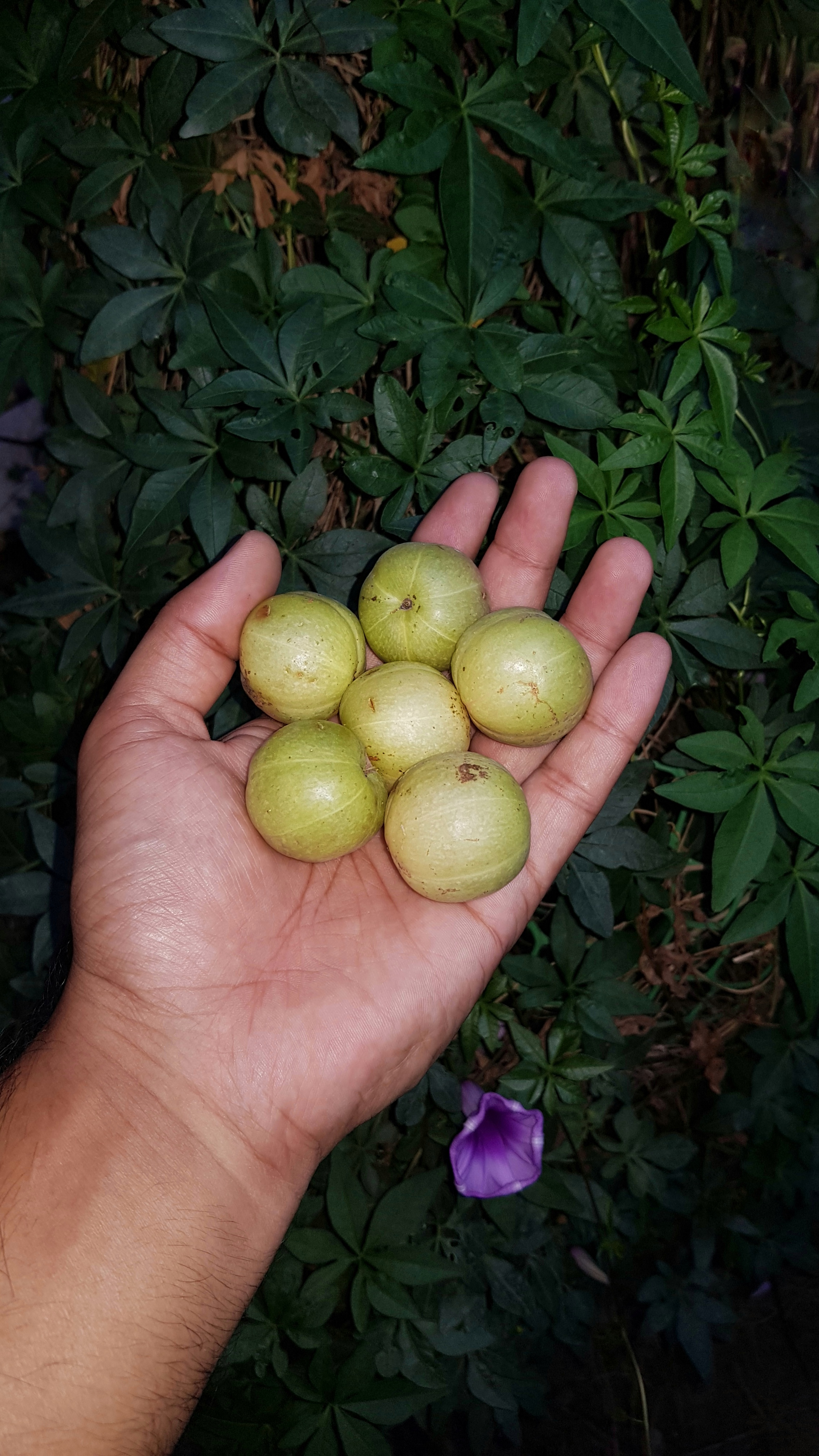
Fruit size comparison

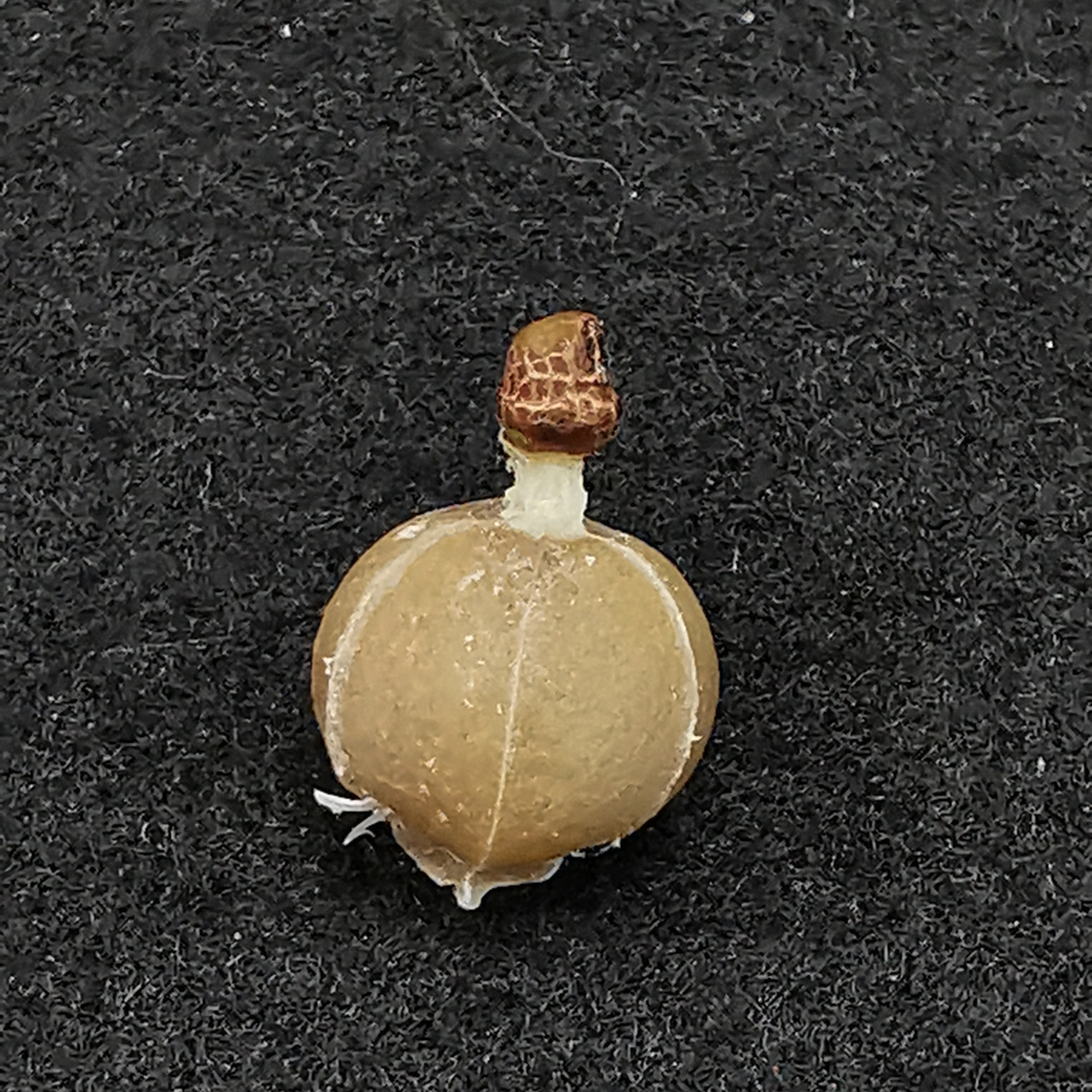
Seed close-up

=== Chemical constituents ===
The fruits contain high amounts of ascorbic acid (vitamin C), and have a bitter taste that may derive from a high density of ellagitannins, such as emblicanin A (37%), emblicanin B (33%), punigluconin (12%), and pedunculagin (14%). Emblic also contains punicafolin and phyllanemblinin A, phyllanemblin other polyphenols, such as flavonoids, kaempferol, ellagic acid, and gallic acid.

== Uses ==
Ripening in autumn, the berries are harvested by hand after climbing to upper branches bearing the fruits. The taste is sour, bitter and astringent, and it is quite fibrous.

=== Culinary ===
The emblic fruit may be eaten raw or cooked, and in South Asia, the fruit is often pickled with salt, oil, and spices. It is used as an ingredient in dishes including dal (a lentil preparation), and is also made into amle ka murabbah, a sweet dish made by soaking the berries in sugar syrup until they are candied. It is traditionally consumed after meals.

In the Batak area of Sumatra, Indonesia, the inner bark is used to impart an astringent, bitter taste to the broth of a traditional fish soup known as holat.

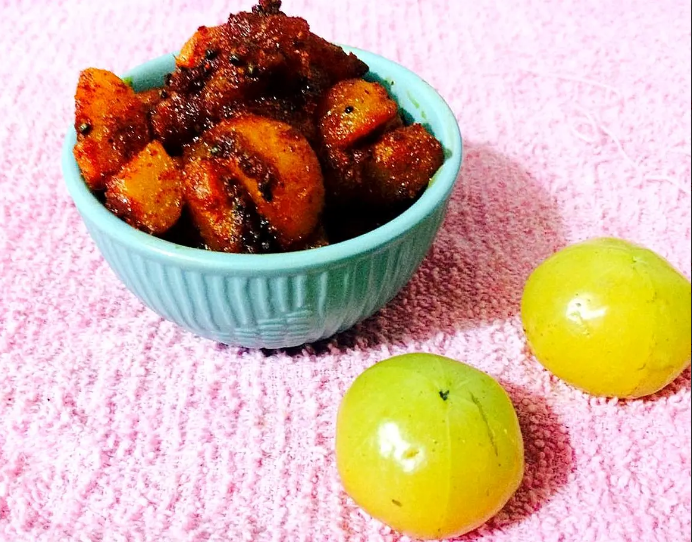
Emblic pickle

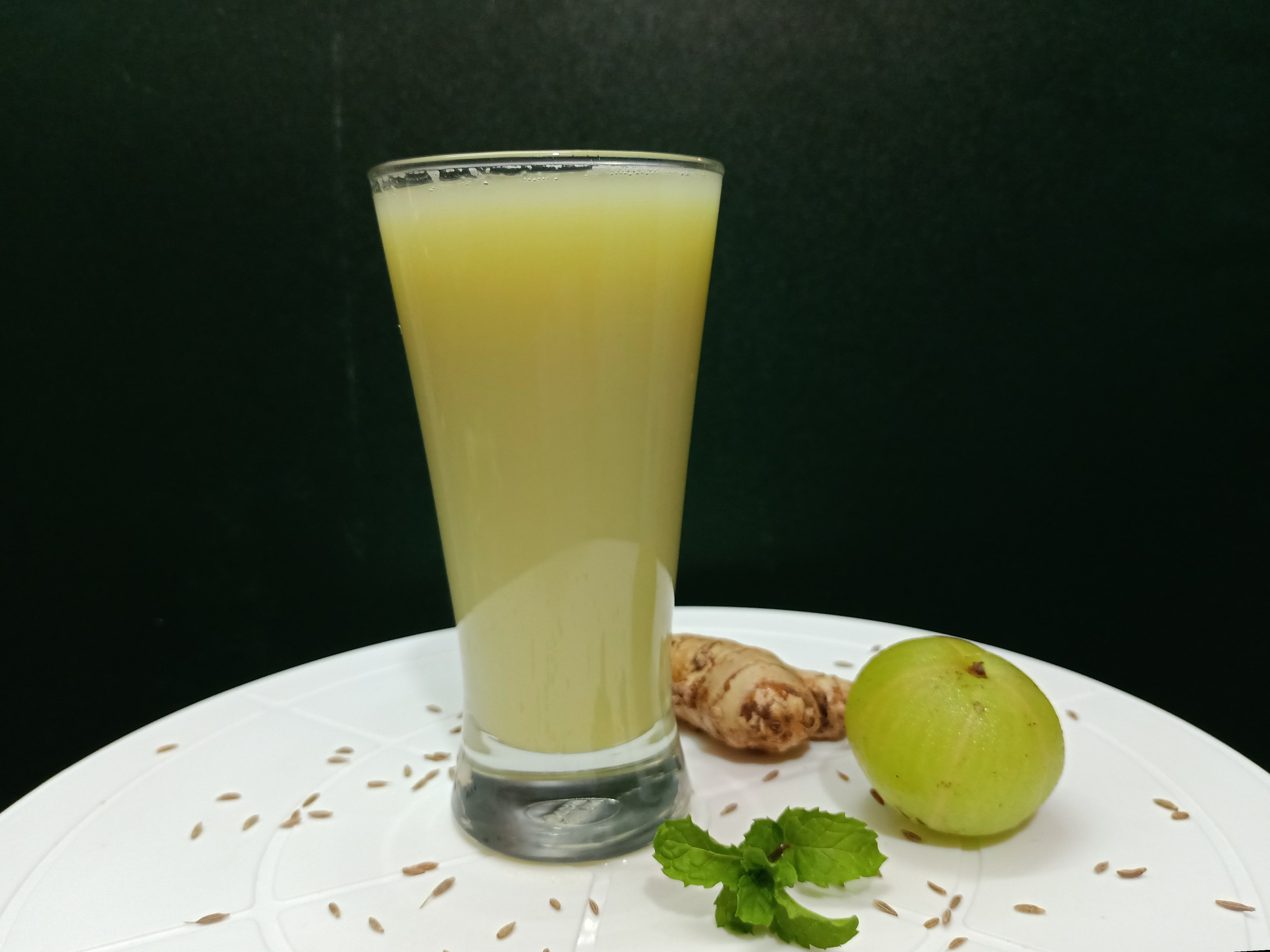
Emblic juice

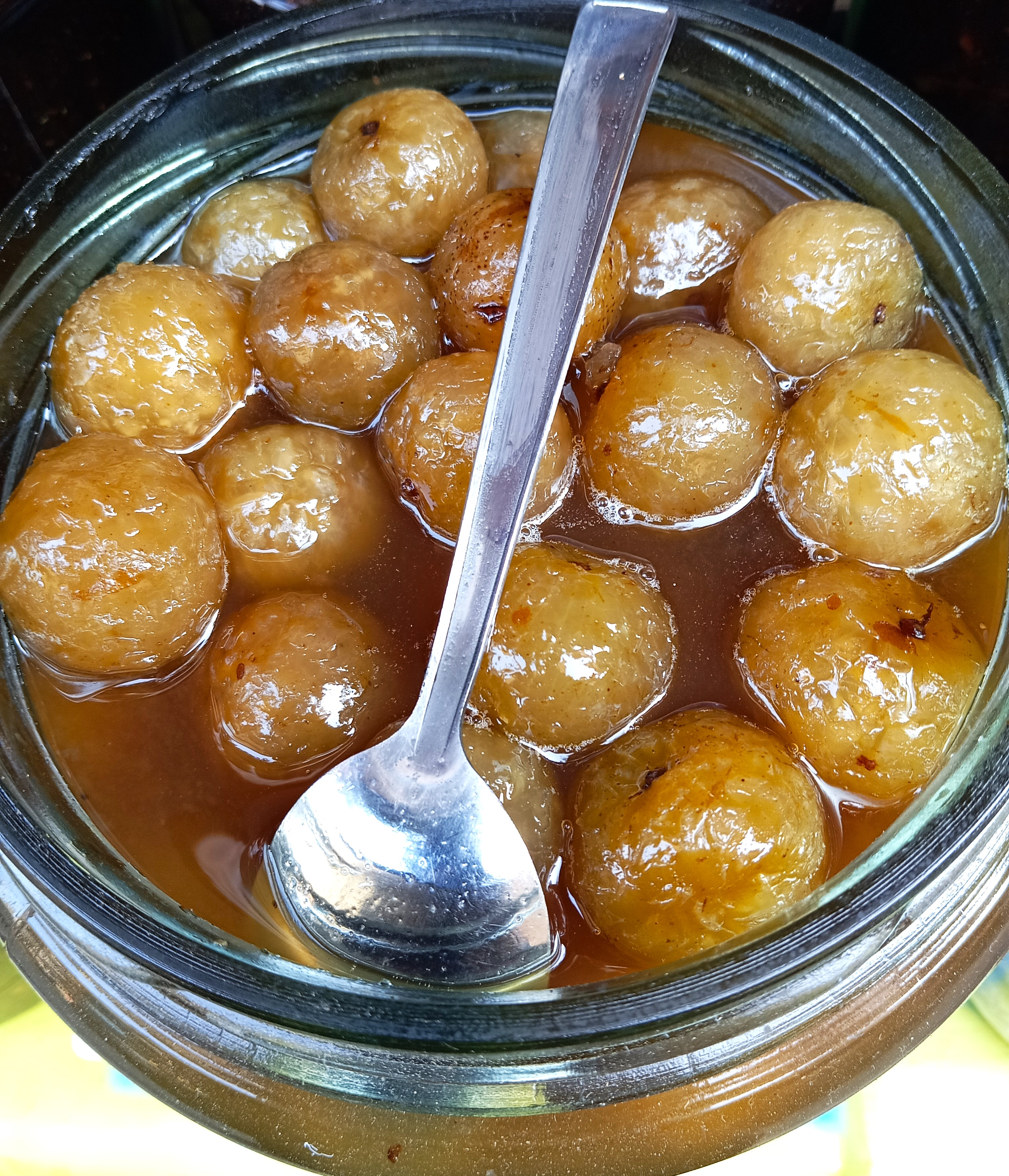
Emblic murabba

=== Traditional medicine ===
In Ayurveda, dried and fresh fruits of the plant are used as a common constituent.

== In culture ==
In the Buddhist tradition there are many references to the emblic fruit. In the Śatapañcāśatka, Buddha's knowledge is described in a poetic simile: "O Bhagavan, the entire origination of all types of phenomena throughout time is within the range of your mind, like an ambalan fruit in the palm of your hand".

Half an emblic fruit was the final gift to the Buddhist sangha by the great Indian emperor Ashoka. This is illustrated in the Ashokavadana in the following verses: "A great donor, the lord of men, the eminent Maurya Ashoka, has gone from being lord of Jambudvipa [the continent] to being lord of half a myrobalan". In Theravada Buddhism, this plant is said to have been used as the tree for achieving enlightenment, or Bodhi, by the twenty-first Buddha, named Phussa Buddha.

In Hinduism, the emblic, called the āmalaka in Sanskrit, is sacred to all three members of the Trimurti, the Hindu supreme trinity of Brahma, Vishnu, and Shiva. According to legend, during a religious gathering, Lakshmi, Vishnu's consort, expressed a desire to worship Shiva, while Parvati, Shiva's consort, wished to worship Vishnu. Moved by each other's piety, they shed tears upon the earth, from which emerged the first emblic trees. The Amalaka Ekadashi is a Hindu occasion dedicated to Vishnu, venerating the emblic.

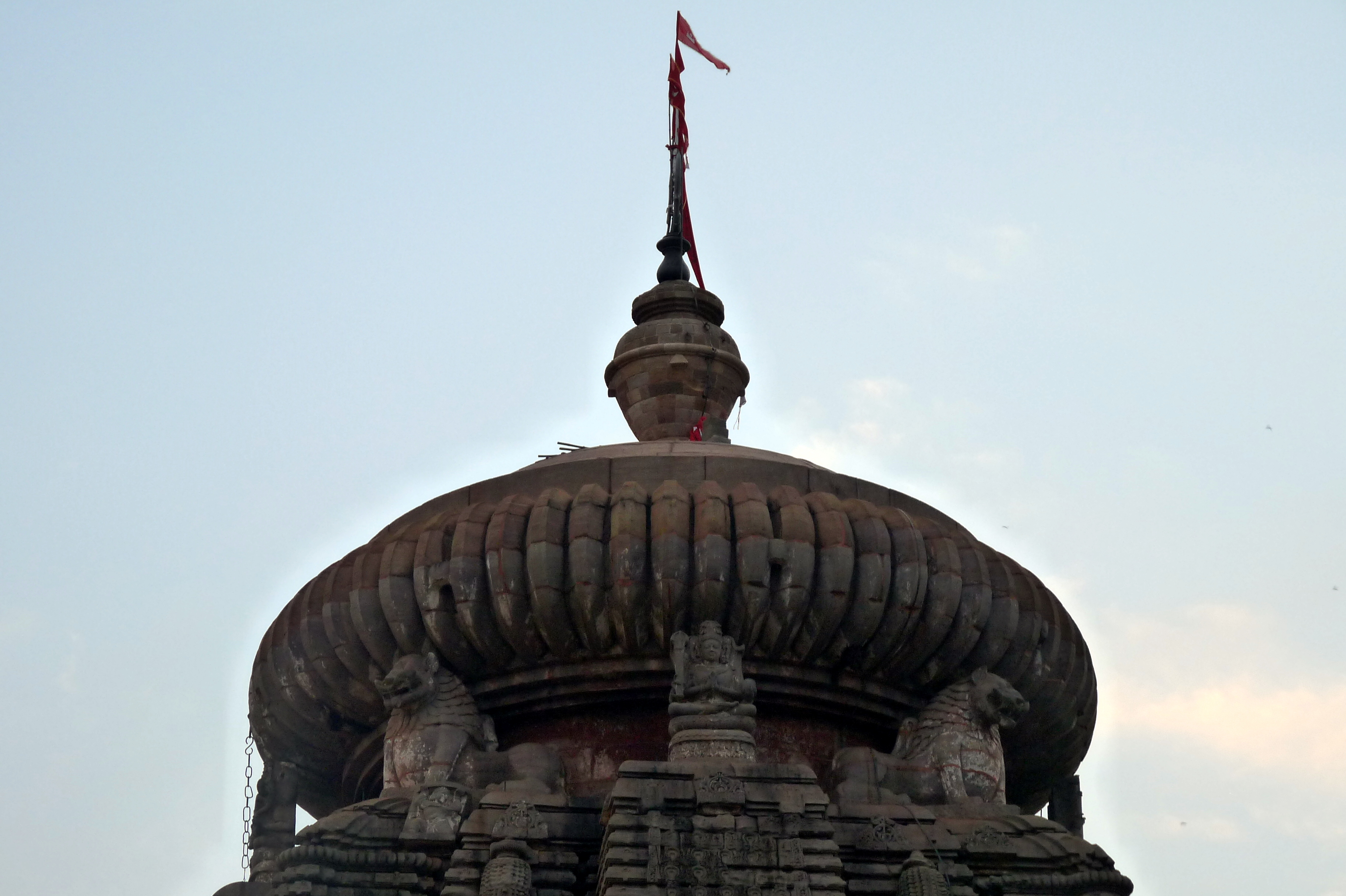
Amalaka at the top of the Lingaraj temple in Bhubaneswar

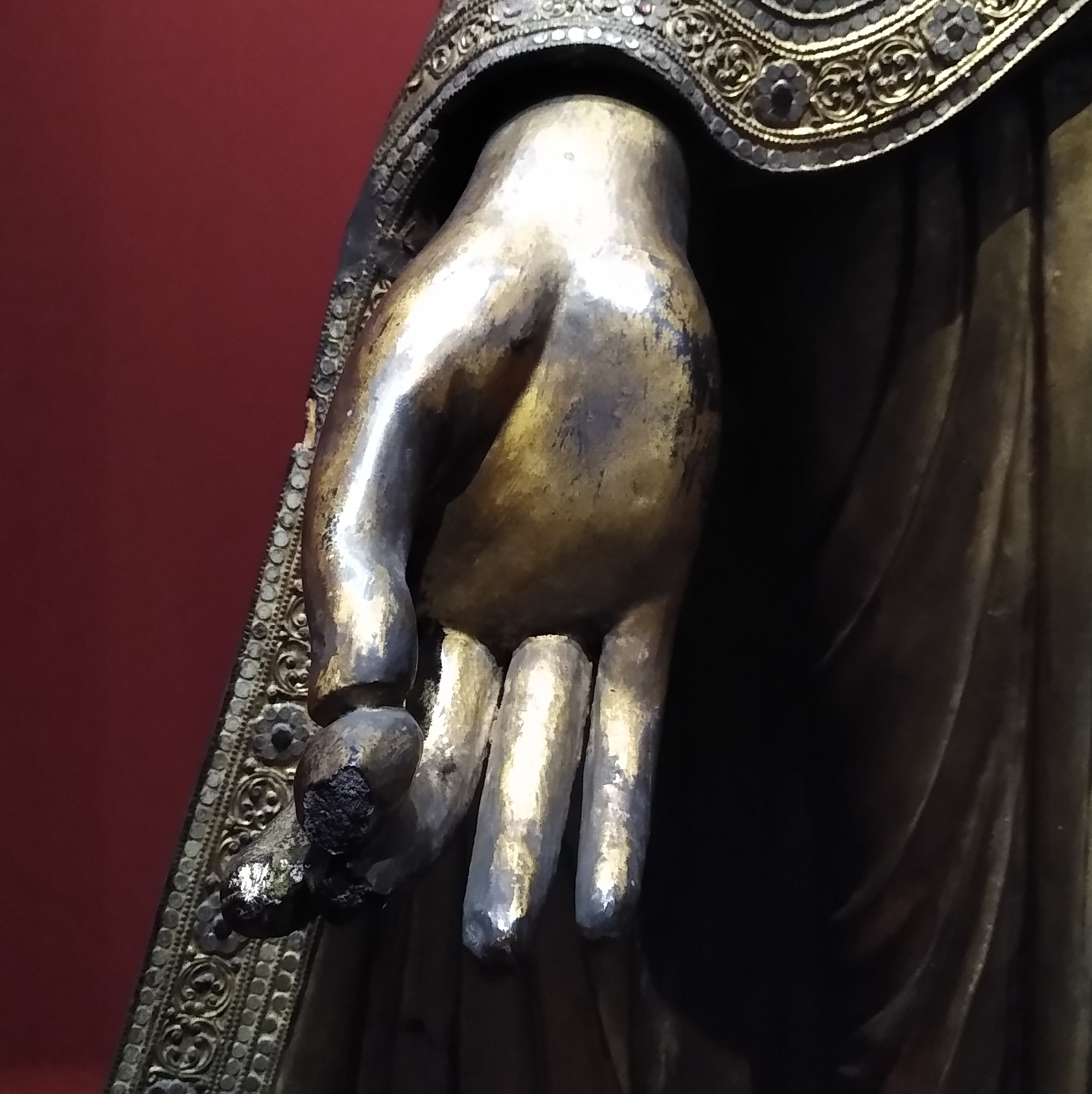
Hand of a standing Buddha statue holding an emblic fruit

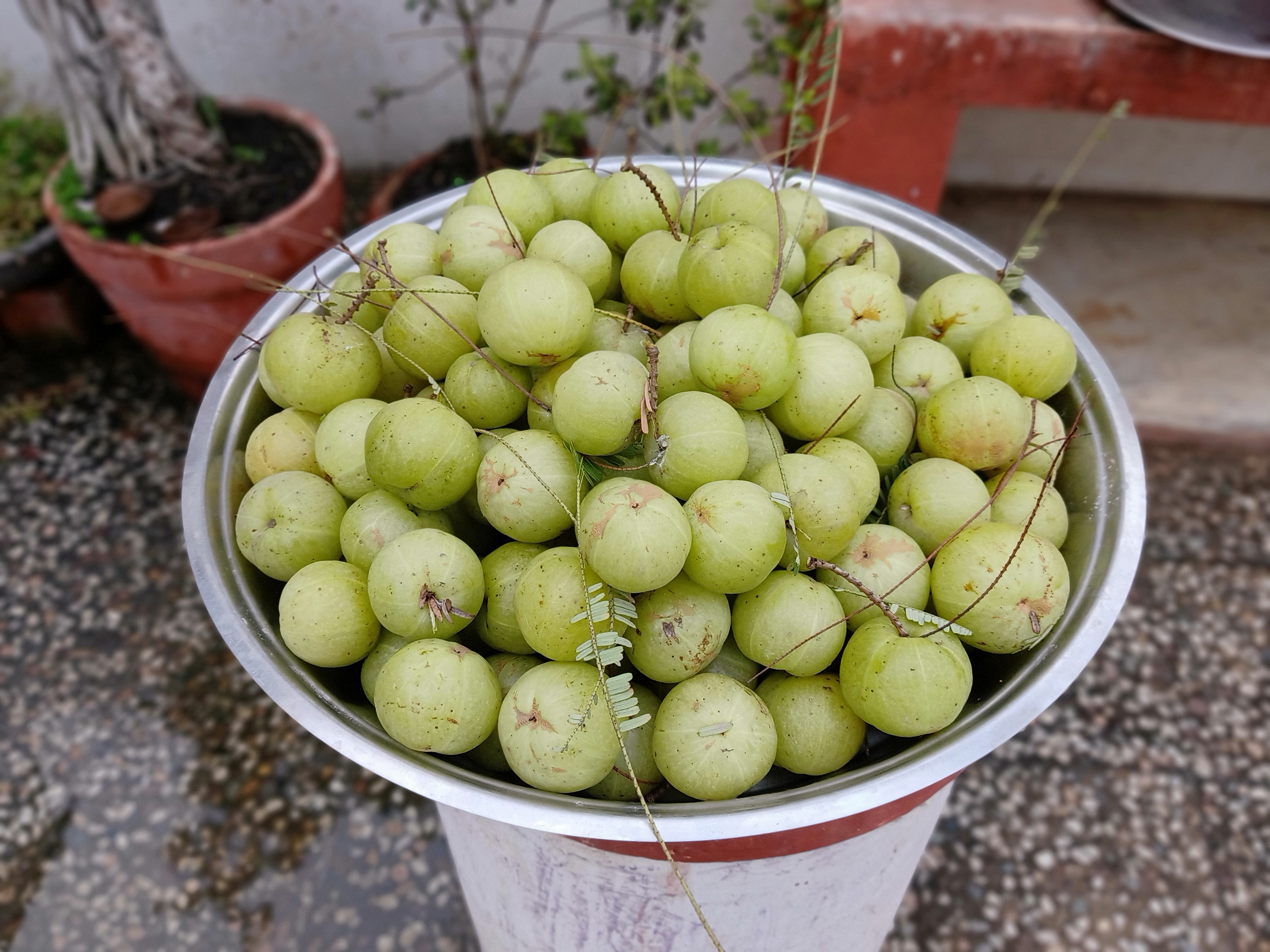
Emblic fruits in Bhopal, Madhya Pradesh

== See also ==
- Emblicanin
- Triphala, an Ayurvedic mixture containing emblic.
