= Chebulagic acid =

Identifiers
CAS Number	23094-71-5
3D model (JSmol)	Interactive image
ChEBI	CHEBI:3583
ChEMBL	ChEMBL525240
ChemSpider	391031
KEGG	C10214
PubChem CID	442674
UNII	JW8L3F5IW9
- InChI: InChI=1S/C41H30O27/c42-13-1-8(2-14(43)24(13)49)35(56)68-41-34-33-31(64-39(60)12(6-19(47)48)22-23-11(38(59)67-34)5-17(46)27(52)32(23)65-40(61)30(22)55)18(63-41)7-62-36(57)9-3-15(44)25(50)28(53)20(9)21-10(37(58)66-33) 4-16(45)26(51)29(21)54/h1-5,12,18,22,30-31,33-34,41-46,49-55H,6-7H2,(H,47,48)/t12-,18+,22-,30-,31+,33-,34+,41-/m0/s1 Key: HGJXAVROWQLCTP-YABCKIEDSA-N
- SMILES: C1C2C3C(C(C(O2)OC(=O)C4=CC(=C(C(=C4)O)O)O)OC(=O)C5=CC(=C(C6=C5C(C(C(=O)O3)CC(=O)O)C(C(=O)O6)O)O)O)OC(=O)C7=CC(=C(C(=C7C8=C(C(=C(C=C8C(=O)O1)O)O)O)O)O)O

Properties
Chemical formula	C_{41}H_{30}O_{27}
Molar mass	954.66 g/mol
- Except where otherwise noted, data are given for materials in their standard state (at 25 °C [77 °F], 100 kPa). verify (what is ?) Infobox references

Chebulagic acid is a benzopyran tannin and an antioxidant that has many potential uses in medicine.

It has been found to be immunosuppressive, hepatoprotective, and a potent alpha-glucosidase inhibitor, a human gut enzyme useful in diabetic studies.

It has been shown to be active against Staphylococcus aureus and Candida albicans.

It is found in the plants Terminalia chebula, T. citrina and T. catappa.

It is formed from geraniin through a glutathione-mediated conversion.
