= Han E (scholar) =

- Traditional Chinese: 韓鄂 韓諤
- Simplified Chinese: 韩鄂 韓諤
Transcriptions
Standard Mandarin
- Hanyu Pinyin: Hán È
- Wade–Giles: Han O

Han E (fl. AD 750 or 875) was a Tang-era scholar-official. A distant relative of Han Xiu, he is chiefly remembered as the author of the Summary of the Four Seasons.

== Works ==
Han is chiefly remembered as the author of the Summary of the Four Seasons (《四時纂要》, Sì Shí Zuǎnyào), five scrolls in length. Only a small part of the work seems to have been lost, while a few passages seem to be later insertions.

The work covers important rules for various daily, agricultural, and superstitious activities to perform throughout the year such as performing mouse and rat exorcisms on expulsion days (禳鼠日, rángshǔ rì) in the 1st lunar month. It also covers the basics of marketing agricultural products, homeschooling, disaster relief, and simple pharmacology.

The Summary was omitted from the imperial bibliography of the Old Book of Tang but included in the Song-era revision and subsequent works. It was first published in 996 but then lost for centuries until a 1590 Korean reprint was discovered in Japan in 1960. Miao Qiyu (繆啟愉; 1910–2003) compiled annotations and commentary on the Summary, published in 1981 (《四時纂要校釋》, Sì Shí Zuǎnyào Xiàoshì).
