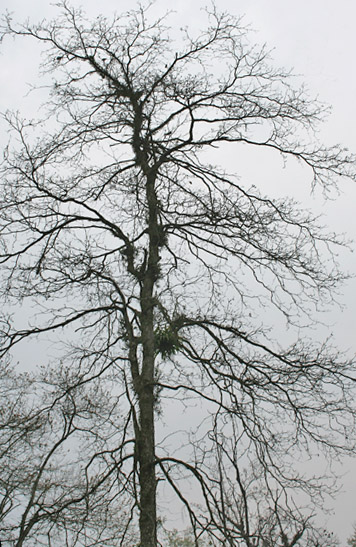
- A leafless T. chebula tree

Scientific classification
- Kingdom: Plantae
- Clade: Tracheophytes
- Clade: Angiosperms
- Clade: Eudicots
- Clade: Rosids
- Order: Myrtales
- Family: Combretaceae
- Genus: Terminalia
- Species: T. chebula

Binomial name
- Terminalia chebula Retz.

Synonyms
- Buceras chebula (Retz.) Lyons; Combretum argyrophyllum K.Schum.; Myrobalanus chebula (Retz.) Gaertn.; Myrobalanus gangetica (Roxb.) Kostel.; Myrobalanus tomentella Kuntze; Terminalia acutae Walp.; Terminalia argyrophylla King & Prain; Terminalia gangetica Roxb.; Terminalia glandulipetiolata De Wild.; Terminalia parviflora Thwaites; Terminalia reticulata Roth; Terminalia tomentella Kurz; Terminalia zeylanica Van Heurck & Müll. Arg.

= Terminalia chebula =

Species of flowering plant

Terminalia chebula, commonly known as black- or chebulic myrobalan, is a species of Terminalia, native to South Asia from India, Pakistan and Nepal east to southwest China (Yunnan), and south to Sri Lanka, Malaysia, and Vietnam. It is also known as "Haritaki".

== Taxonomy ==
Swedish naturalist Anders Jahan Retzius described the species in Observ. Bot. 5: 31 in 1788.

Many varieties are known, such as:

- T. c. var. chebula – leaves and shoots hairless, or only hairy when very young
- T. c. var. tomentella – leaves and shoots silvery to orange hairy

== Description ==
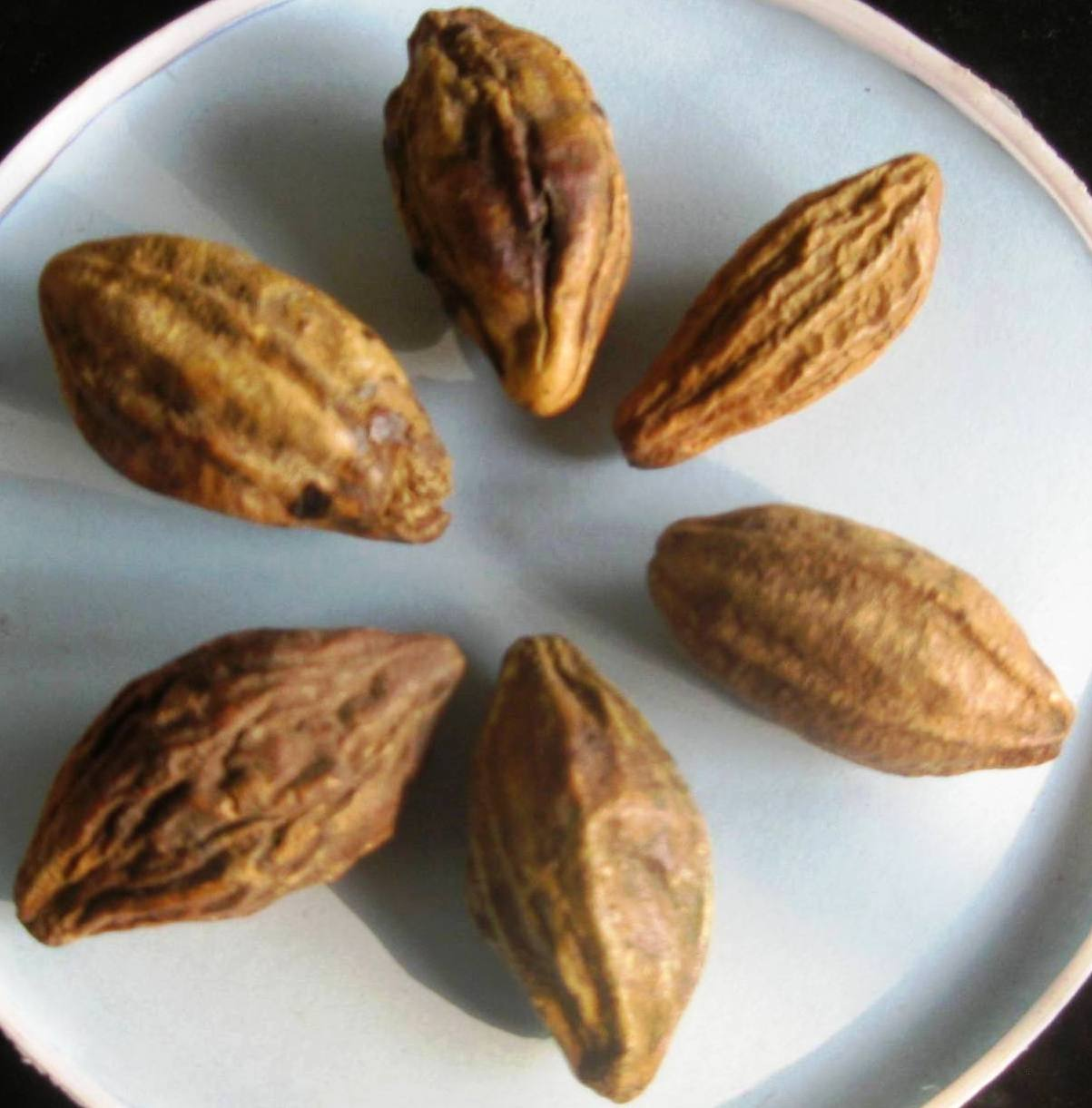
Haritaki (Terminalia chebula) fruits

Terminalia chebula is a medium to large deciduous tree growing to 30 m (98 ft) tall, with a trunk up to 1 m (3 ft 3 in) in diameter. The leaves are alternate to subopposite in arrangement, oval, 7–8 cm (2.8–3.1 in) long and 4.5–10 cm (1.8–3.9 in) broad with a 1–3 cm (0.39–1.18 in) petiole. They have an acute tip, cordate at the base, margins entire, glabrous above with a yellowish pubescence below. The dull white to yellow flowers are monoecious, and have a strong, unpleasant odour. They are borne in terminal spikes or short panicles. The fruit is drupe-like, smooth ellipsoid to ovoid, 2–4.5 cm (0.79–1.77 in) long and 1.2–2.5 cm (0.47–0.98 in) broad, blackish, with five longitudinal ridges. They are yellow to orange-brown in colour, with a single angled stone.

== Distribution and habitat ==
Terminalia chebula Is found throughout southern and southeast Asia including in India, Sri Lanka, Bhutan, Nepal, Bangladesh, Myanmar, Cambodia, Laos, Vietnam, Indonesia, Malaysia, Pakistan and Thailand. In China, it is native in western Yunnan and cultivated in Fujian, Guangdong, Guangxi (Nanning), and Taiwan (Nantou).

In India, it is found in the sub Himalayan region from Ravi, eastwards to western Bengal and Assam, ascending up to an altitude of 1,500 m (5,000 ft) in the Himalayas. This tree is wild in forests of northern India, central provinces and Bengal, common in Tamil Nadu, Karnataka and Maharashtra.

Its habitat includes dry slopes up to 900 m (3,000 ft) in elevation.

== Cultivation and uses ==
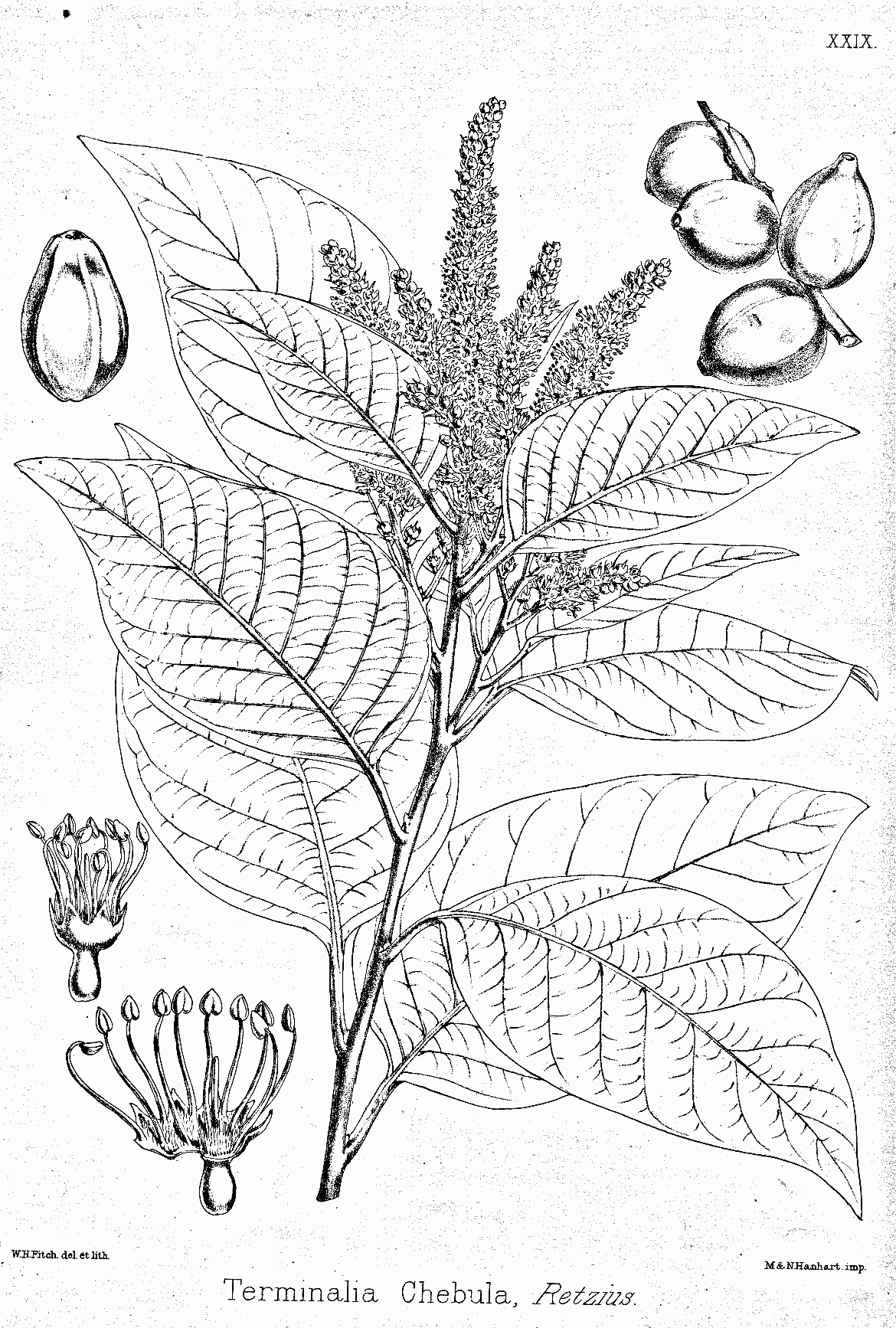
T. chebula

This tree yields smallish, ribbed and nut-like fruits which are picked when still green and then pickled, boiled with a little added sugar in their own syrup or used in preserves. The seed of the fruit, which has an elliptical shape, is an abrasive seed enveloped by a fleshy and firm pulp. Seven types of fruit are recognized (vijaya, rohini, putana, amrita, abhaya, jivanti, and chetaki), based on the region where the fruit is harvested, as well as the colour and shape of the fruit. Generally speaking, the vijaya variety is preferred, which is traditionally grown in the Vindhya Range of west-central India, and has a roundish as opposed to a more angular shape. The fruit also provides material for tanning leather and dyeing cloth.

Terminalia chebula (called Haritaki) is a main ingredient in the Ayurvedic formulation of triphala.

Kakatiya dynasty-era ‘sandbox’ technique of laying foundation to make a building earthquake-resistant. The technique involved filling the pit — dug up for laying foundation — with a mixture of sand lime, jaggery (for binding) and karakkaya (black myrobalan fruit), before the buildings were constructed on these ‘sandboxes(https://www.newindianexpress.com/cities/hyderabad/2018/Oct/25/did-kakatiya-rulers-hold-the-secret-to-earthquake-proof-buildings-1889809.html)

== Chemical composition ==
A number of glycosides have been isolated from haritaki, including the triterpenes arjunglucoside I, arjungenin, and the chebulosides I and II. Other constituents include a coumarin conjugated with gallic acids called chebulin, as well as other phenolic compounds including ellagic acid, 2,4-chebulyl-β-D-glucopyranose, chebulinic acid, gallic acid, ethyl gallate, punicalagin, terflavin A, terchebin, luteolin, and tannic acid. Chebulic acid is a phenolic acid compound isolated from the ripe fruits. Luteic acid can be isolated from the bark.

Terminalia chebula also contains terflavin B, a type of tannin, while chebulinic acid is found in the fruits.

The fruit extracts of Terminalia chebula also have antibacterial activity.

== Gallery ==
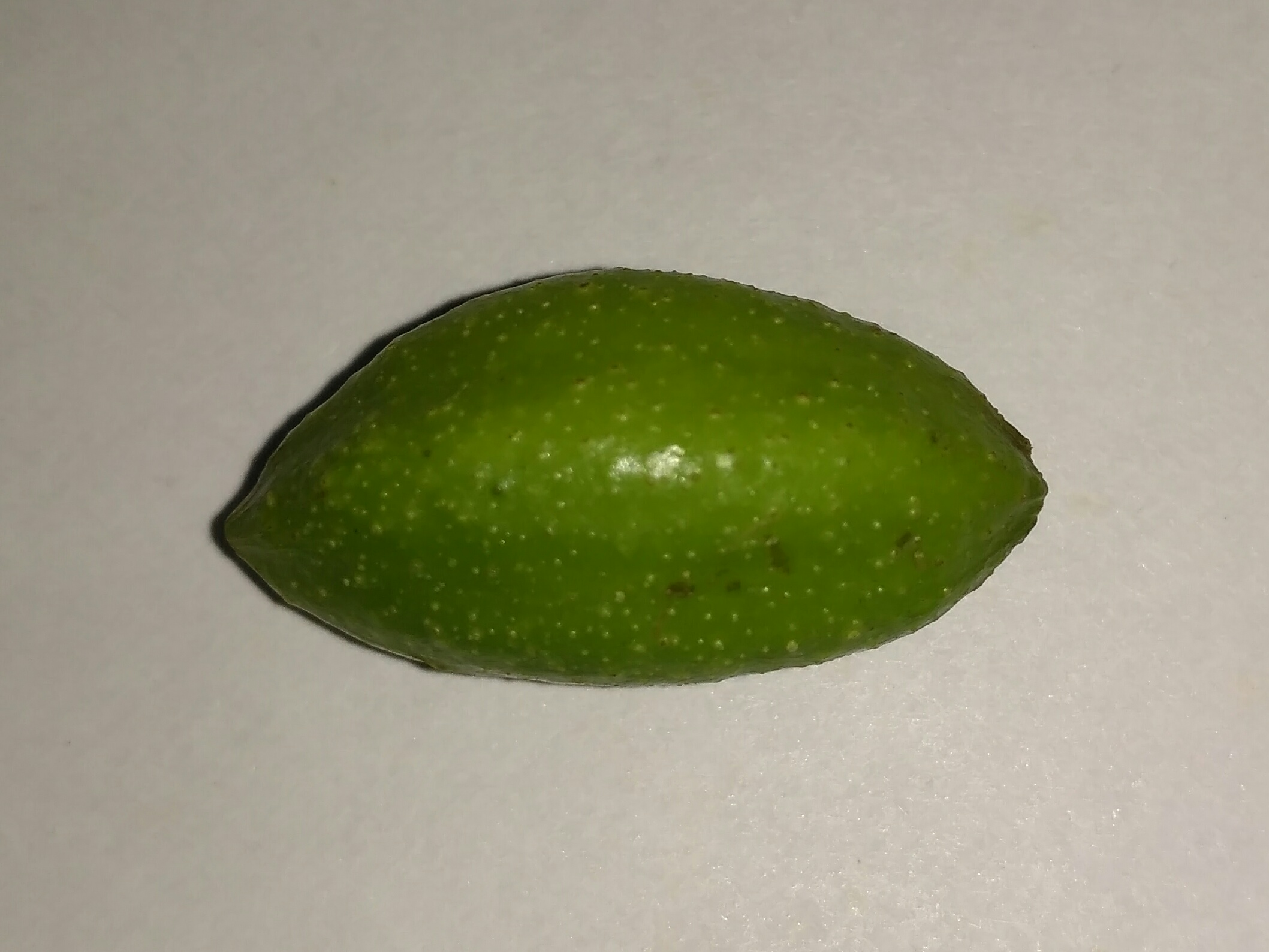
A green fruit

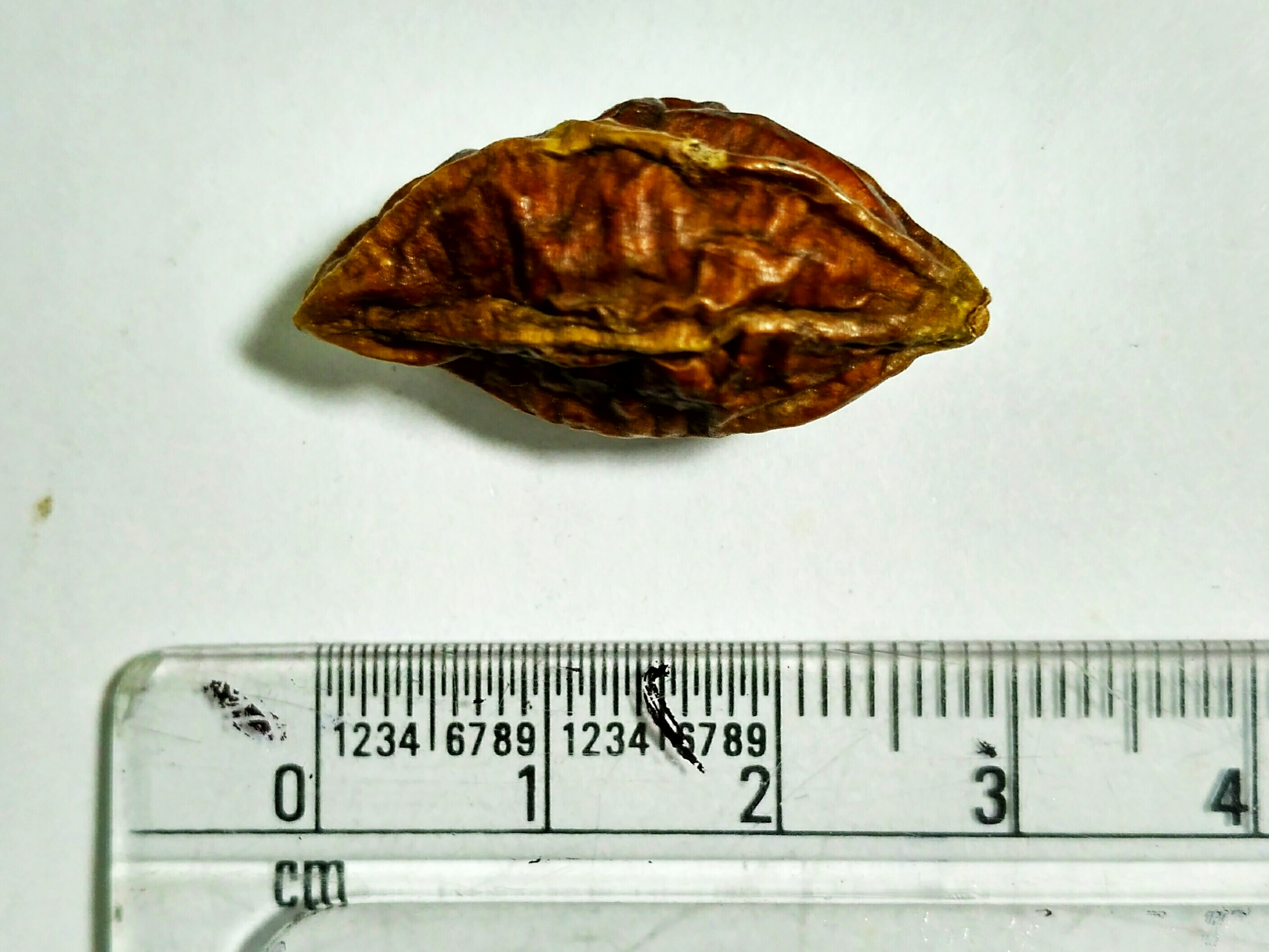
A dried T. chebula by the side of a scale

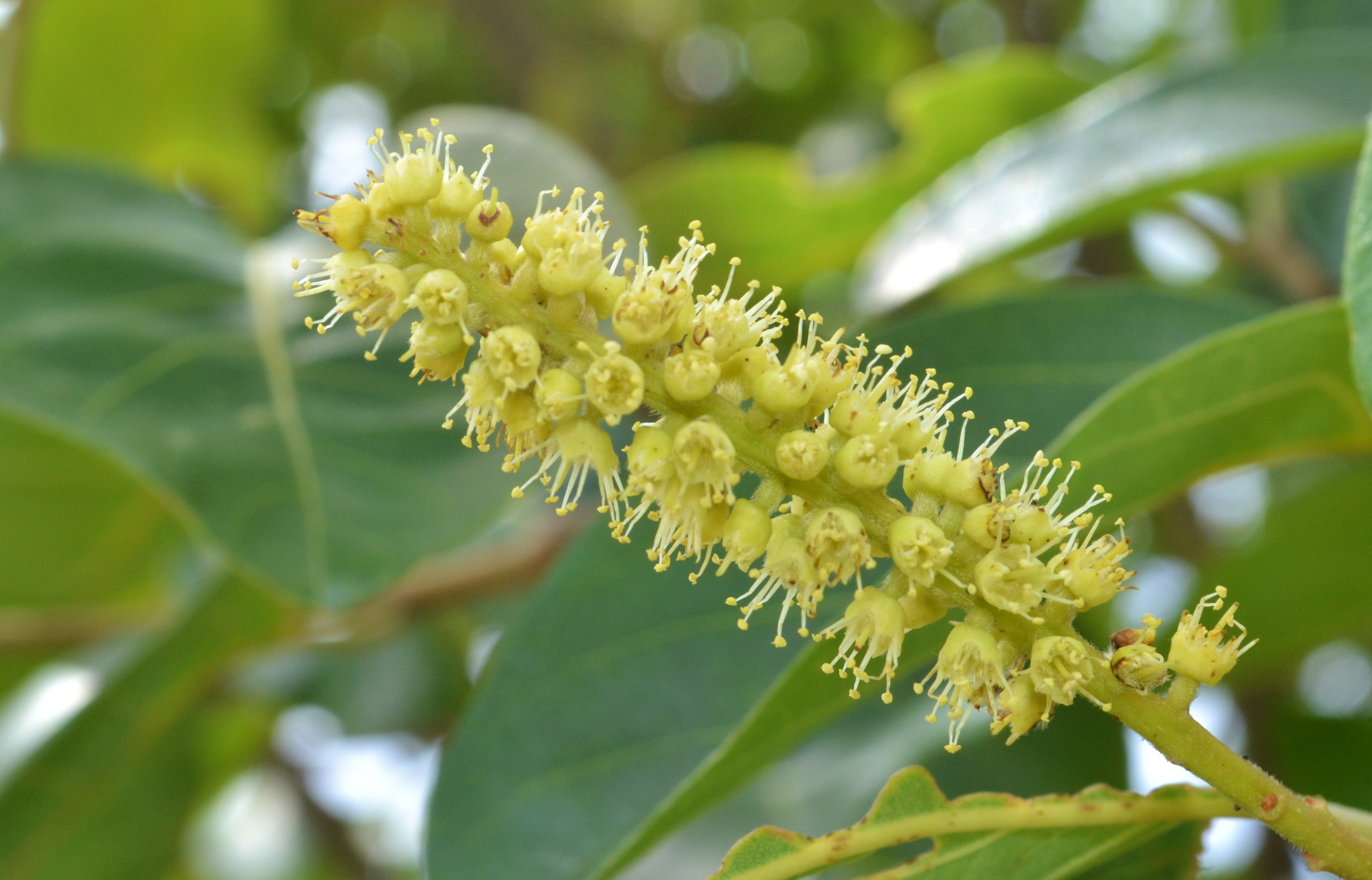
Flowers

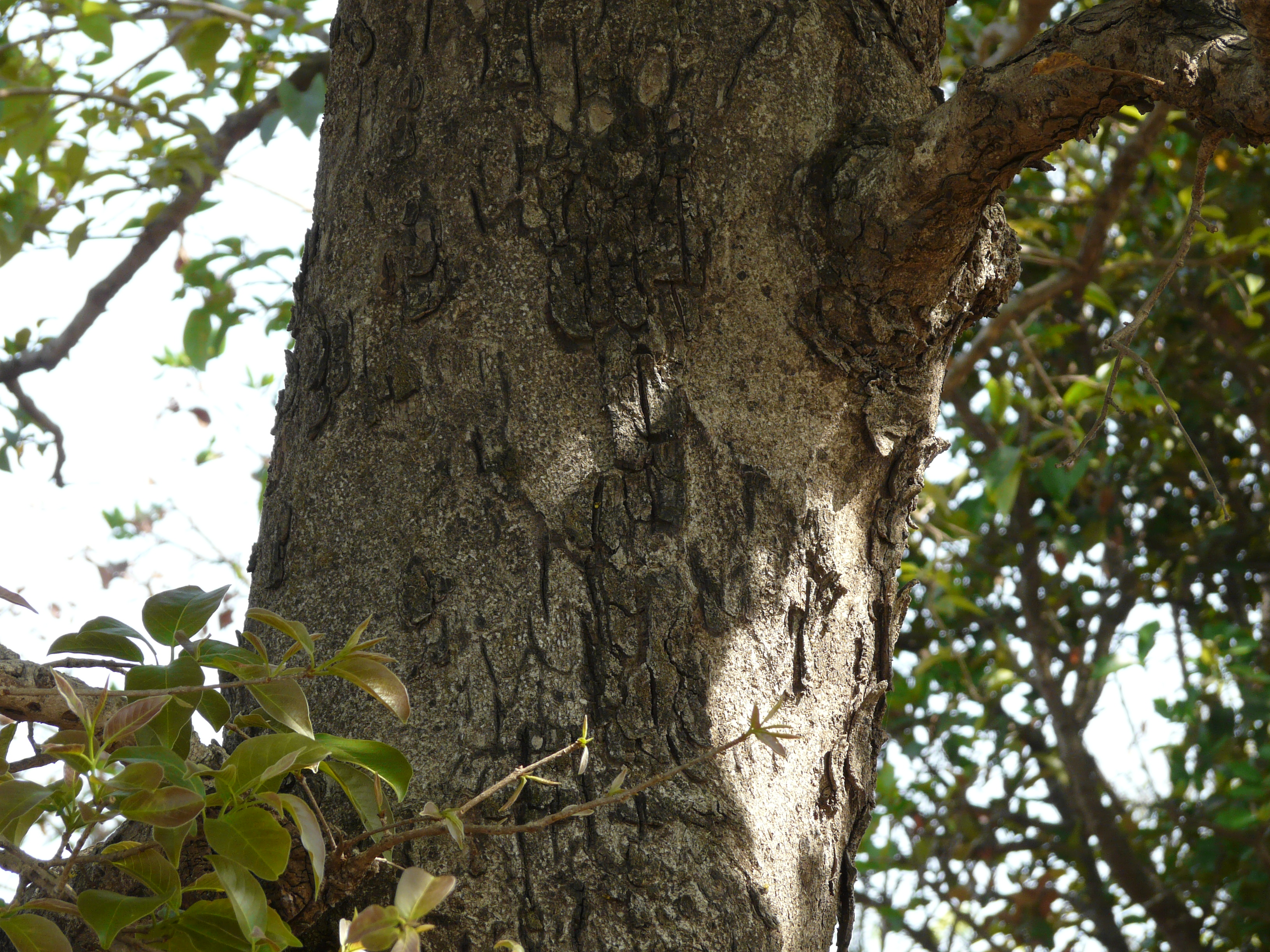
Trunk
