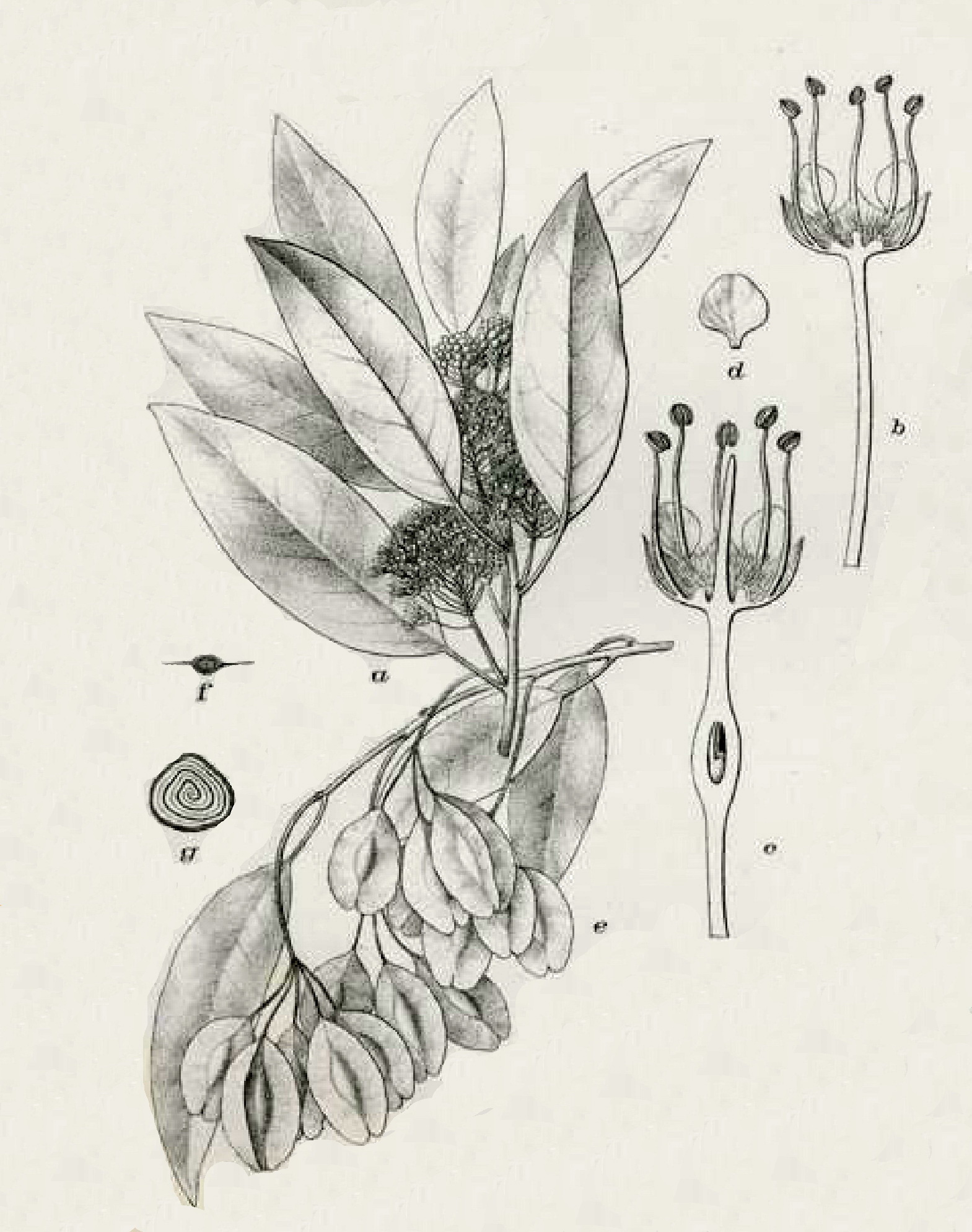
- Pteleopsis myrtifolia

Scientific classification
- Kingdom: Plantae
- Clade: Tracheophytes
- Clade: Angiosperms
- Clade: Eudicots
- Clade: Rosids
- Order: Myrtales
- Family: Combretaceae
- Genus: Pteleopsis; Engl.

= Pteleopsis =

Former genus of plants

Pteleopsis was a genus in the plant family Combretaceae. It is now regarded as a synonym of Terminalia L., another genus of the same family which contains around 290 species.

Species formerly included here:

- Pteleopsis myrtifolia – now Terminalia myrtifolia
- Pteleopsis albidiflora – now Terminalia hylodendron
- Pteleopsis anisoptera – now Terminalia anisoptera
- Pteleopsis apetala – now Terminalia apetala
- Pteleopsis barbosae – now Terminalia barbosae
- Pteleopsis bequaertii – now Terminalia hylodendron
- Pteleopsis diptera – now Terminalia welwitschii
- Pteleopsis habeensis – now Terminalia habeensis
- Pteleopsis hylodendron – now Terminalia hylodendron
- Pteleopsis kerstingii – now Terminalia mollis
- Pteleopsis ledermannii – unplaced
- Pteleopsis obovata – now Terminalia myrtifolia
- Pteleopsis pteleopsoides – now Terminalia pteleopsoides
- Pteleopsis ritschardii – now Terminalia anisoptera
- Pteleopsis stenocarpa – now Terminalia myrtifolia
- Pteleopsis suberosa – now Terminalia engleri
- Pteleopsis tetraptera – now Terminalia tetraptera
- Pteleopsis variifolia – now Terminalia myrtifolia
