= Lophopetalum pallidum =

Conservation status
- Least Concern (IUCN 3.1)

Scientific classification
- Kingdom: Plantae
- Clade: Tracheophytes
- Clade: Angiosperms
- Clade: Eudicots
- Clade: Rosids
- Order: Celastrales
- Family: Celastraceae
- Genus: Lophopetalum
- Species: L. pallidum

Binomial name
- Lophopetalum pallidum M.A.Lawson

Synonyms
- Solenospermum pallidum (M.A.Lawson) Loes; Lophopetalum curtisii King

Species of tree

Lophopetalum pallidum is a tree in the family Celastraceae. The specific epithet pallidum means 'pale', referring to the leaves when dry.

== Description ==
Lophopetalum pallidum grows up to 45 metres (150 ft) tall, with a trunk diameter of up to 80 cm (30 in). The scaly bark is grey. The leathery leaves are obovate to elliptic and measure up to 11 cm (4 in) long. The flowers are in panicles. The fruits measure up to 15 cm (6 in) long.

== Distribution and habitat ==
Lophopetalum pallidum is native to Borneo, Peninsular Malaysia and Sumatra. Its habitat is in lowland forest, to elevations of 200 m (700 ft).

== Uses ==
Lophopetalum multinervium is harvested for its timber, which is used locally. In Malaysia, the species is used for arrow poison.
