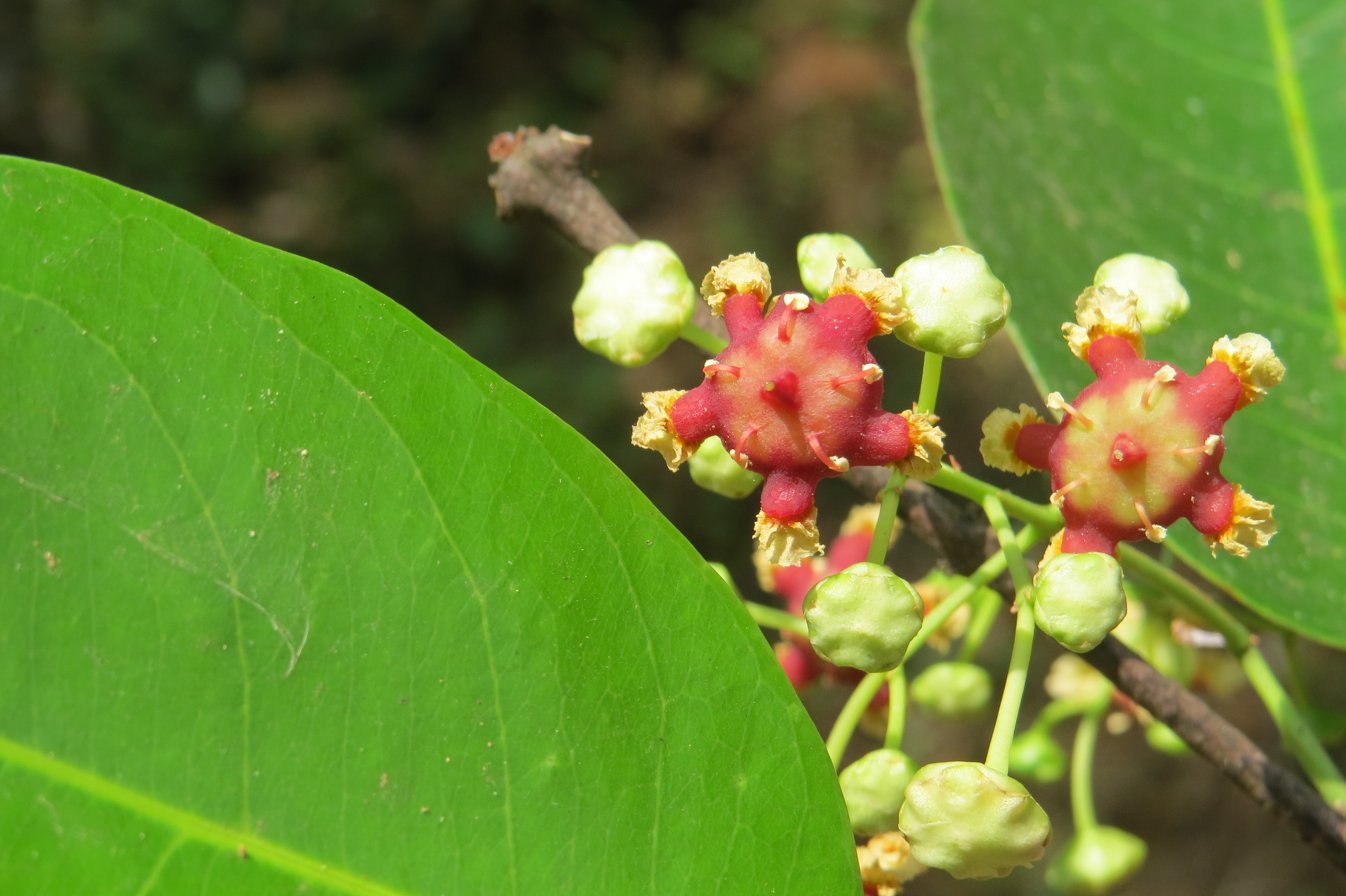
- Lophopetalum wightianum flowers

Scientific classification
- Kingdom: Plantae
- Clade: Tracheophytes
- Clade: Angiosperms
- Clade: Eudicots
- Clade: Rosids
- Order: Celastrales
- Family: Celastraceae
- Genus: Lophopetalum; Wight ex Arn.

Synonyms
- Solenospermum Zoll.

= Lophopetalum =

Genus of flowering plants

Lophopetalum is a genus of plants in the family Celastraceae. It includes 20 species native to tropical Asia, New Guinea, and northern Australia.

== Species ==
Twenty species are accepted:

- Lophopetalum arnhemicum Byrnes
- Lophopetalum beccarianum Pierre
- Lophopetalum duperreanum Pierre
- Lophopetalum floribundum Wight
- Lophopetalum glabrum Ding Hou
- Lophopetalum javanicum (Zoll.) Turcz.
- Lophopetalum ledermannii (Loes.) Ding Hou
- Lophopetalum littorale Kurz
- Lophopetalum micranthum Loes.
- Lophopetalum macranthum (Loes.) Ding Hou
- Lophopetalum micranthum Loes.
- Lophopetalum multinervium Ridl.
- Lophopetalum pachyphyllum King
- Lophopetalum pallidum M.A.Lawson
- Lophopetalum rigidum Ridl.
- Lophopetalum sessilifolium Ridl.
- Lophopetalum subobovatum King
- Lophopetalum tanahgambut Randi, Utteridge & Wijedasa
- Lophopetalum torricellense Loes.
- Lophopetalum wallichii Kurz
- Lophopetalum wightianum Arn.
