= Lophopetalum javanicum =

Conservation status
- Least Concern (IUCN 3.1)

Scientific classification
- Kingdom: Plantae
- Clade: Tracheophytes
- Clade: Angiosperms
- Clade: Eudicots
- Clade: Rosids
- Order: Celastrales
- Family: Celastraceae
- Genus: Lophopetalum
- Species: L. javanicum

Binomial name
- Lophopetalum javanicum (Zoll.) Turcz.

Species of flowering plant

Lophopetalum javanicum is a species of plant in the family Celastraceae. It is native to Bangladesh, Cambodia, Myanmar, Indonesia, Malaysia, Papua New Guinea, the Philippines, Thailand, and Vietnam.

== Synonyms ==
Synonyms:

- Hippocratea maingayi (non Laws.) Vidal
- Lophopetalum celebicus Koord.
- Lophopetalum fimbriatum (non Wight) F. Vill.
- Lophopetalum fuscescens Kurz
- Lophopetalum intermedium Ridl.
- Lophopetalum oblongifolium King
- Lophopetalum oblongum King
- Lophopetalum paucinervium Merr.
- Lophopetalum toxicum Loher
- Solenospermum javanicum Zoll.
- Solenospermum oblongifolius Loes.
- Solenospermum paucinervium Loes.
- Solenospermum toxicum Loes.
