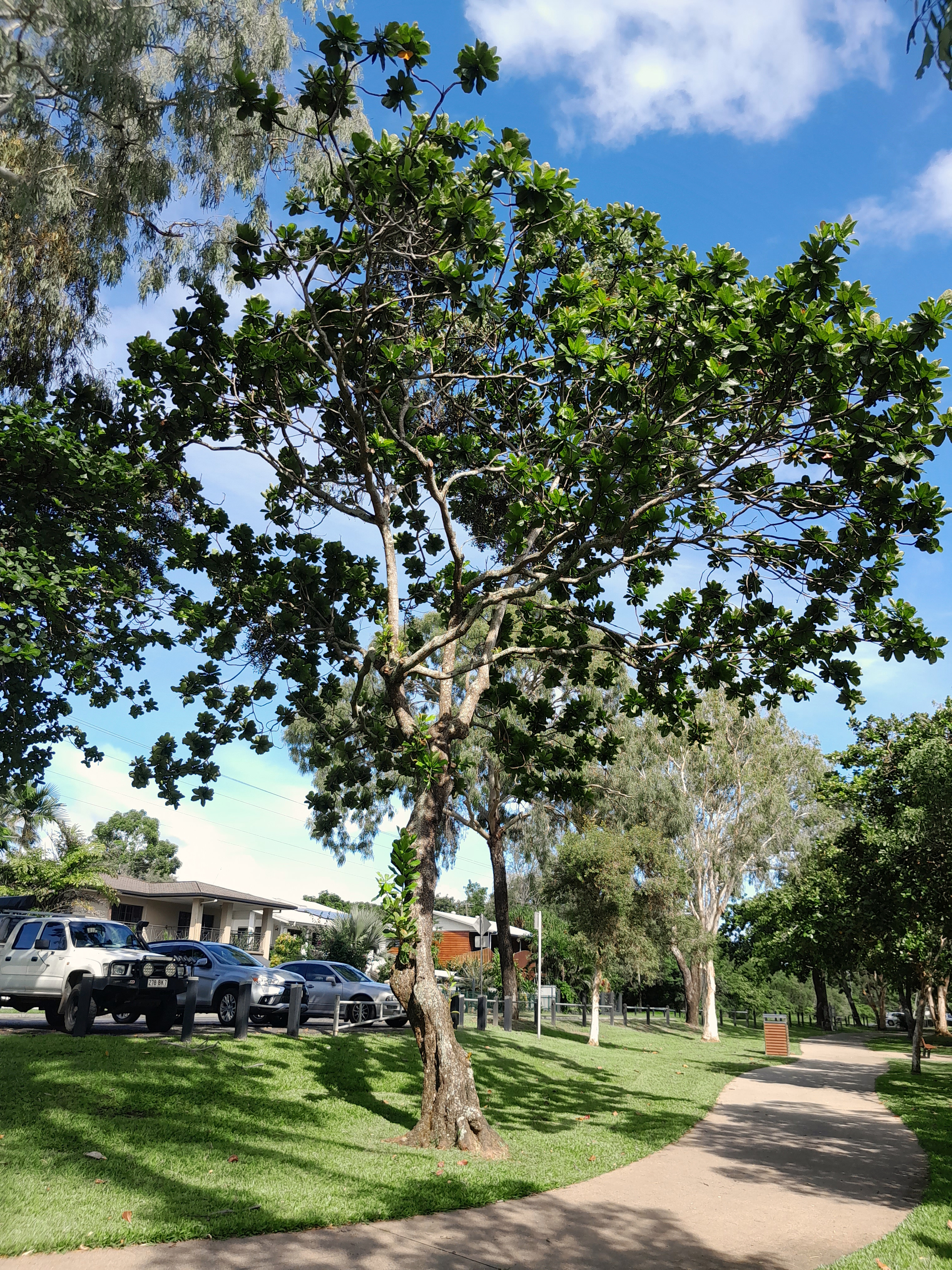
- At Holloways Beach, Queensland

Conservation status
- Least Concern (NCA)

Scientific classification
- Kingdom: Plantae
- Clade: Tracheophytes
- Clade: Angiosperms
- Clade: Eudicots
- Clade: Rosids
- Order: Myrtales
- Family: Combretaceae
- Genus: Terminalia
- Species: T. arenicola

Binomial name
- Terminalia arenicola Byrnes

= Terminalia arenicola =

Brown damson

Species of flowering plant

Terminalia arenicola, commonly known as beach almond or brown damson, is a tree in the family Combretaceae which is endemic to Queensland, Australia.

== Description ==
Terminalia arenicola is a small to medium-sized tree growing to around 10 m (33 ft) high, the trunk is grey and tessellated, branches are often sympodial.

The leaves are obovate, discolorous, spirally arranged and clustered towards the ends of the branches. They may be up to 22 cm (8.7 in) long and 14 cm (5.5 in) wide. Domatia are usually present, as well as glands on the leaf underside near the junction with the petiole.

The inflorescence is an axillary spike or raceme, which carries numerous pentamerous white or cream flowers measuring about 7 mm (0.28 in) diameter. The flowers near the base of the spike are bisexual whilst those near the apex are male.

The fruit is a drupe, at maturity measuring up to 40 mm (1.6 in) long, 25 mm (0.98 in) wide and 18 mm (0.71 in) high, with a short "beak" at the distal end. They are initially glaucous blue/green, becoming dark purple or red at maturity.

This species is very similar to Terminalia catappa, but is generally smaller in most respects.

=== Phenology ===
The brown damson is semi-deciduous and may be bare for a brief period in the spring (Sep-Oct). Flowering occurs from September to May and the fruit may ripen at any time of the year.

== Taxonomy ==
This species was first described in 1977 by Australian botanist Norman Brice Byrnes, and his nominated type was a specimen he collected near Townsville in 1971. His paper describing the new species, A Revision of Combretaceae in Australia, was published in the journal Contributions from the Queensland Herbarium. Prior to the publication of this new taxon, records of this species had been included with T. melanocarpa.

=== Etymology ===
The species epithet arenicola is from the Latin harēna, 'sand', and -cola, 'inhabitant', which refers to the beach habitat that is favoured by this tree.

== Distribution and habitat ==
The brown damson is found in coastal forests in close proximity to beaches, often co-occurring with T. catappa and T. muelleri. The longitudinal range is stated in Flora of Australia as being from 16°S (i.e. in the vicinity of the Bloomfield River) to 20°S (near Bowen), while Byrnes' paper defines the range as being from 22°S (near Airlie Beach) northwards, with no northern limit declared.

== Ecology ==
The fruit are eaten by cassowaries.

== Conservation ==
This species is listed by the Queensland Department of Environment and Science as least concern. As of 1 February 2023, it has not been assessed by the IUCN.

== Cultivation ==
This species, along with T.catappa, has been widely planted in coastal cities of northeast Queensland, on beaches and in streets and parks, as it provides good shade and beautification of these areas.

== Gallery ==
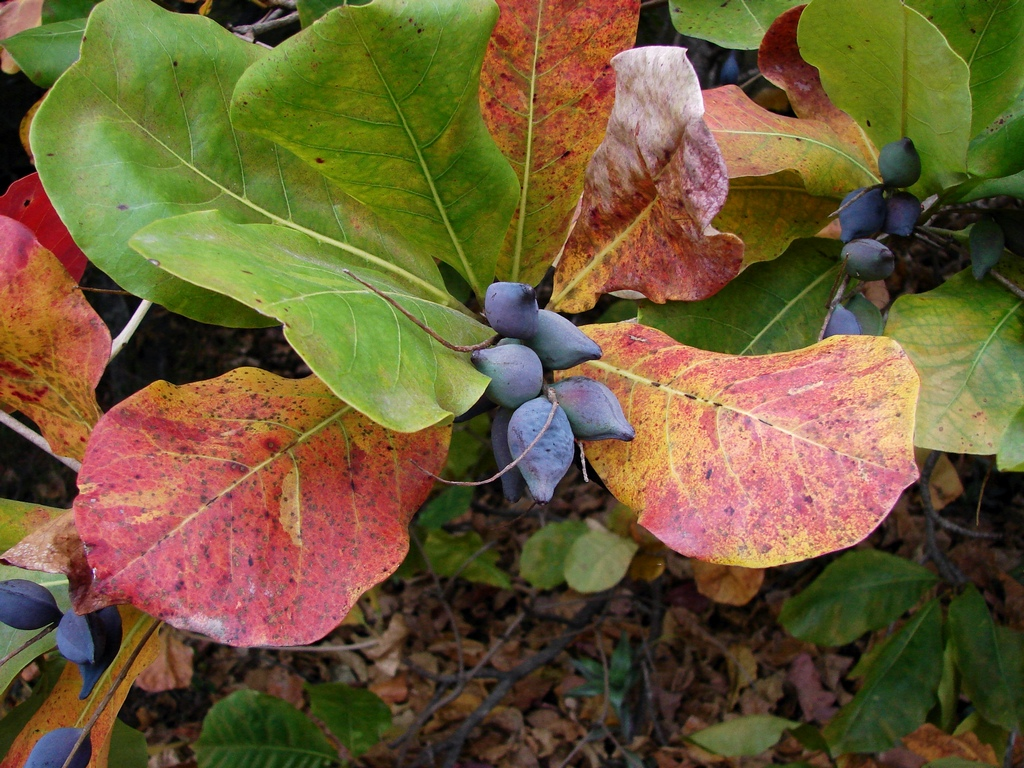
Fruit and foliage

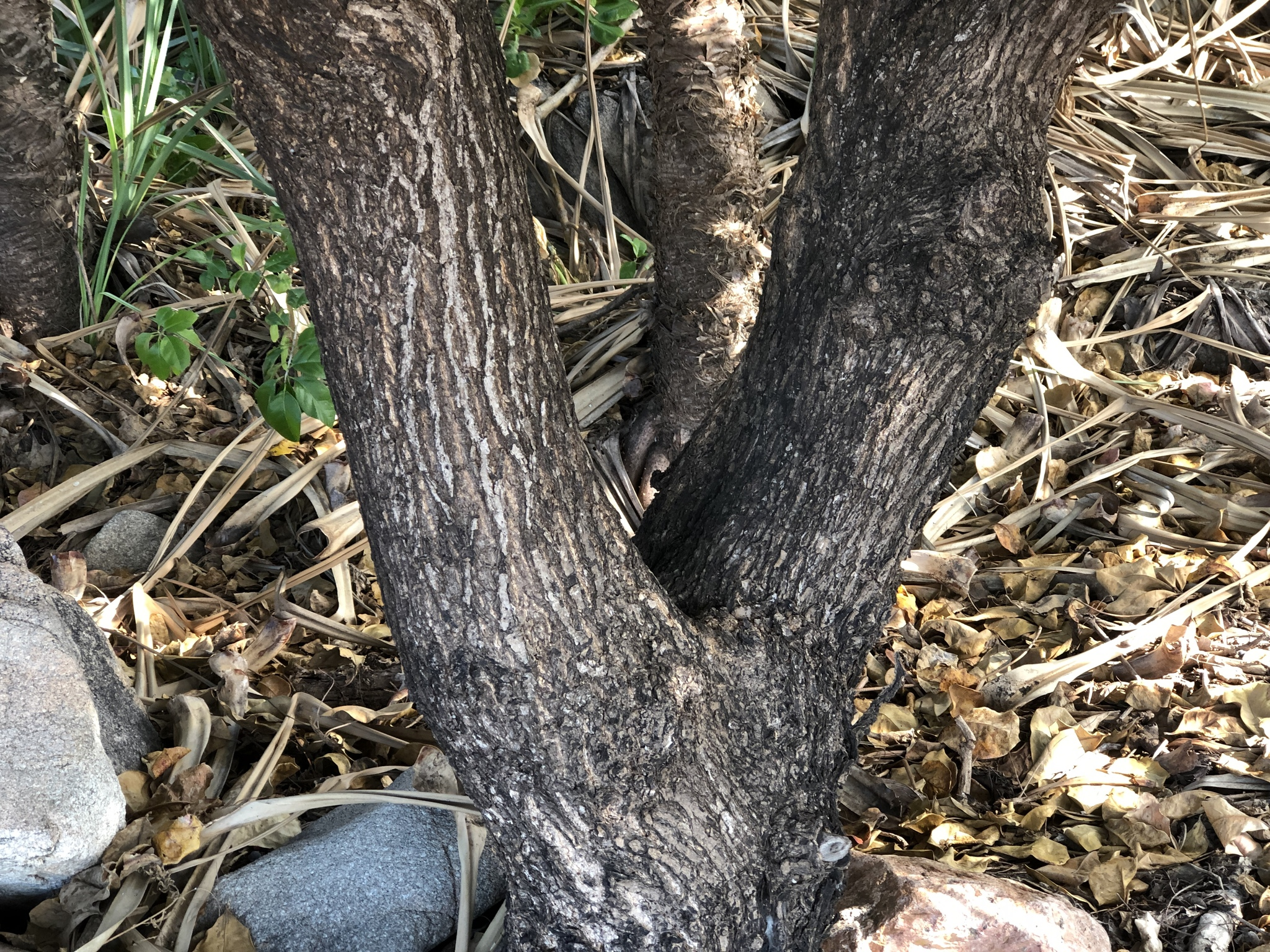
Trunk

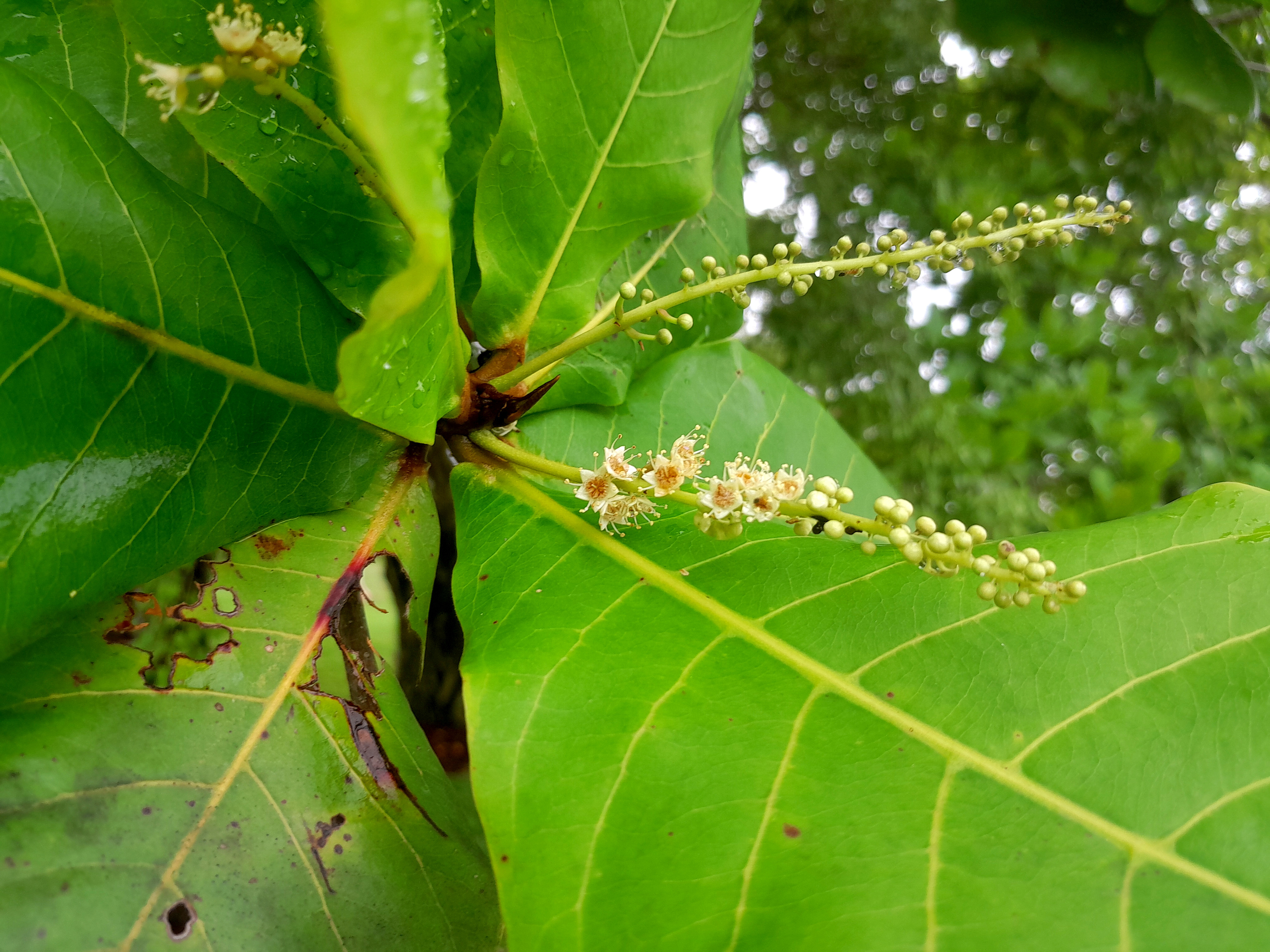
Flowers

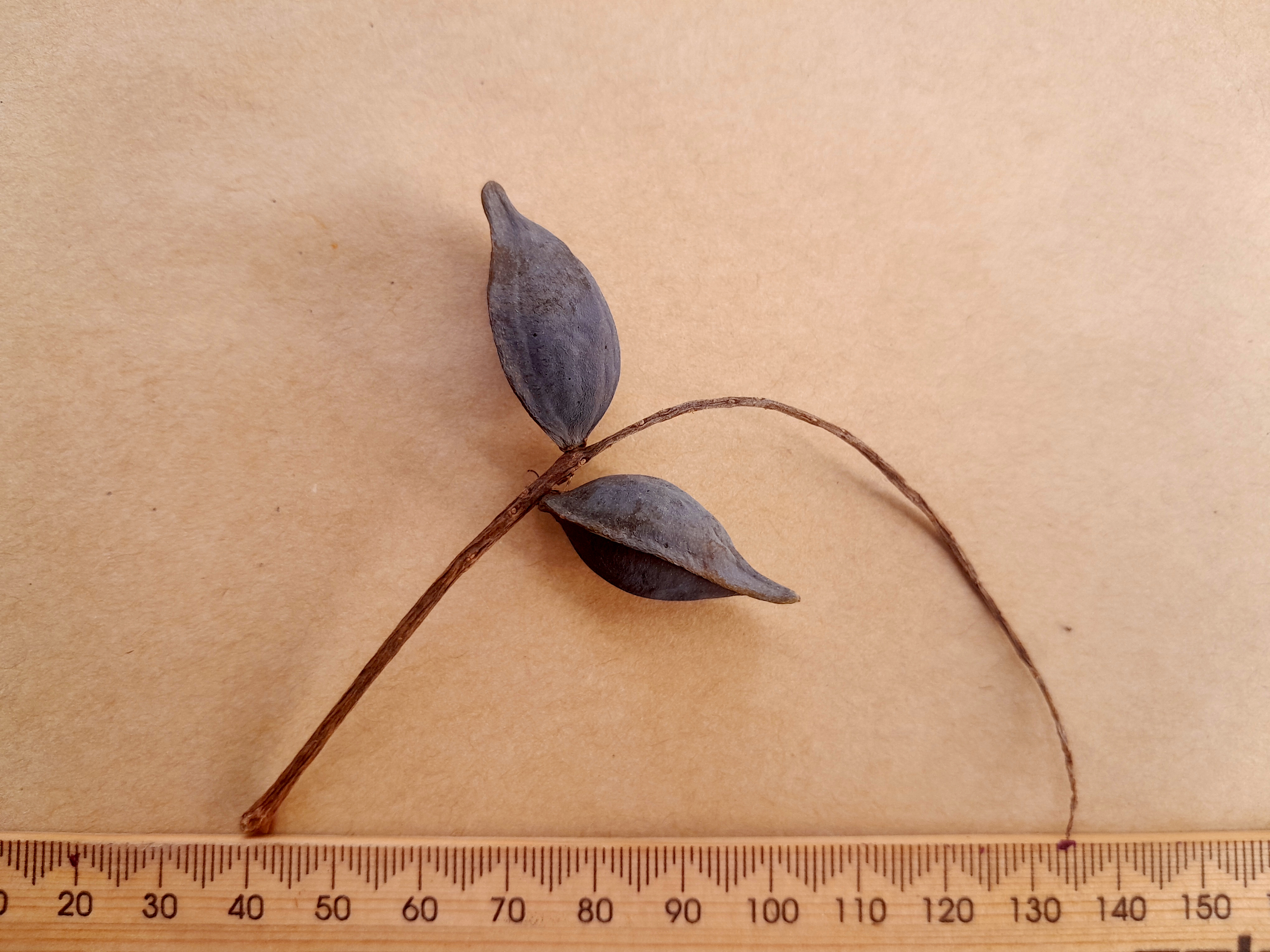
Fruit
