= Lophopetalum glabrum =

Conservation status
- Least Concern (IUCN 3.1)

Scientific classification
- Kingdom: Plantae
- Clade: Tracheophytes
- Clade: Angiosperms
- Clade: Eudicots
- Clade: Rosids
- Order: Celastrales
- Family: Celastraceae
- Genus: Lophopetalum
- Species: L. glabrum

Binomial name
- Lophopetalum glabrum Ding Hou

Species of tree

Lophopetalum glabrum is a tree in the family Celastraceae. The specific epithet glabrum means 'smooth'.

== Description ==
Lophopetalum glabrum grows up to 15 metres (50 ft) tall, with a trunk diameter of up to 15 cm (6 in). The bark is white-grey. The leaves are oblong or elliptic and measure up to 16 cm (6 in) long. The flowers are yellow, in panicles. The fruits are brown to red when fresh and measure up to 12.5 cm (5 in) long.

== Distribution and habitat ==
Lophopetalum glabrum is endemic to Borneo. Its habitat is in mixed dipterocarp forests, to elevations of 400 m (1,300 ft).
