= Kokoona littoralis =

Conservation status
- Least Concern (IUCN 3.1)

Scientific classification
- Kingdom: Plantae
- Clade: Tracheophytes
- Clade: Angiosperms
- Clade: Eudicots
- Clade: Rosids
- Order: Celastrales
- Family: Celastraceae
- Genus: Kokoona
- Species: K. littoralis

Binomial name
- Kokoona littoralis M.A.Lawson

Synonyms
- Lophopetalum littorale (M.A.Lawson) Ridl.; Solenospermum littorale (M.A.Lawson) Loes.

Species of tree

Kokoona littoralis is a tree in the family Celastraceae. The specific epithet littoralis means 'of the seashore'.

== Description ==
Kokoona littoralis grows up to 27 metres (90 ft) tall, with a trunk diameter of up to 30 cm (12 in). Its scaly to smooth bark is brown to grey. The leathery leaves measure up to 20 cm (8 in) long. The flowers are yellow.

== Distribution and habitat ==
Kokoona littoralis is native to Myanmar, Thailand, Peninsular Malaysia, Sumatra and Borneo. Its habitat is in dipterocarp, heath and submontane forests, to elevations of 1,000 m (3,300 ft).

== Varieties ==
The following varieties are recognised:

- Kokoona littoralis var. bakoensis Kochummen – Borneo (Bako National Park in Sarawak)
- Kokoona littoralis var. littoralis – Peninsular Malaysia, Sumatra and Borneo
- Kokoona littoralis var. longifolia Kochummen – Borneo (Sarawak)
