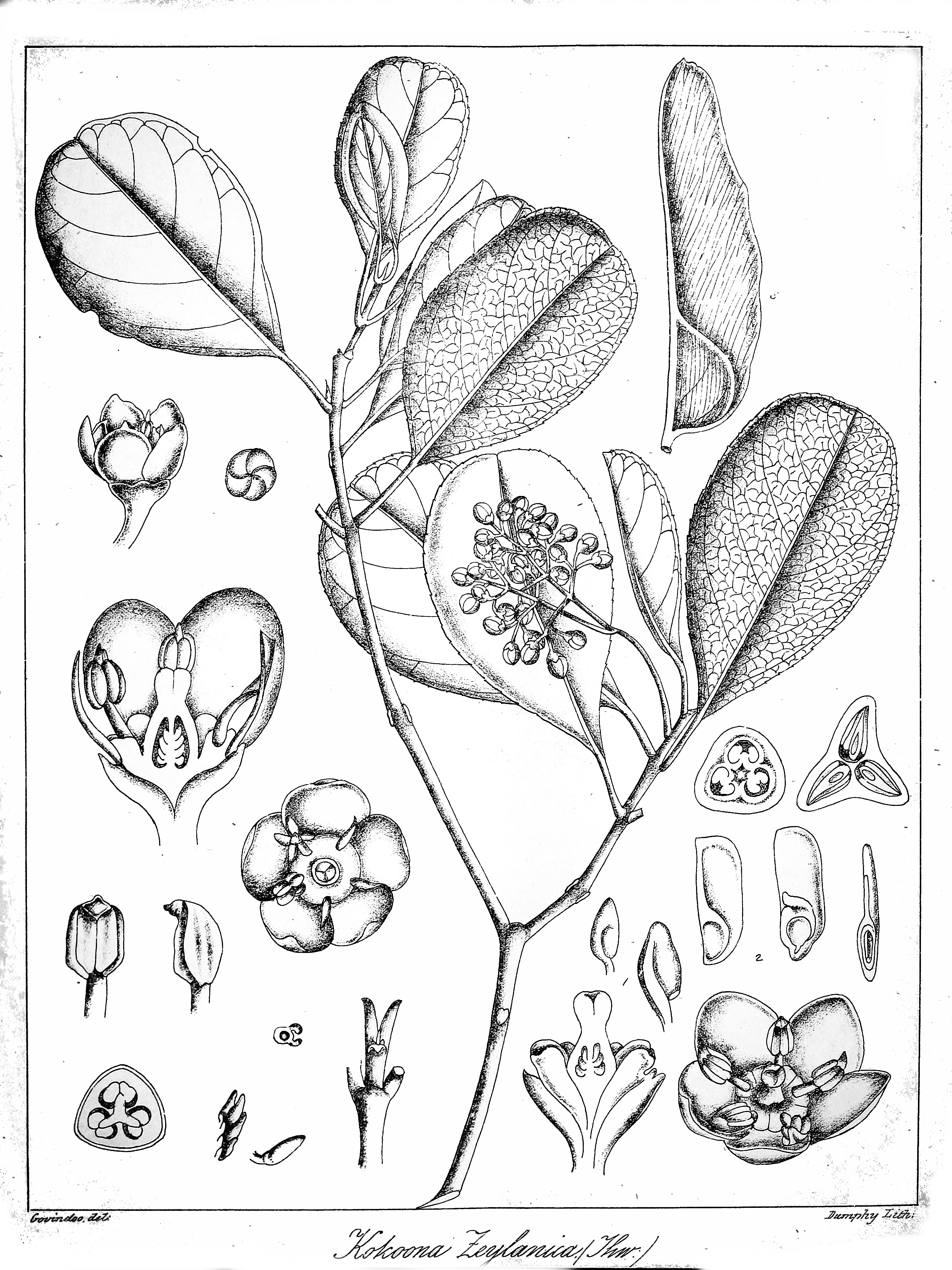

Scientific classification
- Kingdom: Plantae
- Clade: Tracheophytes
- Clade: Angiosperms
- Clade: Eudicots
- Clade: Rosids
- Order: Celastrales
- Family: Celastraceae
- Genus: Kokoona
- Species: K. zeylanica

Binomial name
- Kokoona zeylanica Thwaites

= Kokoona zeylanica =

Species of flowering plant

Kokoona zeylanica, known in Sinhala as කොකුන් (Kokun) is a species of plant in the family Celastraceae. It is not to be confused with the similar sounding word කොකුම් which stands for the Kokum plant. The genus was formerly classified in the family Hippocrateaceae.

It is endemic to Sri Lanka. It is extant at Adam's Peak and at Kanneliya.

The species has been listed by the IUCN as threatened.

== Description ==
The kokun is a large tree with a rough grey bark. It flowers from March to May.

== Uses ==
The kokun is regarded as a medicinal plant traditionally used in a number of conditions. The seed oil from this plant is effective as a leech repellent.

The inner bark has been used by jewellers as a polish.
