= Kokoona coriacea =

Conservation status
- Vulnerable (IUCN 3.1)

Scientific classification
- Kingdom: Plantae
- Clade: Tracheophytes
- Clade: Angiosperms
- Clade: Eudicots
- Clade: Rosids
- Order: Celastrales
- Family: Celastraceae
- Genus: Kokoona
- Species: K. coriacea

Binomial name
- Kokoona coriacea King

Synonyms
- Lophopetalum coriaceum Ridl.

Species of tree

Kokoona coriacea is a species of flowering plant in the family Celastraceae. It is a tree found in Peninsular Malaysia and Borneo. It is threatened by habitat loss.
