= Kokoona sabahana =

Conservation status
- Critically Endangered (IUCN 3.1)

Scientific classification
- Kingdom: Plantae
- Clade: Tracheophytes
- Clade: Angiosperms
- Clade: Eudicots
- Clade: Rosids
- Order: Celastrales
- Family: Celastraceae
- Genus: Kokoona
- Species: K. sabahana

Binomial name
- Kokoona sabahana Kochummen

Species of tree

Kokoona sabahana is a species of plant in the family Celastraceae. It is a tree endemic to Borneo where it is confined to Sabah.

It is a small tree, growing up to 12 metres tall.

It is recorded from Beluran, Nabawan, and Tawau, but the population in Beluran is now gone. It is an uncommon tree in lowland, hill, and swamp forests up to 600 metres elevation. It is threatened by habitat loss.
