= Kokoona ochracea =

Scientific classification
- Kingdom: Plantae
- Clade: Tracheophytes
- Clade: Angiosperms
- Clade: Eudicots
- Clade: Rosids
- Order: Celastrales
- Family: Celastraceae
- Genus: Kokoona
- Species: K. ochracea

Binomial name
- Kokoona ochracea (Elmer) Merr.

Synonyms
- Ardisia ochracea Elmer

Species of tree

Kokoona ochracea is a tree in the family Celastraceae. The specific epithet ochracea means 'yellow-brown', referring to the flowers.

== Description ==
Kokoona ochracea grows up to 30 metres (100 ft) tall, with a trunk diameter of up to 50 cm (20 in). Its twigs are black. The leaves are lanceolate or ovate or elliptic and measure up to 13.5 cm (5 in) long. The flowers, in panicles, are yellow-brown.

== Distribution and habitat ==
Kokoona ochracea is native to Peninsular Malaysia, Borneo and Palawan. Its habitat is in dipterocarp forests at low elevations.

== Uses ==
Kokoona ochracea is harvested for its timber and its bark. The durable timber is used in both outdoor and heavy furniture construction. The bark is used as kindling and provides a readily flammable oil.
