= Lophopetalum beccarianum =

Scientific classification
- Kingdom: Plantae
- Clade: Tracheophytes
- Clade: Angiosperms
- Clade: Eudicots
- Clade: Rosids
- Order: Celastrales
- Family: Celastraceae
- Genus: Lophopetalum
- Species: L. beccarianum

Binomial name
- Lophopetalum beccarianum Pierre

Synonyms
- Euonymus mammillaris Scort. ex King; Lophopetalum havilandii Ridl.; Lophopetalum scortechinii King

Species of tree

Lophopetalum beccarianum is a tree in the family Celastraceae. It is named for the Italian botanist Odoardo Beccari.

== Description ==
Lophopetalum beccarianum grows up to 36 metres (120 ft) tall, with a trunk diameter of up to 60 cm (24 in). The brown-grey bark is smooth. The leaves are oblong or elliptic or ovate and measure up to 30 cm (12 in) long. The flowers are yellow. The fruits measure up to 11 cm (4 in) long.

== Distribution and habitat ==
Lophopetalum beccarianum is native to Sumatra, Peninsular Malaysia and Borneo. Its habitat is in mixed dipterocarp and submontane forests, on hills and ridges, to elevations of 1,800 m (6,000 ft).
