= Kokoona reflexa =

Scientific classification
- Kingdom: Plantae
- Clade: Tracheophytes
- Clade: Angiosperms
- Clade: Eudicots
- Clade: Rosids
- Order: Celastrales
- Family: Celastraceae
- Genus: Kokoona
- Species: K. reflexa

Binomial name
- Kokoona reflexa (M.A.Lawson) Ding Hou

Synonyms
- Lophopetalum reflexum M.A.Lawson; Hippocratea maingayi M.A.Lawson

Species of tree

Kokoona reflexa is a tree in the family Celastraceae. The specific epithet reflexa means 'recurved', referring to the tip of the leaf.

== Description ==
Kokoona reflexa grows up to 30 metres (100 ft) tall, with a trunk diameter of up to 150 cm (60 in). The trunk features buttresses. The brown-grey bark is smooth, becoming scaly. The leaves are lanceolate to elliptic and measure up to 11 cm (4 in) long. The flowers are yellow-green.

== Distribution and habitat ==
Kokoona reflexa is native to Peninsular Malaysia, Borneo and Sumatra. Its habitat is in mixed dipterocarp forests, in hilly areas and along rivers.

== Uses ==
Kokoona reflexa is harvested for its timber and its bark. The durable timber is used in both outdoor and heavy furniture construction. The bark is used as kindling and provides a readily flammable oil.
