= Kokoona ovatolanceolata =

Conservation status
- Least Concern (IUCN 3.1)

Scientific classification
- Kingdom: Plantae
- Clade: Tracheophytes
- Clade: Angiosperms
- Clade: Eudicots
- Clade: Rosids
- Order: Celastrales
- Family: Celastraceae
- Genus: Kokoona
- Species: K. ovatolanceolata

Binomial name
- Kokoona ovatolanceolata Ridl.

Species of tree

Kokoona ovatolanceolata is a tree in the family Celastraceae. The specific epithet ovatolanceolata means 'egg-shaped tapering to the ends', referring to the shape of the leaves.

== Description ==
Kokoona ovatolanceolata grows up to 36 metres (120 ft) tall. Its bark is scaly to smooth. The leaves are elliptic or ovate to ovate-lanceolate and measure up to 11.5 cm (5 in) long. The inflorescences are in panicles and feature yellow flowers. The fruits are oblong and measure up to 17 cm (7 in) long.

== Distribution and habitat ==
Kokoona ovatolanceolata is endemic to Borneo. Its habitat is in swamp forests at low elevations. This habitat is at risk from deforestation, plantations and urbanisation.

== Uses ==
Kokoona ovatolanceolata is harvested for its timber and its bark. The durable timber is used in both outdoor and heavy furniture construction. The bark is used as kindling and provides a readily flammable oil.
