= Lophopetalum pachyphyllum =

Conservation status
- Least Concern (IUCN 3.1)

Scientific classification
- Kingdom: Plantae
- Clade: Tracheophytes
- Clade: Angiosperms
- Clade: Eudicots
- Clade: Rosids
- Order: Celastrales
- Family: Celastraceae
- Genus: Lophopetalum
- Species: L. pachyphyllum

Binomial name
- Lophopetalum pachyphyllum King

Species of tree

Lophopetalum pachyphyllum is a tree in the family Celastraceae. The specific epithet pachyphyllum means 'thick-leaved'.

== Description ==
Lophopetalum pachyphyllum grows up to 25 metres (80 ft) tall, with a trunk diameter of up to 30 cm (12 in). The leathery leaves are elliptic and measure up to 10 cm (4 in) long. The inflorescences are in panicles.

== Distribution and habitat ==
Lophopetalum pachyphyllum is native to Peninsular Malaysia and Sumatra. Its habitat is in lowland dipterocarp forests. The tree is harvested extensively for its timber.
