= Kokoona leucoclada =

Conservation status
- Vulnerable (IUCN 3.1)

Scientific classification
- Kingdom: Plantae
- Clade: Tracheophytes
- Clade: Angiosperms
- Clade: Eudicots
- Clade: Rosids
- Order: Celastrales
- Family: Celastraceae
- Genus: Kokoona
- Species: K. leucoclada

Binomial name
- Kokoona leucoclada Kochummen

Species of tree

Kokoona leucoclada is a species of plant in the family Celastraceae. It is a tree endemic to Borneo where it is confined to Sabah.

It is a medium-sized to large tree which grows up to 35 metres tall, with trunk of up to 20 cm in diameter.

It is known only from Lung Manis, Sandakan, where it grows in lowland rain forest between 70 and 80 metres elevation. It is threatened by habitat loss.
