= Lophopetalum rigidum =

Scientific classification
- Kingdom: Plantae
- Clade: Tracheophytes
- Clade: Angiosperms
- Clade: Eudicots
- Clade: Rosids
- Order: Celastrales
- Family: Celastraceae
- Genus: Lophopetalum
- Species: L. rigidum

Binomial name
- Lophopetalum rigidum Ridl.

Synonyms
- Lophopetalum subsessile Ridl.

Species of plant

Lophopetalum rigidum is a plant in the family Celastraceae. The specific epithet rigidum means 'stiff', referring to the leaves.

== Description ==
Lophopetalum rigidum grows as a shrub or tree, rarely up to 30 metres (100 ft) tall, with a trunk diameter of up to 40 cm (16 in). The smooth bark is brown grey, with lenticels. The leathery leaves are oblong to ovate and measure up to 21 cm (8 in) long. The green-yellow flowers are in panicles. The fruits measure up to 11 cm (4 in) long.

== Distribution and habitat ==
Lophopetalum rigidum is endemic to Borneo, where it is known from Sarawak and Sabah. Its habitat is in swamp forests, including kerangas, and in montane forest to elevations of 2,400 m (8,000 ft).
