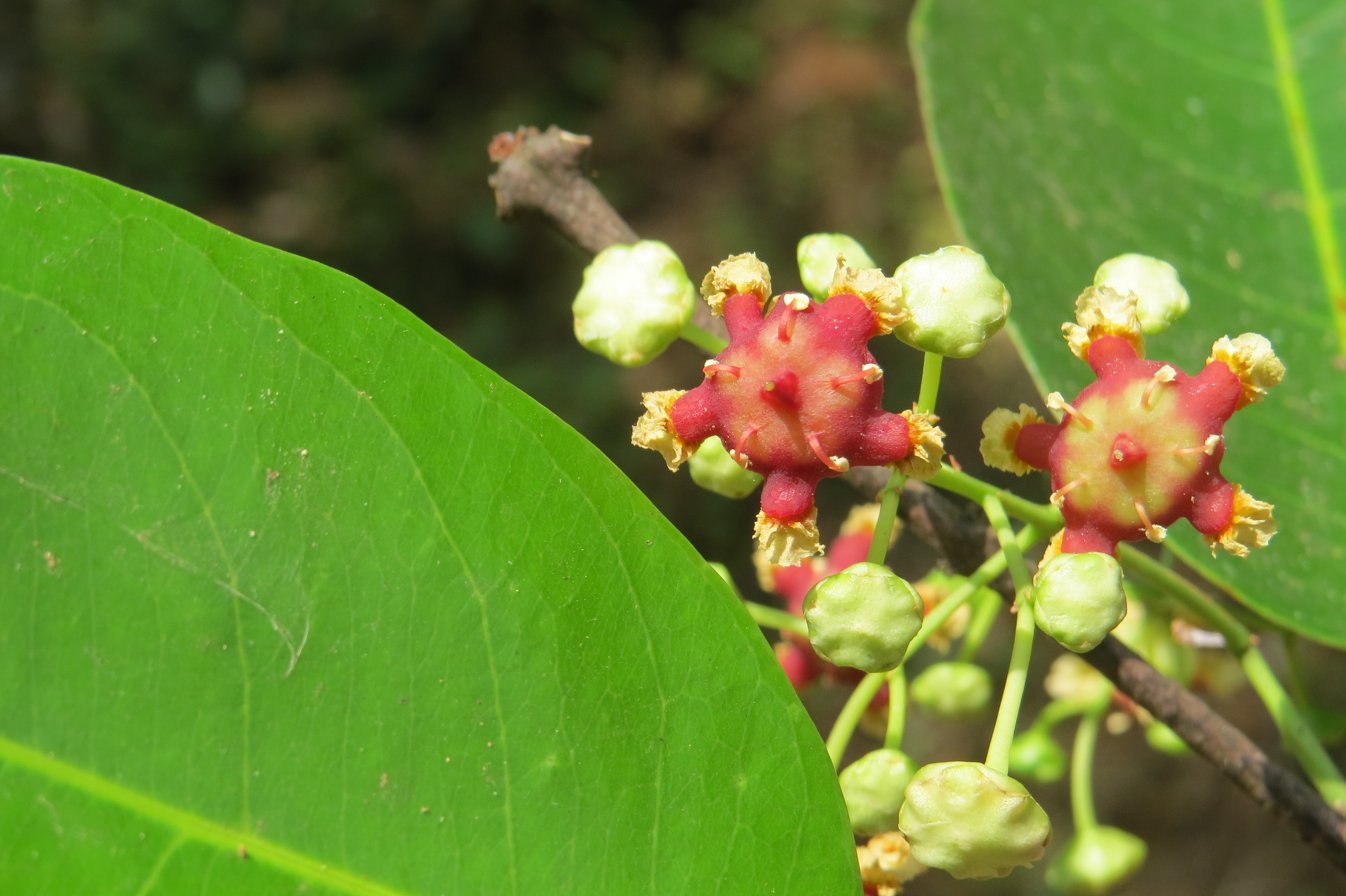
- Lophopetalum wightianum flowers

Conservation status
- Least Concern (IUCN 2.3)

Scientific classification
- Kingdom: Plantae
- Clade: Tracheophytes
- Clade: Angiosperms
- Clade: Eudicots
- Clade: Rosids
- Order: Celastrales
- Family: Celastraceae
- Genus: Lophopetalum
- Species: L. wightianum

Binomial name
- Lophopetalum wightianum Arn.

= Lophopetalum wightianum =

Species of flowering plant

Lophopetalum wightianum is a species of plant in the family Celastraceae. It is found in Brunei, Cambodia, India, Indonesia, Laos, Malaysia, Myanmar, Pakistan, Singapore, Thailand, and Vietnam.
