= Kokoona sessilis =

Conservation status
- Vulnerable (IUCN 2.3)

Scientific classification
- Kingdom: Plantae
- Clade: Tracheophytes
- Clade: Angiosperms
- Clade: Eudicots
- Clade: Rosids
- Order: Celastrales
- Family: Celastraceae
- Genus: Kokoona
- Species: K. sessilis

Binomial name
- Kokoona sessilis Ding Hou

Species of tree

Kokoona sessilis is a species of plant in the family Celastraceae. It is a tree endemic to Peninsular Malaysia. It is threatened by habitat loss.
