= Lophopetalum sessilifolium =

Conservation status
- Vulnerable (IUCN 2.3)

Scientific classification
- Kingdom: Plantae
- Clade: Tracheophytes
- Clade: Angiosperms
- Clade: Eudicots
- Clade: Rosids
- Order: Celastrales
- Family: Celastraceae
- Genus: Lophopetalum
- Species: L. sessilifolium

Binomial name
- Lophopetalum sessilifolium Ridl.

Species of tree

Lophopetalum sessilifolium is a species of plant in the family Celastraceae. It is a tree endemic to Borneo where it is confined to Sarawak.
