= Lophopetalum tanahgambut =

Scientific classification
- Kingdom: Plantae
- Clade: Tracheophytes
- Clade: Angiosperms
- Clade: Eudicots
- Clade: Rosids
- Order: Celastrales
- Family: Celastraceae
- Genus: Lophopetalum
- Species: L. tanahgambut

Binomial name
- Lophopetalum tanahgambut Randi, Utteridge & Wijedasa

Species of plant

Lophopetalum tanahgambut is a recently discovered species of rainforest tree in the family Celastraceae. It is endemic to the peat swamp forests of Sumatra. It was described in 2022 by Agusti Randi and colleagues. The major roots can ascend vertically as much as 1.5 metres (5 ft) then bend down like bent human knees to re-enter the earth. The leaves are in terminal clusters of 3 or 4 in false whorls described as "pseudoverticillate".
