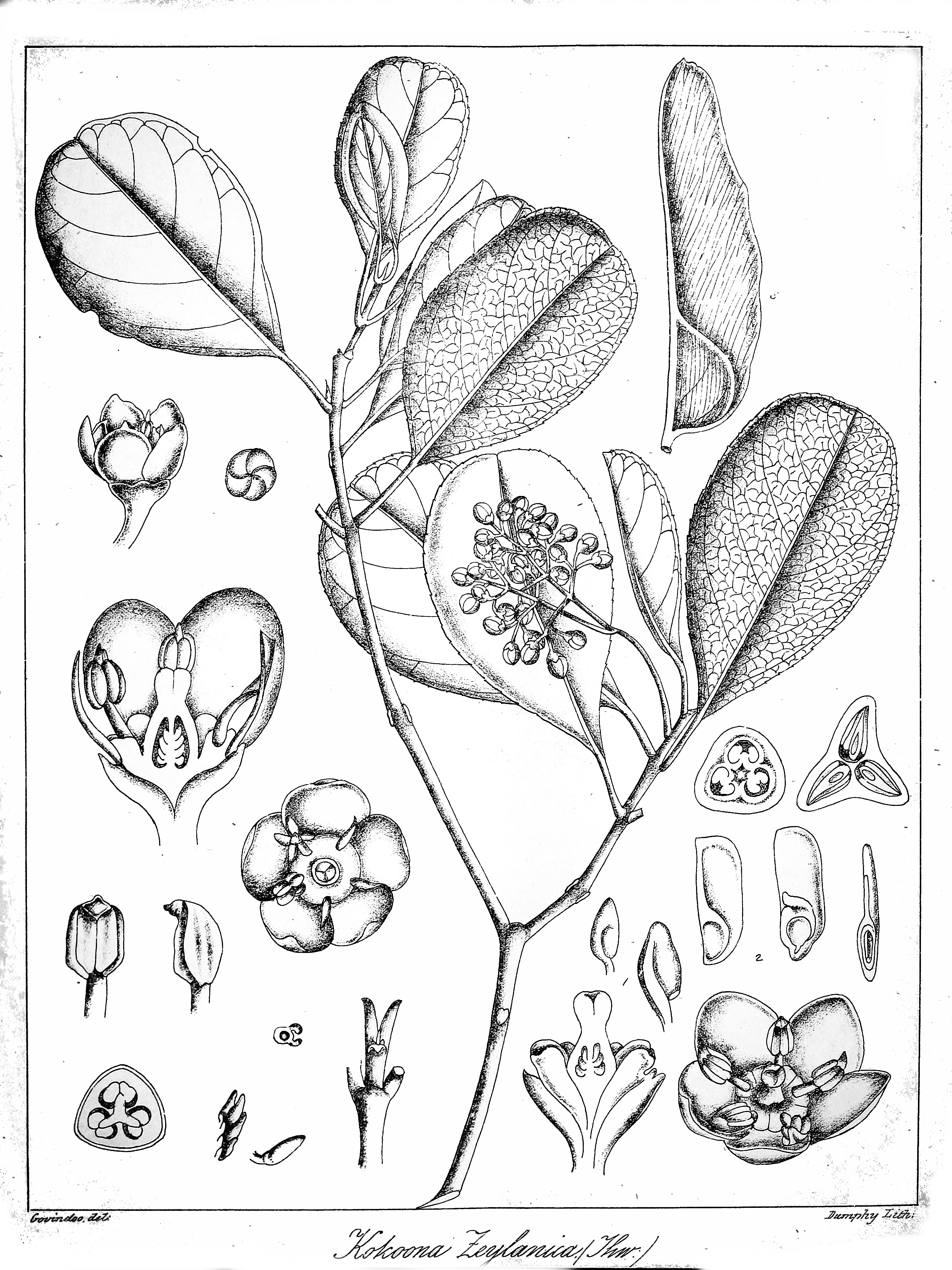
- Kokoona zeylanica

Scientific classification
- Kingdom: Plantae
- Clade: Tracheophytes
- Clade: Angiosperms
- Clade: Eudicots
- Clade: Rosids
- Order: Celastrales
- Family: Celastraceae
- Genus: Kokoona; Thwaites

= Kokoona =

Genus of flowering plants

Kokoona is a genus of flowering plants in the family Celastraceae. It includes ten species native to tropical Asia, ranging from the Indian Subcontinent to Indochina and Malesia.

== Species ==
Ten species are accepted.

- Kokoona coriacea King
- Kokoona filiformis (M.A.Lawson) C.E.C.Fisch.
- Kokoona leucoclada Kochummen
- Kokoona littoralis M.A.Lawson
- Kokoona ochracea (Elmer) Merr.
- Kokoona ovatolanceolata Ridl.
- Kokoona reflexa (M.A.Lawson) Ding Hou
- Kokoona sabahana Kochummen
- Kokoona sessilis Ding Hou
- Kokoona zeylanica Thwaites
