= Lophopetalum multinervium =

Conservation status
- Least Concern (IUCN 3.1)

Scientific classification
- Kingdom: Plantae
- Clade: Tracheophytes
- Clade: Angiosperms
- Clade: Eudicots
- Clade: Rosids
- Order: Celastrales
- Family: Celastraceae
- Genus: Lophopetalum
- Species: L. multinervium

Binomial name
- Lophopetalum multinervium Ridl.

Synonyms
- Solenospermum aquatile Ridl.

Species of tree

Lophopetalum multinervium is a tree in the family Celastraceae. The specific epithet multinervium means 'many-veined', referring to the leaves.

== Description ==
Lophopetalum multinervium grows up to 36 metres (120 ft) tall, with a trunk diameter of up to 60 cm (24 in). The bole features tall buttresses. The smooth bark is yellow, with lenticels. Its leathery leaves are oblong or elliptic or ovate and measure up to 18 cm (7 in) long. The multi-coloured flowers are in panicles. The fruits measure up to 8.5 cm (3 in) long.

== Distribution and habitat ==
Lophopetalum multinervium is native to Borneo, Peninsular Malaysia, Singapore and Sumatra. Its habitat is mainly in swamp forests, but occasionally in submontane forests to elevations of 1,500 m (5,000 ft).

== Conservation ==
Lophopetalum multinervium has been assessed as least concern on the IUCN Red List. However, it is threatened by harvesting for its timber and by conversion of its habitat for plantations and agriculture. In West Kalimantan on Borneo, a program has been established to improve the genetic diversity of the species, which has been impacted by logging. Seedlings collected from wild populations are conserved and bred in protected plots.

== Uses ==
Lophopetalum multinervium is extensively harvested for its timber, which is used locally and traded internationally. In Singapore, the species forms part of the diet of local Raffles' banded langurs.
