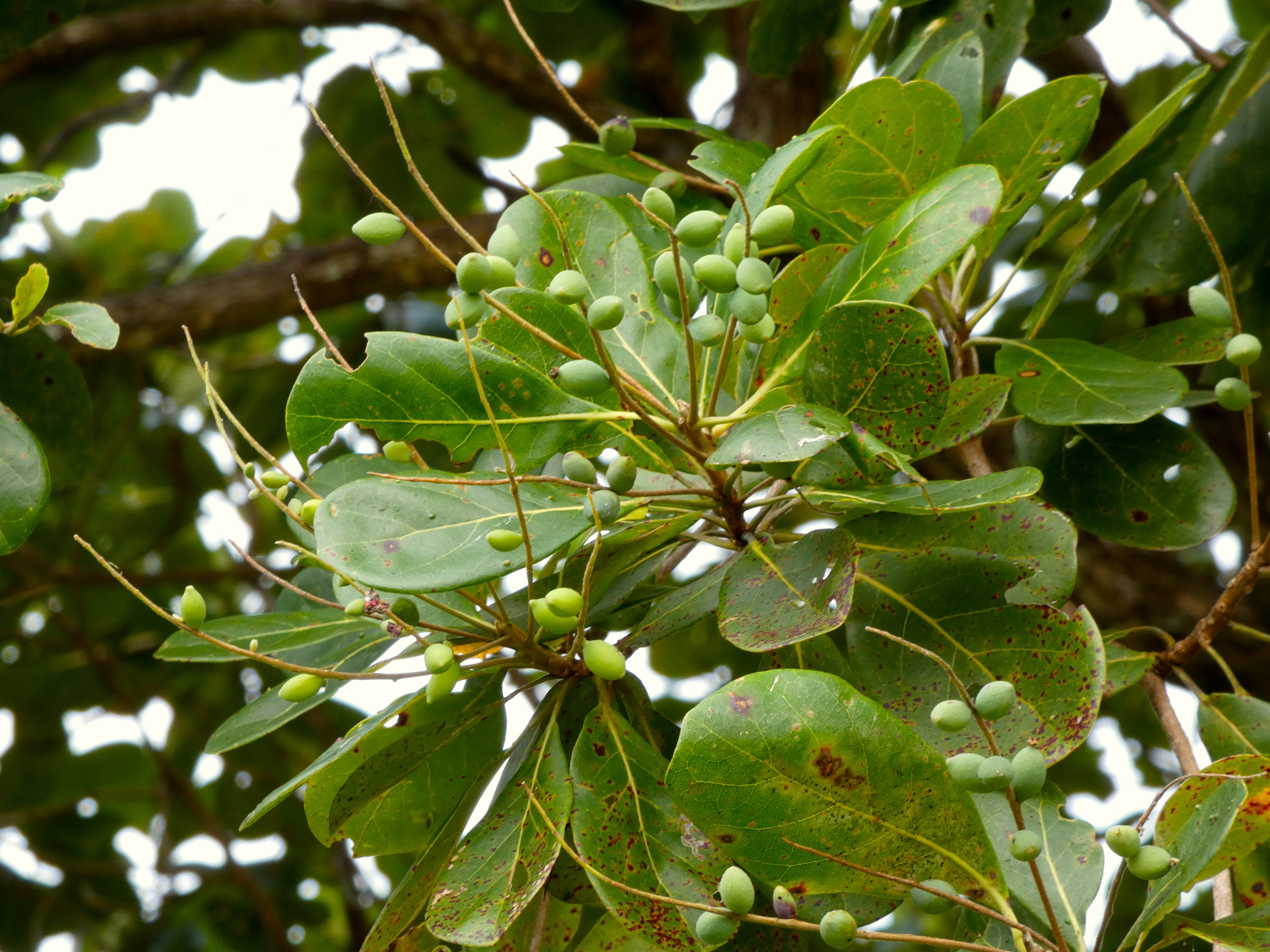
- Leaves and fruit

Conservation status
- Least Concern (NCA)

Scientific classification
- Kingdom: Plantae
- Clade: Tracheophytes
- Clade: Angiosperms
- Clade: Eudicots
- Clade: Rosids
- Order: Myrtales
- Family: Combretaceae
- Genus: Terminalia
- Species: T. muelleri

Binomial name
- Terminalia muelleri Benth.

Synonyms
- Myrobalanus muelleri (Benth.) Kuntze; Terminalia glabra R.Br. ex Benth.; Terminalia microcarpa F.Muell.; Terminalia muelleri var. minor Benth.

= Terminalia muelleri =

Species of flowering plant

Terminalia muelleri, commonly known as Mueller's damson or the Australian almond, is a deciduous species of tree in the family Combretaceae. It is native to the Cobourg Peninsula of the Northern Territory, and to northern and eastern Queensland, Australia, and it has been introduced to India, Florida, and the Central Americas. It is used as a street tree in a number of cities, including Hong Kong, Singapore, and Cairns, Australia.

== Gallery ==
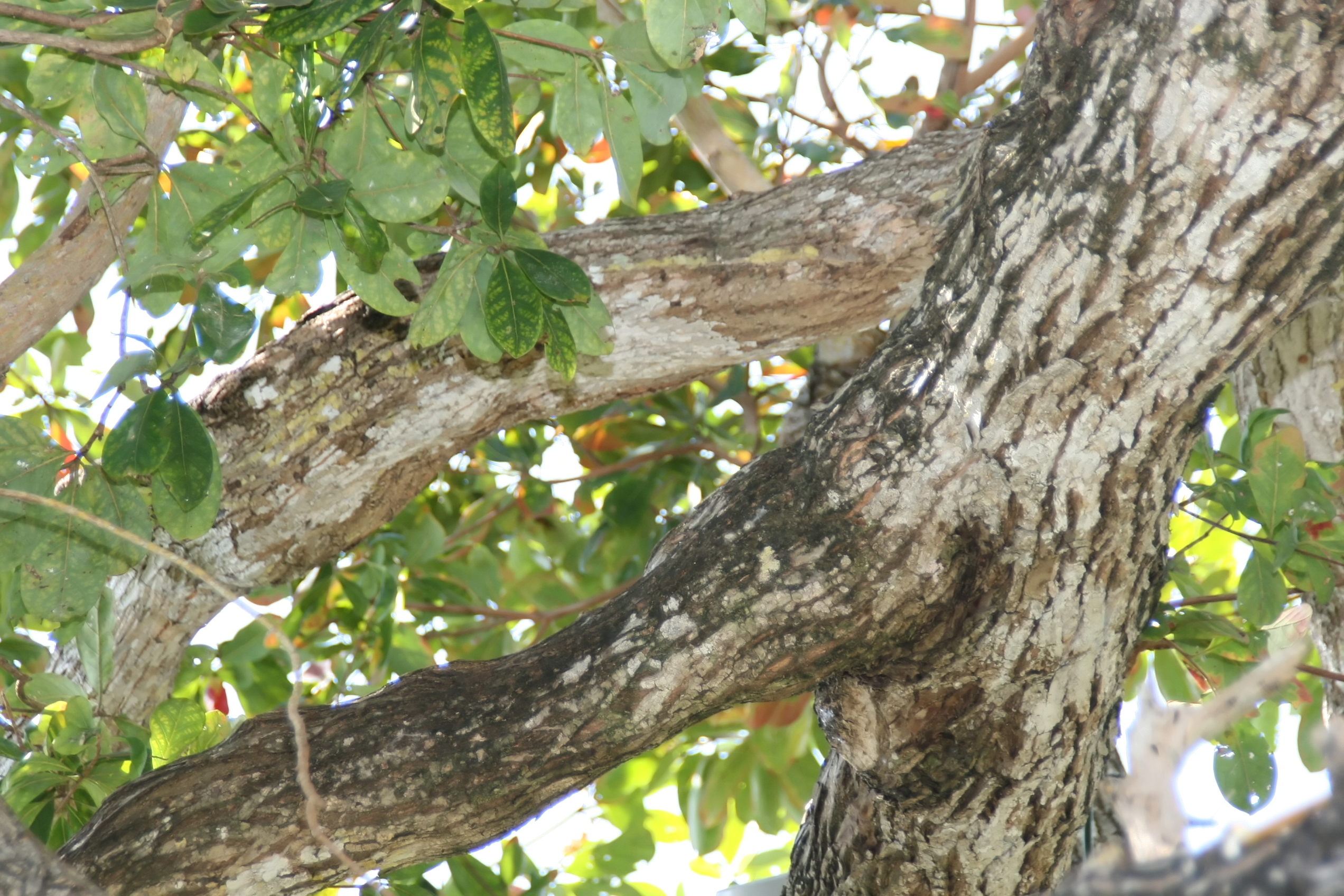
Branch and leaves

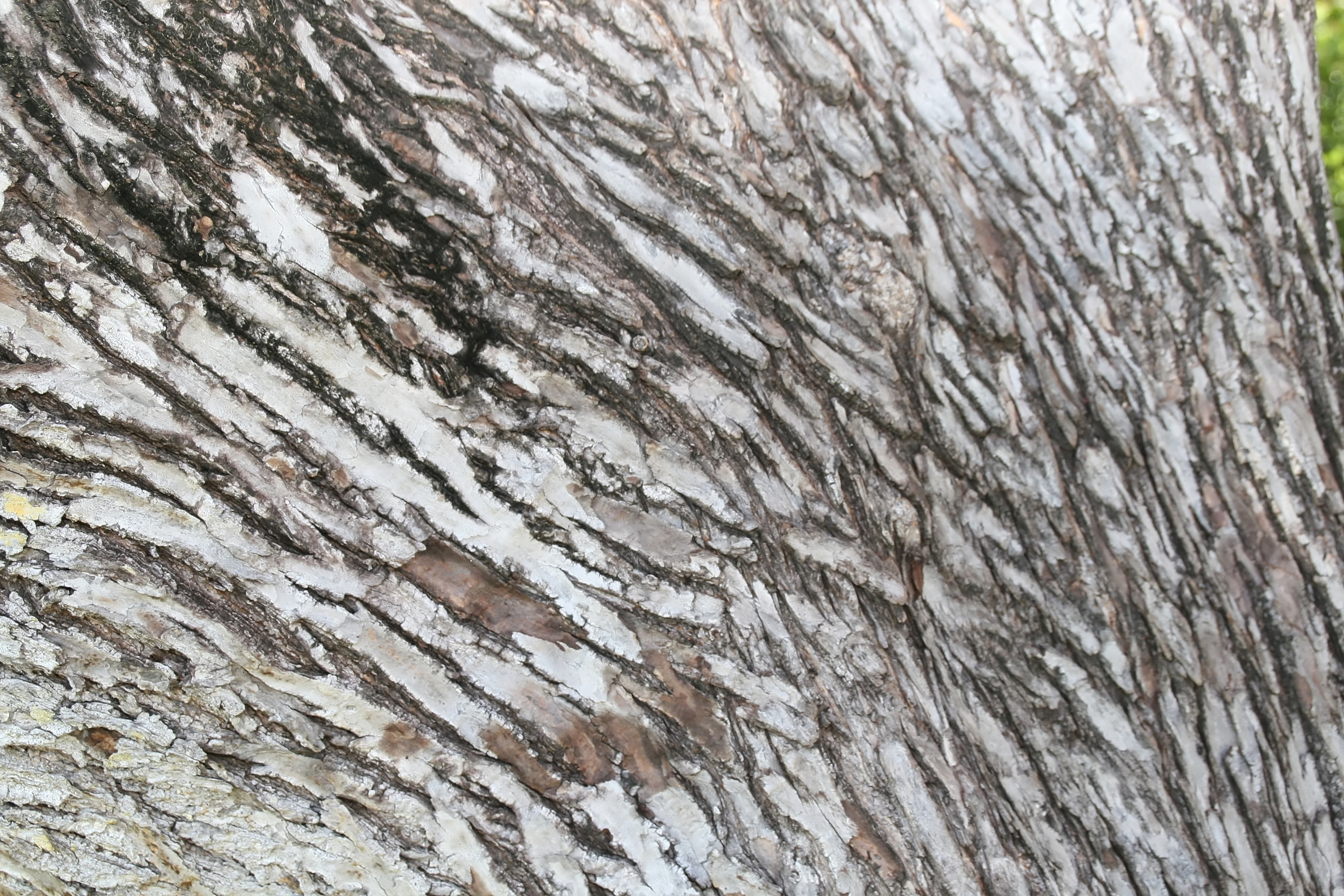
Bark

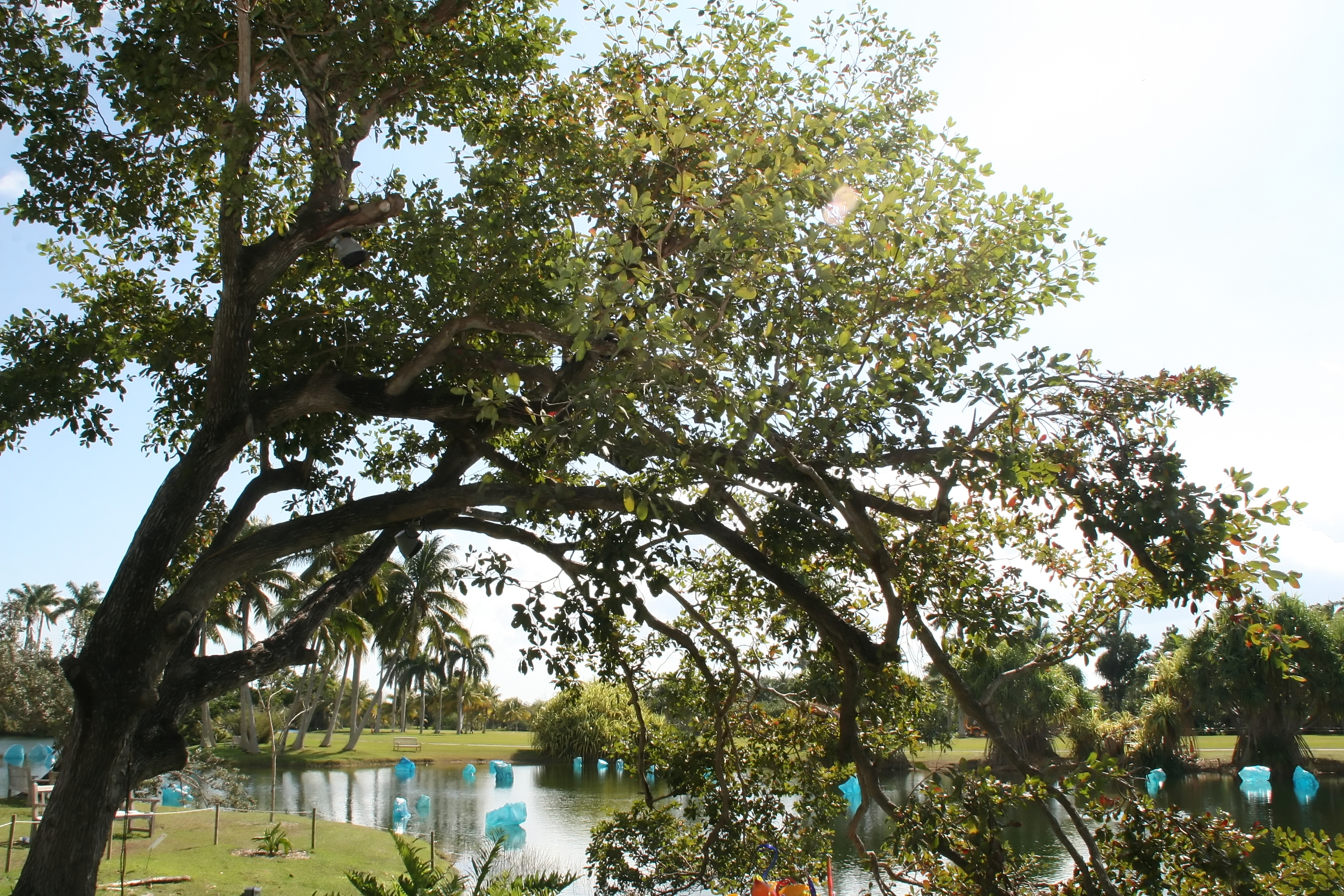
At Fairchild Tropical Botanic Garden
