= Terminalia habeensis =

Conservation status
- Endangered (IUCN 2.3)

Scientific classification
- Kingdom: Plantae
- Clade: Tracheophytes
- Clade: Angiosperms
- Clade: Eudicots
- Clade: Rosids
- Order: Myrtales
- Family: Combretaceae
- Genus: Terminalia
- Species: T. habeensis

Binomial name
- Terminalia habeensis (Aubrév. ex Keay) Gere & Boatwr.

Synonyms
- Pteleopsis habeensis Aubrév. ex Keay

Species of flowering plant

Terminalia habeensis is a species of flowering plant in the Combretaceae family. It is a shrub native to Burkina Faso and Mali.
