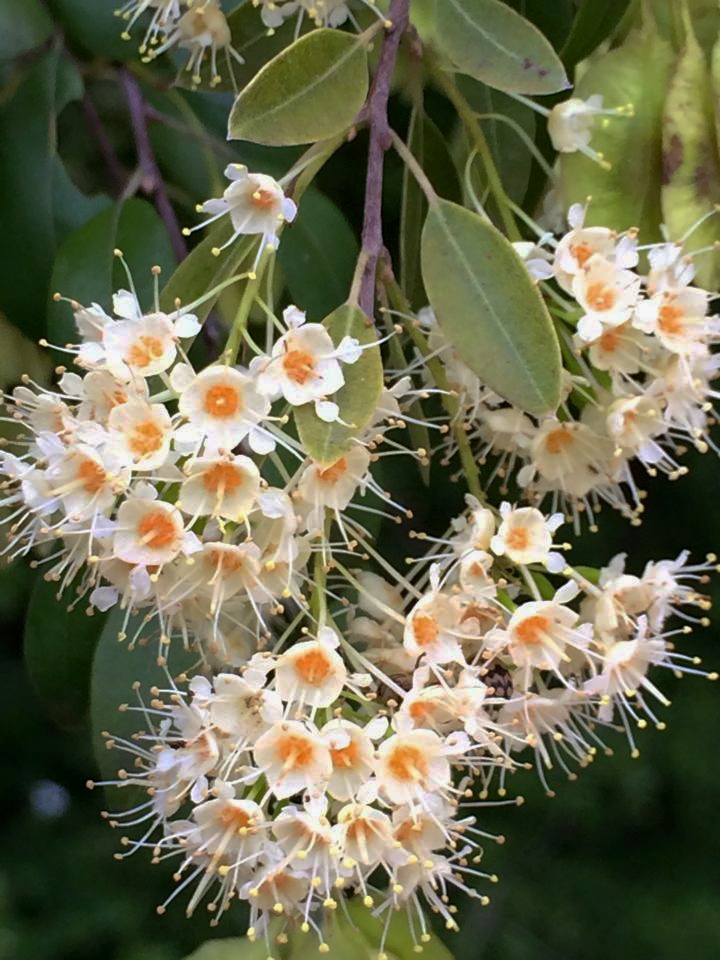

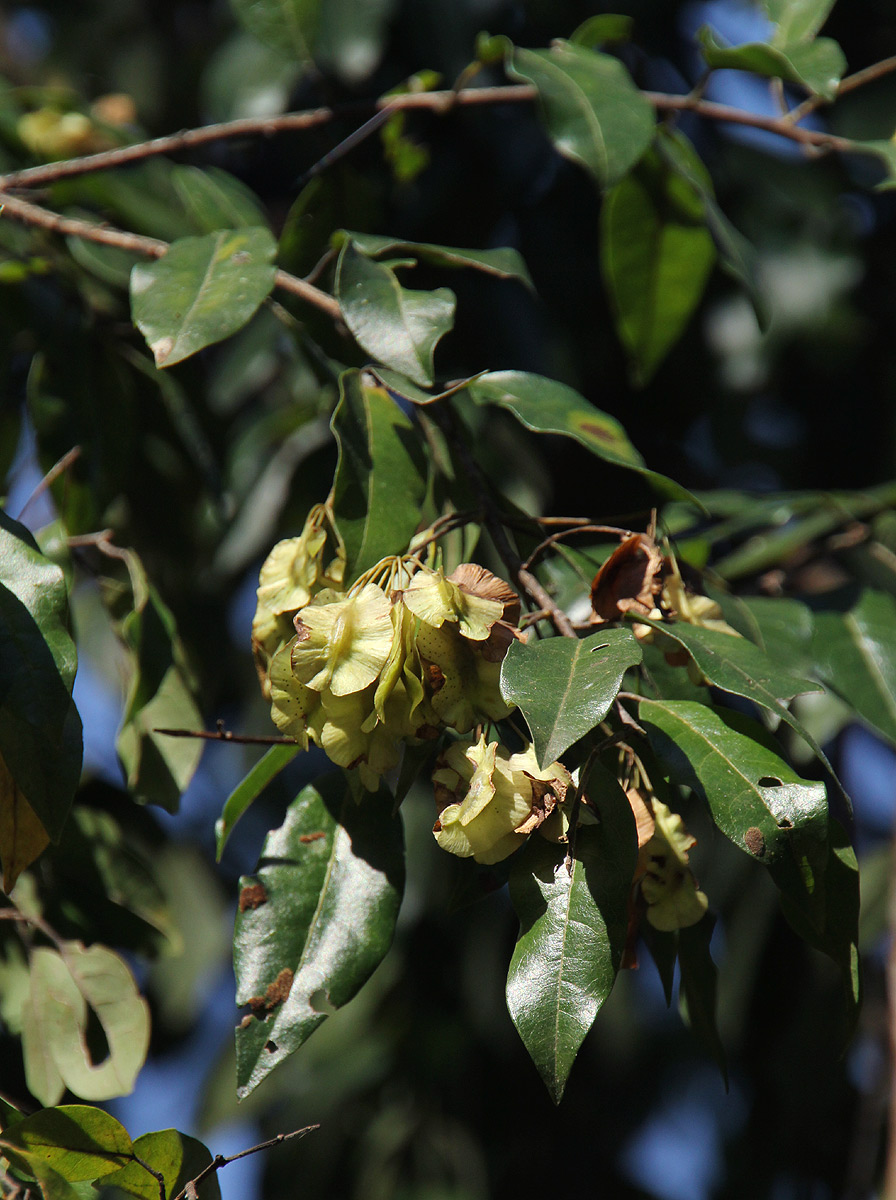

Conservation status
- Least Concern (SANBI Red List)

Scientific classification
- Kingdom: Plantae
- Clade: Tracheophytes
- Clade: Angiosperms
- Clade: Eudicots
- Clade: Rosids
- Order: Myrtales
- Family: Combretaceae
- Genus: Terminalia
- Species: T. myrtifolia

Binomial name
- Terminalia myrtifolia (M.A.Lawson) Gere & Boatwr.

Synonyms
- Combretum myrtifolium M.A.Lawson; Pteleopsis myrtifolia (M.A.Lawson) Engl. & Diels; Pteleopsis obovata Hutch.; Pteleopsis stenocarpa Engl. & Diels; Pteleopsis variifolia Engl.

= Terminalia myrtifolia =

Species of flowering plant

Terminalia myrtifolia is an African species of plant in the family Combretaceae. Its flowers are strongly scented and perceived by humans to be either 'honey-like' or 'cloying' or even 'stinky'. The timber is red, hard and durable, and used for furniture and construction.

This is a dense, often multi-stemmed semi-deciduous small tree with a drooping habit up to 20 m tall. Bark is greyish-pink, and smooth, net-like in appearance. Leaves are opposite and simple, 10–95 mm x 6–35 mm, narrowly elliptical with acute apex and base; surface glabrous and occasionally glossy above; margins entire and may be wavy. Petiole is often hairy. Inflorescence axillary and some 45 mm long. Ellipsoid fruit with 2 or 3 wings, 10–25 mm x 5–17 mm.

It is found on rocky hillsides and stony outcrops, in evergreen and riverine forest, from sea level up to 1600 m elevation, mainly along the east coast of Southern Africa. It occurs in savanna such as Baikiaea, mopane, and miombo (Brachystegia) woodlands, and ranges from northern Zululand, the Nwambiya Sandveld of the Kruger National Park, Mozambique, westwards to Botswana, Caprivi Strip, Zambia, Zimbabwe, Angola and northwards to Malawi, Tanzania, and Kenya where it is very rare.

== Ethnic medicine ==
Leaf sap is sometimes blended with that of Diospyros zombensis (B.L.Burtt) F.White, and taken to treat dysentery. It is also taken to ward off threatening abortion. A decoction of roots and chicken is taken to treat sterility, for venereal diseases, dysentery and excessive menstruation. A poultice is applied to sores. Leaves are cooked and eaten, and the fruits are considered edible. Livestock avoid the species. Leaves are eaten by the caterpillar Imbrasia lucida, which are picked and fried with onions in oil, or cooked and dried for later consumption.

== Phytochemicals ==
Leaf extracts contain the pentacyclic triterpenoid taraxerol and show antibacterial activity against Escherichia coli and Enterococcus faecalis. Leaf extracts also inhibited cancer cell lines MCF-12A, H157, WHC03 and HeLa. A methanolic root extract showed strong inhibitory effects on the T24 bladder cancer cells, but less so against the HeLa cervical cancer and MCF7 breast cancer. Root extracts showed antifungal activity against Candida glabrata and Candida krusei, and some activity against Cryptococcus neoformans.

Species of Combretum and Terminalia are generally a rich source of drugs for treating tumors and fungal infections.
