= Marmaduke Alexander Lawson =

British botanist (1840–1896)

Marmaduke Alexander Lawson (20 January 1840, Seaton Carew, County Durham – 14 February 1896, Madras) was a British botanist.

Lawson matriculated at Trinity College, Cambridge in 1858 and graduated there B.A. in 1862 and M.A. in 1868. He was Sherardian Professor of Botany and Rural Economy at Oxford from 1868 to 1883, when he resigned in favour of a post in Madras. From 1883 until his death in 1896, he was Director of the Tamil Nadu Botanical Department at Ootacamund and at Madras (formally, Director of Government Cinchona Plantations, Parks, and Gardens, Nilgiris). His duties included naming and arranging the Madras herbarium and overseeing the production and sale of Cinchona bark from the Government Cinchona plantations in the Nilgiri Hills, Nilgiris District.

Lawson was elected F.L.S. in 1869. He was President of the Section of Zoology and Botany of the British Association in 1882.

The standard author abbreviation M.A.Lawson is used to indicate this person as the author when citing a botanical name.

== Eponyms ==
- Pteleopsis myrtifolia (M.A.Lawson) Engl. & Diels

== Selected publications ==
- Lawson, M. A. (1869). "On the flora of Skye". Journal of Botany. 7: 108–114.
- — (1871). D. Oliver (ed.). "Combretaceae". Flora of Tropical Africa. 2: 413–436.
- — (1875). "Ampelideae". Flora of British India. 1: 644–668.
- — (1896). "Notes of a Botanical Tour in Travancore, etc". Records of the Botanical Survey of India. 1 (4): 58–60.
